= Frederick II, Holy Roman Emperor =

Holy Roman Emperor from 1220 to 1250

Frederick II
- Imperator Romanorum
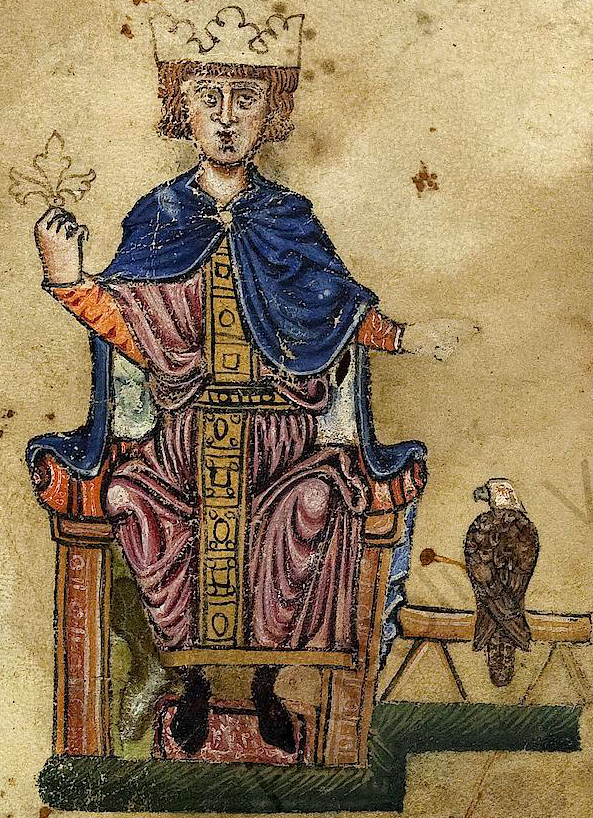
- Contemporary portrait of Frederick II from the "Manfred manuscript" (Biblioteca Vaticana, Pal. lat 1071) of De arte venandi cum avibus

Holy Roman Emperor
- Reign: 23 November 1220 – 13 December 1250
- Coronation: 23 November 1220 (Rome, Papal Coronation)
- Predecessor: Otto IV in 1215 (Note: Frederick II was crowned King in Germany in 1212. He deposed his rival Otto IV in 1215 and received the Imperial coronation in 1220.)
- Successor: Henry VII in 1312 (Note: During the Great Interregnum after Frederick II's death, no claimant was able to secure the Imperial crown until 1312.)

King of Sicily
- Reign: 1198–1250
- Coronation: 3 September 1198, Palermo
- Predecessor: Constance I
- Successor: Conrad I
- Co-rulers: Constance I (1198); Henry II (1212–1217)

King of the Romans King of Germany, Burgundy, and Italy
- Reign: 1196/5 December 1212 – 13 December 1250
- Coronation: 9 December 1212 (Mainz, German coronation)
- Predecessor: Otto IV
- Successor: Conrad IV
- Co-rulers: Henry (VII) (1220–1235); Conrad IV (1237–1250)

King of Jerusalem
- Reign: 1225–1243 (also regent for Conrad II from 1228)
- Coronation: 18 March 1229, Jerusalem
- Predecessor: John and Isabella II
- Successor: Conrad II
- Co-rulers: Isabella II (1225–1228); Conrad II (1228–1243)
- Born: 26 December 1194; Jesi, March of Ancona, Italy
- Died: 13 December 1250 (aged 55); Castel Fiorentino, Kingdom of Sicily
- Burial: Cathedral of Palermo
- Spouses: Constance of Aragon (m. 1209; died 1222) Isabella II of Jerusalem (m. 1225; died 1228) Isabella of England (m. 1235; died 1241) (possibly) Bianca Lancia (m. 1246; died 1248)
- Issue more...: Henry (VII), King of Germany; Conrad IV, King of Germany; Margaret, Landgravine of Thuringia; Illegitimate: Frederick of Pettorano; Enzo, King of Sardinia; Frederick, Imperial Vicar of Tuscany; Anna, Empress of Nicaea (Note: Frederick may have regarded Anna of Nicaea and Manfred of Sicily as his legitimate children.); Manfred, King of Sicily
Names
- Frederick Roger
- House: Hohenstaufen
- Father: Henry VI, Holy Roman Emperor
- Mother: Constance I of Sicily

Frederick II (Italian: Federico, Sicilian: Fidiricu, German: Friedrich, Latin: Fridericus; 26 December 1194 – 13 December 1250) was King of Sicily from 1198, King of Germany from 1212, King of Italy and Holy Roman Emperor from 1220, and King of Jerusalem from 1225 to 1228. He was the son of Emperor Henry VI, of the Hohenstaufen dynasty (the second son of Emperor Frederick Barbarossa), and Queen Constance I of Sicily, of the Hauteville dynasty.

Frederick is considered to be one of the most brilliant and powerful figures of the Middle Ages and ruled a vast area, extending from Sicily in the south, through much of Italy, to Germany in the north. Viewing himself as a direct successor to the Roman emperors of antiquity, he was Emperor of the Romans from his papal coronation in 1220 until his death and also a claimant to the title of King of the Romans from 1212 and unopposed holder of that dignity from 1215. As such, he was King of Germany, Italy, and Burgundy. At the age of three, he was crowned King of Sicily as co-ruler with his mother, Constance, Queen of Sicily, the daughter of Roger II of Sicily. His other royal title was King of Jerusalem by virtue of marriage and his connection with the Sixth Crusade. Frequently at war with the papacy, which was hemmed in between Frederick's lands in northern Italy and his Kingdom of Sicily (the Regno) to the south, he was "excommunicated four times between 1227 and his own death in 1250" and was often vilified in pro-papal chronicles of the time and after. Pope Innocent IV went so far as to declare him preambulus Antichristi (forerunner of the Antichrist).

For his many-sided activities, dynamic personality and talents, Frederick II has been called the greatest of all the German emperors, perhaps even of all medieval rulers. In the Kingdom of Sicily and much of Italy, Frederick built upon the work of his Norman predecessors and forged an early absolutist state bound together by an efficient secular bureaucracy. He was known by the appellation Stupor mundi ('Wonder of the World') and maintains a reputation as a Renaissance man avant la lettre and polymath: a visionary statesman, an inspired naturalist, scholar, mathematician, architect, poet and composer. Frederick also reportedly spoke six languages: Latin, Sicilian, Middle High German, Old French, Greek, and Arabic. As an avid patron of science and the arts, he played a major role in promoting literature through the Sicilian School of poetry. His Sicilian imperial-royal court in Palermo, beginning around 1220, was the cultural and intellectual hub of the early 13th century and saw the first use of a literary form of an Italo-Romance language, Sicilian. The poetry that emanated from the school had a significant influence on literature and on what was to become the modern Italian language. He was also the first monarch to formally outlaw trial by ordeal, which had come to be viewed as superstitious.

Though Frederick's line was still in a strong position at the time of his death, it did not survive for long, and the House of Hohenstaufen came to an end. Furthermore, the Holy Roman Empire entered a long period of decline during the Great Interregnum. His complex political and cultural legacy has continued to attract fierce debate and fascination to this day.

== Birth and naming ==
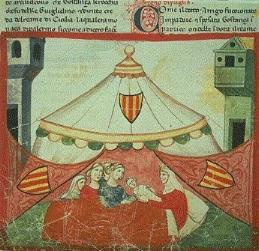
The birth of Frederick on the market square of Jesi from the Nuova Cronica, Biblioteca Apostolica Vaticana, ms. Chigi L. VIII.296 (cat. XI.8).

Born in Jesi, near Ancona, Italy, on 26 December 1194, Frederick was the son of Holy Roman Emperor Henry VI and Queen Constance I of Sicily. He was known as the puer Apuliae (son of Apulia). (Note: The name is the chapter heading for his early years in Kantorowicz.) Frederick was baptised in Assisi, in the church of San Rufino. At birth, his mother named him Constantine. (Note: There is some doubt of this because the sources are not exactly contemporary. The Annales Stadenses and Cronica Reinhardsbrunnensis both record his birth name.) This name, a masculine form of his mother's name, served to identify him closely with both his Norman heritage and his imperial heritage (through Constantine the Great, the first Christian emperor). It was still his name at the time of his election as King of the Romans. He was only given his grandfathers' names, becoming Frederick Roger (or Roger Frederick), at his baptism when he was two years old. (Note: His double name at baptism is recorded by Roger of Howden and the fact that the order was not important is made clear in the Annales Casinenses; however, Houben believes that he was probably only baptized under the name Frederick.) This dual name served the same purpose as Constantine: emphasising his dual heritage.

Frederick's birth was accompanied by gossip and rumour on account of his mother's advanced age. According to Albert of Stade and Salimbene, he was not the son of Henry and Constance but was presented to Henry as his own after a faked pregnancy. His real father was variously described as a butcher of Jesi, a physician, a miller or a falconer. Frederick's birth was also associated with a prophecy of Merlin. According to Andrea Dandolo, writing at some distance but probably recording contemporary gossip, Henry doubted reports of his wife's pregnancy and was only convinced by consulting Joachim of Fiore, who confirmed that Frederick was his son by interpretation of Merlin's prophecy and the Erythraean Sibyl. A later legend claims that Constance gave birth in the public square of Jesi to silence doubters. Constance took unusual measures to prove her pregnancy and its legitimacy and Roger of Howden reports that she swore on the gospels before a papal legate that Frederick was her son by Henry. It is probable that these public acts of affirmation on account of her age gave rise to some false rumours.

In the spring of 1195, a few months after her husband Henry had been crowned king of Sicily and not long after the birth of her son, Empress Constance continued her journey to Palermo. After the unexpected death of his wife's nephew Tancred of Lecce, Henry had hurried over to assume power and to have himself crowned king. Frederick was entrusted to the care of the Duchess of Spoleto, whose husband, Conrad I of Urslingen, had been named Duke by Frederick Barbarossa. The young Frederick stayed in Foligno, a place located in papal territory, until the death of his father, on 28 September 1197.

== Minority ==
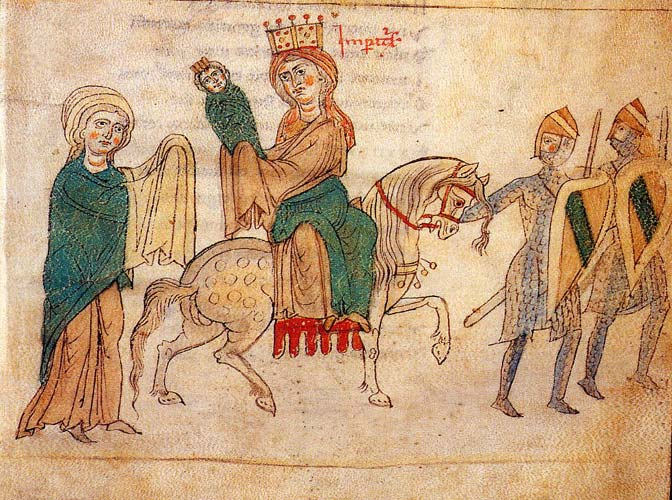
Constance handing her son over to the care of the duchess of Spoleto, the wife of Conrad of Urslingen, from the Liber ad honorem Augusti by Peter of Eboli.

In 1196 at Frankfurt am Main, the infant Frederick was elected King of the Romans and thus heir to his father's Imperial crown. His rights in Germany were to end up disputed by Henry's brother Philip of Swabia and Otto of Brunswick. At the death of his father Henry VI in 1197, Frederick was in Italy, travelling towards Germany, when the bad news reached his guardian, Conrad of Spoleto. Frederick was hastily brought back to his mother Constance in Palermo, Sicily, where he was crowned King of Sicily on 17 May 1198, at just three years of age. Originally his title had been Romanorum et Sicilie rex (King of the Romans and Sicily), but in 1198, after Constance (who kept using title of Empress) found out that Philip of Swabia had been recognized by the supporters of the Hohenstaufen dynasty in Germany, she had her son renounce the title King of the Romans. She probably agreed with Philip that Frederick's prospects in Germany were hopeless. The decision strengthened Frederick's position in Sicily as this satisfied both Philip of Swabia and Pope Innocent III, who did not like the idea of a ruler who had authority in both Sicily and the North Alpine realm.

Constance of Sicily was in her own right queen of Sicily, and she established herself as regent. Constance sided with the pope, who preferred that Sicily and the Germans be ruled under separate governments. She renounced the authority over the Sicilian state church to the papal side, but only as Sicilian queen and not as empress, seemingly with the intention of keeping options open for Frederick. Upon Constance's death in 1198, Pope Innocent III succeeded as Frederick's guardian. Frederick's tutor during this period was Cardinal Cencio Savelli, who would become Pope Honorius III.

Markward of Annweiler, with the support of Henry's brother, Philip of Swabia, reclaimed the regency for himself and soon after invaded the Kingdom of Sicily. In 1200, with the help of Genoese ships, he landed in Sicily and seized the young Frederick one year later. He thus ruled Sicily until 1202, when he was succeeded by another German captain, William of Capparone, who kept Frederick under his control in the royal palace of Palermo until 1206.

Frederick was subsequently placed under the supervision of his tutor Walter of Palearia until he was declared of age in 1208. At that time, he spoke five languages: Greek, Arabic, Latin, Provençal and Sicilian. His first task upon coming of age was to reassert his power over Sicily and southern Italy, where local barons and adventurers had usurped most of the authority. Pope Innocent was in search of a diplomatic match for his protege Frederick to enable successful alliances for him in the future. Eventually, Constance of Aragon was found. Constance was a widow of the late Emeric, King of Hungary, and double his age.

Frederick's childhood had been turbulent as he passed through the hands of a collection of self-serving, scheming regents while the Sicilian nobility grabbed much of the royal demesne and wealth. Some chroniclers report that the young king was so destitute that he had to seek shelter among the citizens of Palermo. Frederick had no stable intimate relationships apart from, perhaps, a few members of his personal household. However, the young king quickly grew to be a formidable and fiercely individualistic personality. He seems to have been highly precocious and insatiably inquisitive, impatient of restraint, with coarse manners, and already convinced of his own sense of royalty. Even in his younger years, Frederick was an avid reader and passionately interested in nature and the study of the universe. Some reports have him freely wandering the streets of cosmopolitan Palermo, talking and arguing with all manner of people, and always devouring knowledge.

== Securing the Imperial Crown ==
=== Election as King of the Romans ===
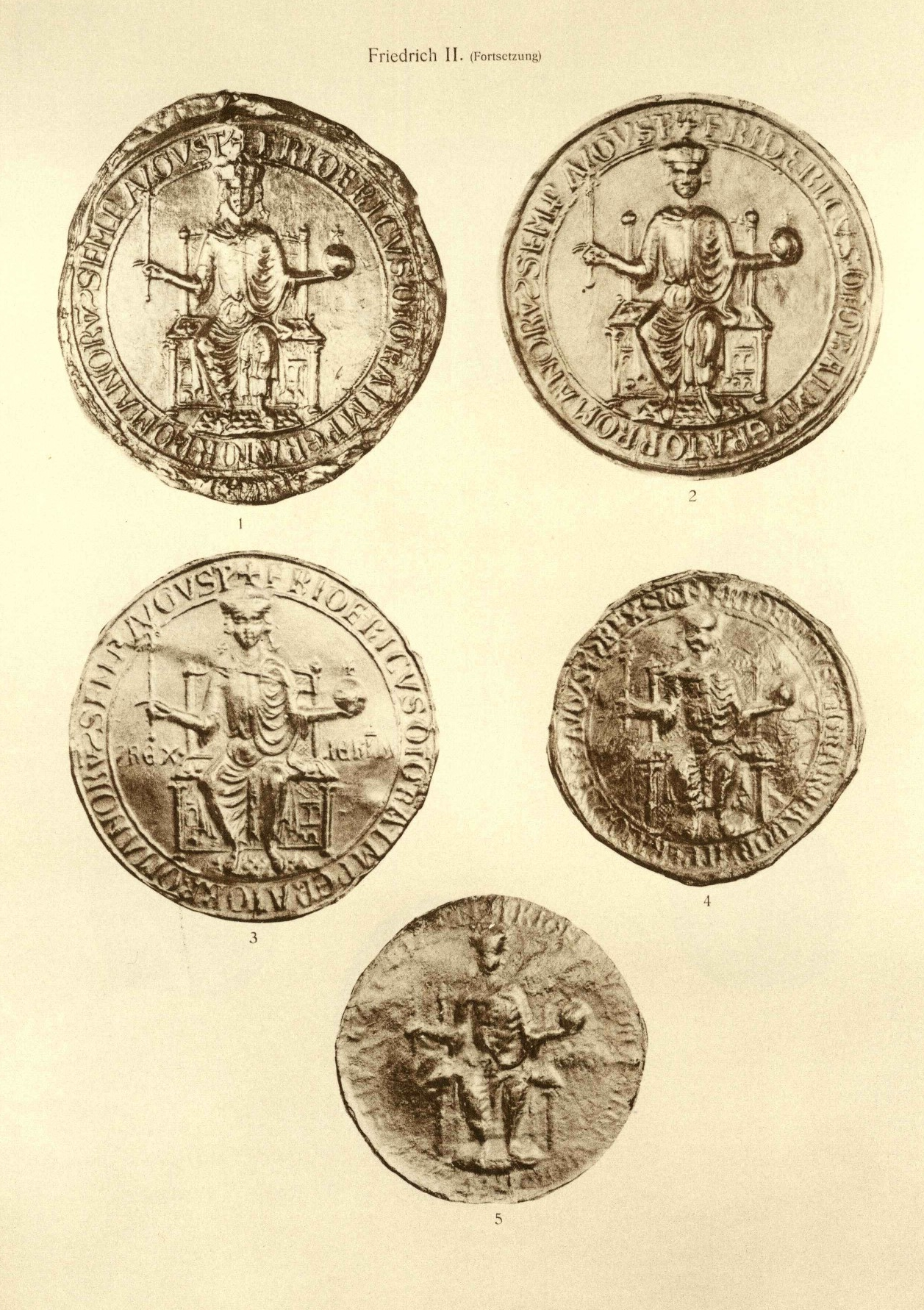
Seals used by Frederick as Emperor (ed. Otto Posse 1909): 1: first Imperial seal (1221–1225), 2: second Imperial seal (1226), 3: third Imperial seal, addition of the title of King of Jerusalem (1226–1250) 4: seal used in 1221 and 1225, 5: first seal as King of Jerusalem (1233).

Otto of Brunswick had been crowned Holy Roman Emperor as Otto IV by Pope Innocent III in October 1209. In southern Italy, Otto became the champion of those noblemen and barons who feared Frederick's increasingly strong measures to check their power, such as the dismissal of the pro-noble Walter of Palearia. The new emperor invaded Italy, where he reached Calabria without meeting much resistance.

In response, Innocent sided against Otto, and in September 1211, at the Diet of Nuremberg, Frederick was elected in absentia as German King by a rebellious faction backed by the pope. Innocent also excommunicated Otto, who was forced to return to Germany. Frederick sailed to Gaeta with a small following. He agreed with the pope on a future separation between the Sicilian and Imperial titles and named his wife Constance as regent. Passing through Lombardy and Engadin, he reached Konstanz in September 1212, preceding Otto by a few hours.

Frederick was crowned King of Germany on 9 December 1212 in Mainz. Frederick's authority in Germany remained tenuous, and he was recognized only in southern Germany. In the region of northern Germany, the centre of pro-papal Guelph power, Otto continued to hold the reins of royal and Imperial power despite his excommunication. After Otto's decisive military defeat at the Battle of Bouvines, the German princes, supported by Innocent III, again elected Frederick King of Germany in 1215, and he was crowned in Aachen in mid-July 1215 by one of the three German archbishops.

=== Consolidating power in Germany ===
After his defeat at Bouvines, Otto's Guelph coalition in Germany and his alliance with King John of England collapsed, and he withdrew to the Guelph hereditary lands where he died virtually without supporters in 1218. Frederick secured the submission of the Rhineland and Lower Lorraine, and by 1215, key cities, including Aachen and Cologne, fell to Frederick, often without resistance. His coronation at Aachen was reinforced by symbolic gestures linking him to Charlemagne and by his unexpected announcement to take the cross, which elevated his stature while subtly asserting independence from papal direction even if it also seems to have been expression of youthful idealism.

Frederick II's early years in Germany were a purposeful mix of concession, coercion and careful political alignment. His rapid royal progress restored order across southern Germany, harshly punishing disorder while distributing lands, privileges, and rights to princes and cities to secure loyalty. The energy and assiduity with which he refashioned Hohenstaufen preeminence steadily gained him fame and respect in Germany. He also continued to build on his alliance with the French monarchy and in 1218, he helped King Philip II of France and Duke Odo III of Burgundy bring an end to the War of Succession in Champagne (France) by invading Lorraine, capturing and burning Nancy, capturing Duke Theobald I of Lorraine and forcing him to withdraw his support from Erard of Brienne-Ramerupt. Crucially, Frederick realized that position at this point depended on both the German princes—especially ecclesiastical ones—and the papacy. At Eger in 1213, he reaffirmed extensive concessions to Pope Innocent III, binding himself to papal interests in exchange for legitimacy. Later he issued the Confoederatio cum principibus ecclesiasticis which confirmed the regalia privileges of the German ecclesiastical princes which they had effectively gathered during the past decade of civil war in exchange for support for his dynasty. This tactic of building consensus among the princes for the Hohenstaufen cause yielded real rewards. In 1220, after Innocent's death (1216), the succession of the new pope, Honorius III, and careful negotiations with the German princes, Frederick secured the election of his eldest son, Henry, as King of the Romans. In so doing, he successfully outmaneuvered the papacy whose constant fear was encirclement between imperial Italy and the Sicilian kingdom, all unified under a single emperor. By a cunning sleight of hand, Frederick had managed to retain his grip on his territories in southern Italy as de jure regent for his son while Henry remained in Germany as its junior king.

Despite his extraordinary success in winning the German crown, rebuilding Hohenstaufen control and circumventing the papacy, Frederick's German policy was constrained by structural realities. Over the previous generations, royal power in Germany had intrinsically shifted toward the territorial princes, particularly the ecclesiastical princes, who exercised near-sovereign authority, while urban economic growth was also beginning to reshape the dynamics between the crown and the increasingly powerful imperial cities. Frederick concentrated on creating consensus among the princes for his authority while also reconstituting the Hohenstaufen dynastic domain in southern Germany. From this perspective, Frederick's policy in Germany was not fundamentally different than those of his Hohenstaufen predecessors. Indeed, it was in many ways an expression of the structural realities of power in medieval Germany generally. It would, therefore, be a mistake to view Frederick's authority in Germany to be inherently weak or negligent—as some older German historiography has maintained, much less as a break with a broader continuity of dynastic power politics in Germany. In fact, the formidable Hohenstaufen domain in Germany had been mostly recovered by the close of Frederick's reign and the subsequent civil war and power vacuum after his death. However, unlike most Holy Roman emperors, Frederick would base himself primarily in Italy, and he spent comparatively few years in Germany. After his imperial coronation later in 1220, Frederick remained either in the Kingdom of Sicily or on Crusade until 1235, when he made his last journey to Germany. He returned to Italy in 1237 and stayed there for the remaining thirteen years of his life, represented in Germany by his son Conrad. Frederick's policy was rooted in larger design. Rather than attempting to build centralized royal authority in Germany first, something none of the German emperors every really managed to do, Frederick pursued a broader imperial vision: establishing firm sovereignty in Sicily, extending it into Italy, and only then, once he had sufficient resources, exerting more centralized power in Germany as part of a wider imperial framework. His so-called concessions in Germany were therefore a policy of pragmatic and tactical consensus-building as part of a larger project of constructing a trans-regional empire rooted in Roman imperial universalism.

=== Imperial coronation ===
It was not until another five years had passed from his coronation as German king, and only after further negotiations between Frederick, Innocent III, and later on Pope Honorius III were agreed, that Frederick would receive an imperial coronation in Rome as Holy Roman Emperor. Meanwhile, Frederick delayed his departure for Rome until he had secured both Germany and Italy. He worked through legates to stabilize northern and central Italy, achieving partial pacification and extracting recognition of his authority from key cities, including Milan by 1220. When he finally entered Italy, Frederick proceeded carefully, avoiding conflict with the Lombard cities while selectively confirming privileges and maintaining papal favor through pro-church legislation. At the same time, he refused to commit on matters regarding his Sicilian crown, signaling that it would remain the core of his power. By the winter of 1220, Frederick had arrived in Rome and was crowned Holy Roman Emperor on 20 November. At the same time, Frederick's oldest son formally took the title of King of the Romans as Henry (VII). With the imperial crown officially his, Frederick moved south to stabilize his southern kingdom.

== Restoring the Kingdom of Sicily ==
=== The Assizes of Capua ===
By late 1220 Frederick crossed into southern Italy determined to rebuild the authority of the Sicilian crown, which had heavily waned over the preceding two decades. Under his grandfather, Roger II, and successors William I and William II, the Norman kingdom of Sicily was arguably the most centralized state in all of Europe. However, during the years of Frederick's minority, subsequent regents had allowed the nobility to grab much of the Crown's power and domain. The Crown was weak, and its effective power did not extend far beyond Palermo.

In the first of three great legislative acts, Frederick issued the Assizes of Capua soon after his return to the kingdom in December 1220 which built on the Assizes of Ariano of Roger II. The legislation was already prepared before Frederick's return, down to the last detail, and he seized the earliest opportunity to publish them in the first city of the realm in which he stopped. This shows the Emperor's impatience to immediately bring home to his subjects that the time of lawlessness was at an end. The Assizes of Capua demanded the restoration of all royal lands and castles to the state they were in at the death of William II, the last legitimate Norman king. All privileges accorded to anyone whatsoever since the end of William II's reign were ordered to be submitted for confirmation to the Royal Chancery before Easter 1221 for the mainland provinces and before Whitsun of the same year for the island of Sicily. This sweeping decree covered the entirety of royal grants made during the last thirty years, from the greatest fiefs to the smallest individual holdings, along with the collection of tolls and other perquisites. Spurious legal means and forged documents used to grab land from the royal domain since the death of William II were comprehensively revoked pending revision by the Royal Chancery, creating an ideal means of determining which legal fiefs and privileges really did exist. This proved a shrewd stroke and returned the monopoly on justice to the Crown. The laws promulgated at Capua also regulated the present tenure of fiefs and provided for their future control by the Emperor. Their holders could neither marry, nor could their children inherit directly, without the sovereign's consent, affording Frederick the possibility for constant reversion of fiefs, and a potent means of keeping control over not only the actual holder but his heir as well.

=== Subduing the Sicilian Barons and the Assizes of Messina ===
The Assizes of Capua created the legal basis for Frederick's action against opposition to his supremacy and the resumption of crown lands and castles. Frederick used legal trickery to confiscate the lands of some of the most powerful barons and exile them from the kingdom. The Emperor launched a campaign against the barons who did not submit to the decree. The barons who resisted him were besieged in their castles and, when captured, either exiled or sometimes executed and their families sold into slavery. However, the Emperor did not conduct these operations in person. He delegated important barons to subdue opposition, then used the lesser nobility against these barons, and resorted to the most Machiavellian of means to break resistance. He wrote to one of his captains:

″Pretend some business and warily call the Castellan to you. Seize on him if you can and keep him till he cause the castle to be surrendered to you.″

Over the course of 1221–1222, Frederick had subdued most of the resistance on the mainland and restored much of the royal domain. A whole series of further fortresses were conquered, destroyed or newly fortified, amongst them Naples, Gaeta, Aversa, and Foggia. Only Thomas of Celano, Count of Molise, offered serious resistance in his redoubts in the Abruzzi. After a long campaign, however, his fortresses of Roccamandolfi and Ovindoli surrendered, and he was banished. As punishment for its resistance, the town of Celano was razed and its inhabitants deported to Sicily.

The Count of Molise's defeat saw the end of baronial resistance on the mainland, and the power of the greater nobility had been utterly broken. Frederick II began to construct fortresses across the mainland to impose order across the region. These fortresses were massive and utilitarian in nature, showing nothing but a mathematically simple design of stern right-angles, with no residential quarters, and garrisoned by state troops at the expense of the local nobility. The loosely-knit framework of a feudal kingdom, fractured by years of decline, was steadily succeeded by the firm "architecture of a state".

In the spring of 1221, Frederick issued assizes in Messina concerned with municipal administration. These included regulations for public order, prostitution, and distinctive clothing for Jews. The maritime powers of Genoa and Pisa had long dominated trade in Sicily, taking advantage of the instability during the last decades. Frederick ejected Genoese traders from Syracuse and withdrew all concessions granted to Genoa in Palermo, Messina, Trapani, and other ports during the last three decades. Genoese and Pisan warehouses were confiscated by the state. Frederick also reestablished the Sicilian navy with provisions based on older Norman laws whereby certain fief holders, including cities and towns of the realm, were bound to furnish timbers or money for shipbuilding and provide for the maintenance of the fleet. These laws were brought into full force again, while Frederick erected new state wharves. By the end of 1221, the emperor already had two squadrons at sea. In the course of Frederick's reign, the Sicilian fleet again became a formidable force in the Mediterranean, rivalled only by those of the maritime republics.

=== Relocation of the Sicilian Muslims ===
Worried by the independent rule the Sicilian Muslim population developed since his departure in 1212, Frederick waged conflict against the enclaves of Muslim resistance which had long refused to recognize royal authority. The campaign against the Muslim resistance in mountain holds was difficult, but several were steadily occupied. According to one account, the leader of the rebels, Amir Ibn Abbad, was compelled to sue for peace to Frederick who, incensed by the former's mistreatment of Imperial messengers, tore open the Amir's side with his spur, then had both the Amir and his sons hanged.

Between 1221 and the 1230s, the Muslim population of Sicily was deported on mainland Italy. The town of Lucera was emptied of its Christian inhabitants and replaced with the deported Muslims of Sicily, who were allowed complete religious autonomy in exchange for a special tax. Frederick enlisted six hundred as his personal bodyguards and several thousand as a relatively large standing army. The deportation and resettlement of the Sicilian Muslims revealed the Emperor's "rare enlightenment" and extraordinary objectivity among his contemporaries, proving to be a masterstroke of bold statecraft; Frederick had not only turned the rebellious Muslims of Sicily into obedient and valuable subjects, totally dependent on his protection but also secured a permanent military force whose loyalty could be relied on against his Christian enemies or papal hostility.

=== Hohenstaufen Cornerstone ===
In the space of a few years, Frederick II had restored royal authority in the kingdom of Sicily and reversed several decades of decline in the realm. The kingdom had been revived and once again stood centre stage in European politics. During this process, the Emperor had shown himself to be an astute and devious politician, as well as an state-builder. His reputation as a driven and energetic monarch spread, adding to his status. The Capuan Assizes laid the groundwork for the broad reorganization of government which Frederick would expand dramatically with the Constitutions of Melfi in 1231, leaving behind a lasting influence on the history of European statehood. By his actions, Frederick could rely on a formidable power base from which he could launch his grand ambitions. The kingdom of Sicily would provide the bulk of his resources and remain the jewel among his vast collection of territories. Over the course of the Emperor's reign, the Regno (Kingdom of Sicily) would become the most sophisticated European state of the Middle Ages and a vibrant epicentre of culture in the Mediterranean. Frederick's firm grip on his southern kingdom would survive invasion, conspiracy, excommunications, and war with his enemies in Lombardy and the papacy. The strong position he bequeathed to his successors was fundamentally rooted in the Regno and was a much-coveted prize by the enemies of the Hohenstaufen, but it eventually suffered disintegration and fracture under the Angevins later in the 13th century.

== The Sixth Crusade and the War of the Keys ==
=== The Delaying Crusader and Early Policies in Northern Italy ===
At the time he was elected King of the Romans, Frederick promised to go on a crusade. He continually delayed, however, and, in spite of his renewal of this vow at his coronation as the King of Germany, he did not travel to Egypt with the armies of the Fifth Crusade in 1217. He sent forces to Egypt under the command of Louis I, Duke of Bavaria, but constant expectation of his arrival caused papal legate Pelagius to reject Ayyubid sultan Al-Kamil's offer to restore the Latin Kingdom of Jerusalem to the crusaders in exchange for their withdrawal from Egypt and caused the Crusade to continually stall in anticipation of his ever-delayed arrival. The crusade ended in failure with the loss of Damietta in 1221. Frederick was blamed by both Pope Honorius III and the general Christian populace for this calamitous defeat.

In 1225, after agreeing with Pope Honorius to launch a Crusade before 1228, Frederick summoned an Imperial Diet at Cremona, the main pro-Imperial city in Lombardy: the main arguments for holding the Diet would be to continue the struggle against heresy, to organize the crusade and, above all, to restore the imperial power in northern Italy, which had long been usurped by the numerous communes located there. Those assembled responded with the reformation of the Lombard League, which had already defeated his grandfather Frederick Barbarossa in the 12th century, and again Milan was chosen as the League's leader. The Diet was cancelled, however, and the situation was stabilized only through a compromise reached by Honorius between Frederick and the League. During his sojourn in northern Italy, Frederick probably also invested the Teutonic Order with the territories in what would become East Prussia with the Golden Bull of Rimini, starting what was later called the Northern Crusade. Some historians have suggested, however, that the bull was actually issued later in 1235 and was backdated to 1226.

Frederick was distracted with the League when in June 1226, Louis VIII of France laid siege to Avignon, an imperial city. The barons of the French army sent a letter to Frederick defending their action as a military necessity, and a few days after the start of the siege, Henry (VII) ratified an alliance with France that had been signed in 1223.

=== First Excommunication ===
Problems of stability within the empire delayed Frederick's departure on the crusade. It was not until 1225, when, by proxy, Frederick had married Isabella II of Jerusalem, heiress to the Kingdom of Jerusalem, that his departure seemed assured. Frederick immediately saw to it that his new father-in-law John of Brienne, the current king of Jerusalem, was dispossessed and his rights transferred to the emperor. In August 1227, Frederick set out for the Holy Land from Brindisi but was forced to return when he was struck down by an epidemic that had broken out. It seems clear that the emperor's illness was genuine, and some of his captains, such as his friend Landgrave Louis IV of Thuringia were stricken and died. Even the master of the Teutonic Knights, Hermann of Salza, recommended that he return to the mainland to recuperate. Frederick decided to forestall the voyage until the next year and sent an embassy to Rome to explain the circumstances of his decision. Nevertheless, on 29 September 1227, Frederick was excommunicated by Pope Gregory IX for failing to honour his crusading pledge. Gregory IX had made no effort to verify Frederick II's illness, instead hastily excommunicating him and using the moment to attack a political rival. His official charges—especially those presented to Christendom—were exaggerated or misleading, focusing on crusading failures while masking a deeper demand that Frederick surrender sovereignty over Sicily to the papacy. Many accusations were demonstrably false or distorted, suggesting deliberate misrepresentation aimed at turning opinion against the emperor and forcing his submission.

Yet several contemporary chroniclers still doubted the sincerity of Frederick's illness, and their attitude may be explained by their pro-papal leanings. Roger of Wendover, a chronicler of the time, wrote that Frederick:

went to the Mediterranean sea, and embarked with a small retinue; but after pretending to make for the Holy Land for three days, he said that he was seized with a sudden illness [...] this conduct of the emperor redounded much to his disgrace, and to the injury of the whole business of the crusade.

=== Sixth Crusade and the Treaty of Jaffa ===
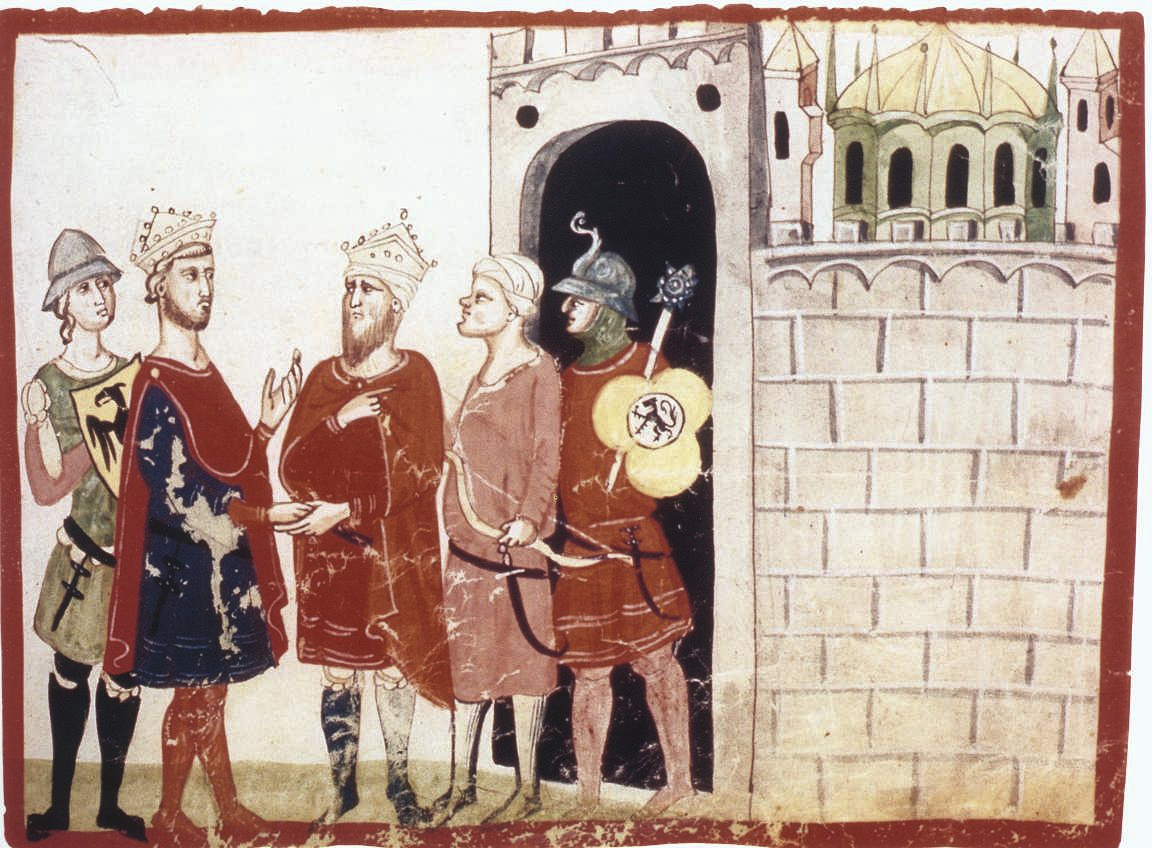
Frederick II (left) meets Al-Kamil (right). Nuova Cronica, c. 1348

Frederick eventually sailed again from Brindisi in June 1228. Gregory IX, surprised by the emperor's defiance, regarded this action as a provocation, since, as an excommunicate, Frederick was technically not capable of conducting a crusade. Gregory excommunicated the emperor a second time. Frederick's crusade in the East began with his attempt to assert imperial authority over Cyprus, but his tactless and high-handling of the Cypriot barons—especially John of Ibelin—created immediate tension and mistrust. After arriving at Acre in September, the emperor quickly recognized that success would have to come through diplomacy rather than war. The crusading army was already a small force and papal hostility and divisions among the crusaders undermined his position. Many of the local nobility, the Templars, and Hospitallers were also reluctant to offer overt support. Frederick therefore opened communication with the Al-Kamil, who also faced internal Islamic conflicts. Frederick recognized that the Egyptian sultan had little practical use for the city of Jerusalem and had a greater political disregard for the Muslim-held city of Damascus. On this basis, negotiations with al-Kamil proceeded slowly amid the two sovereign's mutual political constraints pressures. On the emperor's side, suspicion from Christian leaders around Frederick's cultural engagement with Muslim envoys further damaged his standing. At the same time, Gregory IX intervened directly against Frederick's lieutenants in Italy and continued papal opposition placed urgent pressure on Frederick to secure a result in the Holy Land before while his authority at home was threatened. The emperor and the sultan exchanged philosophical and mathematical questions, poetry, artistic interests and steadily built a workable dialogue. The two rulers signed the treaty 18 February 1229. The treaty agreed to the restitution of Jerusalem for a period of 10 years along with Nazareth, Bethlehem, and a small coastal strip to the Kingdom of Jerusalem, though there are disagreements as to the extent of the territory returned. The treaty also stipulated that the Dome of the Rock and al-Aqsa Mosque were to remain under Muslim control and that the city of Jerusalem would remain without fortifications.

The treaty, however much an astonishing product of Frederick's diplomacy as it appeared, lacked broad support among both Christians and Muslims. It was effectively a personal agreement between Frederick and al-Kamil rather than a settlement endorsed by their respective communities. Virtually all other crusaders, including the Templars and Hospitallers, condemned this deal as a political ploy on the part of Frederick to regain his kingdom while betraying the cause of the Crusaders. Al-Kamil, who was nervous about possible war with his relatives who ruled Syria and Mesopotamia, wished to avoid further trouble from the Christians, at least until his domestic rivals were subdued.

The crusade ended in a truce with Frederick's coronation as King of Jerusalem on 18 March 1229, although this was technically improper. Frederick's wife Isabella, the heiress, had died, leaving their infant son Conrad as rightful king. There is also disagreement as to whether the "coronation" was a coronation at all, as a letter written by Frederick to Henry III of England suggests that the crown he placed on his own head was in fact the Imperial crown of the Romans.

At his coronation, he may have worn the red silk mantle that had been crafted during the reign of Roger II. It bore an Arabic inscription indicating that the robe dated from the year 528 in the Muslim calendar (1133–34), and incorporated a generic benediction, wishing its wearer "vast prosperity, great generosity and high splendour, fame and magnificent endowments, and the fulfilment of his wishes and hopes. May his days and nights go in pleasure without end or change." This coronation robe can be found today in the Schatzkammer of the Kunsthistorisches Museum in Vienna.

In any case, Gerald of Lausanne, the Latin Patriarch of Jerusalem, did not attend the ceremony; indeed, the next day, the Bishop of Caesarea arrived to place the city under interdict on the patriarch's orders. Frederick's further attempts to rule over the Kingdom of Jerusalem were met by resistance on the part of the barons, led by John of Ibelin, Lord of Beirut. By the early 1240s, Frederick's viceroy, Richard Filangieri, was forced to leave Acre, and in 1244, following a siege, Jerusalem itself was lost again to a new Muslim offensive. Frederick retained technical regency over the kingdom for his son by Isabella II, Conrad, during this period but he exercised little effective power. By 1243, he seems to have sold his rights over Jerusalem to Queen Alice of Cyprus as de facto regent of Jerusalem for Conrad and subsequently her son, Hugh of Cyprus. However, Frederick still apparently regarded the kingdom as within his imperial sphere of influence and left stipulations in his will for its succession to Henry Charles Otto, his son by his third wife, Isabella of England.

Whilst Frederick's seemingly bloodless recovery of Jerusalem for the cross brought him great prestige in some European circles, his decision to complete the crusade while excommunicated provoked Church hostility. Although in 1230 the pope lifted Frederick's excommunication, this decision was taken for a variety of reasons related to the political situation in Europe. Of Frederick's crusade, Philip of Novara, a chronicler of the period, said: "The emperor left Acre [after the conclusion of the truce]; hated, cursed, and vilified." Overall, this crusade, arguably the first successful one since the First Crusade, was adversely affected by the Church's refusal to support the emperor's settlement as an excommunicate. Because of this and the papal invasion of his Sicilian kingdom, Frederick was compelled to leave behind the kingdom of Jerusalem torn between his agents and the local nobility in a civil war known as the War of the Lombards.

The itinerant Joachimite preachers and many radical Franciscans, the Spirituals, supported Frederick. Against the interdict pronounced on his lands, the preachers condemned the pope and continued to minister the sacraments and grant absolutions. Brother Arnold in Swabia proclaimed the Second Coming for 1260, at which time Frederick would then confiscate the riches of Rome and distribute them among the poor, the "only true Christians".

Frederick's enterprise in the Levant was, perhaps, a watershed in the history of the crusading movement. For the first time, a Latin monarch—and the most preeminent one, at that—had set out to crusade without the blessing of the pope and, indeed, had acted independently with much papal hostility. The emperor's actions set a precedent for increasingly more monarch-directed crusades in the following generations, less subordinate to the papacy and more overtly motivated by narrower partisan political goals. Indeed, the papacy itself had already begun to refashion crusading as a weapon against its opponents.

=== War of the Keys ===
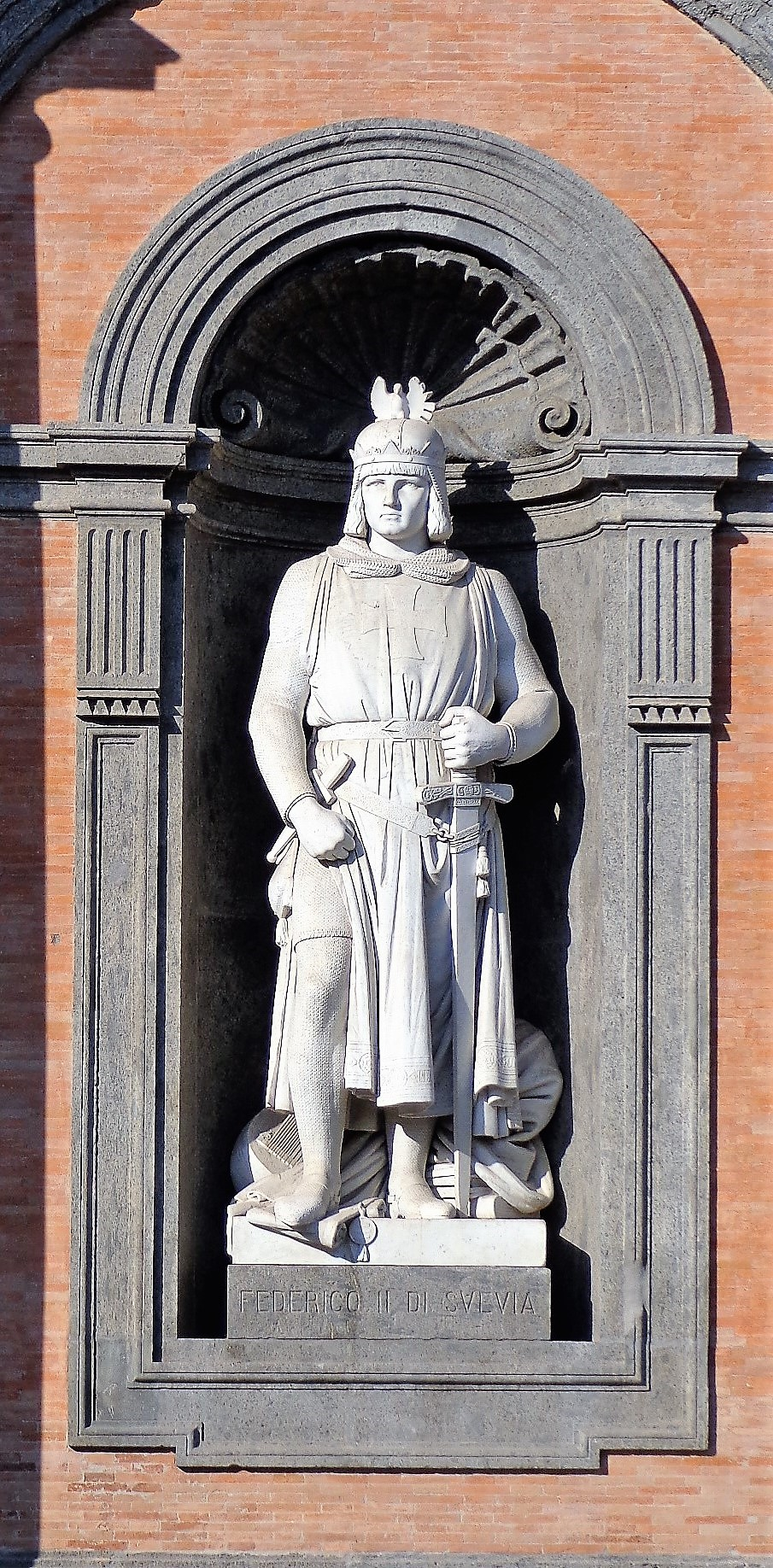
Frederick II's statue in Palazzo Reale di Napoli by Emanuele Caggiano (1888).

During Frederick's stay in the Holy Land, his regent, Rainald of Spoleto, had attacked the March of Ancona and the Duchy of Spoleto. Gregory IX used this as pretext for direct military action against the emperor, and called for an unprecedented crusade against Frederick, hoping to seize the Kingdom of Sicily. Gregory collected church funds from across Europe to support the effort and recruited an army under the emperor's former father in law, John of Brienne. In 1229, John invaded southern Italy at the head of a sizable force. His troops overcame an initial resistance at Montecassino and reached into Campania as far as the Volturno–Calore Irpino. The papacy and its supporters had fanned rumours that the emperor had in fact died while in the Holy Land. As such, Frederick's arrival in Brindisi in June 1229 surprised his opponents and reversed the momentum. The emperor immediately took the situation in hand and rallied loyal forces across Sicily, where support surged in response to news of his arrival.

With a strengthened army made up of loyalist forces in the kingdom along with elements of returning crusaders such as the Teutonic Order, Frederick rapidly reconquered his kingdom while the papal armies—undermined by lack of funds and collapsing morale—retreated in disorder. By late 1229, Frederick had fully restored his control, punishing the towns and rebel barons which had defected. However, he chose not to extend the campaign beyond the northern borders of the kingdom into the papal lands around Rome. Instead, he shifted toward reconciliation with Gregory IX, judging that lifting the excommunication was essential for reinforcing his broader position in the perception of Christendom. The war came to an end with the Treaty of San Germano in July 1230. On 28 August, in a public ceremony at Ceprano, the papal legates Thomas of Capua and Giovanni Colonna absolved Frederick and lifted his excommunication. Next, the emperor personally met Gregory IX at Anagni, making some concessions to the church in Sicily. Frederick's concessions—mainly clerical privileges and property restorations—were relatively limited and largely tactical. It was a calculus to preserve his fundamental sovereignty and secure space to solidify his southern kingdom.

== Zenith ==
=== Constitutions of Melfi and Court Patronage ===
The papal invasion exposed some of the vulnerabilities of his southern kingdom, and Frederick was determined to enact a broad restructuring of the entire apparatus of government. The reconstitution of the Kingdom of Sicily that followed would prove a milestone in the history of European statehood. In 1231, the emperor issued the Constitutions of Melfi as a comprehensive legal code which sought to centralize royal authority across the Kingdom of Sicily, replacing clerical officialdom with lay jurists trained in Roman law and establishing a tightly hierarchical administrative system reaching from the Emperor down to the most subordinate provincial functionary. The underlying philosophy was explicit: Frederick conceived of the Emperor as the living law upon earth, deriving authority directly from God, with the imperial office serving as the sole source of temporal justice. The code drew on Norman precedent and the emperor's earlier assizes but refashioned in a thoroughly 'Romanized' way, producing something qualitatively new in its breadth and scope. The code was not only a collection of precedents but also a relatively intricate body of royal law which was subject to change only by the sovereign's will and the broad outlines of an entire structure of statehood. As such, the emperor considered the code to be the model framework for his larger territorial empire. Frederick's idea of monarchy also manifested in the famous augustalis, a gold coinage first issued in 1231, which captured something of this synthesis of antiquity and contemporary tradition. A coin of fine quality, it bore the emperor's own image in the manner of the ancient Caesars rather than a Christian symbol and announced in tangible form his conception of a secular imperial authority grounded in classical antiquity and Roman universalism.

In addition to his state-building efforts, the emperor gained prestige through the reputation of his cosmopolitan court. Based primarily in Palermo and Foggia, and accompanying Frederick on his travels, the court became one of the leading intellectual centres of 13th-century Europe. The emperor surrounded himself with scholars, jurists, poets, mathematicians, and natural philosophers drawn from across Europe and the Islamic world, regardless of religion or origin. He took an active interest in intellectual and scholarly pursuits and was known for engaging directly with members of his court. Among the more notable attendants was the Scottish polymath Michael Scotus, astrologer Guido Bonatti, mathematician Leonardo Fibonacci, philosopher Theodore of Antioch, poet Giacomo da Lentini and the jurist Piero della Vigna, who became the emperor's chief minister. Dante Alighieri later identified Frederick II's court as the birthplace of Italian vernacular poetry. Contemporary accounts also described an intellectual environment that combined Roman legal traditions, Arabic philosophy, Eastern Roman administrative influences, and the emerging literary culture of the Italian peninsula. In this way, the court of Frederick was perhaps the last great blossoming of the remarkable Norman-Sicilian cultural synthesis.

=== Henry's Revolt ===
While Frederick may have temporarily made his peace with the pope and cultivated his authority in southern Italy, the situation in Germany was becoming problematic. Frederick's son Henry VII (who was born 1211 in Sicily as the son of Frederick's first wife Constance of Aragon) had provoked the discontent of the German princes with an aggressive policy against their privileges, siding with the cities against the higher nobility and invoking the central authority of the German crown. But he had been quickly outmaneuvered by them, and was forced to agree the Statutum in favorem principum ("Statute in favour of the princes"), issued at Worms, which effectively deprived the German crown of much of its direct sovereignty in theory. Frederick summoned Henry to a meeting, which was held at Aquileia in 1232. Henry confirmed his submission to his father and the German princes reaffirmed their loyalty to the emperor, but Frederick nevertheless felt compelled to confirm the Statutum at Cividale soon afterwards.

The situation in Northern Italy was also tenuous, and all the emperor's attempts to reach a settlement in Lombardy with the help of Gregory IX (at the time, ousted from Rome by a revolt) had yielded very little by 1233. Henry had returned to his fruitless anti-princely policy in Germany, against his father's will. In response, Frederick obtained his son's excommunication from Gregory IX in July 1234 and began preparations to return to Germany. Henry tried to muster an opposition in Germany and asked the Lombard cities to block the Alpine passes. In May 1235, Frederick went to Germany, taking with him no army, only a sumptuous entourage as a display of his power and wealth. The emperor's reputation also travelled before him. News of his arrival spread quickly, and the rebellion disintegrated. As soon as July, he was able to force his son to renounce the crown and all his lands at Worms, where Henry was tried and imprisoned. Henry remained a prisoner in Apulia for the rest of his life until he reportedly committed suicide. In some ways, Henry's unsuccessful policy of pressing for the central authority of the crown in Germany had been not entirely dissimilar to his father's in southern Italy. But, for the emperor, the integrity of the empire as a whole was paramount, and anything that threatened its cohesion or endangered his larger imperial project had to be dealt with ruthlessly. In this vein, Frederick pragmatically turned the complex challenge of Henry's rebellion into a chance to introduce "thorough and groundbreaking" reform of Germany and the way the empire north of the Alps was ruled. The Mainz Landfriede or Constitutio Pacis, decreed at the Imperial Diet of 1235 in Mainz, became one of the basic laws of the empire and provided that the princes should share the burden of local government in Germany. After the crisis of Henry's revolt, it was a testament to Frederick's considerable political strength and image-building, his increased prestige during the early 1230s, and sheer overpowering might that he succeeded in rebinding the princes to Hohenstaufen power.

The Hohenstaufen and the Guelphs also reconciled in 1235. Otto the Child, the grandson of Henry the Lion, had been deposed as Duke of Bavaria and Saxony in 1180, conveying the allodial Guelphic possessions to Frederick, who in return enfeoffed Otto with the same lands and additional former Imperial possessions as the newly established Duke of Brunswick-Lüneburg, ending the unclear status of the German Guelphs, who had been left without title and rank after 1180, and encouraging their cooperation. Sealing his diplomacy, Frederick also married his third wife, Isabella, sister of King Henry III of England, as a marital connection with the old Geulph faction and tactically binding them to his new German settlement.

The emperor's overarching purpose in Germany was to stabilize Hohenstaufen power north of the Alps and raise an army from the German princes to suppress the rebel cities in Lombardy. Most of the princes had broadly subscribed to the settlement of 1235. However, the Duke of Austria, Frederick II, had been at odds with the emperor and had refused the summons to the Diet at Mainz. The emperor placed the Duke under imperial ban. Before he could fully campaign in Lombardy, the quarrelsome Duke had to be dealt with and the emperor assembled a coalition between himself, Wenceslaus I of Bohemia and Otto III of Bavaria, to suppress the Duke. The emperor occupied Vienna where, in February 1237, he obtained the title of King of the Romans for his 9-year-old son Conrad. However, the imperial campaign against the Duke of Austria provoked a backlash. The emperor's erstwhile allies Wenceslaus of Bohemia and Otto of Bavaria, wary of the potential acquisition of Austria as a direct imperial fief, joined with Duke Frederick in opposition and called for a compromise. Rather than risk open conflict in Germany again, the emperor lifted the ban on the Duke in exchange for his re-acceptance of imperial suzerainty with some concessions of autonomy. Over the course of the next two years, the emperor carefully split the Duke from the coalition, with promises of support for Duke Frederick's border claims against Béla IV of Hungary. Eventually, Otto of Bavaria was also won back with the marriage of his daughter to the young King Conrad in 1241. Both Frederick of Austria and Otto of Bavaria subsequently became important imperial allies over the last decade of the emperor's life.

=== The Struggle for Lombardy ===
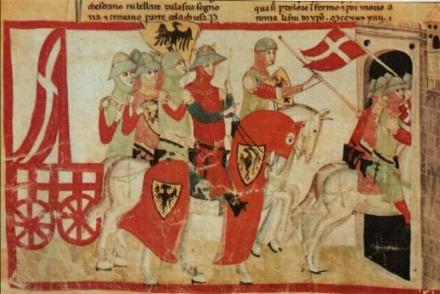
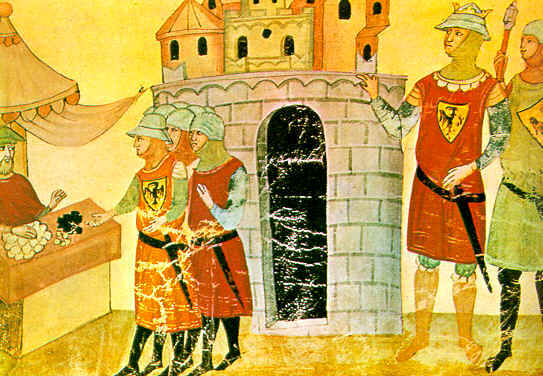
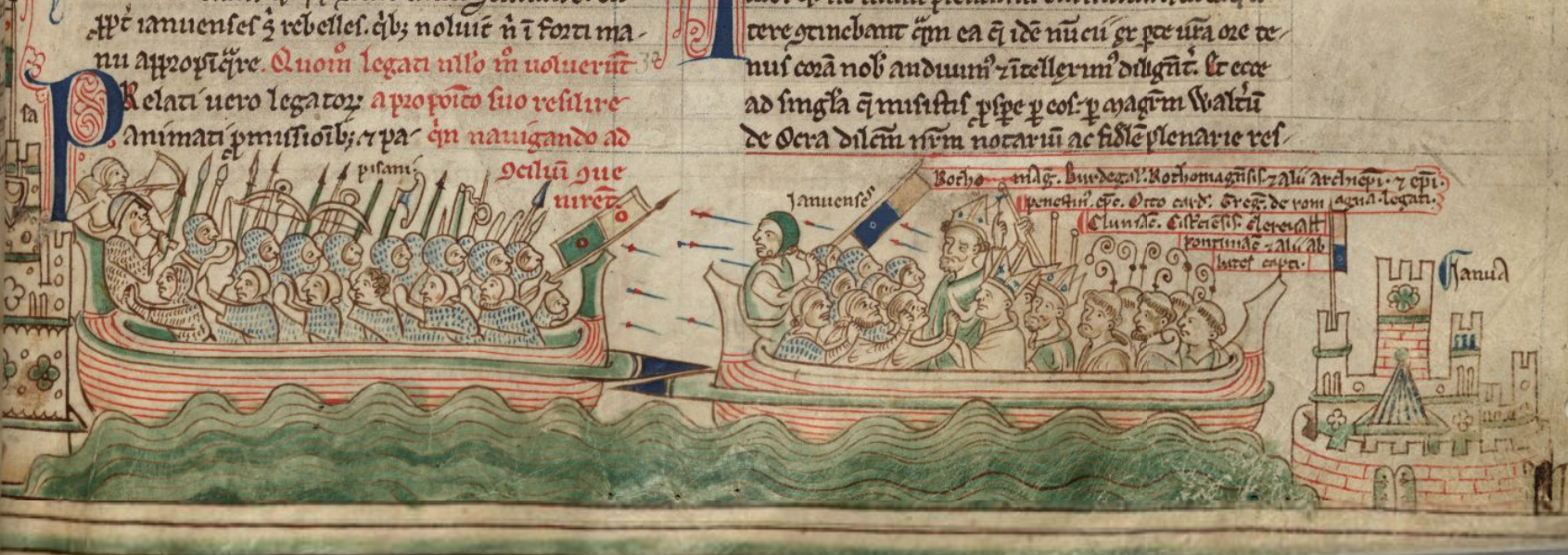
Clockwise from top:
- Miniature from the Nuova Cronica depicting the Battle of Cortenuova against the second Lombard League in 1237
- Miniature from the Nuova Cronica depicting Frederick's troops paid with leather coins during the Siege of Faenza in 1240–41,
- Miniature from the Chronica Maiora depicting the Battle of Giglio against Gregory IX in 1241

With peace north of the Alps, Frederick raised an army from the German princes to suppress the rebel cities in Lombardy. Gregory tried to stop the invasion with diplomatic moves but in vain. After the failure of the negotiations between the Lombard cities, the pope and the Imperial diplomats, Frederick invaded Lombardy from Verona. In November 1237, he won a great victory over the Lombard League at the Battle of Cortenuova, displaying his capability as a strategist and battlefield leader able to manoeuvre and prevail in difficult situations. Frederick celebrated the victory with a triumph in Cremona in the manner of an ancient Roman emperor, with the captured carroccio (later sent to the commune of Rome) and an elephant. The Imperial victory at Cortenuova sent shockwaves around Europe and burnished Frederick's already legendary status. Now at the apex of his power, Frederick's political preeminence was seemingly unassailable and his hegemony was recognized across almost all of Latin Christendom. Not since the days of his father and grandfather, or perhaps even since the heyday of the Ottonians or Salians, had Imperial sovereignty appeared in so a strong position. The emperor seemed to be master of Europe.

With his supremacy now apparently secure, Frederick rejected any suit for conditional peace from his Lombard enemies, even from Milan, his most implacable foe among the cities, which had sent a great sum of money. Perhaps from sober political calculation in light of years of Milanese opposition or simply hatred of the city, he was convinced that only complete military subjection could finally ensure Imperial dominance. The Emperor believed, perhaps, that any peace conducted with the Milanese—which must include the imposition of Imperial rule in the city by his official—would fail, because the Milanese would quickly overthrow his representatives after his departure from the region.

Frederick's demand for total surrender spurred further resistance from Milan, Brescia, Bologna, and Piacenza. In the spring of 1238, Frederick summoned a vast international army to aid in his campaign against the remaining insurgent cities, gathering troops from England, France, Hungary, the Nicene Empire, and even a contingent sent by Muslim sultans in the east. From June, he besieged Brescia. After savage fighting in which the emperor himself was nearly captured, Frederick was surprised at the city's continued defiance in the face of his large army and sent emissaries to negotiate its surrender. Frederick's chief engineer was captured and forced to work against the besieging Imperial forces. The Brescians rejected the emperor's terms, and the siege continued into September, when torrential rains prevented any assault. After a last unsuccessful attack in October, Frederick was forced to raise the siege. Frederick's prestige suffered a blow, and the "legend of the emperor's invincibility" had been damaged. Regrouping as the year closed, it was not Frederick's political nous which failed him but a combination of bad luck and his incorrect assessment of the military resources required to subjugate the last few holdouts against Imperial authority in northern Italy.

=== Second Excommunication ===
Gregory IX sensed vulnerability, and Frederick received the news of his excommunication by the pope in the first months of 1239 while his court was in Padua. The emperor responded by expelling the Franciscans and the Dominicans from Lombardy, taking hostages from important northern Italian families, and electing his son Enzo as Legate General and Imperial Vicar of Lombardy. Enzo soon annexed Romagna, Marche, and the Duchy of Spoleto, nominally part of the Papal States. The emperor ordered Enzo to destroy the Republic of Venice, which had sent some ships against Sicily. In the Regno itself, Frederick remorselessly purged the clergy of any of Gregory's supporters: expelling mendicant friars, arresting suspect priests, replacing wavering bishops with loyal supporters, and filling vacant bishoprics with trusted allies. The Sicilian church effectively became independent of Rome and Frederick's close advisor, Berard of Castagna, Archbishop of Palermo, was appointed its nominal head.

In December 1239, Frederick entered Tuscany and spent Christmas in Pisa. In January 1240, Frederick triumphantly entered Foligno, followed by Viterbo, whence he aimed to finally conquer Rome to restore the ancient splendours of the Empire. Frederick's plan to attack Rome at that time, however, did not come to fruition as he chose to leave for southern Italy where a papal-incited rebellion flared in Apulia. In southern Italy, Frederick attacked and razed the papal enclaves of St Angelo and Benevento. The Emperor remained at the very apex of his power.

In the meantime, the pro-Imperial Ghibelline city of Ferrara had fallen, and Frederick swept his way northwards, capturing Ravenna and, after another long siege, Faenza. The people of Forlì, which had kept its Ghibelline stance even after the collapse of Hohenstaufen power, offered their loyal support during the capture of the rival city: as a sign of gratitude, they were granted an augmentation of the communal coat-of-arms with the Hohenstaufen eagle, together with other privileges. This episode shows how the independent cities used the rivalry between the Empire and the Pope as a means to obtain maximum advantage for themselves.

At this time, Gregory considered yielding. A truce occurred, and peace negotiations began. Direct peace negotiations ultimately failed, and Gregory called for a General Council. Frederick and his allies, however, dashed Gregory's plan for a General Council when they intercepted a delegation of prelates travelling to Rome in a Genoese fleet at the crushing Battle of Giglio (1241), capturing almost all of the high dignitaries and taking thousands of prisoners along with most of the fleet. The emperor proclaimed his victory to be divine judgment and a symbol against the illegality of his persecution by Gregory.

Frederick then directed his army toward Rome and the pope, burning and destroying Umbria as he advanced. Then, just as the Emperor's forces were ready to attack Rome, Gregory died on 22 August 1241. Recognizing that an assault on Rome could prove both unsuccessful and detrimental to broader European perception of his cause, Frederick attempted to show that the war was not directed against the Church of Rome but against the pope by withdrawing his troops and freeing from prison in Capua two cardinals he had captured at Giglio, Otto of Tonengo—whom he had befriended and made into a staunch ally—and James of Pecorara. Frederick then travelled to the Regno to await the election of a new pope. Even so, his supposedly withdrawal from a direct attack on Rome and the Curia proved a cynical ploy.

Based in the south, Frederick proactively interfered in the papal election. During the sede vacante, the imperial armies continued to surround Rome, blocking the arrival of some cardinal electors known to be hostile to the Emperor's interests. Unable to reach a consensus, the cardinals were locked in a monastery called the Septasolium by the Roman civic officials, eventually settling on one of their oldest and most feeble members, Goffredo da Castiglione, in late October 1241.

The new pope, Celestine IV, was more amenable to the Imperial cause. However, the conditions within the monastery seemed to have contributed to his death soon after the election the following November. After Celestine IV's death, the war on the peninsula resumed and the cardinals dispersed for over a year and a half before coming together in Anagni to elect a new pope. The Emperor took advantage of the papal vacancy to press his supremacy across most of Italy, except for some of the hold-out Lombard cities, and refine his newly unified Imperial Italo-Sicilian regime. Frederick was still at the height of his power and his willingness to pointedly prolong the papal election process marked an important milestone. This episode was the first of many protracted sede vacantes of the later Middle Ages and demonstrated how, during the struggle between empire and papacy, the overt polarization of the latter steadily increased—this culminated in the effective subsuming of the papacy to the French monarchy by the 14th century.

=== The Mongol Threat ===
The Holy Roman Empire at the time of the Mongol incursions

In 1241–1242, the forces of the Mongol Empire decisively defeated the armies of Hungary and Poland and devastated their countryside and all their unfortified settlements. King Béla of Hungary appealed to Frederick for aid, but Frederick, being in dispute with the Hungarian king for some time (as Bela had sided with the papacy against him) and not wanting to commit to a major military expedition so readily, refused. He was unwilling to cross into Hungary, and although he went about unifying his magnates and other monarchs to potentially face a Mongol invasion, he specifically took his vow for the defence of the empire on "this side of the Alps".

Frederick was aware of the danger the Mongols posed, and grimly assessed the situation, but also tried to use it as leverage over the papacy to frame himself as the protector of Christendom. While he called them traitorous pagans, Frederick expressed admiration for Mongol military prowess after hearing of their deeds, in particular their able commanders and fierce discipline and obedience, judging the latter to be the greatest source of their success. He called a levy throughout Germany while the Mongols were busy raiding Hungary. In mid-1241, Frederick dispersed his army back to their holdfasts as the Mongols preoccupied themselves with the lands east of the Danube, attempting to smash all Hungarian resistance. He subsequently ordered his vassals to strengthen their defences, adopt a defensive posture, and gather large numbers of crossbowmen.

A chronicler reports that Frederick received a demand of submission from Batu Khan at some time, which he ignored. Frederick II apparently kept himself up to date on the Mongols' activities, as a letter from the emperor dated June 1241 comments that the Mongols were now using looted Hungarian armour. On 20 June in Faenza, the emperor issued the Encyclica contra Tartaros, an encyclical letter announcing the fall of Kiev, the invasion of Hungary and the threat to Germany, and requesting each Christian nation to devote its proper quota of men and arms to the defense of Christendom. According to Matthew of Paris's copy of the encyclical, it was addressed to the Catholic nations—France, Spain, Wales, Ireland, England, Swabia, Denmark, Italy, Burgundy, Apulia, Crete, Cyprus, Sicily, Scotland and Norway—each addressed according to its own national stereotype. Richard of San Germano states that copies were sent to all the princes of the West and quotes the start of the letter to the French king. In the encyclical, Frederick indicated he had accepted Hungarian submission as emperor. (Note: After deposing Frederick as emperor, Pope Innocent IV released Béla IV from his submission on the grounds that Frederick had not fulfilled its terms. However, Bela still seemed to accept Frederick's Imperial preeminence despite the papal deposition.) Another letter written by Frederick, found in the Regesta Imperii, dated 20 June 1241, and intended for all his vassals in Swabia, Austria, and Bohemia, included a number of specific military instructions. His forces were to avoid engaging the Mongols in field battles, hoard all food stocks in every fortress and stronghold, and arm all possible levies as well as the general populace.

Thomas of Split comments that there was a frenzy of fortifying castles and cities throughout the Holy Roman Empire, including Italy. Either following the Emperor's instructions or on their own initiative, Frederick II, Duke of Austria, paid to have his border castles strengthened at his own expense. King Wenceslaus I of Bohemia had every castle strengthened and provisioned, as well as providing soldiers and armaments to monasteries in order to turn them into refuges for the civilian population.

Mongol probing attacks materialised on the Holy Roman Empire's border states: a force was repulsed in a skirmish near Kłodzko, 300–700 Mongol troops were killed in a battle near Vienna to 100 Austrian losses (according to the Duke of Austria), and a Mongol raiding party was destroyed by Austrian knights in the district of Theben after being backed to the border of the River March. As the Holy Roman Empire seemed now the target of the Mongols, Frederick II sent letters to Henry III of England and Louis IX of France in order to organise a crusade against the Mongol Empire. A full-scale invasion never occurred, as the Mongols spent the next year pillaging Hungary before withdrawing. After the Mongols withdrew from Hungary back to Russia, Frederick turned his attention back towards Italian matters. The danger represented by the presence of the Mongols in Europe was debated again at the First Council of Lyon in 1245, but Frederick II was excommunicated by that very diet in the context of his struggle with the papacy and ultimately abandoned the possibility of a crusade against the Mongol Empire.

== War with the Papacy ==
=== Conflict with Innocent IV and the Council of Lyons ===
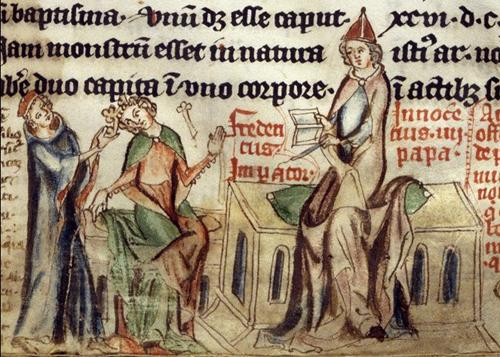
Excommunication of Frederick by Pope Innocent IV

A new pope, Innocent IV, was elected on 25 June 1243. He was a member of a noble family from Genoa with Ghibelline sympathies, and even had some relatives in imperial camp. Innocent, however, was to prove his fiercest enemy. Frederick was initially happy with his election but seems to have privately been more pessimistic about the prospects for a settlement. He was reportedly later to bitterly exclaim, "No pope can be a Ghibelline." Nevertheless, Frederick continued to press forward with his plans for a unified imperial Italian state that stretched across the entire peninsula. Already, in 1240, he had issued an edict which began the process of integrating imperial Italy and his Sicilian kingdom into a more formally bound administrative system. In mid 1243, the emperor held a diet in Siena, a Ghibelline city, which formulated a broad constitutional framework for this unified Italo-Sicilian regime based along the lines of Frederick's efforts in previous years and the Constitutions of Melfi. The work to create a united Italian administrative system would continue steadily over the next years, even in the face of the setbacks which were to come.

Negotiations for a settlement with Innocent IV began in the summer of 1243, but relations quickly deteriorated when Viterbo rebelled, instigated by the intriguing anti-imperial local cardinal, Ranieri of Viterbo. Frederick could not afford to lose his main stronghold near Rome, so he besieged Viterbo. Innocent IV convinced the rebels to sign a peace and Frederick agreed to withdraw his garrison. But, as they withdrew, Ranieri incited the rebel forces of the city, and the imperial garrison was slaughtered on 13 November. Frederick was enraged but still signed a peace treaty, which was soon broken. The new pope now showed himself to be adamantly opposed to Frederick. Together with many of the Cardinals, most of whom were newly appointed by himself, Innocent fled via Genoese galleys to Liguria, arriving on 7 December 1244. His aim was to reach Lyon, where a he had called a new church council had for later the next year.

The council was under-attended and despite initially appearing that it could end with a compromise, the intervention of Ranieri, who had a series of scurrilous pamphlets published against Frederick (in which, among other things, he defined the emperor as a heretic and an Antichrist), led the prelates towards a less accommodating solution. Frederick seemed inclined to go to Lyon and argue his case in person but, because of the emperor's charismatic reputation, power and influence, Innocent would not allow this for fear of Frederick swaying the council. One month later, before Frederick's representatives even reached Lyon, Innocent IV declared Frederick to be deposed as emperor, characterizing him as a "friend of Babylon's sultan", "of Saracen customs", "provided with a harem guarded by eunuchs", like the schismatic emperor of the Eastern Roman Empire, and in sum a "heretic". The illegitimate "deposition" of the emperor provoked consternation from other European monarchs and, weary of the interference of an overweening pope, none offered any meaningful support to Innocent. Louis IX, sympathetic to the emperor, refused Innocent's requests to enter France and Henry III of England, pushed by English discontent with increased church fundraising to finance a papal war with Frederick, rebuffed Innocent's entreaties to move to Gascony. Even within some of the clergy in France, Germany, England, and Italy itself, unrest with Frederick's "deposition" and the preaching of a crusade against the emperor grew. Nevertheless, Innocent IV had made the struggle between pope and emperor an all-or-nothing one, which would doom first the power of the Empire (after Frederick's death) then, eventually, the power of the papacy as well. The papacy raised its intractable standard.

Frederick met the challenge with all the means of public persuasion at his disposal and he seems to have had a relatively efficient "propaganda machine" that addressed encyclicals to his fellow monarchs and rebutted each of the papal denunciations in detail while his representatives argued the imperial case in person across the courts of Europe. The emperor had already summoned an imperial diet in Verona in the early spring of 1245 which, despite his excommunication at the time, was well-attended, where he issued an imperial bull which affirmed a broad condemnation of Innocent's prejudicial deposition by the princes of the empire. This, along with Frederick's efforts to persuade other European monarchs of Innocent's mendacity and duplicity, seems to have had some effect on the meagre attendance of the Council of Lyons. However now that the struggle with the papacy was joined without hope of reconciliation, Frederick himself became, more than any other figure since late antiquity, the singular "personal imperative" of the empire and Romanity itself. Hardened by the struggle, everything in his rulership was now intrinsically bound to him. The strain of the coming years would show him at his most despotic, absolutist and ruthless. In retaliation to the partisan deposition at Lyon, Frederick purged the clergy in Sicily and Italy of Innocent's supporters wherever he found them. Across Italy, he waged a campaign of terror to target any hint of opposition, papal-backed or otherwise. His reprisals were brutal and Frederick was supposed to have declared, "I have been the anvil long enough… now I shall be the hammer."

=== Conspiracy, crisis and setbacks ===
In 1246, Innocent allegedly set in motion a plot to kill Frederick and Enzo with the support of the pope's brother-in-law Orlando de Rossi, a friend of the emperor. The assassination of Frederick would be the signal for a general uprising against Imperial rule across Italy. However, while the emperor was staying in Grosseto, the plotters were unmasked by Riccardo Sanseverino, Count of Caserta, after one of their number, Giovanni da Presenzano, betrayed them. The chief conspirators were some of the emperor's closest friends and officials. Frederick dealt ruthlessly with the plot. His lieutenants hunted down the conspirators, destroying their strongholds of Cilento, Sala Consilina, and Altavilla where they had found refuge. The last of the conspirators held out against Frederick's forces in the castle of Capaccio for most of the summer of 1246 but were forced to surrender for lack of water. Hundreds of the conspirators were captured. They were blinded, mutilated, and burnt alive or hanged, and their families were imprisoned or sold into slavery. Much of the holdings of Sanseverino family along with those of other conspirators were seized by the crown. The conspiracy had been utterly crushed, and the Sicilian crown had enlarged its already sizable domain. An attempt to invade the Kingdom of Sicily under the command of Cardinal Ranieri was halted at Spello by Marino of Eboli, Imperial Vicar of Spoleto. For his fidelity in unmasking the plot, Frederick betrothed his illegitimate daughter Violante (leg. 1248) to Riccardo Sanseverino.

Despite the papal-backed conspiracy against his life, Frederick was now an even more powerful autocrat in the Regno, and his grip on central Italy and much of Lombardy remained strong. However, the conspiracy was a personal blow to the emperor, leaving him deeply suspicious of his subordinates, and he increasingly relied on his sons. Enzo was already his father's chief representative in Lombardy while Frederick of Antioch was appointed Imperial Vicar of Tuscany.

Innocent also sent a flow of money to Germany to dislodge Frederick's power there. The archbishops of Cologne and Mainz declared Frederick deposed, and in May 1246, Henry Raspe, Landgrave of Thuringia, was chosen as papal-backed anti-king. On 5 August 1246, Henry Raspe, thanks to the pope's money, managed to defeat an army of Conrad, son of Frederick, in the Battle of Frankfurt. Frederick strengthened his position in Southern Germany, however, acquiring the Duchy of Austria, whose duke had died without heirs, along with the sizable treasury of the now bereft House of Babenberg. A year later, Henry Raspe died, and Innocent selected William II of Holland as the new pro-papal anti-king, but support for the latter remained minimal and generally ineffective in Germany until the emperor's death.

Between February and March 1247, Frederick settled the situation in Italy at a diet in Terni, naming his relatives or friends as vicars of the various lands, including one of his illegitimate sons, Richard of Chieti, as Imperial Vicar of Spoleto. He married his son Manfred to the daughter of Amedeo di Savoia to secure the Alpine passes to Lyon and compelled the submission of the marquis of Monferrato. A papal army under the command of Ottaviano degli Ubaldini never reached Lombardy, and the emperor, accompanied by a massive army, held another diet at Turin. Innocent once again asked for protection from the King of France, Louis IX, but the king consistently refused, hoping instead to broker a peace which left Frederick free to support crusading plans in the Levant. However, Louis also warned that he would not accept any direct attack by Frederick against Innocent in Lyon. Despite this, Lyon was technically an Imperial city and Frederick stood poised to lead an expedition across the Alps to confront Innocent directly.

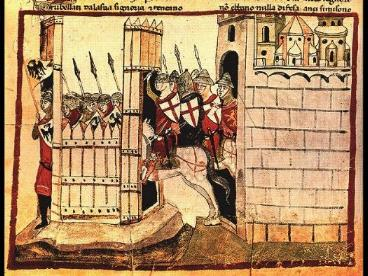
The wooden city of Vittoria is charged at the siege of Parma 1248

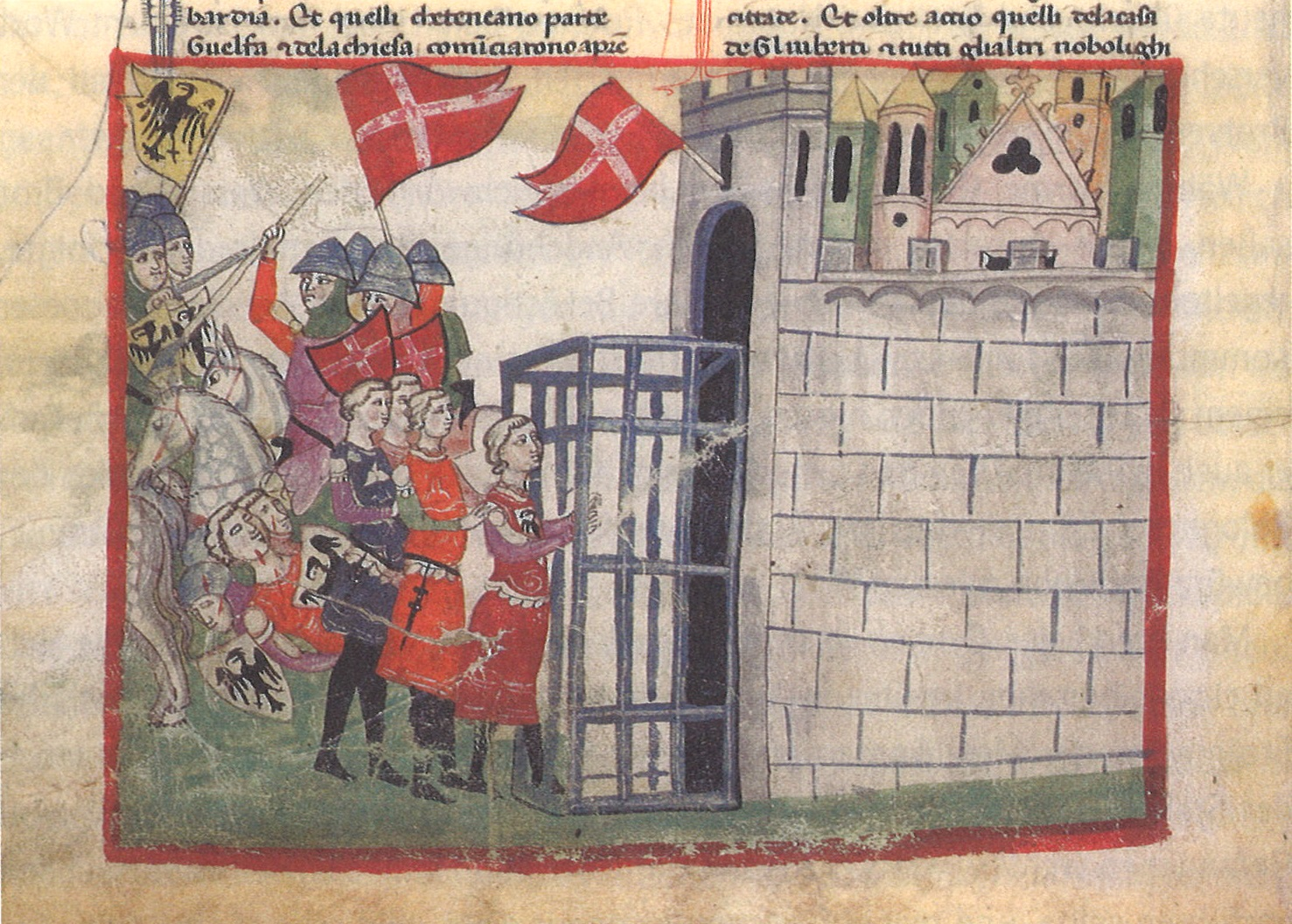
The capture of King Enzo, a son of Frederick, at the Battle of Fossalta 1249

An unexpected event was to change the situation dramatically. In June 1247, the important Lombard city of Parma expelled the Imperial functionaries and sided with the Guelphs. Enzo was not in the city and could do nothing more than ask for help from his father, who came back to lay siege to the rebels, together with his friend Ezzelino III da Romano, tyrant of Verona. The besieged languished as the emperor waited for them to surrender from starvation. He had a wooden city, which he called "Vittoria", built around the walls.

On 18 February 1248, while Frederick was hunting, the camp was suddenly assaulted and taken, and in the ensuing Battle of Parma, the imperial side was routed. Taddeo da Suessa, Great Justiciar of Sicily and an important imperial-royal advisor, was killed in the battle. Frederick also lost the imperial treasure and with it his offensive momentum against the rebellious communes in the immediate future, forcing him to forgo any assault against Lyon again—at least for the rest of the year. Sensing this, Innocent began plans for a crusade against Sicily.

=== Nadir and Personal Loss ===
Frederick soon recovered and rebuilt his army, but the defeat outside Parma encouraged resistance in many cities that could no longer bear the fiscal burden of his regime: parts of the Romagna, Marche and Spoleto were lost for a time. In May 1248, Frederick's illegitimate son Richard of Chieti defeated a papal army led by Hugo Novellus, a papal partisan, near Civitanova Marche and recaptured some areas of the Marche and Spoleto. Basing himself in Piedmont in June, Frederick hosted many nobles of northern Italy and ambassadors from foreign kings in his court, and energetically set about rebuilding Imperial authority in Lombardy. The scope of his activity demonstrated that neither his deposition nor the defeat at Parma, it seems, had diminished his fame or preeminence. Frederick's relatively rapid recovery showed that the defeat at Parma was far from decisive, and the war in Lombardy remained fundamentally spasmodic and localized. Nevertheless, it was only by strenuous, even unrelenting effort that Frederick was able to stabilize the situation by the close of 1248 and replenish his coffers, raising some 130,000 gold ounces.

Frederick remained confident, but after several years of war, he was increasingly suspicious and wearied. Bianca Lancia, Frederick's mistress, seems to have died at some point during 1248. Frederick had reportedly married her in 1246 but he seems to have agreed to legitimize his children by her, both at her request and, probably, to legitimize Manfred, adding him to his possible male successors.

In February 1249, Frederick dismissed his advisor and chief minister, the famous jurist and poet Pier delle Vigne, on charges of peculation and embezzlement. Some historians suggest that Pier was planning to betray the emperor, who, according to Matthew of Paris, cried when he discovered the plot. Pier, blinded and in chains, died in Pisa, possibly by his own hand.

Even more shocking for Frederick was the defeat and capture of Enzo by the Bolognese at the Battle of Fossalta in May 1249. Earlier in the spring, the emperor gathered a large army hoping to finally subdue the last few holdouts of Lombard resistance and move against Innocent at Lyon. Frederick planned a pincer movement, with Enzo taking a portion of the army to defeat the Bolognese while the main force continued northward into central Lombardy. Even as the main army under the emperor subdued large swathes of Emilia-Romagna and much of central Lombardy remained Imperial, the campaign was halted by Enzo's defeat at Fossalta. Enzo was held in a palace in Bologna where he remained captive until his death in 1272. Richard of Chieti was also killed in 1249, likely in the same battle. However, though the battle did not noticeably alter the political situation, and the emperor still remained relatively dominant, the capture of Enzo and the death of the Richard of Chieti, both whom had proved able lieutenants, were significant personal setbacks for Frederick. He named Manfred as Legate General of Italy to replace the now captive Enzo. The Bolognese refused all attempts by the emperor to ransom his son and Bologna, along with Milan, remained one of the staunchest Guelph cities in northern Italy.

All in all, the year 1249 was the lowest point of the emperor's fortunes and made clear how reliant the Imperial position was on his person. Wearied but characteristically defiant, Frederick left a portion his army in central Lombardy under the command of his captains and returned to the south where he would remain until his death.

== Recovery and Death ==
=== Imperial Resurgence ===
The struggle against the papacy and its allies in Italy and Germany continued. Como was lost and Modena was temporarily overtaken by a Guelph faction. Yet, even from late 1249 into early 1250, the situation progressively favoured Frederick. Early in the year, an army sent to invade the Kingdom of Sicily under the command of Cardinal Pietro Capocci was crushed in the Marche at the Battle of Cingoli by Frederick's lieutenant Walter of Palearia, Count of Manopello and Imperial condottieri again reconquered the almost all of the Romagna, the Marche and Spoleto. Later in May, the indomitable Ranieri of Viterbo died, depriving pro-papal leadership in Italy of an implacable foe of the emperor. The Ghibelline Manfredi family held Faenza, and the Counts of Bagnacavallo recovered Ravenna for the Imperial cause. Viterbo had been retaken since its previous defection and much of Umbria, the Marche of Ancona and Romagna seemed more secure. In Germany, Conrad scored several victories against William of Holland and forced the pro-papal Rhenish archbishops to sign a truce.

Innocent IV was increasingly isolated as support for the papal cause dwindled rapidly in Germany, Italy, and across Europe generally. Frederick of Antioch, as Imperial Vicar of Tuscany and podestà of Florence, had relatively stabilized the region by heavy-handed but effective means—although the loyalty of the Tuscan Ghibellines was pragmatic and Florence's allegiance remained fluid, as shown by the ousting Frederick of Antioch by the city's Guelph faction shortly before the emperor's death later in the year. Piacenza changed allegiances to the emperor and Oberto Pallavicino, Imperial Vicar of Lombardy, defeated Parma, expelled its Guelph faction, and recaptured a swathe of central Lombardy. Ezzelino da Romano held Verona, Vicenza, Padua and the Trevisan March along with most of eastern Lombardy, and seized Belluno and Este. Of the Lombard League's cities, only Milan, Brescia, and Bologna held out.

Several cities, such as Modena, that had shifted sides in the previous year, were ripe for recapture by Ghibelline partisans and many changed allegiances again. Genoa was threatened by Frederick's allies after a defeat at sea by Imperial forces near Savona, and Venice's support for Innocent and the League waned. The offensive forces of the League had never truly recovered from the defeat at Cortenuova in 1237, and resistance was more confined to its major cities, such as Milan and Bologna. However, the emperor's rapid success during the year compelled even the Bolognese, in begrudging discouragement, to sue for peace. It appeared that all over Italy, the links of the Imperial chain were restored and tightening. Major defections stopped and the papacy had been shown incapable of sustaining the war against the emperor in Italy.

Even with Imperial prospects brightening, however, large areas of Italy had been ravaged by years of war, and the League's defensive works made assaulting its key cities difficult. Yet, encouraging as the imperial rebound across Italy was, in many ways the war against the most powerful of Lombard cities, particularly Milan and Bologna—however isolated they had become, remained a stalemate. The imperial recovery came with considerable continued costs, too. The demands of war had forced the emperor to levy increasingly higher taxation over the past few years and even the resources of the wealthy and prosperous Regno were strained. Frederick's newly unified regime in Italy and Sicily was despotic and extractive, imposing harsh taxes and ruthlessly suppressing dissent wherever it could. Nevertheless, that his administrative system consistently recovered in the face of the setbacks of the previous few years remains an impressive feat and a testament to his skillful statecraft.

Frederick did not participate in any of the campaigns of 1250 in person apart from general strategic command. He had been ill, withdrawing to the Kingdom of Sicily, where he remained for much of the year. Suddenly, on 13 December 1250, after a persistent attack of dysentery, Frederick died in Castel Fiorentino (territory of Torremaggiore) in Apulia. Despite the betrayals, setbacks, and flux of fortune he had faced in his last years, Frederick died peacefully, reportedly wearing the habit of a Cistercian monk. Of his father's death, Manfred wrote to Conrad in Germany, "The sun of justice has set, the maker of peace has passed away."

At the time of Frederick's death, his preeminent position in Europe was challenged but not lost since it was not the emperor's fortunes which were waning, but his enemies'. No monarch in Europe had accepted his deposition nor provided any meaningful support for Innocent IV. The emperor's prestige, even after the setbacks of the previous two years, remained relatively undimmed. Beside this, Frederick's power in the Regno remained solid. His hold over most of Italy and Germany was still strong. The political situation remained fluid and the victories of 1250 had put Frederick in the ascendant again.

Everywhere, Innocent's fortunes seemed dire: the papal treasury was depleted, and his anti-king William of Holland had been routed by Conrad in Germany, though Hohenstaufen support and its power base in southern Germany disintegrated after Frederick's death and the demise of his heirs. In Italy, Frederick's lieutenants and partisans had recaptured much of the territories lost in the last two years; he was in a strong position, and he prepared to march on Lyon in the new year. Despite the economic strains placed on the Regno, support from the Emperor of Nicaea, John III Doukas Vatatzes, enabled Frederick to refill his coffers and resupply his forces. Only his death halted this momentum.

His testament left Conrad the Imperial and Sicilian crowns, as well as 100,000 gold ounces to be used at Conrad's discretion for the maintenance of the Holy Land. Manfred received the principality of Taranto, 10,000 gold ounces, and regency over Sicily and Italy with full Imperial authority while his half-brother remained in Germany. Henry Charles Otto, Frederick's son by Isabella of England, received 10,000 gold ounces and the Kingdom of Arles or that of Jerusalem, while the emperor's namesake grandson, Frederick—the son of Henry VII—was entrusted with the Duchy of Austria and the March of Styria. Perhaps aiming to lay stones for a potential peace settlement between Conrad and Innocent—or a final scheme to further demonstrate papal prejudice against him, Frederick's will stipulated that all the lands he had taken from the Church were to be returned to it, all the prisoners freed except those guilty of high treason, and the taxes reduced, provided this did not damage the Empire's prestige. At his death, the Hohenstaufen empire remained the leading power in Europe and its security seemed assured in the persons of his sons.

Frederick's sarcophagus (made of red porphyry) lies in the cathedral of Palermo beside those of his parents (Henry VI and Constance) as well as his grandfather, the Norman king Roger II of Sicily. He was found wearing a funerary alb with a Thuluth-style inscribed cuff when his sarcophagus was opened in the nineteenth century and various items can be found in the British Museum's collection, including a small piece of funerary crown.

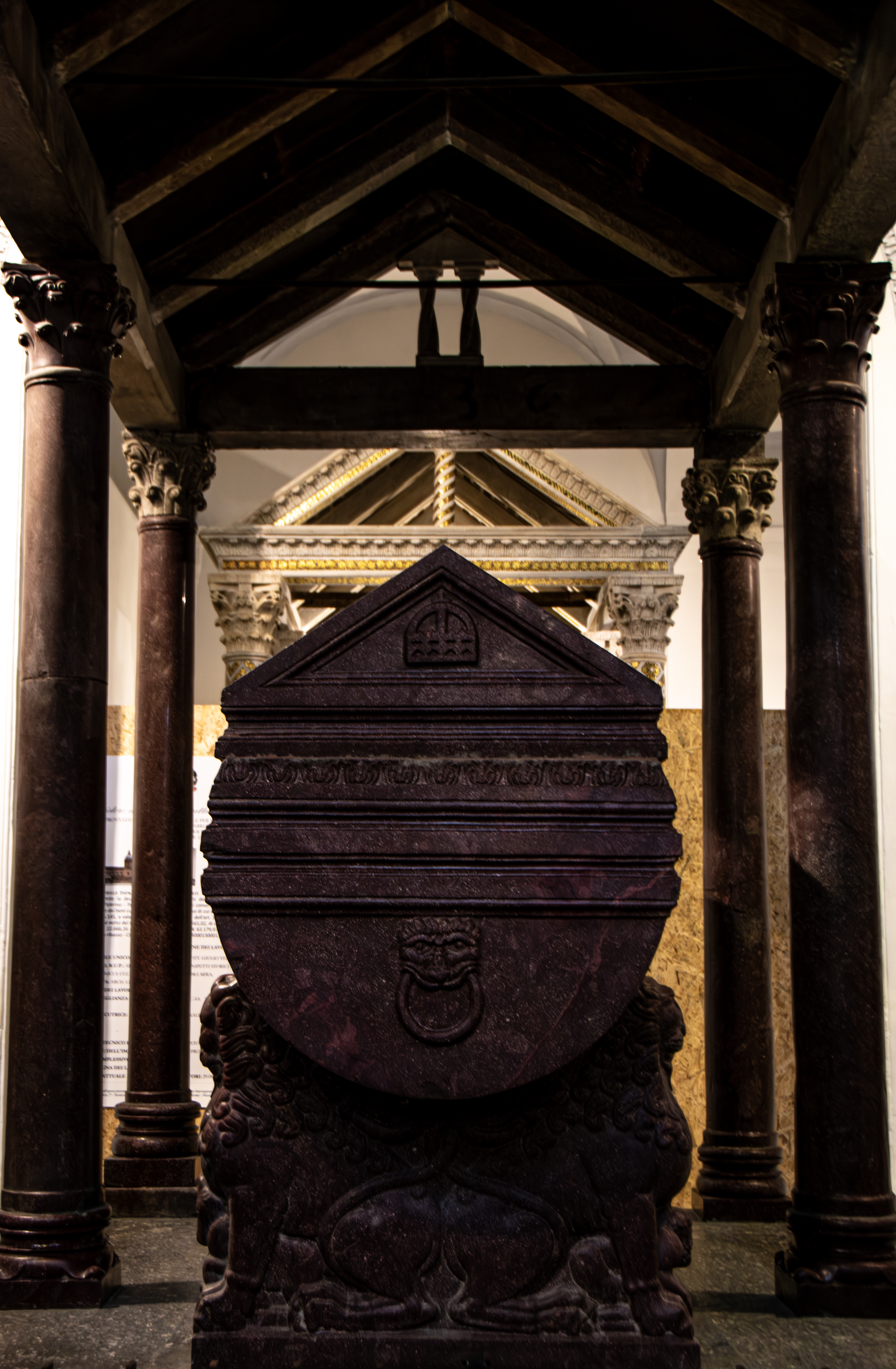
Tomb of Frederick II inside the Cathedral of Palermo

=== Demise of the Hohenstaufen ===
When he died, Frederick II still retained his fundamental dominance, even though his conflict with the papacy and its allies in Italy and Germany was unresolved. The remarkable recovery of imperial fortunes across the board in 1250 seems to have confirmed his apparent personal supremacy. Indeed, the shock of his sudden death signified, perhaps, a contemporary sense that he bestrode the era like a colossus in the "full glory" of imperial power. Yet, for all the grandeur of his reign, his "herculean" efforts to bind together first Sicily, then Italy and Germany, in closer imperial unity proved futile with the eventual collapse of his dynasty. Frederick had attempted the impossible and achieved the improbable. Considering the highly complex, many-faceted level he had operated, and for so long against such intensity, his achievements were weighty. The extent of what he accomplished, despite the ultimate failure of his dynasty and the Hohenstaufen empire, showed his extraordinary ability and tenacity, and perhaps marks his individuality among all medieval rulers. But, it was tenuous legacy that in large measure crumbled over the coming years.

Frederick's status proved an impossible inheritance for his heirs, especially with the papacy bent on the annihilation of the entire Hohenstaufen dynasty. Still, in light of the imperial gains during the emperor's final year, it seemed like Conrad would be able to take up his father's mantle and succeed to the imperial throne once he had secured the Kingdom of Sicily. Similar to his father's earlier calculus, Conrad judged that it would be better to solidify his grip on the Regno first and left Germany in 1252 to press his authority in southern Italy. However practical this decision was, it left the Hohenstaufen domain north of the Alps vulnerable. By 1254, Conrad had successfully consolidated his power in the kingdom and looked poised to finally defeat Innocent IV, who had returned to Rome and continued to foment anti-Hohenstaufen rebellions in Italy. Conrad, however, died suddenly of malaria, and the Hohenstaufen dynasty fell from power in Germany, inaugurating the Great Interregnum which lasted until 1273 with the accession of Rudolf of Habsburg to the German crown. Innocent also died soon after in 1254. His successor Pope Alexander IV opposed the Hohenstaufen, but proved a far less capable politician than Innocent IV, and Manfred moved to assert his authority in the kingdom.

At first Manfred acted as regent of the Regno for Conrad's son in Germany, the young Conradin, but eventually succeeded to the Sicilian throne in 1258. Despite the continued hostility of the papacy and his excommunication by Popes Alexander IV and Clement IV, Manfred enjoyed some notable success in Italy over the next few years. Of all Frederick II's children, save perhaps Enzo, Manfred seems to have been the most personally similar to his father, and showed both nous and intelligence. He also shared Frederick's cultural and intellectual tastes, and his court enjoyed a measure of his father's magnificence. He proved himself an able and ambitious ruler, who maintained a still powerful kingdom and projected his influence northward into the rest of Italy and east into Greece. After the great Ghibelline victory at the Battle of Montaperti in 1260, Manfred managed to achieve hegemony over much of the peninsula. It even seemed that he could reach for his father's status. However, when the papal-backed forces under Charles of Anjou invaded Italy in 1266, much of Manfred's influence in Italy evaporated. His subsequent death at the Battle of Benevento inaugurated Angevin dominance in southern Italy for generations. Conradin made an attempt to reclaim Sicily after Manfred's death but was defeated and captured at the Battle of Tagliacozzo in 1268 and executed by Charles I of Anjou soon after. With the execution of Conradin and the death of Enzo in prison in 1273, the main Hohenstaufen line finally ended, after more than a century as perhaps the axis of European politics.

Over the next two decades under the Angevins, the great kingdom of Roger II and Frederick II was broken by the War of the Sicilian Vespers, which split the mainland territories from the island of Sicily. Moreover, with the total extinction of Hohenstaufen power in Italy and Germany, the Capetian kings of France, particularly the autocratic Philip IV, began to assert their own hegemonic supremacy as the preeminent monarchs in Latin Christendom. The cohabitation of the papacy with the French crown—as the direct result the anti-Hohenstaufen conflict—progressively caused friction. This came to a head when Philip IV clashed with Pope Boniface VIII over ideological supremacy. After decades of overt power-playing and aggressive political interventionism, the credibility of the papacy was reduced. Similar to Frederick II against Innocent IV, Philip used anti-papal propaganda to assault the pope and shore up his own more proactive national French monarchy. Less like Frederick though, Philip IV's propaganda campaign was more potent since it drew on a much larger pool of resentment for the overweening papacy over the past decades. Philip ruthlessly defeated Boniface and installed a pro-Capetian pope, Clement V. Philip also removed his puppet-pope from Rome to Avignon, effectively welding the papacy itself to the French crown for several decades to come—a period known as the Avignon Papacy. By the 14th century, both the Holy Roman Empire and the imperial papacy which had so bitterly opposed the Hohenstaufen, lay fractured in the wreckage of medieval Roman universalism.

== Personality and religion ==
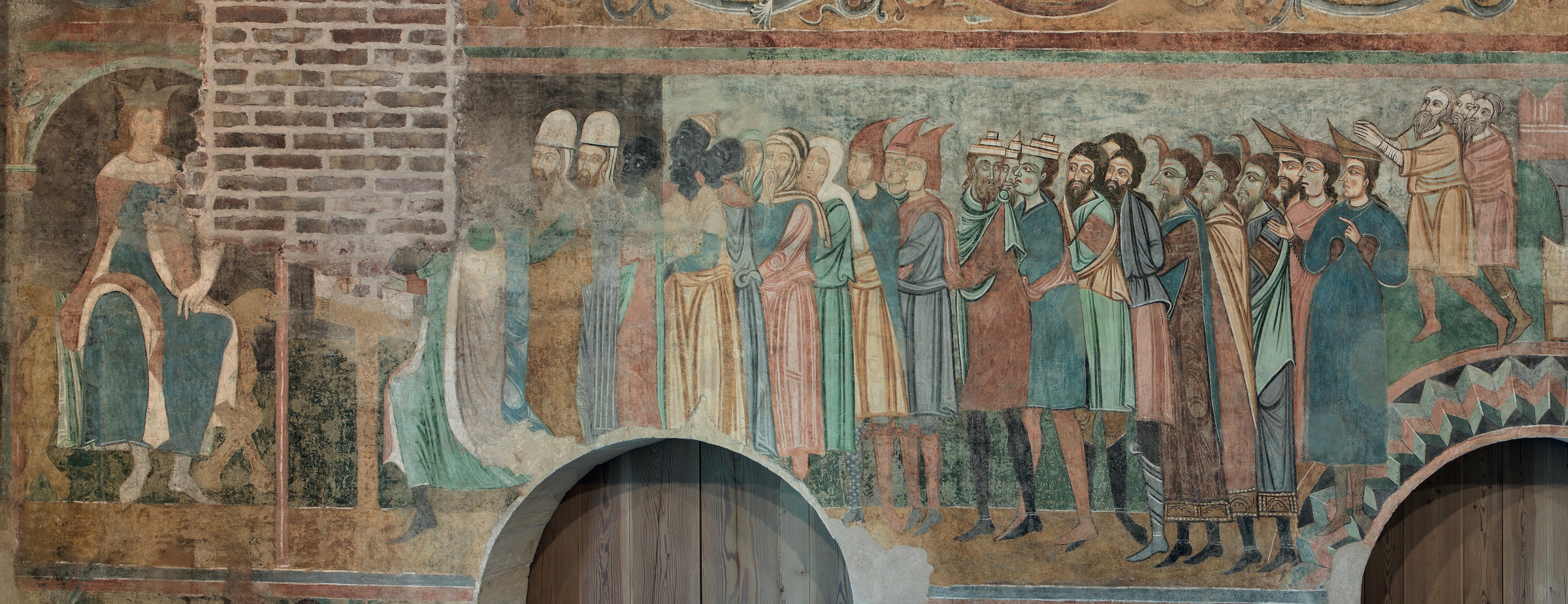
Contemporary fresco depicting Frederick seated on the left as a universal ruler; the "Stupor Mundi" receiving homage from the peoples of the world. Torre di San Zeno, Verona, 13th century

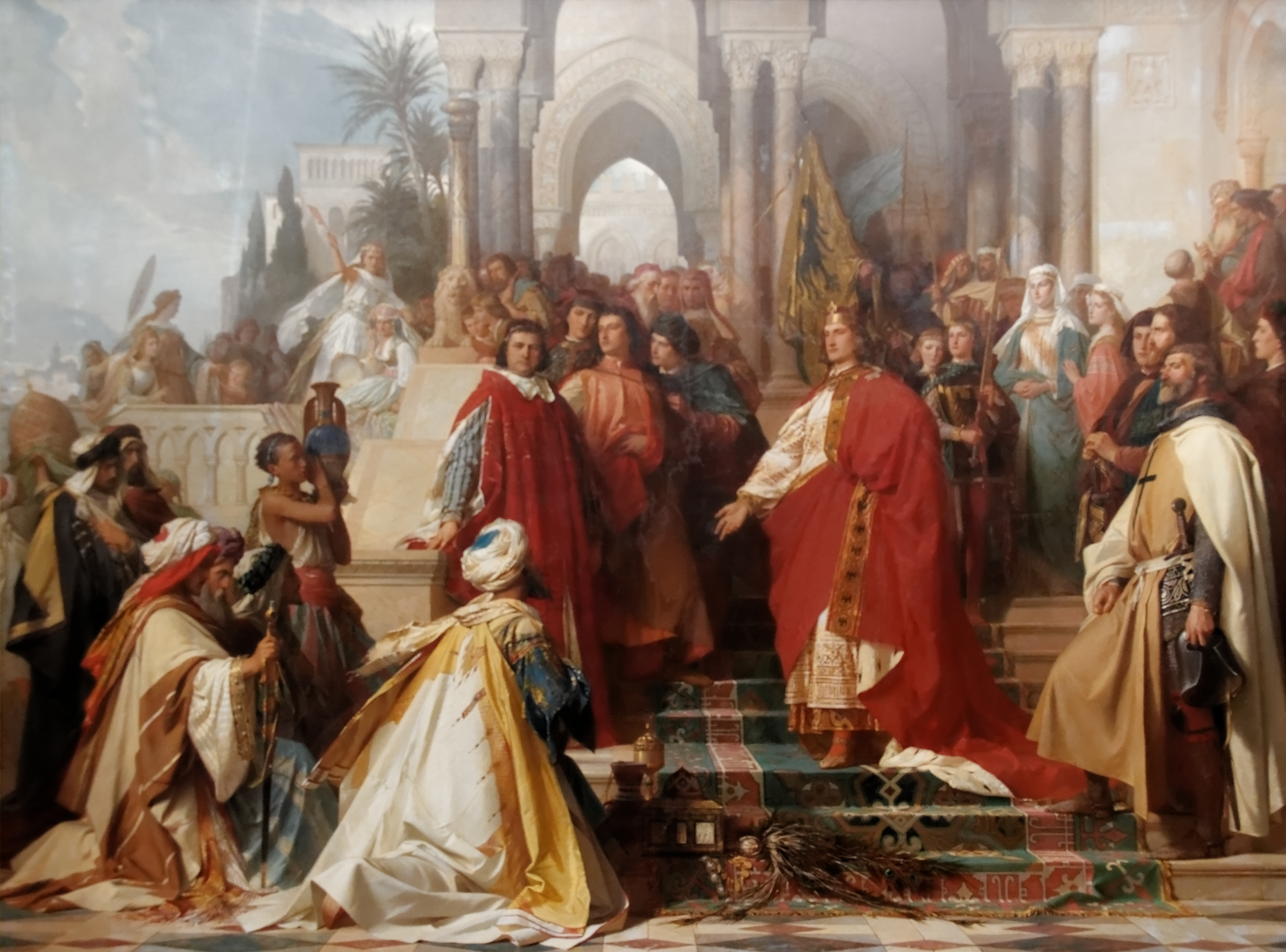
The Court of Emperor Frederick II in Palermo by Arthur von Ramberg

Frederick's contemporaries called him Stupor Mundi, the "Astonishment" or the "Wonder of the World", and Immutator Mirabilis or the "Marvelous Transformer [of the World]" for his charismatic personality and political ambitions. This carried with it a tinge of messianism from some of Frederick's supporters and a sense of the demonic from his opponents. Many of his contemporaries were astonished, even transfixed by his audacity, stubbornness, and extraordinary ambitions. However, they were also sometimes terrified by the pronounced unorthodoxy of the Hohenstaufen emperor, and pointed to his cruelty and despotism. Even so, the famous English chronicler Matthew of Paris still acclaimed Frederick as the "greatest of the princes of the earth."

Frederick II's multifaceted personality remains securely attached to his legacy. Even from a young age, he showed precocity and knowledge beyond his years, deeply conscious of his imperial lineage and defiant of any constraint on his free will. He seemed to be insatiably curious about everything – science, naturalism, mathematics, architecture, and poetry – and welcomed many of the most learned figures of his time to his court. He was a conversationalist with an "inexhaustible streak", equal to Voltaire or Oscar Wilde, and a keen polymath, comparable to Leonardo da Vinci, who "wanted to know everything". He enjoyed lively intellectual debates, and though he could be amiable, even enchanting, he was often passionate and intense. The emperor is considered to have been a highly energetic and proactive ruler, ceaselessly traveling around Italy and the Regno, with a zeal for governing perhaps unmatched in the whole of the Middle Ages. His "speciality" was being a despot and a "dirigiste technocrat" who aimed to command every aspect of his Italian realms. Frederick's statecraft, though inventive or perhaps even ingenious, indicates an intolerantly absolutist disposition. If the emperor allowed himself personal heterodoxy, he nevertheless enforced strict orthodoxy everywhere else he could. As the preeminent Christian monarch and Roman emperor, Frederick saw himself as the supreme temporal source of peace, order, and justice, for whom the interests of the state superseded everything.

For all his undeniable charisma and genius, Frederick was at heart a mercurial intellectual who lacked the "common touch" of his grandfather, Frederick Barbarossa, and seemed inclined to more "Oriental attractions." From a childhood of constant emotional insecurity and inhibited relationships, what emerged was a personality that was singularly impressive to contemporaries. Frederick II preferred a select company of intimates with whom he could share his seemingly endless intellectual interests and upon whom he could impress his dominating and protean personality. Frederick seemed to revel in his uncomfortable taste for shocking the conventional. Fundamentally, he possessed a character of inward discord whose stark paradoxes were more pronounced, perhaps, because of his preeminent status and the scope of his personality. He was industrious, farsighted and shrewd, but he could also be megalomaniacal, turbulent, impulsive and utterly ruthless; in Frederick, roguish playfulness and gaiety was paired with cruelty, harshness with magnanimity, rigid idealism and megalomania with an acute sense of political reality, tolerance with intolerance, and sardonic religious indifference with episodes of outward piety. Frederick was cerebral and tended towards a life of isolation and, despite his reputed great charm and acerbic humor—he could not resist a jibing joke or a sly witticism, he seemed unable to break through the barrier separating him from others. Because of the "isolated splendour" of his position as emperor and the innate suspicion implanted in him by his early years, instead of the more "normal pursuits" of men of his age, Frederick found respite from the cares of state in the study of science and mathematics, in philosophy and dialectic, in the violent exercise of the chase, and in an "unrestrained abandonment" to sensual pleasures.

Frederick was apparently gracious to each of his wives but he seems to have only had passionate romantic affection for Bianca Lancia. The emperor's wives likely lived in secluded environments per the semi-oriental customs of Sicilian royalty. He clearly had an amorous side and a voracious sexual appetite, siring a dozen or more illegitimate children alongside nearly ten legitimate children. Unlike some other contemporary monarchs though, Frederick always openly acknowledged his many illegitimate offspring and he seems to have been fond of most of his children, particularly Enzo and Manfred.

Whether because of his audacity, towering status or intellectual brilliance and the breadth of his personality, Frederick's contemporaries—supporters and enemies alike—seem to have found him an incredible enigma. Salimbene di Adam, generally a critic of the emperor, wrote that Frederick was alternatively witty, consoling, and delightful, but also cunning, greedy, and malicious, lacking any religious faith.

William Harvey Maehl argues that Frederick inherited German, Norman, and Sicilian blood, but by training, lifestyle, and temperament, he was "most of all Sicilian" on his cultural tastes and persuasions. Maehl, continues that for his whole life the emperor remained above all a Sicilian grand signore, and, in many ways, his whole imperial policy aimed at expanding the Sicilian kingdom and its administrative mechanisms into Italy rather than projecting southward from Germany proper. According to Norman Cantor, "Frederick had no intention of giving up Naples and Sicily, which were the real strongholds of its power. He was, in fact, uninterested in Germany." Cantor's view notwithstanding, historians generally agree that Frederick was a gifted and subtle politician who instinctively understood the need to balance his overarching Imperial status with the realities of his power-base in the Regno. If, as Maehl contends, the emperor prioritized expanding his Sicilian kingdom northward, even in the face of the opposition of Frederick's enemies, that strategy did, in some ways, prove more viable for securing wider Hohenstaufen hegemony than the earlier and later attempts by German emperors to extended imperial power south across the Alps.

Frederick was a religious sceptic to an extent unusual for his era. His papal enemies used this against him at every turn and accused him of claiming that Moses, Jesus, and Muhammad were the three greatest deceivers who ever lived in a long-rumoured book called the Treatise of the Three Impostors. The actual existence of this book is doubtful (and Frederick himself denied all knowledge of it), but its supposed sentiment seemed to align with Frederick's perceived religious skepticism and indifference to personal faith. Innocent IV declared him preambulus Antichristi (predecessor of the Antichrist) on 17 July 1245. As Frederick allegedly did not respect the privilegium potestatis of the Church, he was excommunicated. His rationalistic mind took pleasure in the strictly logical character of Christian dogma. For all that his naturalist and intellectual pursuits may have pointed towards empiricism, the emperor was not a champion of rationalism, nor had he any sympathy with the mystico-heretical movements of the time; in fact, he viewed them as dissidents against the state and he joined in suppressing them. It was not the Roman Church of the Middle Ages that he antagonized, but its representatives. This notwithstanding, Frederick seemed to be personally ambivalent to religion. Once, when riding through a field of grain, Frederick is reported to have mocked the Christian doctrine of transubstantiation, remarking to his companions, "How many Gods will be made from this corn in my lifetime? How long will this deception last?" The question of Frederick's personal attitude to religion, whether he was a conventional Christian or privately more deistic, perhaps even atheistic, remains a persistent topic of debate.

== Literature and science ==
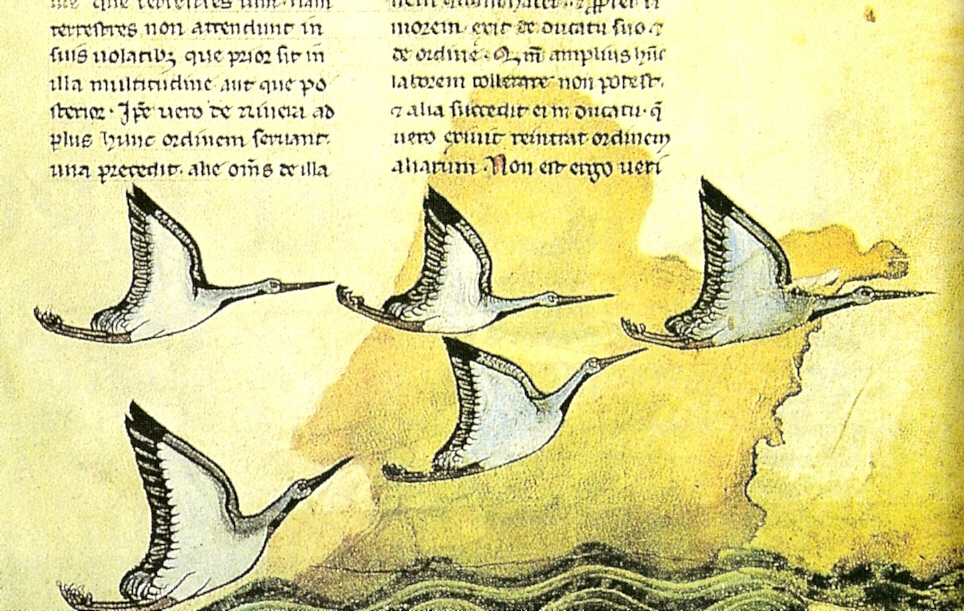
An image from an old copy of De arte venandi cum avibus

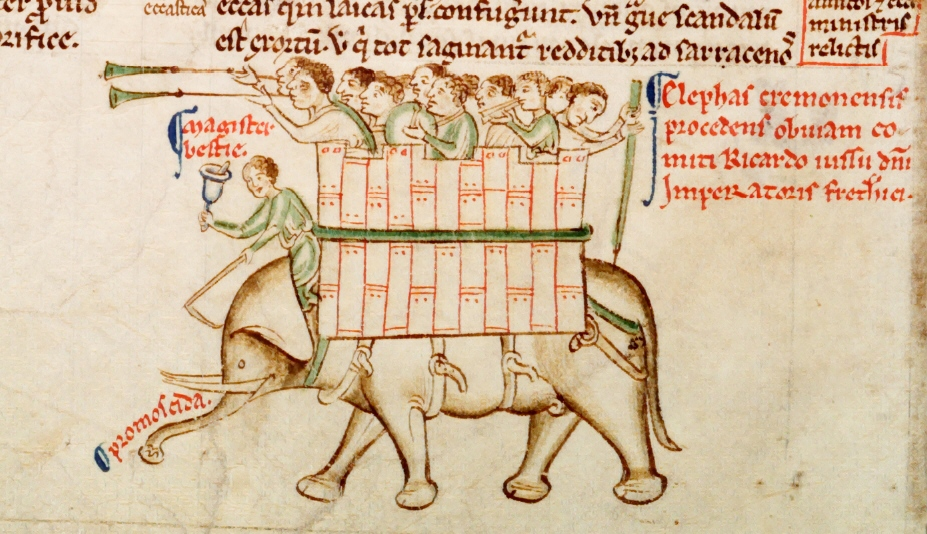
The Cremona elephant as depicted in the Chronica maiora, Part II, Parker Library, MS 16, fol. 151v – On parade during the visit of Frederick's brother-in-law Richard of Cornwall to Cremona in 1241

Frederick had a great thirst for knowledge and learning. Frederick employed Jews from Sicily, who had migrated there from the Holy Land, to translate Greek and Arabic works. He also introduced paper into a European court.

He played a major role in promoting literature through the Sicilian School of poetry. His Sicilian royal court in Palermo saw the first use of a literary form of an Italo-Romance language, Sicilian. Through the mix of Arabic, Hebrew, Latin, Greek, and Sicilian language poems and art at the court, Arabic "muwashshahat" or "girdle poems" influenced the birth of the sonnet. The language developed by Giacomo da Lentini and Pier delle Vigne in the Sicilian School of Poetry gathering around Frederick II in the first half of the thirteenth century had a decisive influence on Dante Alighieri and then on the development of Italian language itself. Dante even regarded Frederick as the father of Italian poetry. The school and its poetry were saluted by Dante and his peers and predate by at least a century the use of the Tuscan idiom as the elite literary language of Italy.

Frederick II is the author of the first treatise on the subject of falconry, De Arte Venandi cum Avibus ("The Art of Hunting with Birds"). In the words of the historian Charles Homer Haskins:

It is a scientific book, approaching the subject from Aristotle but based closely on observation and experiment throughout, Divisivus et Inquisitivus, in the words of the preface; it is at the same time a scholastic book, minute and almost mechanical in its divisions and subdivisions. It is also a rigidly practical book, written by a falconer for falconers and condensing a long experience into systematic form for the use of others.

For this book, he drew from sources in the Arabic language. Frederick's pride in his mastery of the art is illustrated by the story that, when he was ordered to become a subject of the Great Khan (Batu) and receive an office at the Khan's court, he remarked that he would make a good falconer, for he understood birds very well. He maintained up to fifty falconers at a time in his court, and in his letters, he requested Arctic gyrfalcons from Lübeck and even from Greenland. One of the two existing versions was modified by his son Manfred, also a keen falconer. His mention of Greenland in his falcon treatise serves as an early non-Scandinavian reference to North America.

David Attenborough in Natural Curiosities notes that Frederick fully understood the migration of some birds at a time when all sorts of now improbable theories were common.

Frederick loved exotic animals in general: his menagerie, with which he impressed visitors from the cold cities of Northern Italy and Europe, included hounds, giraffes, cheetahs, lynxes, leopards, exotic birds and an elephant.

A number of experiments on humans were alleged by an outspoken critic of Frederick's, the monk Salimbene di Adam, and repeated by some later historians as fact. However, modern historians consider Salimbene an unreliable source, including embellishments and/or gossip in his chronicles. Salimbene describes experiments including: shutting a prisoner up in a cask to see if the soul could be observed escaping through a hole in the cask when the prisoner died; feeding two prisoners, having sent one out to hunt and the other to bed and then having them disembowelled to see which had digested his meal better; imprisoning children and then denying them any human contact to see if they would develop a natural language.

In the language deprivation experiment, young infants were supposedly raised without human interaction in an attempt to determine if there was a natural language that they might demonstrate once their voices matured. It is claimed he was seeking to discover what language would have been imparted unto Adam and Eve by God. Salimbene alleged that Frederick bade "foster-mothers and nurses to suckle and bathe and wash the children, but in no ways to prattle or speak with them; for he would have learnt whether they would speak the Hebrew language (which had been the first), or Greek, or Latin, or Arabic, or perchance the tongue of their parents of whom they had been born. But he laboured in vain, for the children could not live without clappings of the hands, and gestures, and gladness of countenance, and blandishments".

Frederick was also interested in the stars, and his court was host to many astrologers and astronomers. Several key public astrologers—such as Michael Scotus and Guido Bonatti—were his personal friends. He often sent letters to the leading scholars of the time (not only in Europe) asking for solutions to questions of science, mathematics and physics.

In 1224, he founded the University of Naples, the world's oldest state university, now called Università Federico II. Frederick chose Naples for its strategic position and its already strong role as a cultural and intellectual centre. The university focused on law and rhetoric, meant to train a new generation of jurists and officials to staff Frederick's burgeoning bureaucracy. Its students and faculty were state-sponsored and forbidden from attending other universities outside the kingdom. Perhaps the university's most famous student and lecturer was the philosopher and theologian Thomas Aquinas.

== Appearance ==
A Damascene chronicler, Sibt ibn al-Jawzi, left a physical description of Frederick based on the testimony of those who had seen the emperor in person in Jerusalem: "The Emperor was covered with red hair, was bald and myopic. Had he been a slave, he would not have fetched 200 dirhams at market." Frederick's eyes were described variously as blue, or "green like those of a serpent". Lionel Allshorn reports that Frederick was usually clean-shaven with hair of reddish hue, of medium stature and stoutly built. Even to his contemporaries, the emperor appeared as a man of masks, able to shift between them at ease. At times he was the peripatetic intellectual, clad in rough huntsman's clothes, driven by an insatiable taste for inquiry—and sensuality. At others, he was the energetic autocrat, robed in grandeur and gravitas, his "piercing, almost hypnotic gaze" showing a mix of cold detachment and audacious, even caustic irreverence. In public appearances, he maintained a stern and remote hieratic pose—vigorous and diligent, wily, severe and ruthless—yet beneath this was a restless and passionate inner nature. Always, though, his countenance revealed the same obsession: a mind ceaselessly codifying and classifying the world as he saw it, in law and politics, nature and philosophy. As the cynosure of his time, the Emperor was always conscious of his preeminent Imperial status. Frederick felt that, in everything, the stakes for which he was playing were no less than the general peace and security of Europe. His countenance tended to reflect this personal conception of supremacy.

== Law reforms and Imperial policy ==
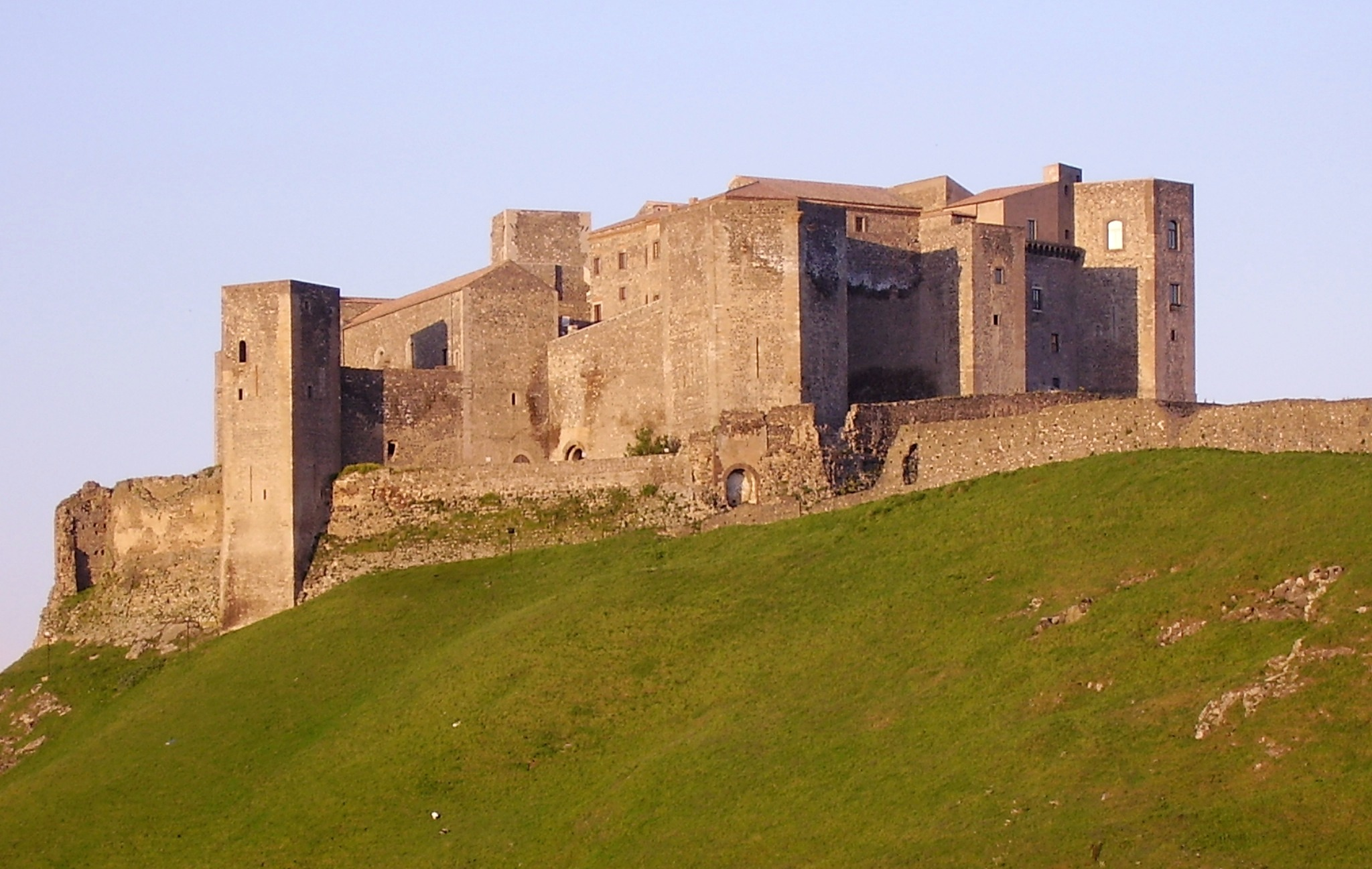
Castle of Melfi where the Constitutions were redacted

Frederick II's most profound and revolutionary legal legacy remains the Constitutions of Melfi or Constitutiones Regni Siciliarum (English: Constitutions of the Kingdom of the Sicilies), promulgated in 1231 in the Kingdom of Sicily. The sophistication of the Constitutions, also known as the Liber Augustalis, and his involvement in their formulation sets Frederick apart as perhaps the supreme lawgiver of the Middle Ages. Under the direction of a group of jurists headed by Frederick himself, including Roffredo Epifanio, Pier della Vigna, and archbishops Giacomo Amalfitano of Capua and Andrea Bonello of Barletta, the Constitutions harmonized decades of Siculo-Norman legal tradition stretching back to Roger II. Almost every aspect of Frederick's tightly governed kingdom was regulated, from a rigorously centralized judiciary and bureaucracy to commerce, coinage, financial policy, legal equality for all citizens, protections for women and prostitutes, and even provisions for the environment and public health. The kingdom was divided into eleven territorial districts called justiciaries governed by justiciars appointed by Frederick.

The purview of the justiciars reached across administrative, judicial, and even religious fields and each was subordinate to a Master Justiciar responsible for the respective region, who themselves maintained direct contact with Frederick within a pyramid-like hierarchical structure. The magistrates were elected for a year pending reappointment and received a salary from the state. This made them loyal to the king-emperor and his administration, for without it they were nothing. Any official who misused his power faced the severest penalties, threatened with confiscation of estate and even death. Every official could be sure that the emperor was actively monitoring their actions. The judiciary was relatively impartial, a fact of which Frederick was jealously proud, and the crown even lost cases in the common courts. The great officers of the Regno were the ancient ammiratus ammiratorum, the grand protonotary (or logothete), great Chamberlain, great seneschal, great chancellor, great constable, and master justiciar. The last was the head of the Magna Curia, the court of the king (his curia regis) and the final court of appeal. The Magna Curia Rationum, a division of the curia, acted as an auditing department on the great bureaucracy. Frederick also established a secret police service whose function was to prepare dossiers on the activities of subjects suspected of hostility to the state. These were compiled in state registers and presented to those who were objects of suspicion, creating an atmosphere of fear in view of the Emperor's reputation for "implacable cruelty" towards enemies of the state. Frederick's network of spies and informants seems to have been quite efficient and often he was as well-informed on what went on in a province as the local officials.

Frederick was the first European monarch to summon the Third Estate and allow civil society access to the Sicilian Parliament which now consisted of not only the barons, but the University of Naples, the medical school at Salerno, and landed commoners. It did not debate or even rubber-stamp legislation, which was the Emperor's to make and unmake, but merely received it and promulgated it, giving its advice where it could. However, it did retain the power to advise the emperor on taxation and its function likely influenced Simon de Montfort when he visited the Imperial court. State monopolies were imposed on silk, iron, and grain while tariffs and import duties on trade within the kingdom were abolished. A new gold coin called an augustalis was introduced and became widely circulated in Italy, admired even today for its splendid proto-Renaissance style and fine quality. The state monopolies on wheat and corn swelled Frederick's coffers with hefty returns. One sale of corn in Tunis during the 1230s alone netted at least £75,000, while Frederick collected direct revenue by extraordinary taxes, later levied annually and accompanied by explanations of state necessity. Before the outbreak of the war with Gregory IX and subsequently Innocent IV, Frederick was reckoned to be the wealthiest European monarch since the days of Charlemagne. The annual revenue of the Regno alone ranged between 100,000 and 300,000 ounces of gold (approximately £300,000–1,000,000 contemporary English pounds), probably well exceeding the revenues of all other Western European monarchs. Even by the reign of his son Manfred later, the kingdom remained the richest in the Mediterranean and its revenues are estimated to have been at least double those of the King of France and almost four times those of the King of England.

Per the Constitutions, Frederick II was lex animata and ruled as an absolute monarch. Since the Emperor's court was the political, cultural, and intellectual epicentre of its day, Frederick's legislative reforms likely influenced travelling jurists and legalists from all over Europe who must have returned to their native countries imbued with something of Frederick's unique brand of absolutism. It is, arguably, no accident that the 13th century saw an explosion of legislative activity across Europe. The Constitutions have been regarded as perhaps the "birth certificate" of the modern continental European state and, as such, Frederick's influence remains enormous and indelible. Something of an indirect lineage is traceable from Frederick to the structure, policies and problems of absolutism several centuries later. His legacy is deeply embedded in the history continental European statehood and, in many ways, Frederick II was perhaps the first archetypal state absolutist in Europe, supported by an autocratic, semi-bureaucratized regime in the Sicilian Regno which would eventually overheat and fragment under his Angevin successors.

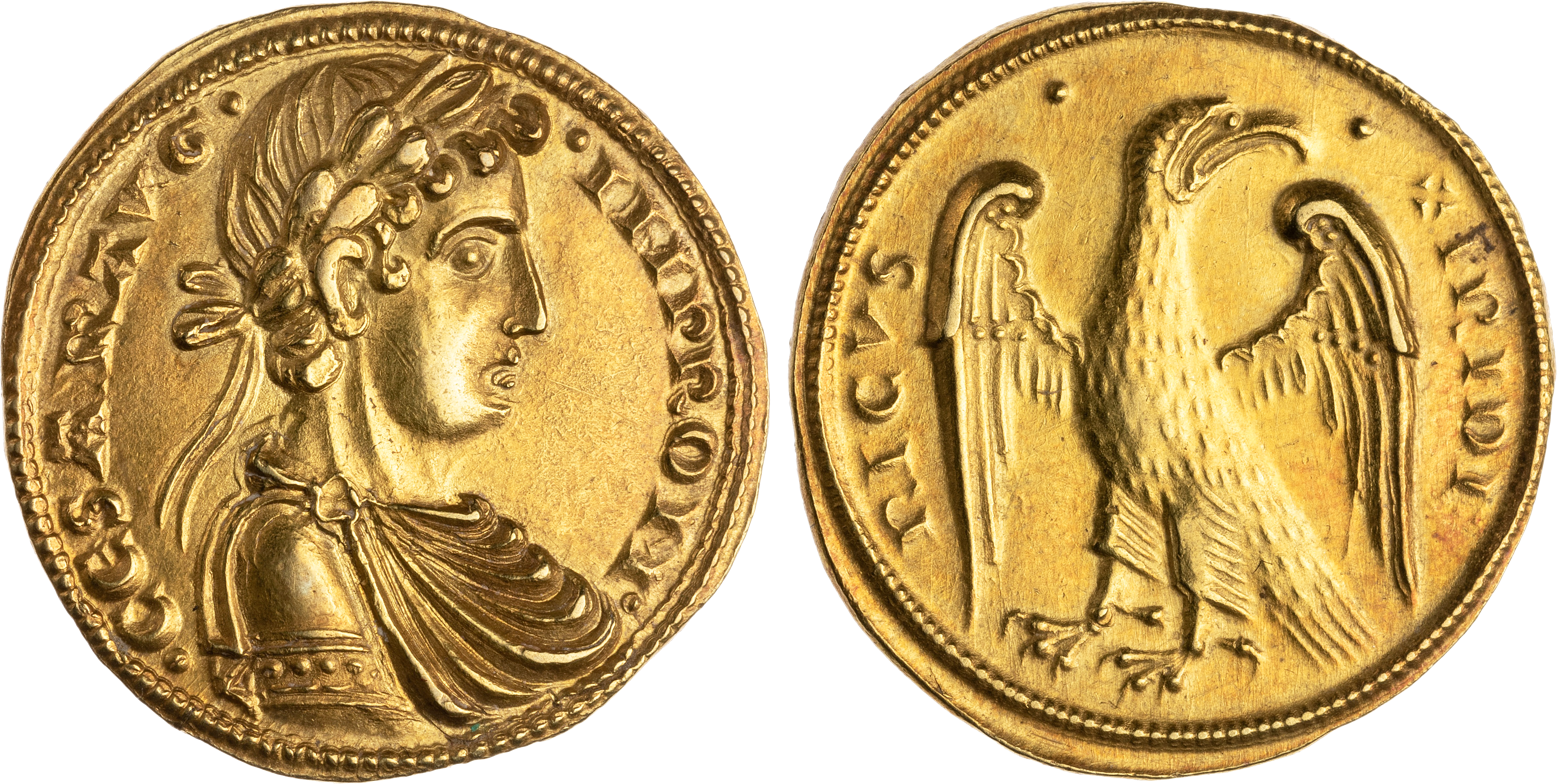
An augustale of Frederick II from Brindisi, Italy, struck after 1231. Reverse legend: "fridericus".

From 1240, in an edict issued at Foggia, Frederick II was determined to push through far-reaching reforms to establish the Sicilian kingdom and Imperial Italy as formally unified state bound by a centralized administration. He had already appointed Enzo as Legate General for all of Italy in the previous year and he now appointed several imperial vicars and captains-general to govern the provinces. The function of the Imperial vicars as military commanders and regional governors chosen for their loyalty and competence has been compared to Napoleonic marshals, and Frederick proactively supervised his cadre of officials. Frederick also placed loyal Sicilian barons as podestàs over the subject cities of northern and central Italy. The unified administration was taken over directly by the Emperor and his highly trained Sicilian officials whose jurisdiction now ranged across all of Italy. Henceforth, the new High Court of Justice would be supreme in both the Kingdom of Sicily and Imperial Italy. A central exchequer was established at Melfi to oversee financial management. The emperor also made efforts towards regulating education, commerce, and even medicine, similar to his earlier reforms in Sicily. Frederick continued to build on this unified administrative system at subsequent diets held in Italy at Siena (1243), Verona (1245), Terni and Turin (1247). For the rest of his reign, there was a continuous movement toward the extension and perfection of this new unified administrative system, with the emperor himself as the driving force.

Despite his mighty efforts however, Frederick's newly unified Italo-Sicilian regime an ultimately proved ephemeral. Robbed of his genius for state-building in its formative years, and struck by crises in the reigns of his successors, Frederick's work did not long survive him and Italian unification stalled until the 19th century. Nevertheless, the vicars and captains-general provided the prototype for the great Signori who dominated Italy in later generations and centuries. Each, such as Charles of Anjou, the Angevin Neapolitan kings Robert and Ladislaus, Ferrante of Naples later in the 15th century, or the Visconti in Milan and the della Scala in Verona, were in many ways aspiring Italian hegemons in Frederick's image, claiming for themselves a measure of his awesome prestige and might in the succeeding generations after the collapse of the Hohenstaufen empire. Some even continued to claim the title of Imperial vicar. Not until the eras of Emperor Charles V and, later, Napoleon would a single ruler so dominate all of Italy.

In 1241 Frederick introduced the Edict of Salerno (sometimes called the "Constitution of Salerno") which made the first legally fixed separation of the occupations of physician and apothecary. Physicians were forbidden to double as pharmacists and the prices of various medicinal remedies were fixed. This became a model for regulation of the practice of pharmacy throughout Europe.

Despite his efforts in Sicily and Italy, Frederick II was not able to extend his more absolutist legal reforms to Germany. In 1232, Henry (VII) was forced by the German princes to promulgate the Statutum in favorem principum. Frederick, embittered but aiming to promote cohesion in Germany in preparation for his campaigns in northern Italy, pragmatically agreed to Henry's confirmation of the charter. It was a charter of liberties for the leading German princes at the expense of the lesser nobility and the entirety of the commoners. The princes gained whole power of jurisdiction, and the power to strike their own coins. The emperor lost his right to establish new cities, castles and mints over their territories. For many years, the Statutum was thought in German historiography to have severely weakened central authority in Germany. However, it is now viewed as more a confirmation of political realities which did not necessarily denude royal power or prevent Imperial officials from enforcing Frederick's prerogatives. Rather, the Statutum affirmed a division of labour between the emperor and the princes and laid much groundwork for the development of particularism and, perhaps even federalism in Germany. Even so, from 1232 the vassals of the emperor had a veto over Imperial legislative decisions and any new law established by the emperor had to be approved by the princes. These provisions notwithstanding, royal power in Germany remained strong under Frederick.

By the 1240s, the crown was almost as rich in fiscal resources, towns, castles, enfeoffed retinues, monasteries, ecclesiastical advocacies, manors, tolls, and all other rights, revenues, and jurisdictions as it had ever been at any time since the death of Henry VI. It is unlikely that a particularly "strong ruler" such as Frederick II would have even pragmatically agreed to legislation that was concessionary rather than cooperative, neither would the princes have insisted on such. Frederick II used the political loyalty and practical jurisdictions "granted" to the higher German aristocracy to support his kingly duty of imposing peace, order, and justice upon the German realm. This is shown clearly in the Imperial Landfriede issued at Mainz in 1235, which explicitly enjoined the princes as loyal vassals to exercise their own jurisdictions in their own localities. The jurisdictional autarky of the German princes was favoured by the crown itself in the twelfth and thirteenth centuries in the interests of order and local peace. The inevitable result was the territorial particularism of churchmen, lay princes, and interstitial cities. The transference of jurisdiction was a practical solution to secure the further support of the German princes. Frederick was a ruler of vast territories who "could not be everywhere at once". He was pragmatic enough to realize that for all his ability and power, his time and focus could only be fully concentrated either north or south of the Alps, where the bulk of his resources lay. Although the Staufen core domain in southern Germany was strongly governed, the kingdom of Sicily offered a distinctly more fertile base for Frederick's grander imperial ambitions.

Frederick II's chief preoccupation was not with the advancement of the German crown itself but with a broader sovereignty that transcended any local principality or national kingship. Frederick conceived of Europe as a unique corporate body of individual secular sovereigns headed by himself as Emperor. Other monarchs, such as Louis IX of France and Henry III of England, tended to accept imperial supremacy, bound up in Frederick's personality and prestige as the preeminent sovereign in Christendom among a community of equal nations. Above all Frederick's aim was the restoration of the rights of the Empire, and himself as a Roman Emperor. It was to this ultimate end that all his policies were consistently directed. His design was to encompass this through a series of steps by which absolute sovereignty, in the Roman fashion, would be established first in Sicily, secondly in Central and Northern Italy, and finally, in Germany. Sicily certainly afforded the most favorable conditions for more complete absolutism, while the rest of Italy, never wholly separated from the classical tradition, might conceivably yield, in the course of time, to imperial authority. With the imperium thus restored to the heartland of the old Roman Empire, Germany itself could ultimately be brought into the framework of the restored Empire using the resources from south of the Alps to engraft German principalities to the Hohenstaufen domain. This bore fruit during Frederick's sojourn in 1235 and his acquisition of the Babenberg lands in 1246. As long as he was alive, even in the face of setbacks, Frederick's determination, the power of his personality, and inability of his foes to decisively dent his power made his vision seem a reality. Only after the Emperor's death did his imperial project conclusively fail. Nevertheless, taken in proper view, contrary to the received view of the supposedly inevitable shift away from broad imperial sovereignty, Frederick's policy reveals his grasp of political realities and strategic recognition of how to accomplish his vision step by step.

Frederick II showed himself capable of playing different roles across his vast territories, each tailored to what he judged more advantageous to pursuing his policy in those specific regions: in Sicily, he was the vigorous autocrat; in Germany, he was the pragmatic consensus-builder; in Imperial Italy, the ruthless powerbroker and warlord. Even against the combined opposition of the papacy and its allies in northern Italy, the ultimate failure of Frederick's design stemmed in large part from the specific crises which arose in the reigns of his successors, Conrad and Manfred, which mired and eventually destroyed his dynasty, and prevented his successors from grasping the imperial throne. So long as the Hohenstaufen controlled the Kingdom of Sicily, their core power could, perhaps, survive and project its imperial ambitions. Inherently though, it was a multi-generational task. While he lived, Frederick II was the personal expression of 'Romanity' in the medieval world, and his imperial design was alive and seemed viable. Frederick's death, however, signaled the end of the Roman model of universal empire in the Middle Ages. Given the intensity of the political situation and the structural constraints of medieval monarchy, his design was too much for the lifespan of any single ruler, even a monarch of such a forceful personality and manifold gifts. Nearly all of it collapsed over the next generation, subsumed by Italian and German regional politics, and the rise of the French monarchy. Yet, in many ways, the Hohenstaufen vision of universal Christian empire in Europe was the medieval predecessor to the hegemonic universalism of Charles V of Habsburg, Louis XIV and Napoleon, and, perhaps, the competing worldviews of order in the 20th century.

== Significance and legacy ==
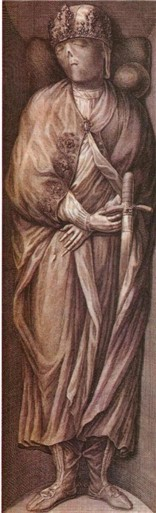
A 1781 picture showing the mummified corpse of Frederick II in Palermo

Historians rate Frederick II as a highly significant and consequential European monarch of the Middle Ages. This reputation was present even among his contemporaries, who saw him as an almost cosmic figure capable of monumental things. The emperor's posthumous shadow was scarcely less imposing than his living presence. From Matthew of Paris to Giovanni Villani, and Dante to Boccaccio, many medieval commentators, whether hostile or favorable to the emperor, seemed to have viewed him as an extraordinarily sophisticated and imaginative ruler. In the century after his death, Italian writers continued to treat Frederick as the decisive benchmark against which imperial authority, ambition, and legitimacy were measured. Yet he was still seen ambivalently, as opposed to his grandfather, Frederick Barbarossa, who was a more cleanly accessible chivalric-emperor. Indeed, the fascination Frederick II inspired was inseparable from terror. He captivated for good and ill: at once, a transformative lawgiver and symbol of universal rule, but also a potentially apocalyptic force whose political designs and despotic power, conflict with the Church, and seemingly boundless capacities could threaten the order of Christendom itself. This unique legacy kept the emperor vivid in late-medieval political thought as a figure who could aroused hopes of universal peace, fears of catastrophic conflict, and visions of providential rulership. Even by the 15th century, some writers, like the theorist and humanist Nicholas of Cusa, still held Frederick up as a provident legislator and their ideal model of a ruler.

This sense of interest, even in the refraction of more abstemious treatments, has cascaded down the centuries and Frederick has retained the enduring fascination of historians. In his influential work The Civilization of the Renaissance in Italy 19th-century German historian and philosopher Jacob Burckhardt called Frederick the "first modern man on the throne." Ernst Kantorowicz's biography, Frederick the Second, original published in 1927, is a very influential work in the historiography of the emperor. Kantorowicz praises Frederick as a genius, who created the "first western bureaucracy", an "intellectual order within the state" that acted like "an effective weapon in his fight with the Church—bound together from its birth by sacred ties in the priestly-Christian spirit of the age, and uplifted to the triumphant cult of the Deity Justitia." For Kantorowicz, Frederick was a trans-European ruler "deeply imbued" with the idea of a renovatio imperii. While Kantorowicz endorsed Burckhardt's thinking that Frederick was the prototypical modern ruler, whose Gewaltstaat (tyrannical state) later became the model of tyrannies for all Renaissance princes, Kantorowicz primarily saw Frederick as the last and greatest Christian emperor who embraced "Medieval World Unity". Coupled with this, Kantorowicz also saw Frederick as a "supremely versatile man" and the "Genius of the Renaissance"—a harbinger by which later figures would be measured against. Seen through these lens, the relatively absolutist statecraft of Frederick II has sometimes been viewed as the forerunner of the enlightened despots of the 18th century.

For the famous 19th-century English historian Edward Augustus Freeman, in sheer genius and ability, Frederick II was "surely the greatest prince who ever wore a crown", superior to Alexander, Constantine or Charlemagne, who failed to grasp nothing in the "compass of the political or intellectual world of his age". Freeman even considered Frederick to have been the last true Emperor of the West. Lionel Allshorn wrote in his 1912 biography of the emperor that Frederick surpassed all of his contemporaries and introduced the only enlightened concept of the art of government in the Middle Ages. For Allshorn, Frederick II was the "redoubtable champion of the temporal cause" and human freedom itself, who, unlike Emperor Henry IV, Frederick Barbarossa, or any other previous European monarch, never humiliated himself before the papacy and steadfastly maintained his independence. Dr. M. Schipa, in the Cambridge Medieval History, considered Frederick II the greatest singular human force of the entire European Middle Ages; a "creative spirit" who had "no equal" in the centuries between Charlemagne and Napoleon, forging in Sicily and Italy "the state as a work of art" and laying the "fertile seeds of a new era." The noted Austrian cultural historian Egon Friedell saw Frederick as the greatest of the 'four great rulers' in history, embodying the far-seeing statecraft of Julius Caesar, the intellectuality of Frederick the Great, and the enterprise and "artist's gaminerie" of Alexander the Great. For Friedell, Frederick's "free mind" and "universal comprehension" of everything human stemmed from the conviction that no one was right. W. Köhler wrote that Frederick's "marked individuality" made him the "ablest and most mature mind" of the Hohenstaufen who towered above his contemporaries. For Frederick, knowledge was power, and because of his knowledge, he wielded despotic power. Though the "sinister facts" of his despotism should not be ignored, the greatness of his mind and his energetic will compel admiration.

Modern medievalists generally no longer accept the notion, sponsored by the popes, of Frederick as an anti-Christian. They argue that Frederick understood himself as a Christian monarch in the sense of a Byzantine emperor, thus as God's "viceroy" on earth. Whatever his personal feelings toward religion, certainly submission to the pope did not enter into the matter in the slightest. This was in line with the Hohenstaufen Kaiser-Idee, the ideology claiming the Holy Roman Emperor to be the legitimate successor to the Roman Emperors. As his father Henry VI, Frederick established a famous reputation for his cosmopolitan court but on a scale of almost unparalleled grandeur. His court has drawn interest as, perhaps, a precursor comparable to those of later centuries. It seemed to match the flair of the Renaissance, the "elegance of Paris, gaiety of old imperial Vienna", and had the "zest for life" of the Elizabethans. Hosting figures such as the mathematician Fibonacci, the scholar Michael Scotus, the astrologer Guido Bonatti, the translator John of Palermo, the physician John of Procida, the Syrian philosopher Theodore of Antioch, the poet Giacomo da Lentini, and exotic servants such as the black treasury custodian Johannes Morus, the vibrant reputation of Frederick's court persisted throughout the rest of the Late Middle Ages and into the Renaissance.

20th-century treatments of Frederick vary from the sober (Wolfgang Stürner) to the dramatic (Ernst Kantorowicz). However, all agree on Frederick II's significance as Holy Roman Emperor and as a forerunner, perhaps, for succeeding generations of a conception of the "modern" state emancipated from papal claims of supremacy. Thomas Curtis Van Cleve's 1972 The Emperor Frederick II of Hohenstaufen, Immutator Mundi acknowledges the emperor's genius, as a ruler, lawgiver and scientist, and also as an extraordinary figure. For Van Cleve, Frederick has "no counterpart nor near counterpart in history." In this way, even leaving aside his cultural influence or intellectual sophistication, Frederick II can perhaps be seen as a pivot point between the Middle Ages and the Renaissance. The modern approach to Frederick II tends to be focused on the continuity between Frederick and his predecessors as Kings of Sicily and Holy Roman Emperors, and the similarities between him and other thirteenth-century monarchs. David Abulafia, in his biography subtitled "A Medieval Emperor", argues that Frederick's reputation as an enlightened figure ahead of his time is undeserved, and that Frederick was mostly a conventionally Christian monarch who sought to rule in a conventional medieval manner. For Abulafia, Frederick was fundamentally a shrewd and relatively cautious conservative rather than the bold, ingenious visionary common historiography has perhaps tended to mythologize him as. Nevertheless, more recent sober treatments notwithstanding, Frederick II still commands a lasting popular reputation as a polyhedral monarch who transcended his time. Indeed, despite the innate controversy of his life and reign, his overall reputation points to the success of emperor's personal image-making, and some historians have pointed to Frederick's part as a conscious driving force behind his own mythology. All in all, however, the general memory of the emperor is that of a figure of astonishing breadth and ability: a polymath and polyglot, statesman and lawgiver, poet, mathematician, and naturalist; a brilliant autocrat the head of a sophisticated state, surrounded by his magnificent court which seemed to presage the Renaissance.

In this vein, Carol Lansing and Edward English, two British historians, argue that medieval Palermo has been overlooked in favour of Paris and London:

One effect of this approach has been to privilege historical winners, [and] aspects of medieval Europe that became important in later centuries, above all the nation state.... Arguably the liveliest cultural innovation in the 13th century was Mediterranean, centered on Frederick II's polyglot court and administration in Palermo.... Sicily and the Italian South in later centuries suffered a long slide into overtaxed poverty and marginality. Textbook narratives therefore focus not on medieval Palermo, with its Muslim and Jewish bureaucracies and Arabic-speaking monarch, but on the historical winners, Paris and London.

Friedrich Nietzsche, a prominent German philosopher, mentioned Frederick in his book Beyond Good and Evil (Part V, aphorism 200). Nietzsche seems to admire Frederick as an archetypal übermensch who resisted the conventional morals of his time and had the courage to create his own moral code to live by. He compares Frederick to figures like Caesar and Leonardo da Vinci, both of whom he sees as embodying strong individualism and, most importantly, the will to power—which Nietzsche believed to be the very core of human greatness.

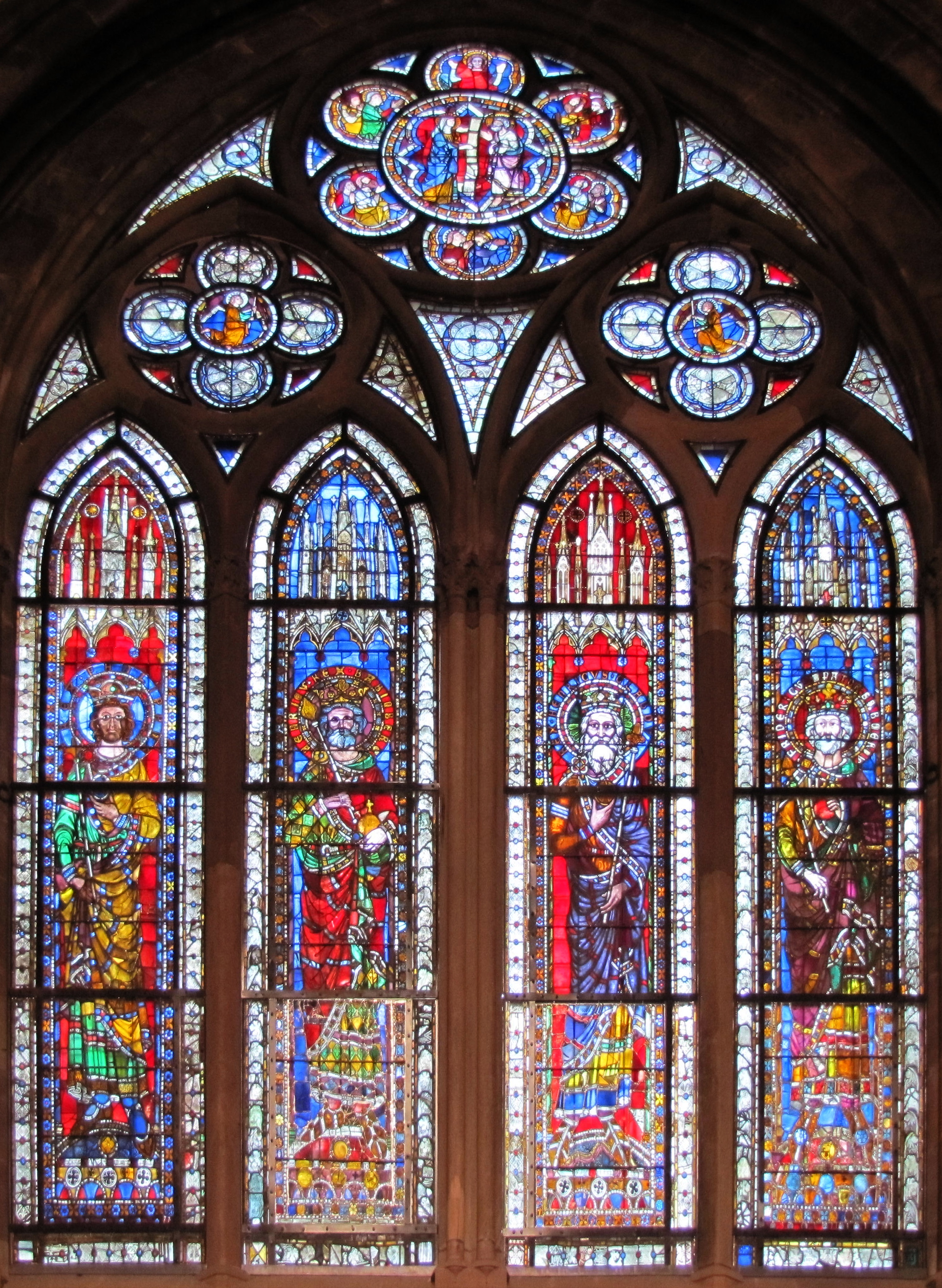
Stained glass windows from the Strasbourg Cathedral, Bas-Rhin, Alsace, France, dated circa 1210–1270, depicting emperors of the Holy Roman Empire: Philip of Swabia, Henry IV, Henry V, and Frederick II

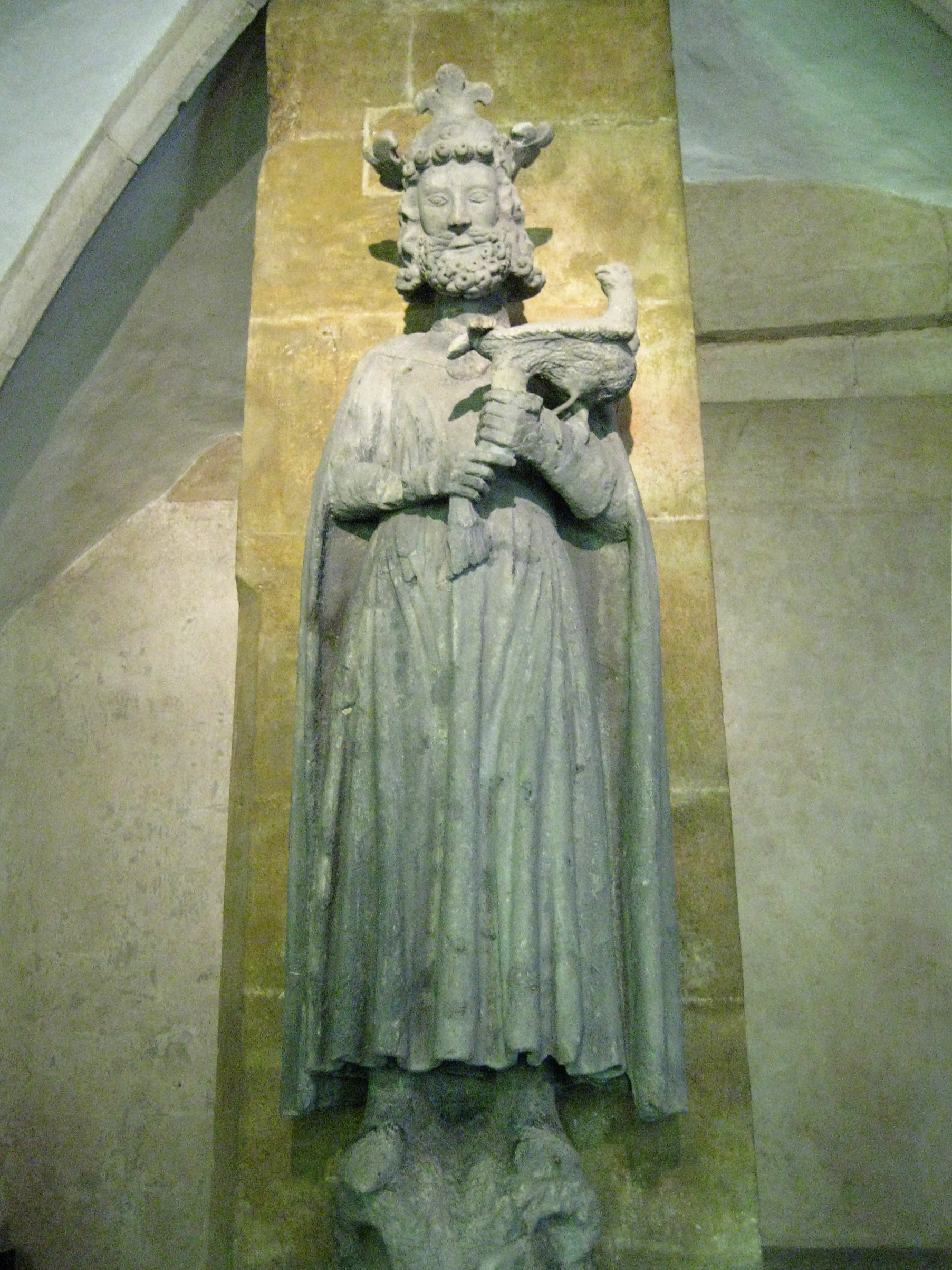
A statue of Frederick II from the Black Tower of Regensburg, c. 1280–1290

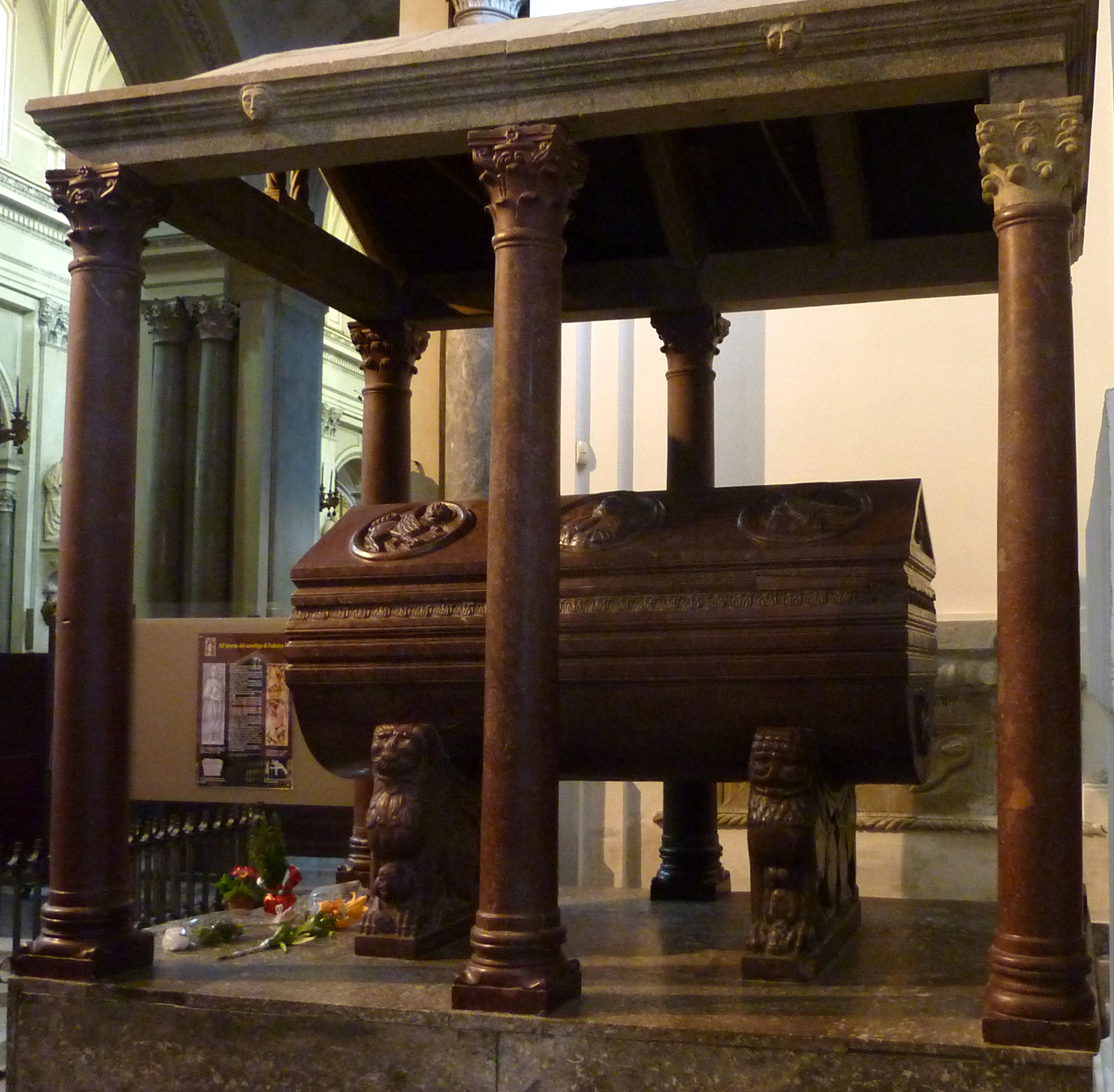
Flowers at the tomb of Frederick II in the Cathedral of Palermo

== Family ==
Frederick left numerous children, legitimate and illegitimate:

=== Legitimate issue ===
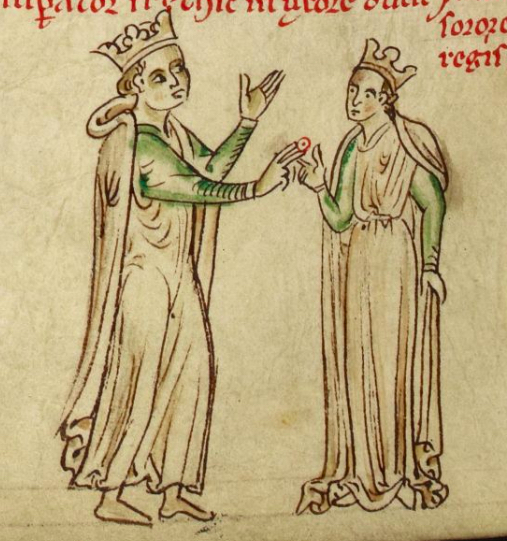
The wedding of Frederick II and Isabella of England

First wife: Constance of Aragon (1179 – 23 June 1222). Marriage: 15 August 1209, at Messina, Sicily.

- Henry (VII) (1211 – 12 February 1242).

Second wife: Isabella II of Jerusalem (1212 – 25 April 1228). Marriage: 9 November 1225, at Brindisi, Apulia.

- Margaret (November 1226 – August 1227).
- Conrad IV (25 April 1228 – 21 May 1254).

Third wife: Isabella of England (1214 – 1 December 1241). Marriage: 15 July 1235, at Worms, Germany.

- Jordan (born during the spring of 1236, failed to survive the year); this child was given the baptismal name Jordanus as he was baptized with water brought for that purpose from the Jordan River.
- Agnes (b and d. 1237).
- Henry Charles Otto (18 February 1238 – May 1253), named after Henry III of England, his uncle; appointed Governor of Sicily and promised to become King of Jerusalem after his father died, but he, too, died within three years and was never crowned. Betrothed to many of Pope Innocent IV's nieces, but never married any.
- Margaret (1 December 1241 – 8 August 1270), married Albert, Landgrave of Thuringia, later Margrave of Meissen.

=== Mistresses and illegitimate issue ===
- Unknown name, Sicilian countess. Her exact parentage is unknown, but Thomas Tuscus's Gesta Imperatorum et Pontificum (c. 1280) stated she was a nobili comitissa quo in regno Sicilie erat heres.
  - Frederick of Pettorano (1212/13 – after 1240), who fled to Spain with his wife and children in 1240.
- Adelheid (Adelaide) of Urslingen (c. 1184 – c. 1222). Her relationship with Frederick II took place during the time he stayed in Germany between 1215 and 1220. According to some sources, she was related to the Hohenburg family under the name Alayta of Vohburg (it: Alayta di Marano); but the most accepted theory stated she was the daughter of Conrad of Urslingen, Count of Assisi and Duke of Spoleto.
  - Enzo of Sardinia (1215–1272). The powerful Bentivoglio family of Bologna and Ferrara claimed descent from him.
  - Caterina da Marano (1216/18 – aft. 1272), who married firstly with NN and secondly with Giacomo del Carretto, marquis of Noli and Finale.
- Matilda or Maria, from Antioch.
  - Frederick of Antioch (1221–1256). Although Frederick has been ascribed up to eight children, only two, perhaps three, can be identified from primary documents. His son, Conrad, was alive as late as 1301. His daughter Philippa, born around 1242, married Manfredi Maletta, the grand chamberlain of Manfredi Lancia, in 1258. She was imprisoned by Charles of Anjou and died in prison in 1273. Maria, wife of Barnabò Malaspina, may also have been his daughter.
- An unknown member of the Lancia family:
  - Selvaggia (1221/23–1244), married Ezzelino III da Romano.
- Manna, niece of Berardo di Castagna, Archbishop of Palermo:
  - Richard of Chieti (1224/25 – 26 May 1249).
- Anais of Brienne (c. 1205–1236), cousin of Isabella II of Jerusalem:
  - Blanchefleur (1226 – 20 June 1279), Dominican nun in Montargis, France.
- Richina of Wolfsöden (c. 1205–1236):
  - Margaret of Swabia (1230–1298), married Thomas of Aquino, count of Acerra.
- Unknown mistress:
  - Gerhard of Koskele (died after 1255), married Magdalena, daughter of Caupo of Turaida.

Frederick had a relationship with Bianca Lancia (c. 1200/10 – 1230/46), possibly starting around 1225. One source states that it lasted 20 years. They had three children:

- Constance (Anna) (1230 – April 1307), married John III Ducas Vatatzes.
- Manfred (1232 – killed in battle, Benevento, 26 February 1266), first Regent, later King of Sicily.
- Violante (1233–1264), married Riccardo Sanseverino, count of Caserta.

Matthew of Paris relates the story of a marriage confirmatio matrimonii in articulo mortis (on her deathbed) between them when Bianca was dying, but this marriage was never recognized by the Church. Nevertheless, Bianca's children were apparently regarded by Frederick as legitimate, legitimatio per matrimonium subsequens, evidenced by his daughter Constance's marriage to the Nicaean Emperor, and his own will, in which he appointed Manfred as Prince of Taranto and Regent of Sicily. (Note: A charter issued by Emperor Frederick II dated 1248 was witnessed by Manfred [III], Marquis of Lancia, "our beloved kinsman" [dilectus affinis noster]. The word here used for kinsman is "affinis," that is, kinsman by marriage, not blood. A transcript of this charter is published in Huillard-Bréholles, in 1861.)

== Gallery ==
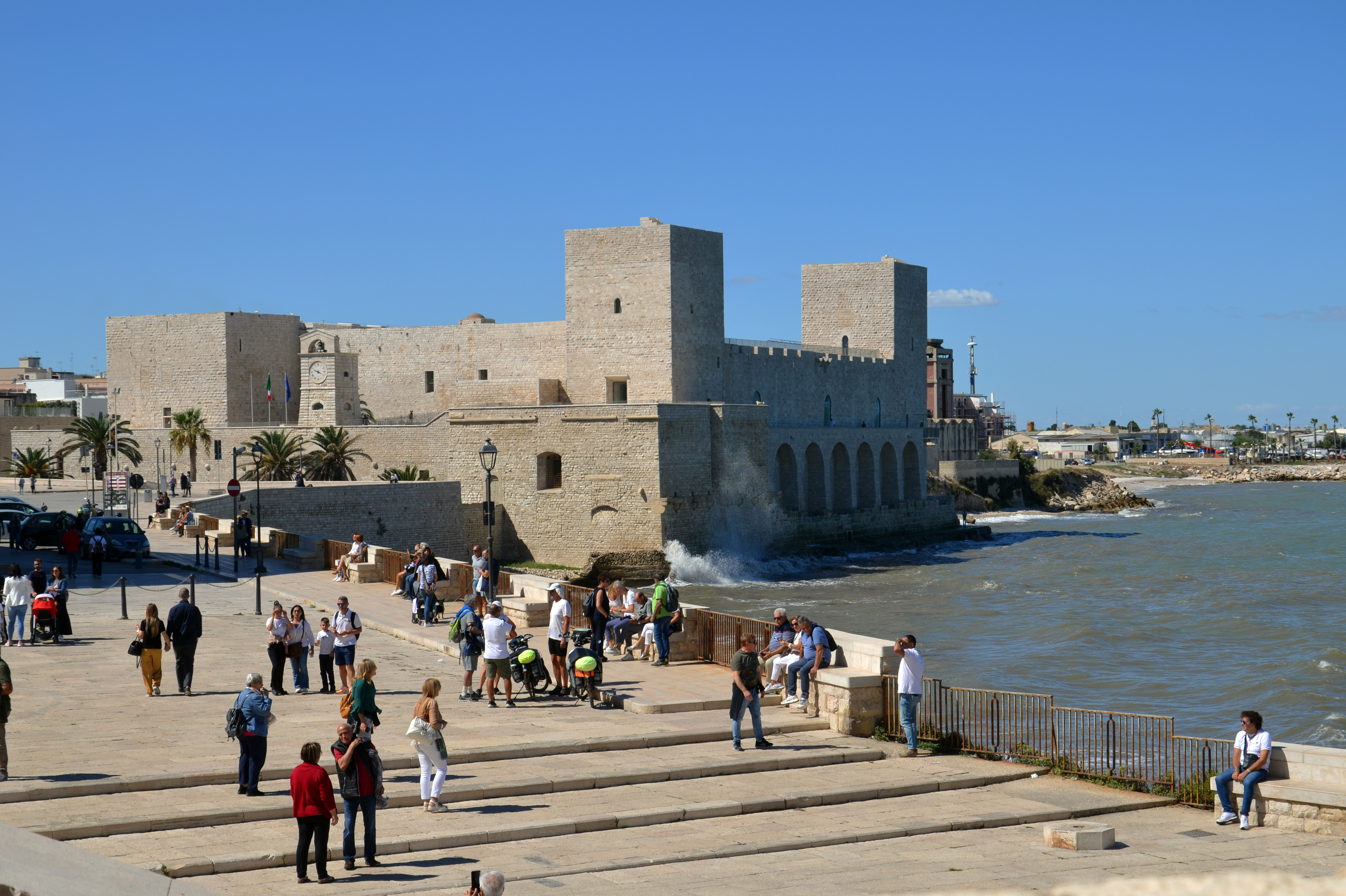
The Castello Svevo at Trani built by Frederick II from 1233 to 1249

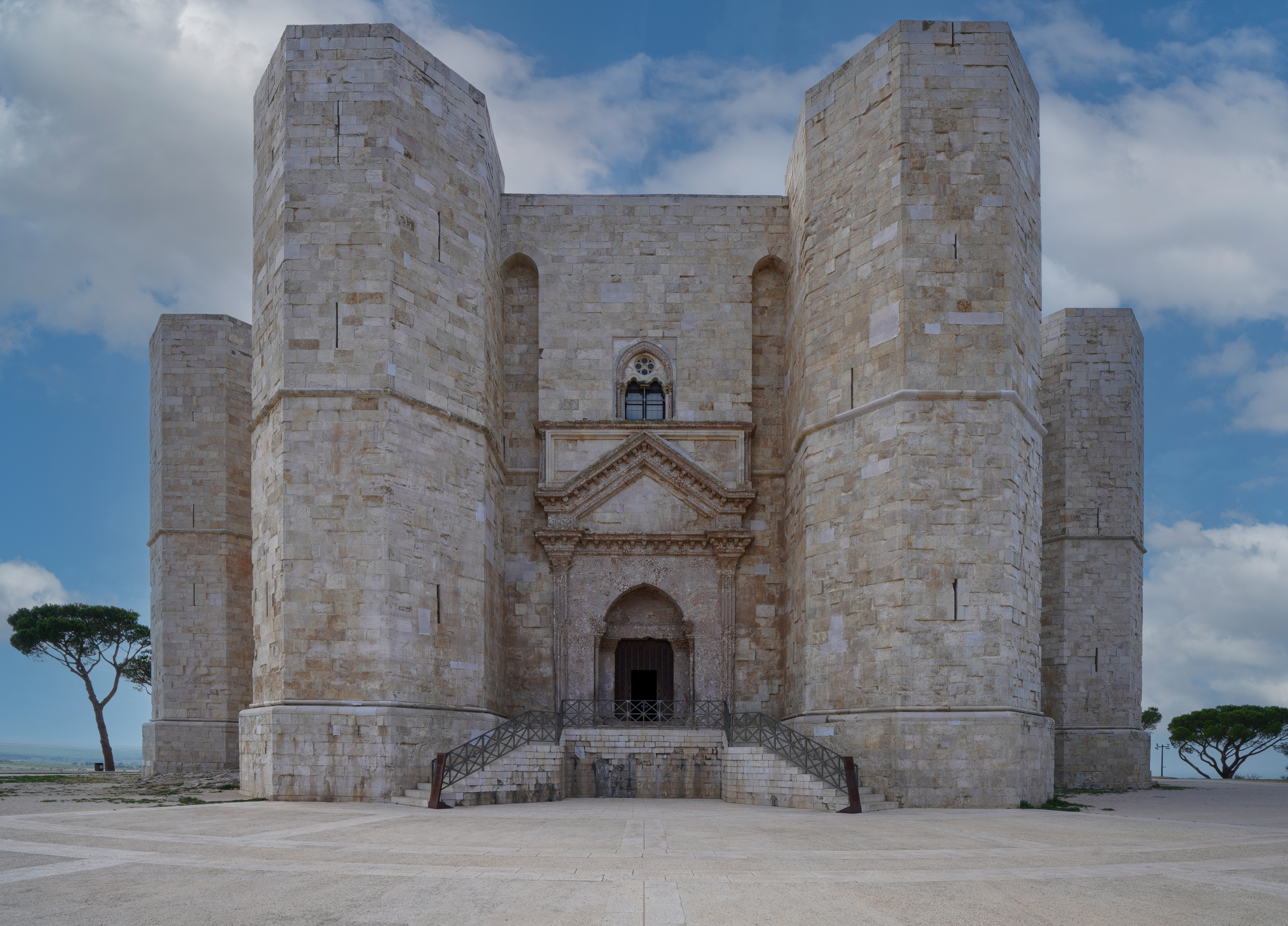
Castel del Monte near Andria built by King Frederick II from 1240 to 1250

Arms of the House of Hohenstaufen

Arms of the House of Hohenstaufen as Holy Roman Emperor

Attributed Coat of Arms of Frederick II, Holy Roman Emperor (or, double-headed eagle sable)

Coat of Arms of the Kingdom of Sicily (House of Hohenstaufen)

== See also ==
- Dukes of Swabia family tree
- Family tree of the German monarchs
- Frederick the Second, Kantorowicz's biography of Frederick

== Bibliography ==
- Abulafia, David (1988). Frederick II: A Medieval Emperor. Penguin Press. ISBN 88-06-13197-4.
- Alio, Jacqueline (2017). The Ferraris Chronicle: Popes, Emperors, and Deeds in Apulia 1096–1228. Trinacria. ISBN 978-1-943-63916-8.
- Barraclough, Geoffrey (1984). The Origins of Modern Germany. Norton. ISBN 0-393-30153-2.
- Busk, William (1856). Mediæval popes, emperors, kings, and crusaders; or, Germany, Italy, and Palestine from A.D. 1125 to A.D. 1268, Volume III. London: Hookham & Sons. "contents."
- Busk, William (1856). Mediæval popes, emperors, kings, and crusaders; or, Germany, Italy, and Palestine from A.D. 1125 to A.D. 1268, Volume IV. London: Hookham & Sons.
- Cassady, Richard F. (2011). The Emperor and the Saint: Frederick II of Hohenstaufen, Francis of Assisi, and Journeys to Medieval Places. DeKalb: Northern Illinois University Press.
- Cavendish, Richard (December 2000). "Death of the Emperor Frederick II". History Today. 50 (12).
- Davis, R. H. C. (1988). A History of Medieval Europe. Longman. ISBN 0-582-01404-2.
- Fournier, Paul (1885). Le royaume d'Arles et de Vienne sous le règne de Frédéric II (1214–1250). Grenoble: G. Dupont.
- Houben, Hubert (2002). Roger II of Sicily: A Ruler Between East and West. Cambridge University Press.
- Jackson, Peter (2005). The Mongols and the West, 1221–1410. Routledge.
- Jedin, Hubert; Dolan, John Patrick, eds. (1980). History of the Church: From the High Middle Ages to the eve of the Reformation, Volume IV. London: Burns & Oates Publishers. ISBN 9780860120865.
- Jones, Chris (2007). Eclipse of Empire? Perceptions of the Western Empire and its Rulers in Late-Medieval France. Brepols.
- Kamp, N (1975). "Capocci, Raniero (Raynerius de Viterbio, Rainerius, Ranerius, Reinerius)". Dizionario Biografico degli Italiani (in Italian). Vol. 18. Treccani.
- Kamp, N (1995). "Federico II di Svevia, imperatore, re di Sicilia e di Gerusalemme, re dei Romani". Dizionario Biografico degli Italiani (in Italian). Vol. 45. Treccani.
- Kantorowicz, Ernst (1931). Frederick the Second, 1194–1250. Translated by E. O. Lorimer. Frederick Ungar.
- Kantorowicz, Ernst (1937). Frederick the Second, 1194–1250. New York: Frederick Ungar.
- Kohn, George Childs (1999). Dictionary of Wars (Revised ed.). New York: Facts on File, Inc. ISBN 0-8160-3928-3.
- Loud, G. A. (2016) [2011]. "The Papal 'Crusade' against Frederick II in 1228–1230". In Michel Balard (ed.). La Papauté et les croisades / The Papacy and the Crusades. Routledge. pp. 91–103.
- Maalouf, Amin (1989). The Crusades Through Arab Eyes. Schocken. ISBN 0-8052-0898-4.
- Mendola, Louis (2016). Frederick, Conrad and Manfred of Hohenstaufen, Kings of Sicily: The Chronicle of Nicholas of Jamsilla. Trinacria. ISBN 978-1-943-63906-9.
- Masson, Georgina (1957). Frederick II of Hohenstaufen. Martin Secker & Warburg. ISBN 88-452-9107-3.
- Paris, Matthew (1854). English History. Vol. III. London: Henry G. Bohn.
- Powell, James M. (April 2007). "Church and Crusade: Frederick II and Louis IX". Catholic Historical Review. 93 (2): 251–264. doi:10.1353/cat.2007.0201. S2CID 154964516.
- Pybus, H. J. (1930). "The Emperor Frederick II and the Sicilian Church". Cambridge Historical Journal. 3 (2): 134–163. doi:10.1017/s1474691300002444.
- Salimbene di Adam (2004). Chronicle (in Russian). Translated by I. S. Kultysheva; S. S. Prokopovich; V. D. Savukova; M. A. Tariverdieva. Moscow: ROSSPEN.
- Saunders, J. J. (1971). The History of the Mongol Conquests. Routledge & Kegan Paul. ISBN 9780710070739.
- Scales, Len (2012). The Shaping of German Identity: Authority and Crisis, 1245–1414. Cambridge University Press.
- Smith, Thomas W. "Between two kings: Pope Honorius III and the seizure of the Kingdom of Jerusalem by Frederick II in 1225." Journal of Medieval History 41, 1 (2015): 41–59.
- Sodders, Daniel R. (1996). Conrad the Fourth as German King, 1237–1250 (PhD dissertation). University of Kansas.
- Van Cleve, T. C. (1972). The Emperor Frederick II of Hohenstaufen: Immutator Mundi. Oxford. ISBN 0-198-22513-X.
- Vercamer, Grischa (2021). "The Mongol Invasion in the Year 1241—Reactions among European Rulers and Consequences for East Central European Principalities". Zeitschrift für Ostmitteleuropa-Forschung. 70 (2): 227–262. doi:10.25627/202170210926.
- Whalen, Brett Edward (2019). The Two Powers: The Papacy, the Empire, and the Struggle for Sovereignty in the Thirteenth Century. University of Pennsylvania Press.
- Wood, Casey A.; Fyfe, F. Marjorie, eds. (2004) [c. 1250]. The Art of Falconry: Being the De arte venandi cum avibus of Frederick II of Hohenstaufen. Stanford: Stanford University Press. ISBN 978-0-8047-0374-1. OCLC 474664651.

Frederick II, Holy Roman Emperor House of Hohenstaufen Born: 1194 Died: 1250
Regnal titles
| Preceded by Constance I | King of Sicily; 1198–1250 with Constance I (1198); Henry II (1212–1217) | Succeeded by Conrad I & II |
| Preceded by John; Isabella II | King of Jerusalem; 1225–1243 with Isabella II (1225–1228); Conrad II (1228–1243) | Succeeded by Conrad I & II |
| Preceded by Philip | Duke of Swabia; 1212–1216 | Succeeded by Henry (VII) |
| Preceded by Otto IV | King of Germany; 1212–1250 | Succeeded by Conrad IV |
| Preceded by Otto IV | King of Italy; 1212–1250 | Succeeded by Conrad IV |
| Preceded by Otto IV | Holy Roman Emperor; 1220–1250 | Succeeded by Henry VII |
