= Battle of Parma (1250) =

1250 imperial victory over Parma

Second Battle of Parma
- Part of the Guelph–Ghibelline conflict
Date	18 August 1250
Location	Outside Parma, Kingdom of Italy
Result	Imperial victory: Parmese field army routed; Parma remains under Guelph control

Belligerents
Holy Roman Empire; Ghibelline cities: Cremona; Bergamo; Lodi; Pavia; Parmese Ghibelline exiles	Parma: Guelph civic forces

Commanders and leaders
Oberto Pallavicino	Castellano Carboni

Strength
5,000–7,000: Ghibelline cavalry and infantry	4,000–6,000: Cavalry, infantry and carroccio

Casualties and losses
Few hundred killed or wounded	2,000–3,000 killed, wounded or captured: About 2,000 captured; Dozens to hundreds drowned during the retreat; Carroccio captured

The Second Battle of Parma was fought on 18 August 1250 outside Parma between an imperial-Ghibelline army commanded by Oberto Pallavicino and the Guelph forces of the city. Pallavicino's army, composed principally of contingents from Cremona, Bergamo, Lodi and Pavia, routed the Parmese field army after threatening to cut off its retreat into the city. The withdrawal became a disaster when the bridge across the defensive ditch collapsed beneath the fugitives; large numbers were killed or captured and Parma's carroccio fell into imperial hands. Despite the scale of the battlefield success, Pallavicino did not capture Parma, which remained within the anti-imperial coalition.

== Background ==
Parma had become one of the principal centres of resistance to Emperor Frederick II after its defection from the imperial camp in 1247. Its forces had destroyed Frederick's fortified siege settlement of Vittoria in February 1248, inflicting a serious material and political setback on the emperor. Yet the victory had failed to destroy Frederick's position in northern Italy, where warfare continued as a shifting contest between rival communal coalitions and regional commanders. By 1249 the imperial position had suffered further disruption following the capture of Enzo of Sardinia, the emperor’s son and general legate of Italy, at the Battle of Fossalta, requiring a reorganisation of Frederick's command structure in Lombardy.

Responsibility for rebuilding the imperial position increasingly fell to Oberto Pallavicino. After Enzo's capture, Pallavicino became imperial podestà of Cremona, the principal political and military centre of the Hohenstaufen alliance in Lombardy. He rapidly consolidated his authority there and gathered support among neighbouring Ghibelline cities. The anti-imperial coalition was meanwhile experiencing its own strains. Piacenza suffered political unrest and mounting discontent over the financial and logistical burden of supporting Parma, weakening the cohesion of the Guelph front in western Emilia.

== Battle ==
On 18 August Pallavicino advanced towards Parma with troops from Cremona, Bergamo, Lodi and Pavia, accompanied by Parmese Ghibelline exiles. Rather than remain behind the walls, the Parmese marched out to meet him with cavalry, infantry and their carroccio under the podestà Castellano Carboni. Fighting began between the advanced elements of the two armies and quickly became severe.

Pallavicino then executed the manoeuvre that determined the engagement. While the opposing vanguards remained occupied, he detached part of his cavalry, led by the Parmese exiles, and sent it around the enemy position toward the route connecting the Parmese army with the city. Faced with the danger of being cut off from the gates and attacked from the rear, the Parmese lost cohesion and began a disorderly retreat. The withdrawal turned into a rout as soldiers and accompanying civilians crowded onto the drawbridge across the city ditch. Under the weight of the fugitives the structure collapsed, throwing large numbers into the water below. Contemporary evidence indicates dozens and possibly hundreds drowned.

Approximately 2,000 Parmese, mostly infantrymen, were taken prisoner. Pallavicino's troops also seized the carroccio, a particularly potent symbolic prize after the Cremonese carroccio had itself been captured during the destruction of Vittoria two years earlier. Carboni and a substantial portion of the surviving army nevertheless succeeded in reaching the city and closing its gates.

== Aftermath ==
The victory was celebrated extensively at Cremona and publicised by the imperial chancery as evidence of a revival in Frederick's fortunes. The seizure of Parma's carroccio carried particular propagandistic force, symbolically avenging the humiliation suffered at Vittoria in 1248. Frederick himself subsequently included the victory near Parma among the military successes announced to allies abroad as he attempted to demonstrate the continuing strength of the imperial cause.

Its immediate strategic consequences were limited. Pallavicino hesitated after the battle, while Parma recovered sufficiently to defend its walls. Cardinal Ottaviano degli Ubaldini arrived rapidly with a substantial body of cavalry from Bologna, Modena, Piacenza and Milan, reinforcing the city before the imperial commander could exploit his victory. Pallavicino therefore abandoned any attempt to take Parma and returned to Cremona. Parma remained firmly in the Guelph camp and the political balance in the Po valley remained essentially unchanged.

The engagement nevertheless demonstrated the renewed effectiveness of the imperial forces under Pallavicino after the reverses of 1248–1249. Even after the loss of Enzo, Frederick retained capable lieutenants and a functioning coalition of powerful northern communes. At the same time, the inability to convert the battlefield victory into Parma's capture illustrated the increasingly fragmented character of the wider war: individual armies could inflict severe defeats without obtaining a permanent strategic settlement. By the autumn of 1250 the conflict remained active but dispersed, with both sides under mounting financial and logistical pressure.

== Sources ==
- Abulafia, David (1988). Frederick II: A Medieval Emperor. London: Allen Lane. ISBN 9780713990041.
- Grillo, Paolo (2023). Federico II: La guerra, le città e l'Impero. Milan: Mondadori. ISBN 978-88-04-76912-5.
- Stürner, Wolfgang (2000). Friedrich II. Teil 2: Der Kaiser 1220–1250. Darmstadt: Primus Verlag. ISBN 978-3-534-12229-5.
