= Battle of Cingoli =

Battle in 1250 in Italy

- Part of the Guelph–Ghibelline conflict
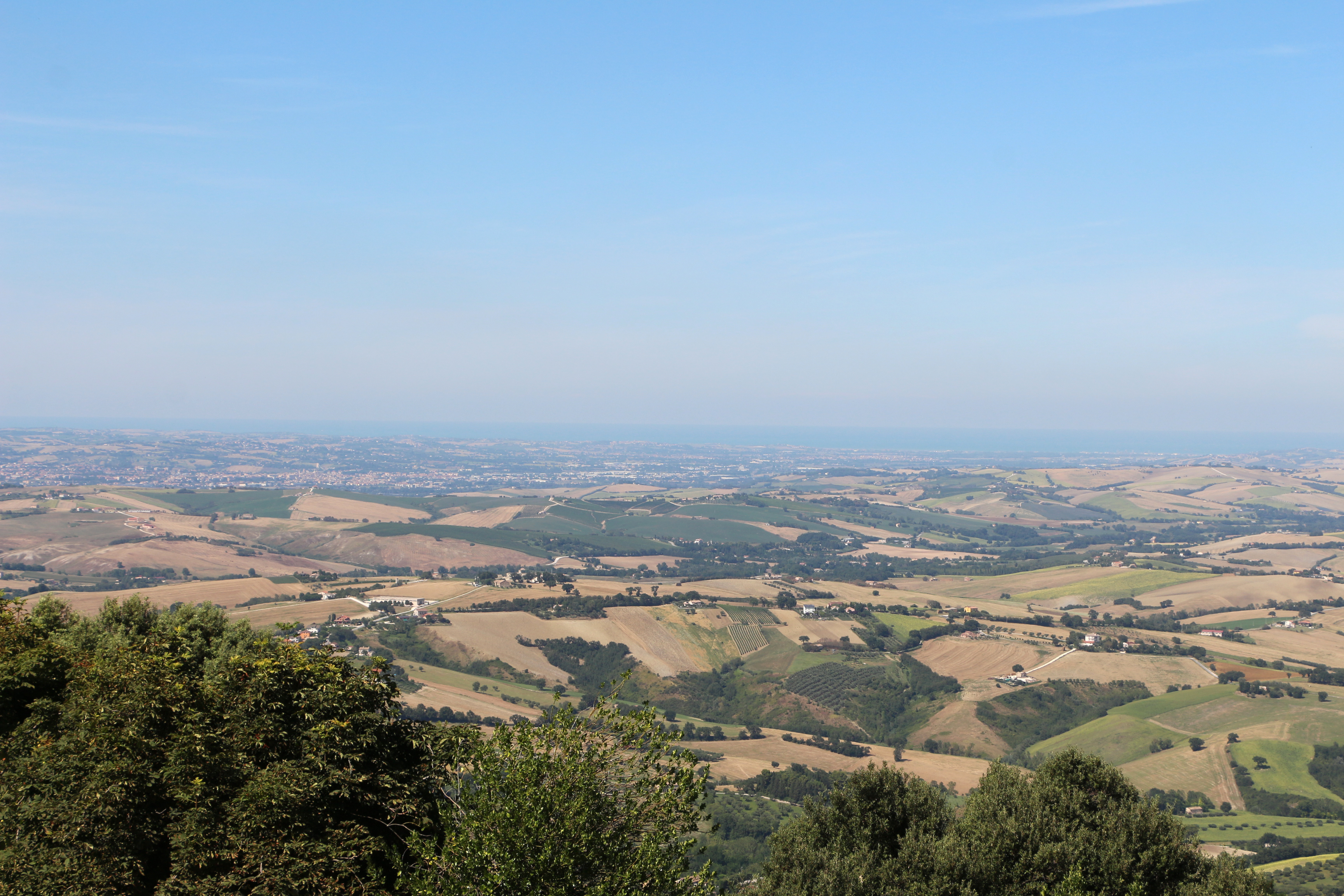
- View of the landscape near Cingoli, near the possible site of the battle
Date	20 August 1250
Location	Near Cingoli, March of Ancona
Result	Imperial victory: Imperial authority restored over much of the March of Ancona

Belligerents
Holy Roman Empire; Kingdom of Sicily; Ghibellines	Papal States; Guelphs

Commanders and leaders
Walter of Manoppello	Pietro Capocci

Strength
2,000–3,000 men: Imperial cavalry and retainers; Ghibelline communal infantry and cavalry	3,000–4,000 men: Papal troops; Guelph communal contingents

Casualties and losses
Few hundred killed or wounded	2,000 killed, wounded or captured

The Battle of Cingoli was fought near Cingoli in the March of Ancona during the final phase of the conflict between Emperor Frederick II and Pope Innocent IV. Papal forces under Pietro Capocci, who had been entrusted with rebuilding the Church's military position in central Italy, were defeated by the imperial army commanded by Walter of Manoppello. The battle ended in an imperial victory and was followed by the recovery of Ascoli, Macerata, Osimo, Fermo and several smaller centres for the imperial cause, reversing much of the papal advance in the region.

== Background ==
By 1249 the long conflict between Frederick II and Innocent IV had entered a particularly unstable phase. Imperial fortunes had deteriorated sharply in northern and central Italy following the destruction of the imperial siege camp at Vittoria in 1248 and the defeat at the Battle of Fossalta in May 1249, where Frederick's son and imperial lieutenant Enzo was captured. In central Italy, papal forces had simultaneously made extensive gains in Romagna and the March of Ancona.

Believing Frederick's power to be approaching collapse, Innocent IV attempted to exploit the situation by extending the offensive towards the Kingdom of Sicily. On 7 April 1249 he appointed the Roman cardinal Pietro Capocci as special legate with extensive authority in the Papal States, the Duchy of Spoleto, the March of Ancona and the Sicilian kingdom. Capocci was empowered to mobilise the military resources of communes, ecclesiastical vassals, bishops and monasteries and was provided with substantial funds for raising troops. Ottaviano degli Ubaldini was ordered to support him with cavalry and crossbowmen. Capocci's mission was an attempt to reorganise the ecclesiastical forces of central Italy into an effective field army. Concentrating initially on the March of Ancona, however, he soon encountered renewed imperial resistance under Frederick's lieutenant in the region, Walter of Manoppello.

== Battle ==
Capocci's forces suffered an initial setback during the opening months of 1250, when imperial supporters around Civitanova successfully resisted the papal offensive. The more serious confrontation occurred near Cingoli, southwest of Ancona. On 20 August 1250 Walter of Manoppello brought the imperial army of the March against Capocci's forces and inflicted a considerably heavier defeat upon them.

The detailed tactical course of the engagement is poorly recorded. The surviving evidence nevertheless indicates that Cingoli was a substantial field action rather than a minor skirmish. Capocci had been charged by Innocent IV with assembling the available papal and communal military resources of central Italy into an effective army, while Walter of Manoppello commanded the organised imperial forces operating throughout the March. The battle ended in a sound imperial victory and seriously weakened Capocci's ability to maintain the territorial gains recently achieved by the papal party.

The victory was directly followed by the transfer of several important Marcher communes back to imperial control. The defeats suffered by papal forces in the Marches were heavy, and Capocci's reverses on the Adriatic front were severe. Although the surviving sources do not preserve secure contemporary totals for the armies or their losses, the scale of the subsequent political reversal indicates that Capocci's force suffered a serious battlefield defeat.

== Aftermath ==
The victory at Cingoli produced immediate political consequences throughout the March of Ancona. Capocci was forced to relinquish control of Ascoli, Macerata, Osimo, Fermo and several smaller centres to Walter of Manoppello. The reversal effectively cancelled much of the progress made by the papal party in the region during the preceding year, when Raniero Capocci and other papal representatives had succeeded in dismantling much of the imperial position in central-eastern Italy.

Cingoli was a painful papal military reverse. Although Frederick subsequently exaggerated the extent of the success by claiming that the communes of the March and the Duchy of Spoleto had universally submitted, a considerable number did return to imperial obedience following the victory. The result formed part of a broader improvement in imperial fortunes during 1250 and contributed to renewed confidence concerning the course of the war.

Frederick's chancery publicised the reverses suffered by Capocci as evidence that fortune had again turned towards the Empire. Reports of the victories in the Marches were circulated to Conrad IV, the German princes and Frederick's subjects in the Kingdom of Sicily, where they were presented as the beginning of an approaching imperial recovery. The strategic situation nevertheless remained fluid. Changes of allegiance in the Marches were frequent, and papal successes elsewhere in central Italy prevented Cingoli itself from deciding the wider war. Still, the battle represented one of the most substantial imperial victories of the emperor's final year and contributed to a broader sense of imperial recovery.

A few months later, on 13 December, Frederick II died at Castel Fiorentino in the Kingdom of Sicily.

== Sources ==
- Abulafia, David (1988). Frederick II: A Medieval Emperor. London: Allen Lane. ISBN 978-0-7139-9004-1.
- Grillo, Paolo (2023). Federico II: La guerra, le città e l'Impero. Milan: Mondadori. ISBN 978-88-04-76912-5.
- Stürner, Wolfgang (2000). Friedrich II. Teil 2: Der Kaiser 1220–1250. Darmstadt: Primus Verlag. ISBN 3-89678-025-5.
