= Battle of Florence (1248) =

1248 imperial-Ghibelline victory in Florence

- Part of the Guelph–Ghibelline conflict
Date	31 January – 2 February 1248
Location	Florence, Kingdom of Italy
Result	Imperial–Ghibelline victory: Florentine Guelph faction defeated and expelled

Belligerents
Holy Roman Empire; Florentine Ghibellines: Uberti family; Imperial German cavalry; Tuscan Ghibelline contingents	Florentine Guelphs: Guelph aristocratic families; Popular and civic forces

Commanders and leaders
Frederick of Antioch; Farinata degli Uberti	Guelph faction leaders

Strength
4,000–5,000: 1,600 cavalry under Frederick of Antioch	5,000–6,000: Guelph cavalry, infantry and urban militia

Casualties and losses
Few hundred killed or wounded	500–1,000 killed or wounded: Hundreds driven into exile

The Battle of Florence was an urban conflict fought from 31 January to 2 February 1248 between the Ghibelline government of Florence, supported by imperial troops under Frederick of Antioch, and the city's Guelph faction. The fighting formed part of the wider struggle between Emperor Frederick II and his opponents in central and northern Italy. After several days of street fighting, the arrival of Frederick of Antioch with 1,600 cavalry shifted the balance strongly in favour of the Ghibellines. The Guelphs resisted until 2 February before abandoning Florence, after which their houses and towers were destroyed and imperial control over the commune was considerably strengthened.

== Background ==
Florence had long been divided by rival aristocratic networks whose political struggles increasingly became identified with the Guelph and Ghibelline alignments. The Uberti family formed the principal nucleus of the pro-Hohenstaufen faction, while their opponents gravitated towards the Guelph camp. These labels incorporated older familial, political and economic rivalries rather than representing simple obedience to either emperor or pope. By the mid-1240s, however, the wider conflict between Frederick II and the papacy increasingly intensified those local divisions.

From 1246 Florence had effectively been governed by Frederick's illegitimate son Frederick of Antioch, who exercised authority in Tuscany as imperial vicar and relied upon the Uberti and other Florentine Ghibellines. The Guelph faction was consequently excluded from political power. During the winter of 1247–1248 Cardinal Ottaviano degli Ubaldini, seeking to weaken the imperial position while Frederick concentrated his forces against Parma, opened contacts with the Florentine Guelphs. Before this diplomatic activity could produce an organised change of regime, the Uberti and their allies decided to strike first.

== Battle ==
At the end of January 1248 the Uberti and their Ghibelline allies attacked the houses and fortified towers of their Guelph rivals. Fighting rapidly spread through Florence, whose dense concentration of aristocratic towers and fortified family compounds transformed the struggle into a series of violent street engagements. The Guelphs initially resisted successfully and for a time appeared capable of defeating their opponents.

The balance changed on 31 January when Frederick of Antioch hurried from nearby Prato, where he had been encamped, with a substantial body of German cavalry reinforced by troops summoned from other Tuscan communes. According to the chronicler fn the history of Florence, Giovanni Villani, he arrived with a mounted force of 1,600 men. The arrival of this professional and heavily armed imperial contingent gave the Ghibelline side a substantial military advantage and prevented the local conflict from turning against the Uberti.

The struggle nevertheless continued for another two days. Guelph aristocrats, artisans, merchants and other members of the Florentine populace maintained resistance within the city, indicating that the conflict extended beyond a narrow confrontation between noble families. On 2 February their position finally collapsed. The surviving Guelphs abandoned Florence and withdrew toward villages, castles and strongholds in the Apennines. Stürner likewise records the January 1248 expulsion of the rebellious papal faction from Florence by Frederick of Antioch, placing the action among the contemporary successes of the imperial party in Italy.

== Aftermath ==
The victory produced an immediate transformation of Florentine politics. Houses and towers belonging to defeated Guelph families were demolished, while Frederick of Antioch assumed enlarged powers within the city and further restricted the effective independence of the communal institutions. An imperial garrison of 800 German cavalry was established to secure the new regime and discourage another internal rising. News of the victory was rapidly communicated to Frederick II, who received it with satisfaction and had the success publicised among his supporters.

The battle temporarily established a firmly imperial-Ghibelline government in Florence at a moment when Frederick's wider Italian position was being subjected to intense pressure. Its significance extended beyond local factional warfare: Florence was one of the principal Tuscan communes, and its retention strengthened the Hohenstaufen position along the routes connecting northern Italy with Tuscany and the Kingdom of Sicily. The political settlement nevertheless depended heavily upon military force and the authority of Frederick of Antioch. The defeated Guelphs remained active outside the city and retained links with the wider papal coalition.

The result consequently formed one episode in the continuing oscillation of Florentine factional politics rather than a permanent settlement. By 1250 the political balance would again change as imperial authority in Tuscany came under renewed pressure. Even so, the fighting of January and February 1248 represented one of the clearest demonstrations of the ability of Frederick's Tuscan vicariate to intervene directly and successfully in the internal politics of a major commune.

== Sources ==
- Abulafia, David (1988). Frederick II: A Medieval Emperor. London: Allen Lane. ISBN 9780713990041.
- Grillo, Paolo (2023). Federico II: La guerra, le città e l'Impero. Milan: Mondadori. ISBN 978-88-35-72312-7.
- Stürner, Wolfgang (2000). Friedrich II. Teil 2: Der Kaiser 1220–1250. Darmstadt: Primus Verlag. ISBN 978-3-534-12229-5.
