= Frederick of Hohenstaufen =

Frederick of Hohenstaufen or Frederick of Staufen (German: Friedrich von Staufen; Italian: Federico di Svevia) may refer to:

- Frederick I, Duke of Swabia
- Frederick I, Holy Roman Emperor
- Frederick II, Duke of Swabia
- Frederick II, Holy Roman Emperor
- Frederick IV, Duke of Swabia
- Frederick V, Duke of Swabia
- Frederick VI, Duke of Swabia
- Frederick of Antioch
- Frederick of Pettorano
