= Frederick of Antioch =

Italian nobleman

Frederick of Antioch (c. 1223 – 1255/6) was an Italian nobleman who served as the imperial vicar of Tuscany from 1246 to 1250. He was an illegitimate son of Frederick II, Holy Roman Emperor, by an unidentified southern Italian noblewoman. He took part in the wars of the Guelphs and Ghibellines in northern Italy, and in the war over the Kingdom of Sicily following his father's death (1250).

== Biography ==
=== Early life ===
Frederick was the illegitimate son of the Emperor Frederick II and a certain Matilda (Maria) of Antioch, daughter of Robert of Antioch. Contemporary anti-imperial propaganda alleged that Frederick was the product of the emperor's liaison with a Muslim woman in Palestine, but it is almost certain that the child was born in southern Italy, where he spent his youth. The claim that he was a son of Plaisance of Antioch, daughter of the reigning Prince Bohemond V, is unfounded, as is the later claim that his mother's name was Beatrice (Beatrix). Like most of his father's illegitimate children, Frederick was probably born during the period when his father was unmarried (1222–1224). At least one illegitimate half-brother of Frederick's shared his name, Frederick of Pettorano, born about eleven years earlier.

Between 1236 and 1245, Frederick married Margherita Conti di Poli. As their eldest son, Conrad, was married to Beatrice Lancia in 1258, it is probable that he was born around 1240 and that his parents' marriage pre-dates that. Margherita was the daughter of a Roman nobleman, Giovanni Conti, lord of Poli and at various times a senator of Rome. Besides Poli, he held allodial and feudal land at Anticoli Corrado, Arsoli, Camerata Nuova, Guadagnolo, Roviano and Saracinesco. Giovanni was among Frederick II's followers in Rome in 1229–30, and was rewarded with the county of Albe, which was nearer his other properties, in exchange for that of Fondi. Through his marriage Frederick came to possess important castles and rights along the Via Valeria, an ancient route connecting the Kingdom of Sicily and the Papal States.

Although Frederick has been ascribed up to eight children, only two, perhaps three, can be identified from primary documents. His son, Conrad, was alive as late as 1301. His daughter Philippa, born around 1242, married Manfredi Maletta, the grand chamberlain of Manfredi Lancia, in 1258. She was imprisoned by Charles of Anjou and died in prison in 1273. Maria, wife of Barnabò Malaspina, may also have been his daughter.

=== Imperial vicar in Tuscany ===
As he did with his other illegitimate offspring, the emperor employed Frederick in various administrative and military functions from a young age. Frederick's ambit was central Italy, and he was appointed imperial vicar general in the March of Ancona in late 1244 or early 1245, when he could not have been much more than twenty years old. After a brief stint at Pontenure with the army of his half-brother Enzo, he was knighted by his father in July 1245 by a Cremona. Between February 1246 and November 1248 he was vicar general in the March of Tuscany and the Papal territory in Tuscany: "in Tuscany from Amelia to Corneto and for all the coast", probably as far south as Ostia. Thereafter until the end of 1250 his vicariate was limited to Tuscany and excluded the Papal territory, which was placed under the vicar Galvano Lancia, father-in-law of Frederick's son Conrad.

Frederick's rule in Tuscany was heavy-handed, but effective. He conscripted soldiers—including Bolognese students and merchants of the Guelph party—and levied taxes from all the cities of Tuscany, most notably Siena, to which he temporarily transferred the silver mines of Montieri as partial compensation for his exactions. In Florence, the chief city of Tuscany, internal conflict between the Guelph and Ghibelline parties allowed the emperor to install Frederick as imperial podestà there (February 1246). His appointment was understood by Vita da Cortona, the biographer of Florentine holy woman Umiliana de' Cerchi, as a fulfillment of her prophecy about the coming of a tyrant. Umilian herself died shortly after Frederick's arrival in the city. Initially, Frederick attempted to reconcile the two parties, but in the end resorted to removing the Guelph capitani del popolo and in early 1248 had the city exile the Guelph leaders and destroy their homes. While he was away on his frequent military campaigns, Frederick delegated his podesteria to vicars.

During his government of Tuscany, Frederick was constantly on the move. He can be shown to have visited staunchly loyal Siena, as well as the traditionally Ghibelline towns of Arezzo, Borgo San Genesio, Fucecchio, Poggibonsi, Prato, San Miniato and San Quirico d'Orcia. His military campaigns took him to Orbetello and Magliano in November–December 1246, to Castiglione del Lago and Perugia in May–June 1247, to the county of Orvieto in the autumn of 1247, to the Lunigiana some time between the summers of 1246 and 1247 and as far as Umbria and the Maremma between the summer of 1249 and spring of 1250.

In March 1247 Frederick met his father in Siena while the latter was on his way to Lyon to meet Pope Innocent IV. A general uprising diverted the emperor, and Frederick went north in August to join the siege of Parma. This was the only time during his vicariate that he ventured north of the Apennines. At Parma he met his half-brother Enzo and his father's other loyal supporters—Manfredi Lancia, Oberto Pelavicino, Ezzelino da Romano, Pietro Ruffo and Taddeo da Sessa. At Parma he was also formally enfeoffed as count of Albe, his father-in-law's old benefice. He had to return swiftly to Florence, however, to prevent it from falling under the control of the Papal legate Ottaviano degli Ubaldini.

After defeating the Florentine uprising in the summer of 1247, the loyalty of even the Ghibelline centres was pragmatic rather than ideological. A second Florentine rebellion in the summer of 1250 defeated his troops near the loyal town of Figline. Frederick's representatives were chased from the city and a new government, called the Primo Popolo (First People), was instituted in Florence. When Emperor Frederick II died on 13 December 1250, although Frederick and Galvano Lancia learned of his death within a week (between 18 and 20 December), most of the imperial officials in Tuscany abandoned their posts. His administration having collapsed, Frederick nonetheless remained in Tuscany until the autumn (1251).

=== Count in the kingdom of Sicily ===
By February 1252, Frederick had joined his half-brother and father's heir, Conrad IV, in southern Italy. At a meeting of the court in Foggia, Conrad confirmed Frederick's possession of the county of Albe and conferred on him those of Celano and Loreto Aprutino. Together Albe and Celano had once formed the county of the Marsi. Neither of these new acquisitions, however, were in Conrad's hands at the time. In 1247, Pope Innocent had restored Count Thomas of Celano and his son Roger to the lands the emperor had confiscated from them, and after the latter's death in 1250 they re-occupied them. Loreto Aprutino had been bestowed by the emperor on Count Thomas II of Aquino, but the latter went over to the Guelf side after Pope Innocent confirmed his possessions in June 1251. At Foggia, Conrad declared Loreto forfeit and transferred it to Frederick. Beginning in the summer of 1252, Frederick, with the help of Gualtiero di Manoppello, re-conquered the counties of Loreto and Celano. The castle of Loreto was the last fortress to fall (1253).

Conrad increasingly distrusted Frederick because of the latter's strong connections to the Lancia family: his son was married to Beatrice, whose father Galvano was long associated with Frederick in Tuscany. In 1253, perhaps fearing a Lancia coup to seize the Kingdom of Sicily, Conrad stripped his illegitimate half-brother Manfredi Lancia of all his fiefs save the Principality of Taranto. Frederick and Galvano hired two Genoese ships at Tropea and embarked with their retinues to leave the kingdom.

In July 1254, Pope Innocent summoned Manfredi, Frederick and the Count of Hohenberg to a council at Anagni. On 8 September the pope excommunicated them for not handing over Sicily to papal officers and confiscated their fiefs. In September a treaty was signed giving the Pope authority in Apulia, but in October, while accompanying Innocent into his new domains, Manfredi and Frederick escaped. With the aid of the local Saracen settlers they took control of Lucera on 2 November. On 12 November, Innocent, referring to Frederick as "our faithful man" (fidelis noster), restored to him the counties of Albe, Celano and Loreto. It is possible that Frederick had entered into negotiations with the pope on his own initiative, but it is more likely that Innocent intended to coax him away from Manfredi, as he had already successfully done with Galvano.

After the death of Innocent and the election of Alexander IV in 1255, Frederick re-joined Manfredi in the south. He fought against the papal troops led by Ottaviano degli Ubaldini and the Count of Hohenberg, Berthold, now gone over to the papal side. In August he joined the siege of Foggia. An epidemic swept the camps of both armies in late 1255 or early 1256 and Frederick was among the victims. He was almost certainly dead when Manfredi held court at Barletta in February and handed out rewards to the men who had helped him re-conquer the kingdom.

== "King" Frederick ==
Although he was never formally installed as King of Tuscany, several documents pertaining to the Tuscan communes refer to him as "lord king" (dominus rex), "Lord Frederick, son of the emperor, and King" (dominus Federighus filius domini imperatoris et rex) or "King Frederick" (re Federigo).

Four Tuscan poems variously ascribed to the emperor and to "King Frederick" (rex Fredericus) may have been written by Frederick of Antioch. Although the evidence is slim, several lines of one poem seem to have been penned by a person with intimate knowledge of Tuscany. Frederick was also the patron of Orfinus of Lodi, a judge who composed a 1,600-line poem, De regimine et sapientia potestatis, on the office of podestà.
