= Battle of Civitanova =

Battle in 1248 in Italy

- Part of War of the Guelphs and Ghibellines
Date	April 1248
Location	Near Civitanova Marche, March of Ancona, Italy
Result	Imperial victory

Belligerents
Holy Roman Empire; Kingdom of Sicily; Marchesan Ghibellines; Osimo, Macerata, Jesi, Senigallia and allied contingents	Papal States; Marchesan Guelphs; Ancona, Camerino and Recanati

Commanders and leaders
Richard of Chieti	Hugo Novellus

Strength
4,000–6,000; Imperial and local Ghibelline cavalry and infantry, including Luceran Saracen troops	4,000–5,000; Papal troops and communal contingents from Ancona, Camerino and Recanati

Casualties and losses
500–800 killed and wounded	1,000–2,000 killed, wounded or captured

The Battle of Civitanova was fought in April 1248 near Civitanova Marche, in the March of Ancona, during the War of the Guelphs and Ghibellines. Imperial forces under Richard of Chieti, an illegitimate son of Emperor Frederick II and his vicar in the Marches, defeated a papal army commanded by Hugo Novellus. The victory checked, at least temporarily, the advance of the papal party in central Italy following the imperial defeat at Parma. It formed part of the continuing struggle between Frederick II and Pope Innocent IV for control of the Papal-Imperial frontier in the Marches and the Duchy of Spoleto.

== Background ==
The imperial position in Italy had entered a difficult period after the destruction of Frederick's camp at Vittoria in February 1248. The defeat encouraged anti-imperial forces throughout northern and central Italy, while Innocent IV intensified efforts to detach cities and nobles from Frederick's allegiance. The March of Ancona was especially important because it lay between the northern Italian war zone and the Kingdom of Sicily, while its communes were divided between papal and imperial sympathies.

Frederick attempted to govern these territories through members of his family and trusted officials. Richard of Chieti was one of the emperor's illegitimate sons entrusted with regional authority, serving as imperial vicar in the Marches while Frederick of Antioch held a comparable position in Tuscany. In the spring of 1248 papal forces under Hugo Novellus operated in the region together with former imperial officials who had defected to the papal side, including Pandolfo di Fasanella and Giacomo di Morra.

== Battle ==
In April 1248 the opposing forces met near Civitanova, south of Ancona. The surviving narrative evidence is sparse, but Stürner records that Richard of Chieti defeated the papal army commanded by Hugo Novellus, who was accompanied by Pandolfo di Fasanella and Giacomo di Morra. Richard's force drew upon the imperial military network of the Marches, which combined royal troops with contingents supplied by communes and local Ghibelline supporters under the authority of the imperial vicariate. Grillo's account of Frederick's administrative system emphasizes that the regional vicars were expected to coordinate military operations and supervise the political conduct of the communes within their districts.

The engagement ended in an imperial victory. The papal army was driven from the field and suffered substantially greater losses than Richard's force. The battle temporarily restored imperial momentum in the Marches and allowed Richard to recover ground lost during the political reaction that followed Parma. Although later papal advances prevented Civitanova from producing a permanent territorial settlement, the victory demonstrated that Frederick's military organization in central Italy remained capable of mounting effective counterstrokes despite the reverses of early 1248.

== Aftermath ==
Civitanova provided Frederick with an important local success at a moment when the wider imperial position was under severe pressure. It did not, however, end the struggle for the Marches. During the following months Cardinal Raniero Capocci achieved further gains for the papacy in both the March of Ancona and the Duchy of Spoleto, while several communes shifted toward the papal camp. 1248 was a year of alternating gains and losses in which Innocent IV concentrated increasing attention on central and southern Italy. The victory at Civitanova nevertheless showed the continuing resilience of Frederick's forces after Parma and preserved an imperial military presence in the central Adriatic region.

== Sources ==
- Abulafia, David (1988). Frederick II: A Medieval Emperor. London: Allen Lane. ISBN 978-0-7139-9004-1.
- Grillo, Paolo (2023). Federico II: La guerra, le città e l'Impero. Milan: Mondadori. ISBN 978-88-04-76912-5.
- Stürner, Wolfgang (2000). Friedrich II. Teil 2: Der Kaiser 1220–1250. Darmstadt: Primus Verlag. ISBN 3-89678-025-5.
