= Manfred II Lancia =

Manfred II (Italian: Manfredo or Manfredi) Lancia or Lança (c. 1190–Asti, c. 1257), was the eldest son of Manfred I and nominally margrave of Busca. He became an Imperial Vicar and a faithful follower of Frederick II.

== Life ==
Nothing is known of Mainfredus Lancia before 1215, when he is recorded as assistant and advisor to Manfred, margrave of Saluzzo. The following year he is recorded as Frederick II's representative in Piedmont and is a party to a number of charters in the period to 1219.

He is next seen in Frederick's court in Sarzana in 1226, and there are frequent references to him in the court records over the next six years. At this time Frederick's relationship with his mistress Bianca Lancia, Manfred's niece, resulted in the birth of Constance and Manfred, later King of Sicily.

He followed Frederick II against rebels in Sicily in 1233 and then Lazio, and was probably on his 1235 expedition to Germany, following which he was commissioned to escort the emperor's rebellious son and king of the Romans, Henry, to Apulia.

In early 1238, Manfredo was appointed Imperial Vicar a Papia superius, an area covering Piedmont and Liguria. He served as governor (podestà) of Alessandria for many years, alternating between diplomatic assignments and military tasks, usually aimed at restoring imperial authority over the townships that attempted to rebel (Alessandria, Vercelli, Brescia, Piacenza, Crema, Milan), but otherwise aimed at consolidating his control over his family's feudal lands in southern Piedmont.

Having successfully subdued one sector, his imperial supervision was transferred to a Papia inferius based as governor of Cremona. In 1241 he led expeditions against Brescia and Piacenza, Milan and Crema. From mid 1242 he is no longer associated with Cremona but in a full-time role as lieutenant to the young king Enzo.

In the summer of 1245, Pope Innocent IV excommunicated Manfred, along with Frederick II and Enzo. In 1246 he, together with Enzo, repressed an uprising in Parma. Two years later, a sudden switch by Parma to the Guelph faction led to a siege by the imperial forces, led by Frederick II, who based his troops in a military encampment outside the city which he named, somewhat unfortunately, Vittoria. In January 1248, in the emperor's absence, he was entrusted with the defence of Vittoria, and nearly lost his life in a raid by the Parmigianans on the camp. The Parma siege had failed, but Manfred was not blamed by the emperor.

Later that year he was part of a negotiating team in Vercelli arranging the marriage of Beatrice of Savoy and Manfred, son of the emperor. Here he is referred to as dialectis affines noster and was appointed imperial captain a Papia usque Astam. From 1249 the emperor also gave him the task of legate to the territories above the Lambro with a base as governor of Lodi.

For a brief period at the and of Frederick's reign he had the right to mint coinage "to demonstrate sovereignty", as evidenced by some small and larger coins that have survived.

When the Frederick withdrew to southern Italy in December 1249, Manfred was one of two imperial leaders left to defend the empire. Frederick died on 19 December 1250, Manfred escaped from the Guelphs of Lodi and moved to Piedmont. On Conrad IV's, arrival in Italy as Frederick's legitimate heir, Manfred tried to establish a relationship with the new emperor, but Oberto Pelavicino was preferred. This, and the harsh treatment that the emperor dealt out to the Lanza family in Sicily, led him at the end of 1252 to switch over to the Guelph party. Thus, on 1 January 1253, he accepted the position of mayor and commander in chief of the Municipality of Milan, and subsequently that of Novara, whilst still holding Alessandria.

When Conrad IV died in May 1254, Manfred made plans for a military campaign on behalf of his nephew, Manfred of Sicily, but it came to nothing. In the following year, during the conflict between Asti and Thomas I, Count of Savoy, he led the army of Chieri. He lost control of Alessandria in 1257 and he was engaged battle with the forces of Pavia, Alessandria and the margrave of Monferrato that September. He was probably mortally wounded during this clash, as his name is not found in any further. (In August 1259, Isolda is referred to as the daughter of the late margrave of Lancia).

== Reputation ==
The troubadour Hugh de Saint Circq refers to Manfred's poor sociability and his bad appearance. He is said to "badly welcome and speak and shout, and badly eat and drink and give, and badly live, and makes ugly and bad expressions ..."

Mal acoill e parla e sona

E mal manja e beu e dona

E mal viu

E fai croi senblan chaitiu,

Et ab neguna gent bona

No s'atrai ni no s'adona,

Et esquiu

Lo trobaretz e pensiu!

E cel que ve sa persona

E la garda e la faissona,

Ni s'i pliu,

Tot son afar desazona.

— Uc de Saint Circ, Tant es de paubra acoindansa

Saint Circq presented himself at the court of Manfred, probably in Milan c. 1254, to do him honour and flatter him with elegant sayings. Manfred, perhaps more inclined to fighting and politics than poetry, clearly didn't appreciate him, but the troubadour had the last word.

== Descendants ==
It is thought that his children were:

- Oberto Lanza, recorded in Piedmont in 1256
- Isolda (Isotta), wife of Bertoldo of Hohenburg, Manfred of Sicily's guardian
- another Manfredi (III) present in the kingdom from 1251
- possibly Beatrice, Abbess of Santa Maria di Messina from 1250 to 1263.

It seems likely that Galvanus and Frederick (the eldest adult from at least 1240) were his brother's sons, though "connections remain very difficult to establish".
