= Siege of Brescia (1238) =

Siege in 1238 in Italy

- Part of the Wars of the Guelphs and Ghibellines
Date	11 July – 9 October 1238
Location	Brescia, Lombardy, present-day Italy
Result	Guelph victory: Imperial withdrawal; Brescia successfully resists the siege

Belligerents
Holy Roman Empire; Kingdom of Sicily; Ghibelline cities Cremona, Pavia, Parma, Reggio Emilia, Modena, Bergamo, Verona, Vercelli, Novara, Tortona, Asti and Treviso: Kingdom of England; County of Toulouse; County of Provence; Empire of Nicaea	Lombard League: Brescian Guelphs

Commanders and leaders
Frederick II; Manfred Lancia; Ezzelino da Romano	Oberto de Iniquitate

Strength
20,000-22,000: 3,000–4,000 German knights and other imperial troops; 3,000–4,000 troops from the Kingdom of Sicily; 6,000–7,000 Luceran Saracen archers; 4,000–5,000 Lombard, Venetian, Tuscan, Marche and Romagnol troops; 1,000 French, Provençal and Languedoc troops; 100 English knights; 500–1,000 Nicaean troops; 100–300 North African Muslim light cavalry	6,000–8,000: 4,000–5,000 civic infantry and militia; 1,000–1,500 cavalry, crossbowmen and specialist troops; 1,000–1,500 armed townspeople and auxiliary defenders

Casualties and losses
500–1,000 killed, wounded or captured	200–500 killed, wounded or captured

The Siege of Brescia was fought from July to October 1238 during the renewed conflict between Frederick II and the Lombard League. Following his great victory at the Battle of Cortenuova, Frederick sought to break the remaining resistance in northern Italy and assembled a large multinational army for a campaign ultimately directed against Milan. Brescia, positioned between the emperor's eastern Lombard allies and Milan, became the immediate objective of the offensive. Despite Frederick's numerical superiority, repeated assaults, siege machinery and attempts at negotiation failed to overcome the city's defenses. The siege ended with an imperial withdrawal in October, giving the Guelph coalition an important defensive victory and marking a major check to Frederick's post-Cortenuova momentum.

== Background ==
The siege of Brescia was part of Frederick II's renewed broader campaign against the Lombard League after his crushing victory at the Battle of Cortenuova in November 1237. Although the League army had suffered extremely heavy losses, the victory had failed to eliminate the principal centres of resistance. Brescia remained in rebel hands, while Milan, Piacenza and other communes continued to oppose the emperor. During the first months of 1238 Frederick concentrated almost all the military resources available to him for what was intended to be a decisive campaign against the remaining Lombard opposition.

Frederick planned a large pincer movement against Milan. The emperor was to advance from the east, while his vicar Manfred Lancia assembled a western army around Pavia and Piedmont. The imperial host was reinforced by German knights, troops from the Kingdom of Sicily, contingents from loyal Italian communes, and foreign forces from England, France, Provence, the eastern Mediterranean and elsewhere. This considerable international army reflected the emperor’s immense prestige and status on the wider European stage after the victory at Cortenuova. Frederick faced an obstacle before he could move against Milan. Brescia occupied a strategically important position between Frederick's eastern Lombard allies and Milan, making its submission a prerequisite for the intended advance.

Brescia prepared systematically for resistance. Early in 1238 it appointed the Piacentine Oberto dell'Iniquità as podestà, reaffirming its alliance with Milan. Palisades, earthworks and other structures reinforced the walls and ditch. On 14 June Oberto received extraordinary powers to expel suspected imperial sympathisers; at least one hundred members of prominent Brescian families were driven from the city and their towers and houses demolished. The commune also recruited engineers and specialists capable of strengthening the fortifications and constructing siege artillery.

== Siege ==
On 11 July 1238 the imperial army appeared before Brescia and established its camp southwest of the city, between the walls and the Mella. Frederick initially hoped that the size and international composition of his army would induce the commune to surrender without a costly assault. Imperial forces therefore devastated the surrounding countryside, captured castles and received the submission of several fortresses. Among those taken prisoner was the jurist Albertanus of Brescia. Brescia, however, had deliberately retained almost all of its military forces behind the city walls and refused to capitulate.

The failure of this strategy forced Frederick into a prolonged siege for which his campaign had not originally been designed. The city's large population provided thousands of potential defenders, while craftsmen, engineers and builders could repair damaged fortifications and construct counter-artillery. Moreover, the summer harvest had already been brought within the walls, giving the inhabitants substantial food reserves. By August Frederick abandoned the planned pincer operation against Milan and ordered Manfred Lancia to transfer the cavalry of the western army to Brescia.

The Lombard allies attempted to relieve the city indirectly. During the night of 24–25 August a Piacentine force of infantry, crossbowmen and cavalry crossed the Po and raided the Cremonese countryside, threatening the principal logistical base of the imperial army. Near Busseto the returning column encountered approximately 200 French and Provençal cavalry travelling east to join Frederick. The Piacentines were defeated, losing 90 cavalrymen and 300 infantrymen as prisoners, while five transalpine knights were captured. This was the only significant field engagement of the siege; most fighting around Brescia consisted instead of imperial raids and repeated sorties by the defenders.

During August the imperial army constructed mangonels, large trebuchets, battering rams and protected mobile shelters. The enormous encampment itself became an increasing liability. Grillo estimates the army at approximately 20,000 men, with perhaps a comparable number of horses and other animals requiring food and supplies. By September the stores accumulated for the campaign were being rapidly consumed.

An assault in early September failed. Frederick had Brescian prisoners captured during the previous year's campaign bound to mobile siege structures in an attempt to discourage the defenders from firing. The engineer Calamandrino, formerly attached to Ezzelino III da Romano's contingent before his capture and defection to Brescia, directed the city's artillery against the imperial machinery. The Brescians retaliated by displaying imperial prisoners on the walls, and the attack was abandoned. Frederick then attempted negotiation through the Parmese politician Bernardo di Rolando Rossi, but the Brescian council rejected his offer and continued the resistance.

Further attacks followed in late September and early October. A storm damaged the wooden defensive structures above the Brescian walls, but an attempted imperial assault was rapidly repulsed. On 7 October the Bergamese contingent employed a large mobile engineering device known as a porca to begin filling the city ditch. The defenders answered with a night sortie. A later Brescian tradition claimed that the attackers penetrated deeply into the imperial camp and almost captured Frederick himself. Brescian sources probably exaggerated this element but that the operation did succeed in destroying the porca and marked a significant recovery of the initiative by the defenders.

== Aftermath ==
On 9 October Frederick abandoned the siege, ordered the imperial camp and siege machinery burned, and withdrew toward Cremona. By this point the army had become increasingly difficult to sustain. Its supplies were close to exhaustion, the troops were exhausted, bad autumn weather exposed the besiegers to worsening conditions, and disease had spread among the animals, killing both transport beasts and valuable warhorses. The losses suffered during the failed assaults and Brescian sorties themselves were heavy. One later Sienese source records that five of the twenty-five knights sent by Siena, one fifth of the contingent, died during the campaign.

Once Frederick reached Cremona, most of the army was dismissed. The contingents of Parma, Reggio, Bergamo and Verona returned home, while nobles and ecclesiastics from France, England and Germany departed for their respective territories. Frederick retained his German cavalry and moved through Parma and Padua in an effort to reinforce imperial authority in areas whose loyalty had become less certain after the failure at Brescia. The result had significance beyond the survival of a single commune. The siege was an abrupt end of the sequence of imperial successes that had followed Cortenuova. Frederick had concentrated superior military resources against the city and nevertheless failed to compel its surrender. The episode consequently encouraged the Lombard communes to avoid major open-field engagements, where Frederick's combined cavalry, infantry and missile forces had demonstrated their superiority, and instead to exploit the formidable defensive potential of their fortified cities.

The failure also damaged the political effect of Cortenuova. News of the withdrawal circulated through Italy and across Europe through the nobles who had participated in the expedition. Frederick attempted in December to present the campaign as successful devastation of rebel territory rather than a failed attempt to capture Brescia, arguing that his forces had ravaged the countryside and forced their enemies behind their walls. Contemporary observers were less easily convinced. Even the generally imperial-friendly chronicler Richard of San Germano could only record that Frederick had devastated the Brescian territory before abandoning the siege and dissolving his army. Some imperial allies had become more cautious, and Frederick immediately moved through Parma and Padua to reinforce loyalty in strategically important areas, suggesting that he recognised a degree of political hesitation following the withdrawal. The aura of supposed near-invincibility that had built up around Frederick II after his staggering achievements over the past decade was dented.

Brescia represented an important defensive success for the Lombard opposition, but certainly not a total imperial disaster. It did not destroy Frederick's military position in northern Italy, nor did it overturn the overall balance of power. Indeed, in the short term, the overall situation still appeared far from unfavourable to the emperor: imperial power in northeastern Italy under Ezzelino da Romano remained secure, while the subsequent marriage the emperor’s illegitimate son Enzo to Adelasia of Sardinia opened a new avenue for extending Hohenstaufen influence in the western Mediterranean. However, what had changed was the political psychology of the war. The siege demonstrated that the communes could withstand even a very large imperial army by combining fortified urban defence, active sorties, sophisticated inter-communal cooperation and tactical pressure on the enemy's logistical system. The siege was beginning of a more prolonged and indecisive phase of Frederick's conflict with the Lombard cities, in which costly sieges increasingly replaced the prospect of a single decisive battlefield victory. The war against the Lombard communes would continue for several more years until the emperor’s death, culminating in an existential struggle for power when Frederick and Pope Gregory IX joined in open warfare the following year.
