= Battle of Vittoria =

Battle of Vittoria may refer to:

- Battle of Vittoria (18 February 1248), part of the siege and battle of Parma
- Battle of Vitoria (21 June 1813), the British battle honour for which was spelled 'Vittoria'
