= Battle of Fossalta =

Battle in 1249 in Italy

- Part of Guelphs and Ghibellines
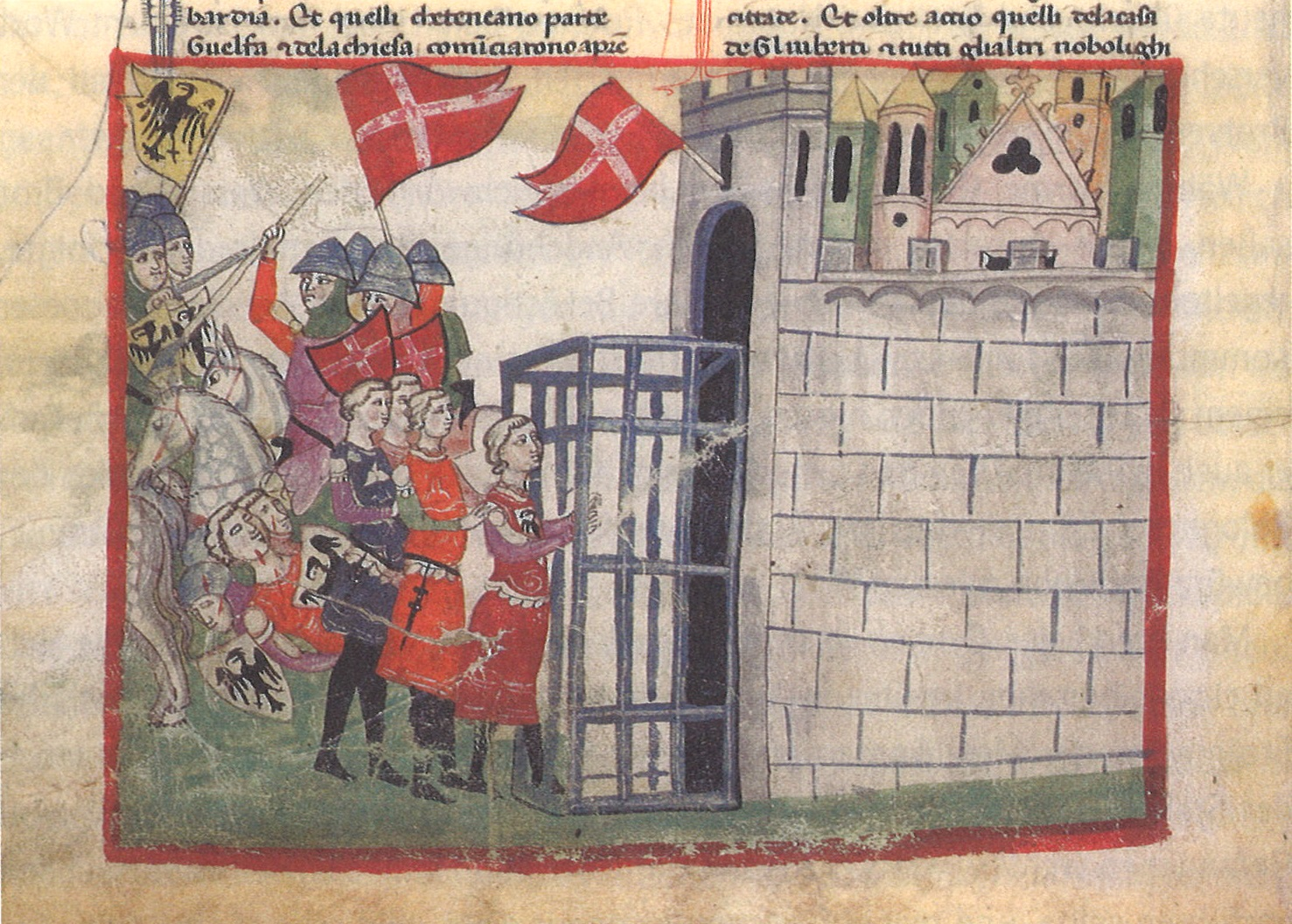
- Battle of Fossalta and King Enzo captured
Date	26 May 1249
Location	Fossalta stream near Modena
Result	Guelph victory

Belligerents
Holy Roman Empire; Kingdom of Sicily; Ghibelline cities Cremona and Modena	Bologna; Lombard League; Ferrara; Papacy

Commanders and leaders
Enzo of Sardinia (POW); Marino da Eboli (POW); Buoso da Dovara (POW); Richard of Chieti †	Filippo Ugoni; Azzo VII d'Este; Ottaviano degli Ubaldini

Strength
15,000	8,800

Casualties and losses
2,000-3,000 killed, wounded or captured	1,000 killed and wounded

The Battle of Fossalta was fought on 26 May 1249 between the forces of Bologna and its allies and an imperial army commanded by Enzo of Sardinia, son of Emperor Emperor Frederick II. It formed part of the prolonged struggle between the Guelphs and Ghibellines in northern and central Italy and occurred near Fossalta, between Modena and Bologna, during a major Bolognese offensive against the imperial cities of Modena and Reggio Emilia.

The battle ended in a clear Bolognese victory. Enzo attempted to prevent the Bolognese army from crossing the Panaro, but after they successfully forced the crossing his troops were attacked from the rear and compelled to retreat toward the swollen Tiepido stream at Fossalta. A renewed Bolognese attack during the difficult crossing threw the imperial army into disorder and produced a general rout. Approximately 2,000 imperial combatants were killed or captured, while the Bolognese pursued the defeated army as far as the gates of Modena.

The battle is principally remembered for the capture of Enzo, Frederick's general legate in northern Italy and one of his most important military representatives. His loss temporarily weakened the imperial command structure in Lombardy and contributed to a series of setbacks later in 1249, although it did not decide the wider war. Imperial power remained substantial, and during 1250 Oberto Pallavicino emerged as Enzo's effective successor as the leading imperial commander in Lombardy.

== Background ==
The battle developed from the continuing struggle for control of the central Po valley after the imperial defeat at Parma in February 1248. Frederick II had subsequently restored much of his position in northern Italy, and by early 1249 the situation again appeared sufficiently favourable for him to entrust much of the day-to-day conduct of operations to his sons and lieutenants. Enzo, Frederick's general legate in northern Italy, had operated successfully around Parma and Reggio and, according to Stürner, appeared by the beginning of 1249 to have the Lombard situation broadly under control. Enzo was an effective commander whose close cooperation with Ezzelino III da Romano and other imperial leaders made him an important element of Frederick's military system in northern Italy.

Bologna, however, had become one of the strongest centres of the anti-imperial coalition. It was the richest and most powerful city of the Po plain south of the river, with a population exceeding 50,000. Until 1248 much of its military effort had been directed eastward into Romagna, but the weakening of imperial power there allowed Bologna to turn west against Modena and Reggio. A major offensive was therefore organised in the spring of 1249. Its objectives were to attack Modena and Reggio, reduce the pressure they were exerting upon Guelph Parma, and strengthen pro-papal exiles, particularly those from Reggio. By mid-May Bologna mobilised its communal army, reinforced by anti-imperial Modenese exiles and a Romagnol contingent. The Bolognese force also drew upon contingents supplied by recently subordinated lords and communities of the surrounding countryside. Fortified centres such as Medicina provided mounted retainers and local noble families, including members of the Biancuzzi and other Cattani, served alongside the urban militia. The army was led by the Brescian Filippo Ugoni, with the wider anti-imperial coalition associated with Azzo VII d'Este and Cardinal Ottaviano degli Ubaldini.

The threat to Modena brought Enzo rapidly south from Cremona. He mobilised all the cavalry immediately available to him and joined the Modenese infantry. Older estimates give the opposing armies as approximately 15,000 imperial troops and 8,800 men on the Bolognese side.

== Battle ==
On 26 May the Bolognese army began crossing the Panaro on the branch then known as the Scoltenna, near the bridge of Sant'Ambrogio. Enzo, who had established himself at Modena, marched out to contest the crossing. His force included his personal following, a body of Tuscan cavalry under the imperial-royal official Marino da Eboli, Cremonese troops, and a substantial part of the Modenese army, both cavalry and infantry.

Enzo attempted to prevent the Bolognese from establishing themselves across the river. The manoeuvre failed. The Bolognese succeeded in completing the crossing and were able to threaten the imperial troops from the rear, forcing Enzo to abandon his initial position. His army withdrew toward the Tiepido, a smaller watercourse running through the locality of Fossalta. Heavy spring water had swollen the stream and made the retreat increasingly difficult. The Bolognese pressed the pursuit and attacked again while the imperial army was attempting to cross. The position proved disastrous for Enzo's troops. With the stream behind them and their line of retreat constricted, much of the imperial force became trapped and disorganised. The formation broke apart and the retreat became a general rout. The result was a comprehensive defeat of the imperial field force and approximately 2,000 imperial combatants were killed or captured. The pursuing Bolognese continued almost to the gates of Modena, causing further casualties and destruction along the route.

Enzo himself was taken prisoner during the collapse. A later fifteenth-century Bolognese account claimed that he had deliberately remained behind to cover the retreat of his troops, but the late date of this tradition makes its reliability uncertain. His capture seems to have occurred amid the general defeat rather than as an isolated incident. The battle was primarily between Modena and Bologna in which Enzo's opponents gained the upper hand and captured him together with many of his companions. The older narrative tradition presents the fighting as a prolonged and particularly bloody confrontation in which the opposing armies repeatedly attacked throughout the day. The precise tactical sequence of those accounts is difficult to verify, but the central features are consistent with the modern reconstruction: a contested Bolognese advance, an imperial withdrawal toward Fossalta, the disruption of Enzo's army at the waterways behind it, and a decisive Bolognese pursuit.

== Aftermath ==
Enzo's capture transformed an otherwise medium-sized engagement into an event of much greater political significance. without Enzo's presence, Fossalta might have remained one among the many engagements fought between imperial and anti-imperial cities during the long conflict. Enzo, however, had served for years as Frederick's principal representative in northern Italy. As Frederick’s general legate, he was perhaps his most active and capable commander in northern Italy, and had proved effective in maintaining valuable links with Ezzelino and the other imperial warlords. The prisoners were carried into Bologna. Enzo was eventually confined in the city's Palazzo Nuovo, subsequently known as the Palazzo Re Enzo, where he remained until his death in 1272. Bolognese records show the scale of the prisoner problem after Fossalta: thirteen separate prisons were prepared across the city, while the highest-ranking prisoners were held in the communal palace. Most captives were eventually released after payment of ransom, although nearly 300 poorer prisoners remained incarcerated for years and some died in captivity. Other prominent prisoners associated with the aftermath included Marino da Eboli, Buoso da Dovara, Corrado of Solimburgo and Antonino dell'Andito.

News of Enzo's capture spread rapidly across Europe. Frederick, then in the Kingdom of Sicily, responded publicly with defiance. In a letter to Modena he promised recovery and affected composure, while his chancery simultaneously demanded Enzo's release from Bologna. The emperor threatened the city with destruction comparable to that inflicted upon Milan by Frederick Barbarossa in 1162 and offered rewards if his son and the other prisoners were freed. Bologna refused. Frederick's continued to make threatening demands for his son’s liberation until his death later the next year, but the Bolognese held Enzo captive until his own death in 1272.

The military consequences were serious but temporary. Enzo's absence contributed to imperial setbacks during the remainder of 1249: pressure on Parma diminished, Como made peace with Milan, Pontremoli was lost, and in December Modena itself came to terms with Bologna. At the same time, imperial forces continued to win elsewhere. Ezzelino captured Este and other positions, Ravenna returned to imperial control, and Oberto Pallavicino increasingly assumed Enzo's former role as the dominant imperial commander in Lombardy. During 1250 Pallavicino again took the offensive and inflicted a severe defeat on Parma on 18 August. Fossalta deprived Frederick of an exceptionally important son and lieutenant. The emperor clearly felt Enzo’s loss deeply. Strategically, the defeat temporarily damaged his position in northern Italy, but it did not determine the wider imperial-papal struggle or destroy imperial power in Italy.

== Sources ==
- Abulafia, David (1988). Frederick II: A Medieval Emperor. London: Allen Lane. ISBN 978-0-7139-9004-1.
- Stürner, Wolfgang (2000). Friedrich II. Teil 2: Der Kaiser 1220–1250. Darmstadt: Primus Verlag. ISBN 3-89678-025-5.
- Pini, Antonio Ivan (1993). Campagne e villaggi dell'Emilia-Romagna nel Medioevo. Bologna: CLUEB.
- Roversi Monaco, Francesca (2014). "Fossalta". Federiciana. Rome: Istituto dell'Enciclopedia Italiana.
- "Enzio". Lexikon des Mittelalters. Vol. III. p. 2030.
