= Marino da Eboli (podestà) =

Marino da Eboli or Marinus of Eboli (died c. 1256) was an imperial functionary in Italy during the reign of the Emperor Frederick II.

Marino was born in the first decade of the 13th century into a noble family of Capuan origin. He studied grammar, rhetoric and theology, probably at the University of Naples.

Marino served successively as the podestà of Modena (1239), imperial vicar in the Romagna (1240) and imperial vicar in Lombardy (1241). In October 1242, assisted by an alliance of Ghibelline cities and by an imperial fleet under Ansaldo dei Mari, he waged war on the Republic of Genoa. While Oberto Pallavicino invaded Genoese territory from the east, Marino attacked from the north. After capturing two fortresses, he received a letter from Frederick II, urging him: "Continue therefore in the same path and thou wilt assuredly bring to a successful issue those royal services of ours which thou didst with honourable intention undertake, Success and Fortune will wait upon thy deeds, since thou art fighting with the guidance of wisdom in a fortunate cause."

Marino thereafter served successively as podestà of Pisa and vicar of the Duchy of Spoleto. In the latter capacity in 1246, he defeated in battle at Spello an attempt to conquer the duchy led by Cardinal Raniero Capocci. He served as podestà of Pavia and then of Reggio nell'Emilia until, in 1249, while serving under King Enzo of Sardinia, he was captured at the Battle of Fossalta. He was imprisoned in the New Palace in Bologna alongside the king.

After the death of Frederick II in 1250, Marino's family made peace with Pope Innocent IV and he was freed. In 1253, accused of conspiring against the regent, Manfred of Sicily, he was captured and blinded. He was imprisoned alongside his son Richard in the Castel del Monte, where he died around 1256.

== Bibliography ==
- Fallacara, Giuseppe; Occhinegro, Ubaldo (2015). "Castel del Monte, una ricerca continua e interdisciplinare: 2009–2015". Castel del Monte: inedite indagini scientifiche. Atti del primo Convegno interdisciplinare su Castel del Monte, 18–19 giugno 2015. Politecnico di Bari. pp. 17–57.
- D'Onofrio, Mario (2005). "Marino da Eboli". Federiciana: Enciclopedia fridericiana. Rome: Istituto dell'Enciclopedia Italiana.
- Kantorowicz, Ernst (1957) [1931]. Frederick the Second, 1194–1250. Translated by E. O. Lorimer. Frederick Ungar.
- Roversi Monaco, Francesca (2014). "'King of Bologna': The Captivity of Enzo, King of Sardinia, between History and Myth". Quaestiones Medii Aevi Novae. 19: 279–302.
- Van Cleve, Thomas C. (1972). The Emperor Frederick II of Hohenstaufen: Immutator Mundi. Clarendon Press.
