= Battle of Spello =

1246 imperial victory over papal forces near Spello

- Part of the Capaccio conspiracy and the Guelph–Ghibelline conflict
Date	Late March 1246
Location	Near Spello, Duchy of Spoleto
Result	Imperial victory

Belligerents
Holy Roman Empire; Imperial forces in Spoleto	Papal States; Forces from Perugia and Assisi

Commanders and leaders
Marino da Eboli	Raniero Capocci

Strength
2,000–4,000	2,000–3,500

Casualties and losses
Few hundred killed or wounded	1,000 killed, wounded or captured

The Battle of Spello was fought in late March 1246 near Spello in the Duchy of Spoleto, between imperial forces commanded by Marino da Eboli and papal troops led by Cardinal Raniero Capocci, including contingents from Perugia and Assisi. The engagement formed part of the wider crisis produced by the Capaccio conspiracy and ended in an imperial victory with substantial losses among the papal forces.

== Background ==
Following Pope Innocent IV's deposition of Frederick II at the First Council of Lyon in 1245, the papacy sought to weaken Hohenstaufen authority throughout Italy. In March 1246 the discovery of the Capaccio conspiracy created an opportunity for the papal party to exploit unrest in the emperor's domains. Capocci, one of Frederick's most determined opponents in central Italy, attempted to widen the crisis by mobilising troops from Perugia and Assisi against imperial positions in the Duchy of Spoleto.

== Battle ==
Capocci's force advanced into the Spoleto region, apparently aiming at Foligno and the surrounding imperial-held territory. Near Spello it encountered an imperial army commanded by Marino da Eboli, Frederick's general vicar in the duchy. The imperial troops defeated the papal contingent heavily, forcing its withdrawal and inflicting substantial casualties. the encounter was a complete imperial victory with serious losses on the papal side, while the imperial force retained control of the region.

== Aftermath ==
The defeat at Spello curtailed the most immediate attempt by the papal party in central Italy to exploit the Capaccio uprising militarily. No papal army subsequently advanced south through the area to support the rebels in the Kingdom of Sicily, leaving Frederick free to concentrate upon suppressing the conspiracy itself. The episode also demonstrated that, despite Frederick's deposition and the widening papal campaign against him, the imperial military and administrative apparatus in central Italy remained capable of responding rapidly and effectively to coordinated opposition.

== Sources ==
- Abulafia, David (1988). Frederick II: A Medieval Emperor. London: Allen Lane. ISBN 9780713990041.
- Grillo, Paolo (2023). Federico II: La guerra, le città e l'Impero. Milan: Mondadori. ISBN 978-88-04-76912-5.
- Stürner, Wolfgang (2000). Friedrich II. Teil 2: Der Kaiser 1220–1250. Darmstadt: Primus Verlag. ISBN 978-3-534-12229-5.
