= Marino da Eboli =

Marino da Eboli may refer to:

- Marino da Eboli (podestà) (died 1256)
- Marino Filomarino (died 1286), archbishop of Capua
