= Taddeo da Suessa =

Taddeo da Suessa (or da Sessa) (c. 1190/1200 – February 18, 1248) was an Italian jurist.

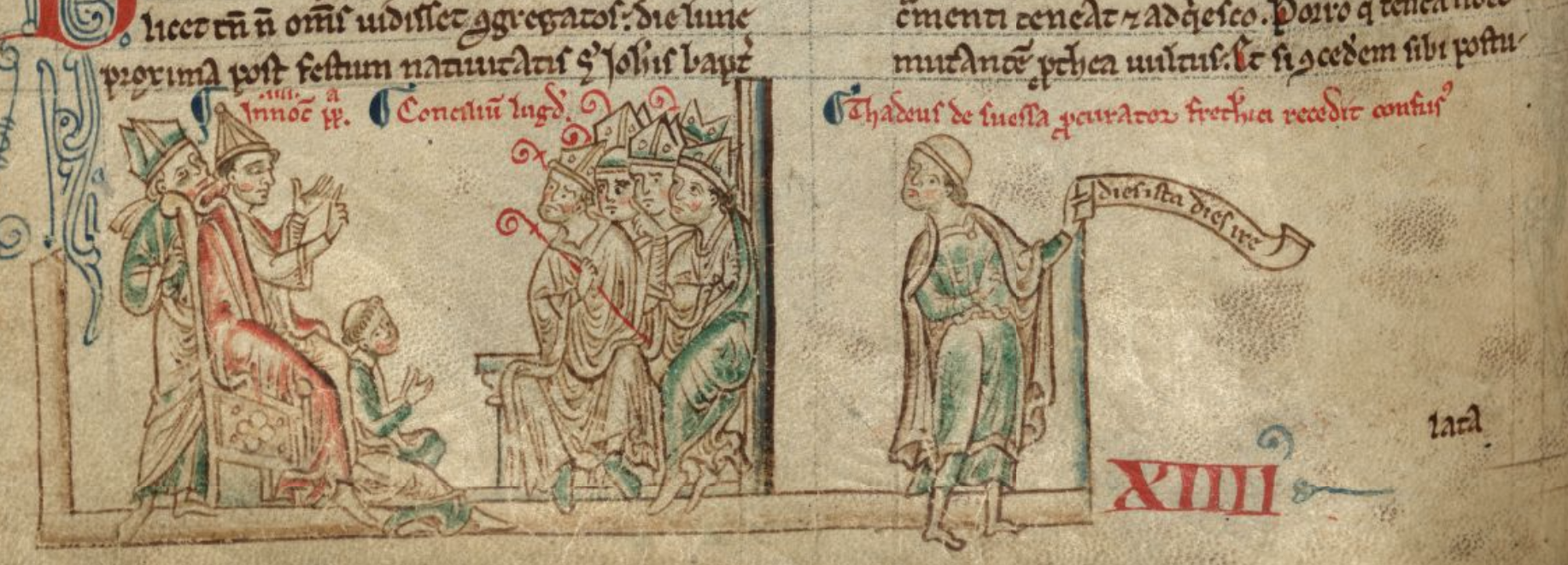
Taddeo taking leave of the council of Lyon holds a sign that reads Dies ista, dies irae ('This day is a day of wrath'). From a 13th-century copy of the Chronica maiora.

Born in Sessa Aurunca (modern Campania), he was introduced to Emperor Frederick II's court by Pier delle Vigne. Appointed as gran giustiziere (Great Justicier) of the Kingdom of Sicily, he became one of the main advisers to the emperor.

Taddeo and Pier were ambassadors to Pope Gregory IX and, after 1244, to Innocent IV. In 1245, Taddeo unsuccessfully defended the cause of the excommunicated emperor at the Council of Lyon against the accusations made against him by Innocent. According to Matthew of Paris's Chronica maiora, Taddeo responded to the deposition of the emperor by exclaiming, "from this time, heretics shall sing, the Khwarezmians shall reign, and the Tartars rise up."

He died at the Battle of Parma, killed during the Guelph assault against the imperial camp. Taddeo was captured, had his hands cut off, and was thrown into prison to die shortly later.
