= Frederick of Pettorano =

Frederick of Pettorano (c. 1212/3 – after 1240) was the eldest illegitimate son of Frederick II, Holy Roman Emperor. He was born in Sicily to an Italo-Norman noblewoman after his father's first marriage to Constance of Aragon. This mistress's name is unknown, but she came from a family of Norman counts in Sicily and had a relationship with the teenage Frederick between 1211 and 1212. Their relationship ended when King Frederick went to Germany and, in 1213, took up with another woman, a certain Adelaide. Besides Frederick of Pettorano, Frederick II probably named two other sons after himself: another illegitimate son, Frederick of Antioch, and a legitimate son by his wife Isabella. This last is known only by the initial "F." and died young.

Frederick does not seem to have been well-treated by his father. He received only the meagre castle of Pettorano in the Abruzzi, in the northern mainland of the Sicilian kingdom. Perhaps out of dissatisfaction, he seems to have become involved in plots against his father. Around 1240, he left Sicily with his family for the court of Ferdinand III of Castile, who had married his cousin, Elisabeth. He does not appear again in any surviving records.
