= Manfred I Lancia =

Manfred I (fl. 1160–1214), known as Manfredi Lancia, (Note: Alternative spellings are Manfredo and Lanza) was the second Margrave of Busca, famous for his financial difficulties (Note: Aldo Settia argues his constant need of money must be associated with a lavish aristocratic lifestyle, since Manfred is not recorded as going often to war, and the Montferrat court was a vibrant cultural scene.) and his Occitan poetry. He was the first person to adopt the surname Lanza or Lancia, giving rise to the Lanza family.

== Name ==
The reasons behind Manfred's adoption of the surname Lancia are unknown. Early commentators, like Iacopo d'Acqui and Antonio Astesano, believed it had been granted to him by the emperor, presumably Frederick I. It is more likely that he adopted it to distinguish himself from his contemporary and namesake, Manfred II of Saluzzo. The first recorded instance of the surname comes in a document dated 2 July 1210 at Turin, when Manfred met with the Emperor Otto IV.

== Life ==
=== Rule in Loreto ===
Manfred was born in the first half of the twelfth century, the second son of Guglielmo del Vasto, son of Bonifacio del Vasto of a branch of the Aleramici. He inherited the part of the county of Loreto between the Tanaro and the Belbo from his uncles Bonifacio di Cortemiglia and Ottone Boverio, dividing it with his elder brother, Berengar, and other relatives. Busca fell to Berengar, and Manfredi made his residence at the castle of Dogliani.

In 1160 Manfred and Berengar sold lands at Moretta, the earliest record of Manfred as an adult. In 1168 he sold land near Dogliani, the first signs of financial trouble, and on 30 August 1187 he sold Dogliani for 1,150 lire to Manfred of Saluzzo. In 1180 he sold his rights in Busca to the marquis of Saluzzo. He pawned his rights in the county of Loreto to the city of Alba for a loan of 1,033 lire genovesi in 1187. In 1191 he sold some woodland near Cortemiglia.

In 1192 Manfred joined the city of Asti in making war on Boniface I of Montferrat. In 1194 Asti blocked Manfred's efforts to sell his share of the county of Loreto to Boniface, a territory on which the commune had its sights. On 20 September 1195 at Dogliani, Manfred granted a tenth (tithe) of the income from all the tolls in his lands to the monastery of Santa Maria di Pogliola. On 30 October he received back all his rights in the castles of Neive and Barbaresco from two of his vassals of the Cortazzone family. This last charter is the first to link the Lancia with the Agliano; a certain "Brunus de Aglano" signed the charter as a witness. Although it cannot be shown with certainty, the Agliano, Laerio and Canelli families appear frequently in subsequent documents in ways that suggest they were all vassals of the Lancia.

=== Loss of Loreto ===
On 3 November 1196 at Dogliani, Manfred sold all his lands in Lombardia—save the towns of Bossolasco, Niella, Recisio and Boves—to Boniface of Montferrat for 3,000 ounces of gold. The contract of sale stipulated that Boniface would enfeoff Manfred with all the sold lands. It is not clear if the gold was actually paid, or if the contract was fictitious, since Manfred already owed Boniface a large sum. With this pact Boniface became master of the entire county of Loreto, contrary to the wishes of the city of Asti. In 1197 Manfred witnessed the oaths between Boniface and the citizens of Asti. A few days after that he witnessed the concession of an eighth of the county of Loreto to one citizen, standing as a guarantor for the latter. On 19 March 1197, he finally paid to the same citizen 700 ounces of gold for the 1,033 lire he owed as the buyback for his portion of the county of Loreto (pawned to Alba a decade earlier). This money was a gift from the Emperor Henry VI, although how Manfred came to have such a close relationship with the emperor (who died later that year) is unclear. Manfred had three other creditors to whom he had pawned the revenue of his part of Loreto. They were repaid by the gift of castles from Boniface, who thus exploited all of Manfred's debts to take control of the county of Loreto.

On 30 September 1197, Manfred reached an agreement with his vassals, whereby the latter would provide him with a one-time donation of 300 lire savonesi and an annuity of 50 lire. On 4 November, the 300 lire was reduced to 250. Three days later, while a guest of Boniface at Pontestura, Manfred got his new lord to confirm his right to collect a census in the county of Loreto and forbid its inhabitants from moving away without his permission.

=== Conflict with Asti ===
In 1198 the city of Asti, allied with those of Alessandria and Vercelli, invaded the county of Loreto. The allies quickly took the castle of Castagnole delle Lanze (so-named after Manfred's family), and took Manfred and many of his followers captive. The captives were distributed among the cities as booty. He was ransomed in exchange for the castle and territory of Costigliole, where Asti immediately began establishing their own village.

In 1201 city of Alba, under pressure from Asti, turned against the Aleramici and demanded a meeting of the marquises of Montferrat, Saluzzo and Busca in Alba to settle the debts of Manfred. On 4 June 1206 at Asti, Manfred, with Boniface's son and regent, William VI, was forced to cede Castagnole and the entire county of Loreto to Asti in exchange for 4,000 lire astigiani. The money was immediately paid to Manfred's Albesi creditors. Manfred and William then, in front of their vassals and peasants at Castagnole, formally renounced their authority to Asti.

=== Death and heirs ===
On 12 October 1212, Manfred gave Boves to the bishop of Asti and received it back as a heritable fief. The charter recording this transaction contains the only reference to Manfred's having multiple children, since the fief was to be held by Manfred and then by "his sons and daughters, those whom he had at that time he had, as well as his other future legitimate heirs" (eiusque filii et filie, quos et quas tunc habebat, sui aliique legiptimi heredes futuri). All these children must have been minors at the time to not have been named in either this charter or the later charters of 1213 and 1214 recording Manfred's possession of Boves.

On 5 May 1214, in his last surviving charter, Manfred gave his possessions in Beinette and Rossana to the bishop of Asti. Manfred died in 1214 or 1215, since by the end of the latter year his son, Manfred II (born 1185×95), his only child known for certain by name, had succeeded him. Jordan Lancia (Iordaninus de Lança), attested in documents from 1218, was probably also Manfred's son. His given name was common among the Agliano, who were Manfred's vassals. Bianca, who married Bonifacio d'Agliano and was the mother of Bianca Lancia and thus grandmother of King Manfred of Sicily, was probably a daughter. Manfred's wife, the mother of Manfred II, is not known by name and can only be assumed to have married her husband shortly before the birth of the eldest child, not much earlier than 1185 or later than 1195.

== Poetry ==
Composed around 1195–96, the two-stanza song Emperador aven de tal maneira, referred to merely as "coblas" in the chansonnier, is ascribed to a certain "Lanza marques", clearly Manfred, the only margrave named Lanza at the time, and to Peire Vidal, a famous troubadour of the time. It is a contrafactum of another piece by Vidal, Quant hom honratz. The song is a short sirventes, in which Vidal is mocked for his boasting song Quant hom es en autrui poder, in which he jokingly refers to himself as Emperaire dels Genoes (Emperor of the Genoese) because he was so well received by them. Peire responded with Lanza marqes, paubresa e nesceira, a cobla esparsa, also a sort of sirventes, accusing Manfred of always being always poor: plus sovens vens castels e domejos / No fai vellia gallinas ni capos. These two short pieces are sometimes grouped together and classified as a tenso.
