= Siege and battle of Parma =

Siege and battle in 1247–1248 in Italy

Battle of Parma
- Part of the Guelph–Ghibelline conflict
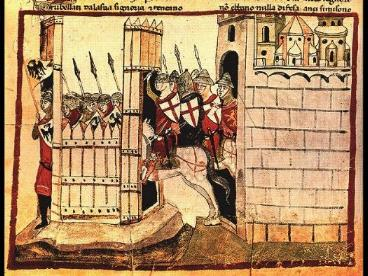
Date	June 1247 – 18 February 1248 (siege); 18 February
Location	Parma, Emilia-Romagna, Italy
Result	Guelph victory: Imperial blockade of Parma broken; Camp at Vittoria plundered and destroyed

Belligerents
Holy Roman Empire; Kingdom of Sicily; Ghibelline cities: Cremona; Modena; Reggio Emilia; Pavia; Imperial forces from northern and central Italy	Parma; Papacy; Guelph cities: Milan; Piacenza; Mantua; Ferrara; Genoa; Veronese and Reggian exiles

Commanders and leaders
Frederick II; Enzo of Sardinia; Ezzelino da Romano; Oberto Pallavicino; Frederick of Antioch; Manfred of Swabia; Manfred Lancia (POW); Taddeo da Sessa †	Gherardo da Correggio; Ugo Sanvitale; Gregorio di Montelongo; Guglielmo da Soresina; Ottone Marcellini; Rizzardo di San Bonifacio; Opizzo Malaspina

Strength
10,000–15,000 men: Imperial German and Sicilian cavalry; Luceran Saracen troops; Cremonese, Modenese, Reggian and other communal contingents; Tuscan troops; Only part of the imperial army remained at Vittoria on 18 February	8,000–9,000: 1,000 Parmese cavalry; 5,000–6,000 Parmese infantry; More than 2,000 allied troops

Casualties and losses
1,500 killed More than 2,000 captured: Imperial treasury, insignia and Cremonese carroccio captured	200–500 killed or wounded

The siege of Parma by the forces of Holy Roman Emperor Frederick II began in 1247 and ended with the battle of Parma or battle of Vittoria on 18 February 1248. The campaign formed part of the continuing struggle between Frederick and the Lombard League, increasingly intertwined with his conflict with Pope Innocent IV. Parma, previously one of the important pro-imperial communes of northern Italy, changed sides in June 1247 after a group of exiles and local opponents overthrew the city's imperial government.

Frederick, who was then preparing to move through Piedmont towards Lyon, immediately abandoned this project and marched against Parma. Rather than relying principally upon a direct assault, he attempted to isolate and starve the city into submission, while constructing the fortified camp-city of Vittoria close to its walls. On 18 February 1248, with Frederick temporarily absent and much of the imperial army dispersed, the Parmesans launched a large surprise attack. Vittoria was stormed, plundered and burned; several thousand imperial troops were killed or captured and much of Frederick's treasure, military equipment and administrative matériel was lost.

The defeat was a serious tactical, financial and prestige setback, but it did not destroy Frederick's army or his wider position. Most of his forces had escaped the destruction of Vittoria, and he resumed operations almost immediately. During 1248 he restored communications towards the Cisa Pass, deterred an offensive by Milan and Piacenza, recovered Vercelli, brought the Marquisate of Montferrat back into his allegiance and reorganized imperial power in northwestern Italy. By early 1249 his son Enzo was again operating successfully around Parma and Reggio. Frederick remained the preeminent ruler in Europe, and the war in Lombardy continued as a fluid and geographically fragmented conflict rather than having been decided at Parma.

== Background ==
The free commune of Parma had long been associated with the Ghibelline, or pro-imperial, party and constituted an important element of Frederick II's political and military system in northern Italy. Its significance was increased by its geographical position. Parma lay close to the principal communications linking the Po Valley to the Apennine Mountains and the Cisa Pass, one of the principal routes between Lombardy and Tuscany. Control of the city therefore affected the emperor's ability to move troops and communications between northern and central Italy. Its flourishing economy and position across important branches of the Via Francigena likewise made it attractive to Frederick's opponents.

The election of Innocent IV on 25 June 1243 strengthened the anti-imperial faction in Parma. Innocent had friends and relatives in the city and had previously held ecclesiastical offices connected with the local diocese. His elevation increased the importance of men such as Alberto Sanvitale, Ugo Sanvitale and Bernardo di Rolando Rossi, the pope's brother-in-law and a former collaborator of Frederick. Parma's internal political divisions subsequently deepened. Elements of the urban popolo and aristocratic opposition resented the imperial administration and the political predominance of Frederick's supporters. A substantial body of anti-imperial exiles gathered at Piacenza. On 15 or 16 June 1247, approximately 200–300 mounted exiles advanced towards Parma under Ugo Sanvitale. Near Borghetto on the Taro they encountered a hastily assembled force commanded by the imperial podestà Arrigo Testa. A fierce engagement followed in which Testa and several other imperial supporters were killed. The defeat of the government force triggered an uprising inside Parma. Gherardo da Correggio rallied the urban popolo, the anti-imperial exiles entered the city, and the surviving German troops negotiated their departure. On 16 June Gherardo da Correggio was elected podestà.

The rebellion occurred at a particularly consequential moment. Frederick had assembled his Lombard supporters at Cremona and was preparing to cross the Alps through Savoy to confront Innocent IV at Lyon. Failure to react to Parma would threaten Frederick's communications through the Cisa Pass and risked encouraging further defections among the Lombard communes. It would also have gravely weakened the position from which he intended to deal with the pope. Frederick therefore immediately abandoned the projected advance on Lyon, turned back towards Emilia and began operations against Parma on 2 July 1247.

== Siege ==
Both sides rapidly concentrated substantial forces in and around Parma. Gregorio di Montelongo, the experienced papal legate in Lombardy, reached the city and took command of the armies assembled there, while Gherardo da Correggio remained responsible for internal government. The defenders received extensive assistance from the anti-imperial communes. Rizzardo di San Bonifacio arrived with approximately 200 cavalry; Piacenza provided 300–400 milites under Obizzo Malaspina; approximately 100 Reggian exiles also joined the defence. Genoa sent 300 crossbowmen, while the Fieschi family recruited approximately another 300 from its Apennine possessions. Together the allied contingents numbered more than 2,000 experienced troops. Parma itself provided approximately 1,000 cavalry and perhaps 5,000–6,000 infantry.

The defences were organized systematically. Gregorio divided the perimeter into operational sectors. Rizzardo di San Bonifacio guarded the eastern approaches towards Reggio, the Piacentines watched the line of the Parma torrent, while the Milanese occupied positions to the south. The exposed suburb of Capo di Ponte, facing the main imperial concentration, was strengthened with a substantial palisade and ditch, behind which were stationed the Parmese cavalry and Genoese crossbowmen. Frederick arrived with his army on 2 July and established his principal position west of Parma. Enzo, accompanied by Ezzelino III da Romano and Oberto Pallavicino, operated across Emilia, while Reggio and Modena obstructed communications from the east. A Cremonese force led by Manfredi Lancia advanced through the Taro valley and occupied Medesano and Fornovo. Enzo and Pallavicino subsequently campaigned against the Malaspina and secured Pontremoli, helping preserve the imperial communications across the Cisa Pass.

Frederick's strategy centred upon reducing Parma through economic strangulation rather than storming its walls. The operation was, in important respects, an economic blockade rather than a conventional siege. The emperor concentrated the bulk of his army rather than dispersing it around the entire circumference of Parma and sent repeated expeditions into the surrounding countryside. Crops were destroyed, settlements damaged, livestock seized and communications attacked in an attempt to make the city impossible to provision. One substantial attempt was made against the urban defences. Imperial troops attacked the palisade around Capo di Ponte, using chains and grappling devices to tear sections of it down. The assault initially made progress, but concentrated fire from the defenders, particularly their crossbowmen, inflicted considerable losses and forced the attackers to withdraw. Thereafter Frederick returned principally to blockade, devastation and the interdiction of Parma's supply routes.

Imperial pressure became increasingly severe. Frederick refused exchanges of prisoners and ordered several captured Parmesans executed within sight of the walls. Food supplies declined sharply. Hunger became a regular feature of life inside Parma and deaths increased alarmingly, although Gregorio di Montelongo maintained the defenders' determination to resist. To sustain the campaign through the winter, Frederick constructed a fortified settlement southwest of Parma which he named Vittoria or Victoria ("victory"). It developed far beyond the dimensions of an ordinary field camp. It was a settlement protected by ramparts, ditches and other defensive works, crossed by canals and possessing eight gates, public spaces, shops, a mint and a church dedicated to Saint Victor. Its extraordinary scale impressed contemporary chroniclers. It simultaneously served as Frederick's military headquarters, administrative centre and a calculated symbol of imperial majesty and confidence in the expected submission of Parma.

Frederick reportedly announced that Parma would eventually be destroyed and Vittoria would replace it. The settlement was an embryonic imperial city laid out on a Romanizing plan, although contemporary descriptions probably exaggerated the extent to which its projected monumental buildings had actually been completed. It remained essentially a heavily organized military settlement built largely from timber rather than a permanent stone city. The blockade nevertheless never became completely impermeable. The imperial loss of a bridge at Brescello in late October improved Parma's northern supply position. In December both sides released substantial numbers of troops for the winter. Early in 1248, however, Enzo inflicted heavy losses upon a Mantuan-Ferrarese river force and began construction of another bridge across the Po. Combined with other imperial successes in central and northern Italy, these developments encouraged renewed confidence that Parma could soon be reduced.

== Battle of Vittoria ==
By February 1248 the disposition of the imperial army provided the defenders with an opportunity. A substantial proportion of Frederick's troops had been released for the winter, while many of those still present in the theatre were deployed northwards around the Po crossings. Parma's defenders could observe movements around Vittoria and were aware that the settlement was much less strongly manned than during the previous campaigning season. The traditional representation of the final sortie as merely a desperate eruption by starving inhabitants is probably false. More likely, it was a carefully prepared operation, probably planned in advance for a favourable moment.

At dawn on 18 February 1248 Frederick left Vittoria with an armed escort and a group of companions to hunt in the forests of the Taro valley. A body of Parmese cavalry then rode southwards, apparently threatening the emperor's party. Manfredi Lancia, who remained at Vittoria with part of the imperial cavalry, moved out to intercept them and forced the Parmesans to retire. The precise purpose of this first sortie is uncertain. It was possibly a deliberate feint intended to entice Lancia and the mobile imperial cavalry away from Vittoria. Gregorio di Montelongo then ordered a general attack. The available cavalry, infantry and armed citizens of Parma poured out of the city and covered the short distance to Vittoria. The remaining imperial troops attempted to organize a defence, but the settlement was insufficiently manned to withstand an attack on this scale. Once the Parmesans penetrated the outer defences, the engagement degenerated into violent close fighting among the tents, houses and streets of Vittoria.

According to Rolandino of Padua, Cremonese and other Lombard troops in imperial service were often permitted to surrender, while Germans, Apulians and especially Saracens were killed on the spot. Taddeo da Sessa, Frederick's important jurist, judge and diplomatic adviser, was gravely wounded during the fighting, reportedly losing both hands, and died soon afterwards. Manfredi Lancia returned to Vittoria and attempted to participate in the defence but was captured. The sources disagree over the human losses. The Ghibelline Piacentine annalist reported the capture of 100 cavalry and 1,500 infantry, including around 600 Cremonese. Parmese accounts claimed more than 3,000 prisoners. More than 2,000 imperial soldiers were probably captured. Several hundred more were killed, although Parmese estimates placed the dead at at least 1,500.

The material booty was enormous. Vittoria was the principal centre of Frederick's Lombard operations and contained the imperial war chest, gold and silver, jewels, precious vessels and purple textiles, weapons, administrative documents, seals, livestock and the transport animals required by the army. Nearly 15,000 quadrupeds, including horses, mules, cattle and other animals, were reportedly taken. The Parmesans also captured the carroccio of Cremona and Frederick's crown. The treasure seized in his quarters was valued by contemporary accounts at approximately 40,000 marks. Among the manuscripts carried away was a lavishly illustrated work on hunting associated with Frederick's own studies of falconry. A manuscript apparently deriving from the imperial collection was later offered to Charles of Anjou by a Milanese owner. The Parmesans set fire to Vittoria. Because much of the settlement was constructed from timber, the conflagration spread rapidly and destroyed it almost completely. Frederick and imperial detachments hurried back after seeing the smoke and flames, but by the time they arrived the battle had been lost. The emperor withdrew towards Cremona while the victorious Parmesans returned to their city with the prisoners and booty.

== Aftermath ==
The fall of Vittoria constituted a significant tactical, financial and political setback for Holy Roman Emperor Frederick II. Because Frederick himself made Vittoria a public expression of imperial authority, majesty and anticipated victory. Its destruction diminished Frederick's prestige, undermined the confidence of his allies and provided to his opponents a notable propaganda advantage.The Parmesans integrated the event into a local civic celebration. Frederick's captured crown and relics were offered to the Virgin and kept in the cathedral, while the Cremonese carroccio was displayed publicly in the baptistery as a monument to the victory. The defeat entered Parmese civic memory as an almost providential deliverance. The town's traditional motto became Hostis turbetur quia Parmam Virgo tuetur ("May the enemy be scattered, because the Holy Virgin protects Parma").

The immediate military consequences were less sweeping than the spectacle of Vittoria suggested. The force overwhelmed in the settlement constituted only the relatively small winter contingent stationed directly around Frederick; much of the imperial army had been deployed elsewhere and remained intact. Enzo continued to hold the important bridgehead positions around the Po. Frederick himself returned to offensive operations within days and by the end of February was again operating near the river. The emperor soon reopened the routes towards the Cisa Pass and renewed military pressure upon Parma. During the spring and early summer his forces repeatedly devastated the commune's vineyards and agricultural territory. Bernardo di Rolando Rossi, one of the principal architects of Parma's rebellion and a particularly bitter enemy of Frederick, was killed in fighting during these operations.

The defeat nevertheless coincided with reverses elsewhere. Ravenna and several other communes of the Romagna passed to the papal camp, while Cardinal Ranieri Capocci made gains in the March of Ancona and the Duchy of Spoleto. Frederick's finances were also placed under severe pressure by the loss of his war treasury. Innocent IV sought to exploit the setback and continued preparations for a crusade against Sicily. However, it proved a temporary success for the anti-imperial forces. Frederick soon recovered, rebuilt and reorganized his army and contained the immediate fallout from his defeat. In June 1248, when Milanese and Piacentine troops attempted to relieve the pressure on Parma from the west, Frederick still possessed sufficient forces to compel them to withdraw as soon as he moved against them. Rather than pursue them, he entrusted continued operations around Parma to Enzo and shifted his own attention towards Piedmont.

Frederick subsequently recovered Vercelli, where the imperial faction had regained control, and in the autumn established his court there. Boniface of Montferrat, who had previously joined the papal side, returned to Frederick's allegiance and received imperial forgiveness. Frederick simultaneously strengthened his relationship with the house of Savoy and appointed Thomas of Savoy as general vicar west of Pavia, granting him extensive rights and responsibilities for the defence of imperial interests in the region. Basing himself in Piedmont, Frederick continued to host leading nobles of northern Italy and ambassadors and representatives of foreign kings. Neither his deposition by Innocent IV nor his defeat at Parma removed him from his preeminent position in Europe. His vigorous diplomatic and military activity during the remainder of 1248 demonstrated the continuing breadth of his authority and resources.

By early 1249 the situation around Parma itself had again shifted. Enzo operated successfully in the area of Parma and Reggio, while renewed pressure upon the city's food supplies became sufficiently effective for Frederick once more to anticipate its possible submission. Enzo appeared broadly to command the situation in Lombardy at this point. Frederick's relatively rapid recovery demonstrated that Parma was far from a decisive destruction of his power. The war in Lombardy remained fundamentally spasmodic and localized. Frederick nevertheless had to make strenuous efforts to stabilize his finances and military system after the losses at Vittoria, raising approximately 130,000 gold ounces by the end of 1248.

According to the anti-imperial Franciscan chronicler Salimbene di Adam, "Parma fuit causa totius ruine" ("Parma was the cause of the whole ruin").

Salimbene's partisan comment contrasted with the reality of the aftermath. Frederick II had by no means been "ruined" and the imperial position remained strong. The battle had less effect than reported by Frederick's enemies. Frederick's relatively rapid recovery showed that the defeat at Parma was far from a decisive disaster, and the war in Lombardy remained fundamentally spasmodic and localized. Contemporary claims that Frederick never recovered from Vittoria went too far, even though there was still genuine political and financial damage caused by the defeat. The subsequent course of the war further demonstrated the continuing fluidity of the struggle. In May 1248 Frederick's illegitimate son Richard of Chieti defeated a papal army led by Hugo Novellus near Civitanova Marche and recovered positions in the Marches and the Duchy of Spoleto. In the following years imperial forces continued to contest northern and central Italy vigorously. In 1250 the papal forces in the Marches suffered particularly heavy defeats, while Oberto Pallavicino inflicted a severe defeat upon a Parmese field army outside Parma on 18 August. Pallavicino's forces captured the Parmese carroccio and approximately 2,000 prisoners, although the city itself remained in anti-imperial hands.

At the time of Frederick's death in December 1250, his preeminent position in Europe was challenged but certainly not lost, and his power remained very strong throughout most of Italy and Germany. The political and military situation therefore remained unresolved. Parma constituted a costly and spectacular reverse, but it neither destroyed Frederick's military power nor ended his predominance, and by 1250 the imperial side had again achieved significant victories in both northern and central Italy.

== Sources ==
- Abulafia, David (1988). Frederick II: A Medieval Emperor. London: Allen Lane. ISBN 978-0-7139-9004-1.
- Grillo, Paolo (2023). Federico II: La guerra, le città e l'Impero. Milan: Mondadori. ISBN 978-88-04-76912-5.
- Stürner, Wolfgang (2000). Friedrich II. Teil 2: Der Kaiser 1220–1250. Darmstadt: Primus Verlag. ISBN 3-89678-025-5.
- Kantorowicz, Ernst (1931). Frederick the Second, 1194–1250. London: Constable.
- Abulafia, David (1999). "The kingdom of Sicily under the Hohenstaufen and Angevins". In Abulafia, David; McKitterick, Rosamond (eds.). The New Cambridge Medieval History. Vol. 5. Cambridge: Cambridge University Press. pp. 497–521. ISBN 978-0-521-36289-4.
- Roversi Monaco, Francesca (2005). "Parma". Federiciana. Rome: Istituto dell'Enciclopedia Italiana.
- "L'assedio di Parma". Medioevo. November 2003.
- Fornari, Carlo. "La battaglia di Parma". Stupor Mundi. Archived from the original on 27 May 2011.
