= Ottaviano degli Ubaldini =

Italian cardinal

Ottaviano or Attaviano degli Ubaldini (1214 – 1273) was an Italian cardinal, often known in his own time as simply Il Cardinale (The Cardinal).

== Life ==
Born at Florence into a noble local Ghibelline family, he was appointed Archbishop of Bologna in 1240, but the appointment was not confirmed since he was considered too young. On 28 May 1244, he was made a cardinal by Pope Innocent IV, with the titulus of Santa Maria in Via Lata.

He exerted a major role within the Roman Curia, as it was important in his action against Frederick II, Holy Roman Emperor, in favour of the Guelph cause. As bishop of Bologna, he commanded the Guelph army of the Bolognese and their allies against the Ghibelline cities of lower Lombardy, roughly corresponding to present day Emilia-Romagna.

After Frederick's defeat at Parma on 18 February 1248, Ottaviano was ordered by Pope Innocent IV to recapture the papal possessions in the Po valley. This mission proved difficult, however, as Ottaviano did not have enough money to pay an army - he thus sought help from local forces, but Guelphism in the Romagna was not yet sufficiently organised. The cardinal thus turned to Bologna, a city with a solid Guelph tradition. The army led by Ubaldini succeeded in recapturing all the cities in Romagna from Imola to Rimini for the Papal States between May and June 1248, forcing even Ghibelline Forlì to recognise the papal legate.

At the battle of Fossalta (26 May 1249) the cardinal captured Frederick's son Enzo of Sardinia, whom he imprisoned in the Palazzo Re Enzo in Bologna. In 1251, following a seriously-damaging Florentine attack on the family castle at Montaccianico near Sant'Agata Mugello, Ottaviano decided to rebuild it bigger and stronger, with two curtain walls more than 3 meters (9.8 ft) thick in places, as shown by recent archaeological digs in the "Montaccianico Vive" project.

In July 1258, Manfredi supported Ottaviano's attempted Ghibelline coup in Florence. Between 1268 and 1271 he took part in the famously long Viterbo conclave, which finally led to the election of pope Gregory X. His nephew was archbishop Ruggieri degli Ubaldini.

Contemporary writers indicate Ottaviano was a strong supporter of the Ghibelline cause. He said of himself "I can say, if I had a soul, I lost it for the Ghibellines". For this Dante Alighieri places Ottaviano in the Epicurean (i.e. atheist) circle of hell, alongside Farinata degli Uberti and Frederick II.

== Sources ==
- Vittorio Sermonti, Inferno, Rizzoli 2001.
- Umberto Bosco and Giovanni Reggio, La Divina Commedia - Inferno, Le Monnier 1988.
- Bellandi Riccardo, "I Signori dell'Appennino. Amori e battaglie nella Toscana del Duegento". Polistampa, Firenze 2010
