= Oberto Pallavicino =

Italian field captain under Frederick II, Holy Roman Emperor

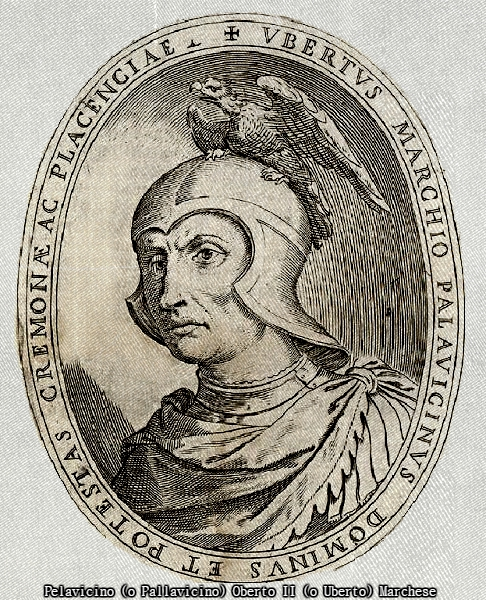

Oberto (or Uberto) Pallavicino (or Pelavicino; 1197–1269) was an Italian field captain under Frederick II, Holy Roman Emperor. He was a member of the noble Pallavicini family.

Pelavicino supported Frederick II against pope Gregory IX since 1234. Starting in 1250, he subdued the cities of Parma, Cremona, Piacenza, Pavia, and Brescia. Due to jealousness at Ezzelino III da Romano, Pelavicino joined the party of the Guelphs and took a great part in the victory of the Lombardic-Guelphish League of towns over Ezzelino at the Battle of Cassano. For this, he was awarded with the cities of Milan, Como, Lodi, Novara, Tortona, and Alessandria.

When Charles I of Sicily invaded Lombardy, Pelavicino fought again for the Ghibellines, but was beaten several times.
