= Guelphs and Ghibellines =

Rival political factions in medieval Italy

Wars of the Guelphs and Ghibellines
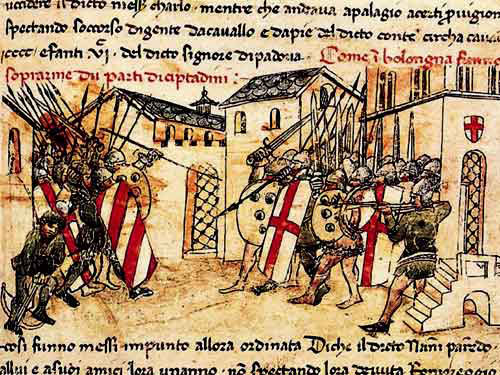
- A 14th-century conflict between the militias of the Guelph and Ghibelline factions in the comune of Bologna, from the Croniche of Giovanni Sercambi of Lucca
Date	1125–1186 (first phase); 1216–1392 (second phase)
Location	Northern-Central Italy
Result	1st phase: Peace of Constance (1186); 2nd phase: Stalemate (1392); Socio-political outcome: Decline of free communes; rise of signorie; Diffusion of Black Death; Extinction of Hohenstaufen dynasty; Conquest of the Kingdom of Sicily by Charles of Anjou; Great Interregnum after Frederick II's death; Weakening of Imperial authority over Italy
Territorial changes	Italian city-states and communes

Belligerents
Guelphs: Holy See (Papacy); 1st phase: Lombard League; 2nd phase: Welfen (Empire); Pro-Angevin Sicily; Papal States; Pro-Guelph Florence; Pro-Guelph Milan led by Della Torre; House of Della Torre; Commune of Bologna; Republic of Siena; Republic of Lucca; Republic of Genoa; March of Ferrara; Republic of Massa; Pro-Guelph Montferrat; County of Savoy; Republic of Ancona; Patriarchate of Aquileia; Lodi; Perugia; Mantua; Orvieto; Variable Italian city-states	Ghibellines: Holy Roman Empire; 1st phase: Holy Roman Empire; 2nd phase: Staufen (Empire); Pro-Staufen Sicily; March of Treviso; County of Urbino; Pro-Ghibelline Florence; Pro-Ghibelline Milan led by Visconti; Republic of Siena; Republic of Lucca; Republic of Pisa; Duchy of Modena; Republic of Massa; Pro-Ghibelline Montferrat; Pavia; Commune of Terni; Asti; Todi; Santa Fiora; Variable Italian city-states; Empire of Nicaea; Crown of Aragon

Commanders and leaders
1st phase: Guido da Landriano; 2nd phase: Emperor Otto IV; Pope Gregory IX; Pope Celestine IV; Pope John XXII; Ottaviano degli Ubaldini; Charles of Anjou; John III of Armagnac; Azzo VII, Marquis of Ferrara	1st phase: Emperor Frederick I; 2nd phase: Emperor Frederick II; Emperor Henry VII; Emperor Louis IV; Ezzelino III da Romano; Enzo of Sardinia; Manfred of Sicily; Guido I, Count of Urbino

The Guelphs and Ghibellines (/ˈɡwɛlfs ... ˈɡɪbɪlaɪnz/ GWELFS ... GHIB-il-ynze, US also /-liːnz, -lɪnz/ -eenz, -inz; Italian: guelfi e ghibellini [ˈɡwɛlfi e ɡibelˈliːni]) were factions supporting the Pope (Guelphs) and the Holy Roman Emperor (Ghibellines) in the Italian city-states of Central and Northern Italy during the Middle Ages. During the 12th and 13th centuries, rivalry between these two parties dominated political life across Italy. The struggle for power between the Papacy and the Holy Roman Empire arose with the Investiture Controversy, which began in 1075 and ended with the Concordat of Worms in 1122.

== History ==
=== Origins ===
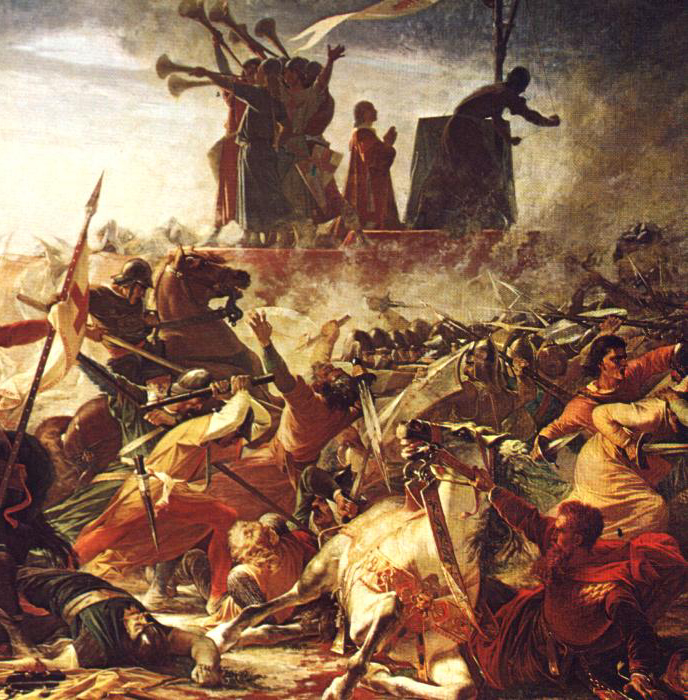
Artist's conception of the defence of the Carroccio during the Battle of Legnano (1176), painted by Amos Cassioli (1832–1891)

The conflict between Guelphs and Ghibellines arose from the political divisions caused by the Investiture Controversy, about whether secular rulers or the pope had the authority to appoint bishops and abbots. Upon the death of Emperor Henry V, of the Salian dynasty, the dukes elected an opponent of his dynasty, Lothair III, as the new emperor. This displeased the house of Hohenstaufen, who were allied with and related to the old dynasty. Out of fear of the Hohenstaufen, Lothair III placed himself under the pope's protection. To this end, he ceded all Imperial rights to the pope under Henry V's Concordat of Worms. War then broke out in Germany between those who supported the Hohenstaufen and those who were aligned with Lothair and the pope. Upon Lothair's death, the Hohenstaufen Conrad III was elected, while Lothair's heir, Henry the Proud, of the House of Welf, continued fighting.

Guelph (often spelled Guelf; in Italian Guelfo, plural Guelfi) is an Italian form of the name of the House of Welf, the family of the dukes of Bavaria (including the namesake Duke Welf II of Bavaria, as well as Henry the Lion). The Welfs were said to have used the name as a rallying cry during the Siege of Weinsberg in 1140, in which the rival Hohenstaufens (led by Conrad III) used "Wibellingen" (the name of a town today known as Waiblingen, as their cry; "Wibellingen" subsequently became Ghibellino in Italian). Thus, the Hohenstaufen faction became known as the Ghibellines and the Welfs eventually became known as the Guelphs. The Ghibellines were the imperial party, while the Guelphs supported the pope. Cities more directly threatened by the enlargement of the Papal States tended to align with the Ghibelline faction, while the cities that wanted more autonomy from the Empire tended to belong to the Guelph faction. The clash between the municipalities of Northern Italy and imperial power originated in the struggle for investitures. The Guelph Lombard League defeated Emperor Frederick Barbarossa at the Battle of Legnano in 1176. Frederick recognized the full autonomy of the cities of the Lombard league under his suzerainty.

The conflict between the two factions dominated the politics and everyday life of medieval Italy, and persisted long after the confrontation between emperor and pope had ceased. Smaller cities tended to be Ghibelline if the larger city nearby was Guelph. For example, Guelph Republic of Florence and Ghibelline Republic of Siena faced off at the Battle of Montaperti, 1260. Pisa maintained a staunch Ghibelline stance against her fiercest rivals, the Guelph Republic of Genoa and Florence. Local or regional political reasons motivated political alignments. Within cities, party allegiances differed from guild to guild, rione to rione, and a city could easily change party after internal upheavals. The conflicts between Guelphs and Ghibellines ended in the late 14th century with the creation of a new situation, where the State and the laity began to withdraw from any ecclesiastical interference.

=== 13th–14th centuries ===
At the beginning of the 13th century, Philip of Swabia, a Hohenstaufen, and Otto of Brunswick, a Welf, were rivals for the imperial throne. Philip was supported by the Ghibellines as a son of Frederick I, while Otto was supported by the Guelphs. Although the Guelphs initially succeeded in getting Otto crowned as Emperor, Otto turned against the Papacy, was excommunicated, and was replaced by Philip's heir Emperor Frederick II. Frederick II was an enemy of both Otto and the papacy, and during Frederick's reign, the Guelphs became more strictly associated with the papacy while the Ghibellines became supporters of the Empire and Frederick in particular. Pope Gregory IX excommunicated Frederick II in 1227 for failing to go on Crusade, then again for going on the Sixth Crusade (1228–1229) while excommunicated. While Frederick was in the Crusader states, this division developed there, and his regent in Italy fought a war with the Pope. That war was ended, and the excommunication was lifted in 1230, but the hostility continued.

In 1237, Frederick entered Italy with a large army, intending to subdue the defiant cities of the Lombard League. Pope Gregory tried to broker a peace, but failed. Frederick defeated the League at Cortenuova and refused all peace offers from them. He besieged Brescia but was repulsed. In 1239, Frederick was again excommunicated by Pope Gregory. In response, he expelled Franciscan and the Dominican friars from Lombardy and made his son Enzo Imperial vicar in Italy. He also annexed Romagna, Marche, the Duchy of Spoleto, and part of the Papal States, and marched through Tuscany hoping to capture Rome. He was forced to retreat, sacking the city of Benevento. Soon, the Ghibelline city of Ferrara fell and Frederick once more advanced, capturing Ravenna and Faenza. The Pope convened a council, but an Imperial-Pisan fleet defeated a Papal fleet carrying cardinals and prelates from Genoa in the Battle of Giglio. Frederick approached Rome. Meanwhile, Pope Gregory died. Frederick withdrew his forces and freed two cardinals he had jailed in Capua. However, Frederick marched again against Rome throughout 1242 and 1243.

Map of Central Europe during the time of the Hohenstaufen Emperors, primarily showing the territories of the Holy Roman Empire and the Kingdom of Sicily.

A new pope – Innocent IV – was elected. At first, Frederick was pleased with the election since Innocent had relatives in the Imperial camp. However, the new Pope immediately turned against Frederick. When the City of Viterbo rebelled, the Pope backed the Guelphs. and Frederick immediately marched to Italy and besieged Viterbo. The pope signed a peace treaty with the emperor, relieving the city. After the Emperor left, Cardinal Raniero Capocci, leader of Viterbo, had the garrison massacred. The Pope made another treaty, but he immediately broke it and continued to back the Guelphs. The Pope supported Henry Raspe, Landgrave of Thuringia as King of the Romans and soon plotted to have Frederick killed. After an attempted assassination failed, the pope fled to Liguria. Soon, the tide turned against the imperial party. The Lombard city of Parma rebelled. Enzo – who had not been present – asked his father for help. Frederick and Ezzelino III da Romano, the Tyrant of Verona, laid siege to the city. The imperial camp was ambushed by the Guelphs, and in the Battle of Parma the imperial party was routed, losing much of their treasury.

Frederick lost his momentum against the rebellious communes in the immediate future. Sensing this, Innocent began plans for a crusade against Sicily. Frederick soon recovered and rebuilt an army, but this defeat encouraged resistance in many cities that could no longer bear the fiscal burden of his regime: parts of the Romagna, Marche and Spoleto were lost. In May 1248, Frederick's illegitimate son Richard of Chieti defeated a papal army led by Hugo Novellus near Civitanova Marche and recaptured some areas of the Marche and Spoleto. Basing himself in Piedmont in June, Frederick hosted many nobles of northern Italy and ambassadors from foreign kings in his court, and his deposition, it seems, had not diminished his fame or preeminence. Nevertheless, it was only by strenuous, even unrelenting effort that Frederick was able to stabilize the situation by the close of 1248 and replenish his coffers, raising some 130,000 gold ounces. Frederick remained confident but after several years of war and conspiracy, he was increasingly suspicious and wearied.

The Ghibellines were eventually defeated in the Battle of Fossalta against the army of Bologna. Enzo was captured. Enzo was held in a palace in Bologna, where he remained captive until his death in 1272. Richard of Chieti was also killed in 1249, possibly in the same battle. Frederick named Manfred as Legate General of Italy to replace the now captive Enzo.

The struggle continued: the Empire lost Como and Modena, but regained Ravenna. From early 1250, the situation progressively favoured Frederick II. In the first month of the year, the indomitable Ranieri of Viterbo died, depriving pro-papal leadership in Italy of an implacable foe of Frederick. An army sent to invade the Kingdom of Sicily under the command of Cardinal Pietro Capocci was crushed in the Marche at the Battle of Cingoli and Imperial condottieri again reconquered the Romagna, the Marche and Spoleto. Conrad, King of the Romans scored several victories in Germany against William of Holland and forced the pro-papal Rhenish archbishops to sign a truce. Innocent IV was increasingly isolated as support for the papal cause dwindled rapidly in Germany, Italy, and across Europe generally. Frederick of Antioch had relatively stabilized Tuscany as imperial vicar and podestà of Florence. Piacenza changed allegiances to Frederick and Oberto Pallavicino, Imperial vicar of Lombardy, recaptured Parma and a swathe of central Lombardy. Ezzelino da Romano held Verona, Vicenza, Padua and the Trevisan March along with most of eastern Lombardy. Only Milan, Brescia, Modena, Mantua, Ferrara, and Bologna held out. Genoa was threatened by Frederick's allies, and Venice's support for Innocent and the League waned. Even with imperial prospects brightening, however, areas of Italy had been ravaged by years of war and even the resources of the wealthy and prosperous Kingdom of Sicily were strained. Frederick's unified regime in Italy and Sicily was despotic and brutal, imposing harsh taxes and ruthlessly suppressing dissent. Nevertheless, that his administrative system consistently recovered in the face of reversals remains an impressive feat.

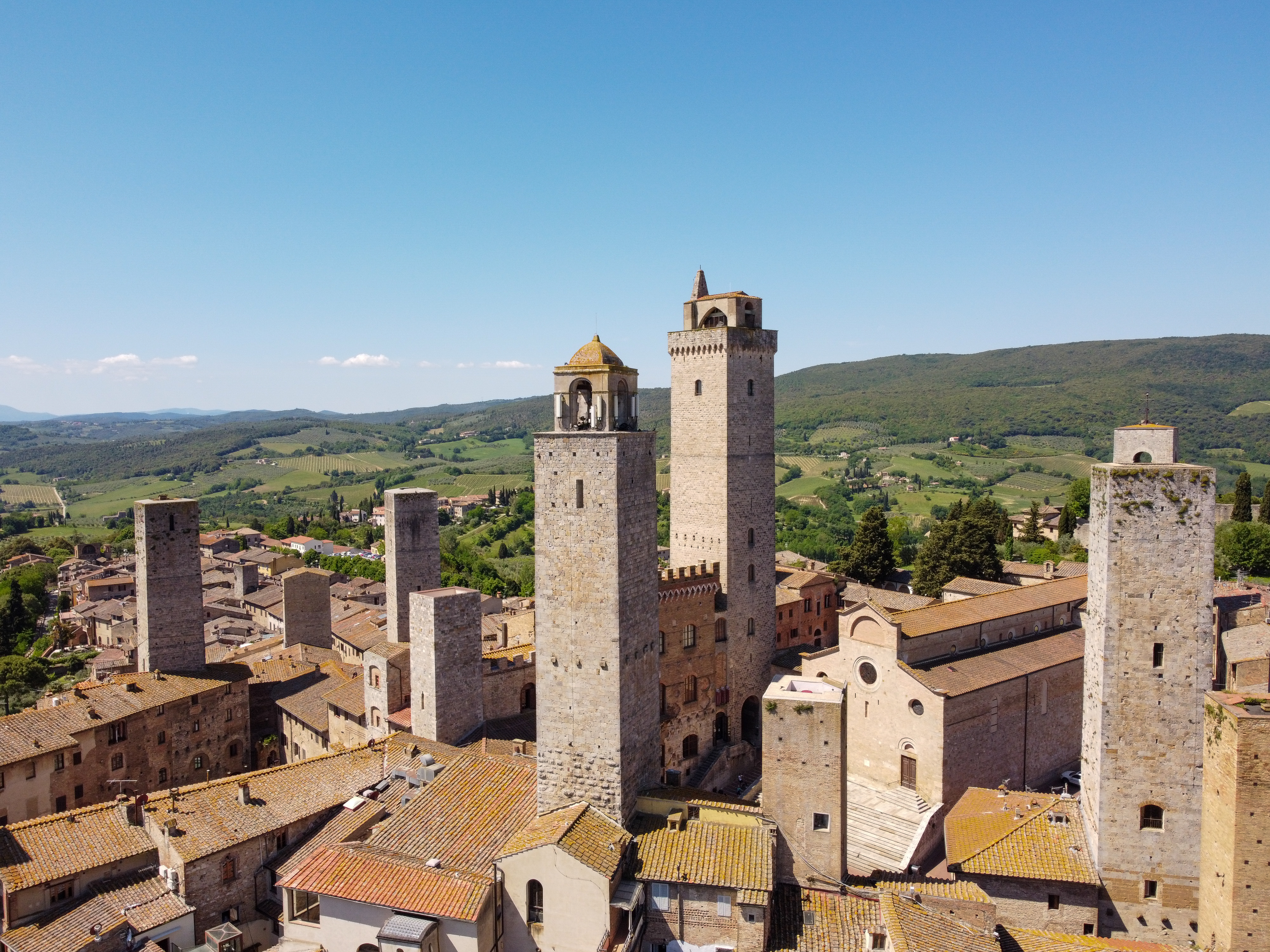
The medieval towers of San Gimignano, built by rival aristocratic families as fortified residences

Frederick, however, did not take part in any of the campaigns of 1250. He had been ill and likely felt tired, withdrawing to the Kingdom of Sicily, where he remained for much of the year. Suddenly, on 13 December 1250, however, after a persistent attack of dysentery, Frederick died in Castel Fiorentino (territory of Torremaggiore), in Apulia. Despite the betrayals, setbacks, and flux of fortune he had faced in his last years, Frederick died peacefully, reportedly wearing the habit of a Cistercian monk. Of his father's death, Manfred wrote to Conrad in Germany, "The sun of justice has set, the maker of peace has passed away."

At the time of Frederick's death, his preeminent position in Europe was challenged but certainly not lost. The political situation remained fluid and the victories of 1250 had put Frederick seemingly in the ascendant once again. Everywhere Innocent IV's fortunes seemed dire: the papal treasury was depleted, his anti-king William of Holland had been defeated by Conrad in Germany and forced to submit, while no other European monarch proved willing to offer much support for fear of Frederick's ire. In Italy, Frederick's lieutenants and partisans had recaptured much of the territories lost in the last two years; he was in a strong position, and he prepared to march on Lyon in the new year. Despite the economic strains placed on the Regno, support from the Emperor of Nicaea, John III Doukas Vatatzes, enabled Frederick to relatively refill his coffers and resupply his forces. After the failure of Louis IX's crusade in Egypt, Frederick had skillfully imagined himself as the aggrieved party against the papacy, hindered by Innocent's machinations from supporting the campaign. Frederick won growing support on the wider diplomatic stage. Only his death halted this momentum. His testament left Conrad the Imperial and Sicilian crowns. Manfred received the principality of Taranto, 100,000 gold ounces, and regency over Sicily and Italy while his half-brother remained in Germany. Henry Charles Otto, Frederick's son by Isabella of England, received 100,000 gold ounces and the Kingdom of Arles or that of Jerusalem, while the son of Henry VII was entrusted with the Duchy of Austria and the March of Styria. Perhaps aiming to lay stones for a potential peace settlement between Conrad and Innocent—or a final crafty scheme to further demonstrate papal prejudice against him, Frederick's will stipulated that all the lands he had taken from the Church were to be returned to it, all the prisoners freed, and the taxes reduced, provided this did not damage the Empire's prestige. In peacefully passing on his realms to his sons, Frederick accomplished perhaps the main goal of any ruler. At his death, the Hohenstaufen empire remained the leading power in Europe and its security seemed assured in the persons of his sons.

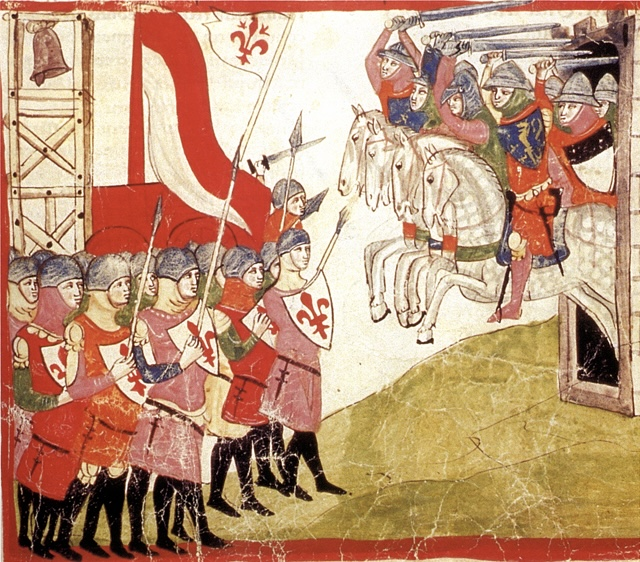
Battle of Montaperti, workshop of Pacino di Buonaguida

After the death of Frederick II in 1250, the Ghibellines were supported by Conrad IV and, later, King Manfred of Sicily. The Guelphs were supported by Charles I of Naples. The Ghibellines of Siena defeated the Florentine Guelphs at the Battle of Montaperti (1260). After the Hohenstaufen dynasty lost the Empire when Charles I executed Conradin in 1268, the terms Guelph and Ghibelline became associated with individual families and cities, rather than with the conflict between empire and papacy. The stronghold of Italian Ghibellines was the city of Forlì, in Romagna. That city remained with the Ghibelline factions, partly as a means of preserving its independence, rather than out of loyalty to the temporal power, as Forlì was nominally in the Papal States. Over the centuries, the papacy tried several times to regain control of Forlì, sometimes by violence or by allurements.

The division between Guelphs and Ghibellines was especially important in Florence. The two factions frequently fought each other over power in many other northern Italian cities. The two sides were now fighting either against German influence (in the case of the Guelphs) or against the temporal power of the Pope (in the case of the Ghibellines). In Florence and elsewhere, the Guelphs usually included merchants and burghers, while the Ghibellines tended to be noblemen. To identify themselves, people adopted distinctive customs such as wearing a feather on a particular side of their hats or cutting fruit a particular way, according to their affiliation.

The conflict between Guelphs and Ghibellines was important in the Republic of Genoa, where the former were called rampini ("grappling hooks") and the latter mascherati ("masked"), although the origin of these terms is not clear. Local families like Fieschi and Grimaldi usually sided with the Guelph party, in conflict with the Doria and some branches of the Spinola families. While Genoa was often under Guelph rule in the early years of the 13th century, in 1270, Ghibellines Oberto Spinola and Oberto Doria revolted against the Guelphs and established a separate government which lasted a couple of decades. Guelph families fled to their strongholds east (Fieschi) and west (Grimaldi). They were forced to cease their resistance after several military campaigns; they were again accepted in the city's political life after paying war expenses.

=== White and Black Guelphs ===
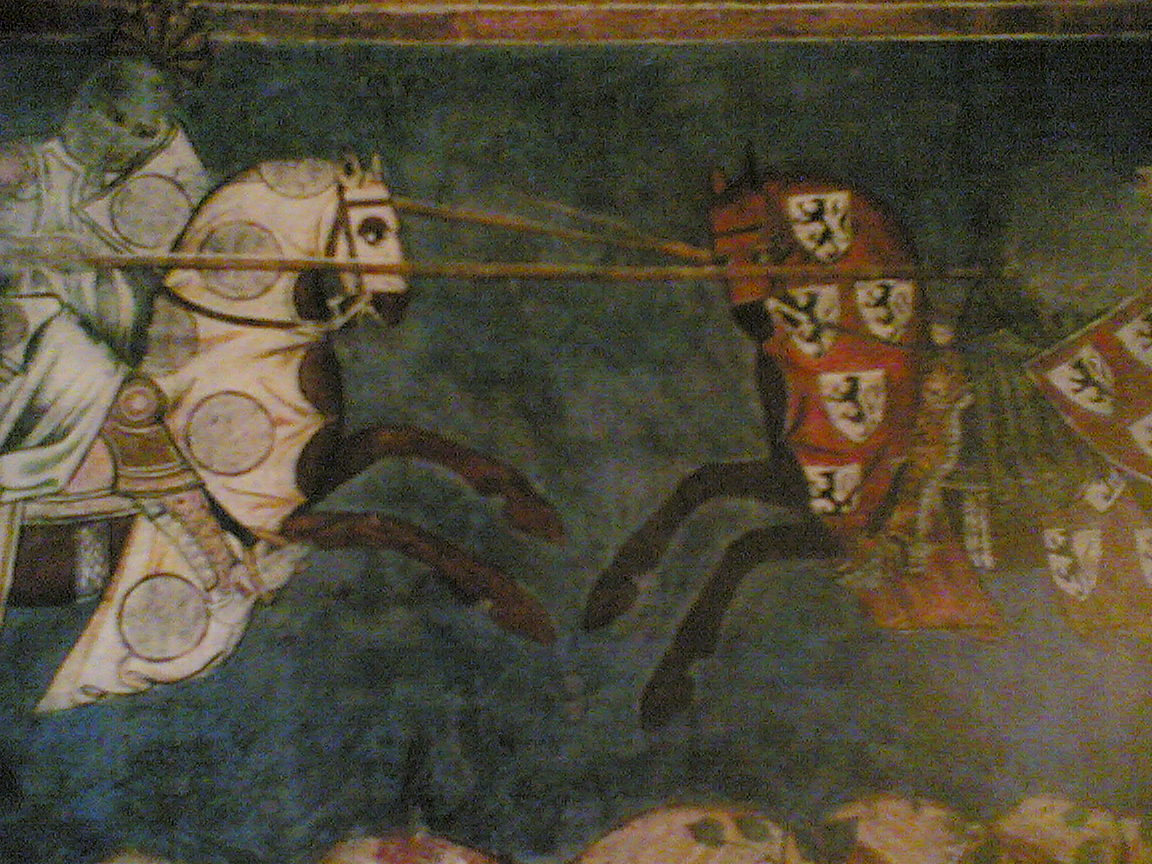
Battle of Campaldino on a fresco in San Gimignano

After the Tuscan Guelphs finally defeated the Ghibellines in 1289 at the Battle of Campaldino and at Vicopisano, the Guelphs began infighting. By 1300, the Florentine Guelphs had divided into the Black and White Guelphs. The Blacks continued to support the Papacy, while the Whites were opposed to Papal influence, specifically the influence of Pope Boniface VIII. Dante was among the supporters of the White Guelphs. In 1302, he was exiled when the Black Guelphs took control of Florence.

Those who were not connected to either side or who had no connections to either Guelphs or Ghibellines considered both factions unworthy of support but were still affected by changes of power in their respective cities. Emperor Henry VII was disgusted by supporters of both sides when he visited Italy in 1310. In 1325, the city-states of Guelph Bologna and Ghibelline Modena clashed in the War of the Bucket, resulting in Modena's victory at the Battle of Zappolino, which led to a resurgence of Ghibelline fortunes. In 1334, Pope Benedict XII threatened people who used either the Guelph or Ghibelline name with excommunication.

=== Later history ===
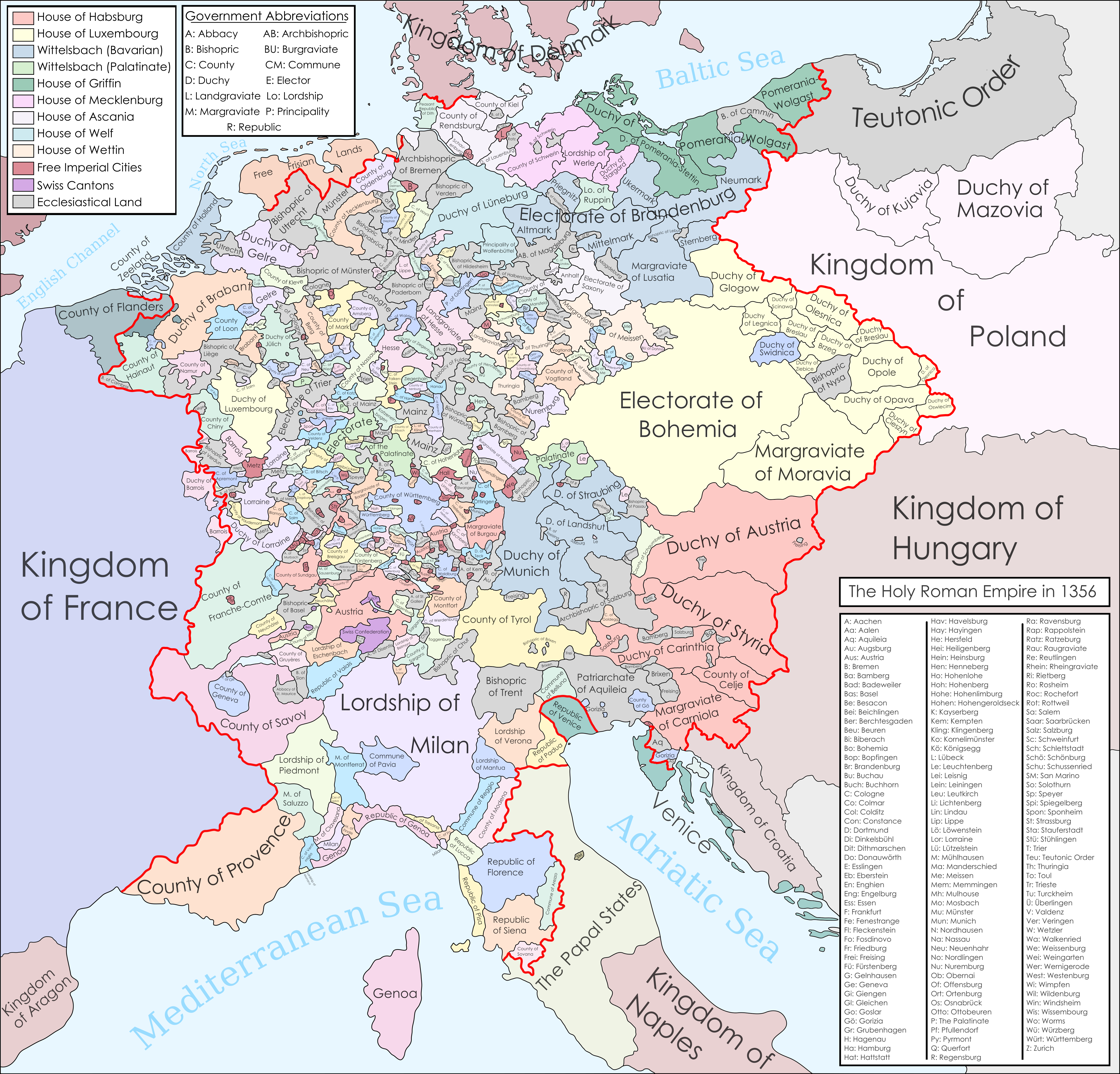
The Holy Roman Empire when the Golden Bull of 1356 was signed

The term Ghibelline continued to indicate allegiance to the declining Imperial authority in Italy, and saw a brief resurgence during the Italian campaigns of Emperors Henry VII (1310) and Louis IV (1327). Since the Pope granted Sicily (Southern Italy) to the French prince Charles I of Anjou, the Guelphs took a pro-French stance. As late as the 16th century, Ghibellines like the Colonna or Gonzaga still fought for Charles V, Holy Roman Emperor, while Guelphs like the Orsini and Este still fought for the French. During the French-dominated Avignon Papacy, Pope John XXII, who supported the French-allied King John of Bohemia, excommunicated John's rival Emperor Louis IV in 1324 and threatened heresy charges against the Ghibellines. The Ghibellines then supported Louis' invasion of Italy and coronation as King of Italy and Holy Roman Emperor. The conflict over Naples broke out again when it was conquered by Aragon in 1442 and remained fought over between the Habsburgs and Bourbons until the Bourbons gained control for good following War of the Polish Succession in 1735.

In Milan, the Guelphs and Ghibellines cooperated in the creation of the Golden Ambrosian Republic in 1447. However, over the next few years, they engaged in intense disputes. After the initial leadership of the Ghibellines, the Guelphs seized power at the election of the Captains and Defenders of the Liberty of Milan. The Guelph government became increasingly autocratic, leading to a Ghibelline conspiracy led by Giorgio Lampugnino and Teodoro Bossi. It failed, and many Ghibellines were massacred in 1449. Others fled, including the prominent Ghibelline Vitaliano I Borromeo, who was sheltered in his County of Arona. Public opinion turned against the Guelphs. In the next elections, the Ghibellines were briefly victorious, but were deposed after imprisoning Guelph leaders Giovanni Appiani and Giovanni Ossona. After Francesco I Sforza was made Duke by Milan's senate in 1450, many Ghibellines who had fled, such as Filippo Borromeo and Luisino Bossi, were restored to positions of prominence in Milan.

In the 15th century, the Guelphs supported Charles VIII of France during his invasion of Italy at the start of the Italian Wars, while the Ghibellines were supporters of the emperor Maximilian I, Holy Roman Emperor. Cities and families used the names until Charles V, Holy Roman Emperor consolidated imperial power over Italy in 1529. In the course of the Italian Wars of 1494 to 1559, the political landscape changed radically, and the division between Guelphs and Ghibellines became irrelevant. This became evident with the election of Pope Paul V (1605), the first to bear the "Ghibelline" Reichsadler in chief on his Papal coat of arms.

=== Modern aftermath ===
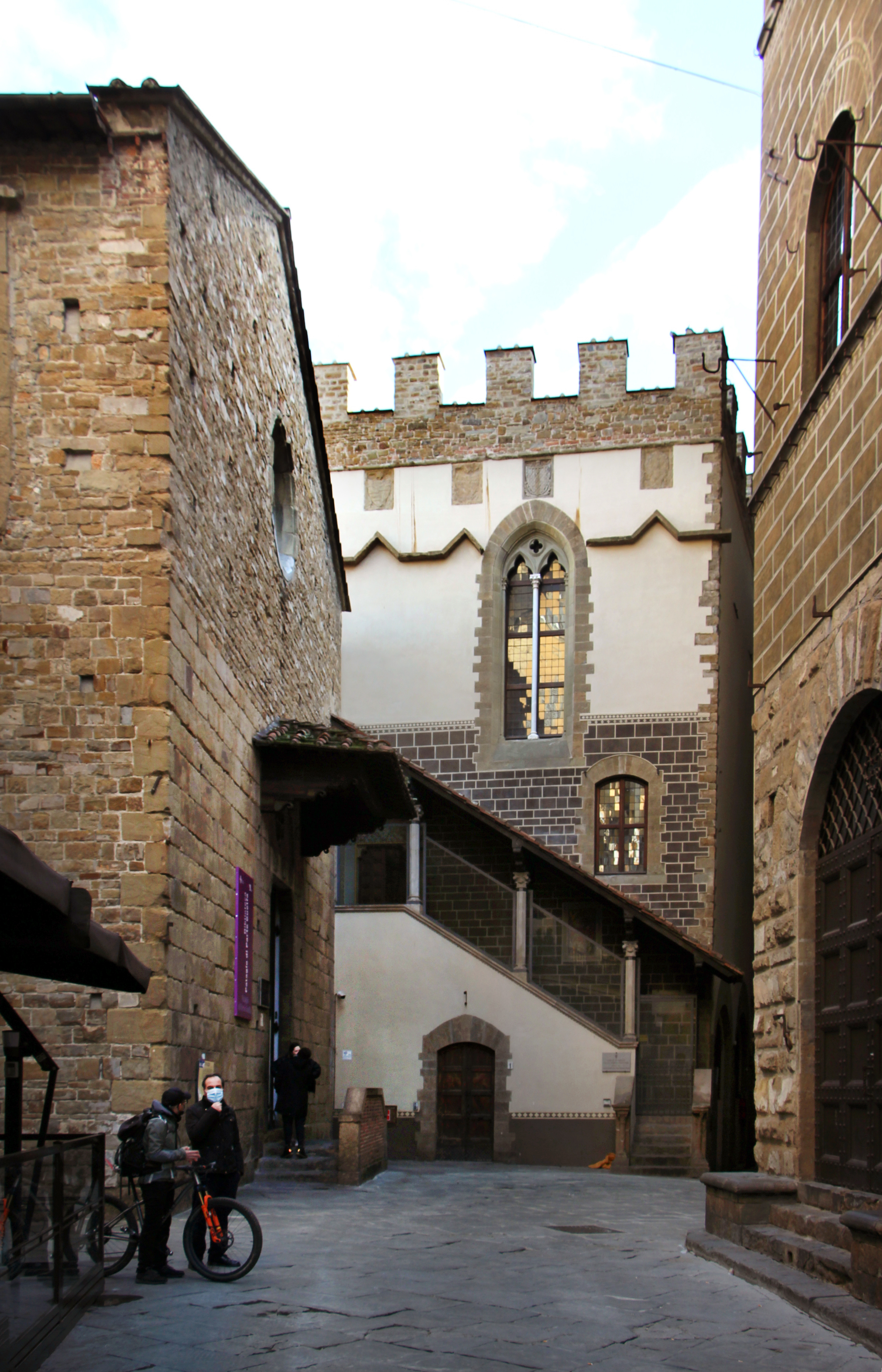
Palazzo di Parte Guelfa in Florence

On 25 March 2015, the Parte Guelfa was reconstituted as a Christian order and archconfraternity to serve the Catholic Church and the Catholic Archdiocese of Florence, guided by the Captain-General Andrea Claudio Galluzzo under the custody of Consul Luciano Artusi. The Mayor of Florence established the headquarters of the reborn Guelph Party in the historic Palazzo di Parte Guelfa in the city.

== Allegiance of the main Italian cities ==
Main Ghibelline cities	Main Guelph cities	Cities of variable allegiance
Arezzo; Assisi; Asti; Como; Fabriano; Foligno; Forlì; Grosseto; Modena; Pavia; Pisa; Pistoia; Spoleto; Terni; Treviso; Urbino	Alessandria; Ancona; Aquila; Bologna; Brescia; Camberia; Crema; Cremona; Faenza; Genoa; Lecco; Lodi; Mantua; Orvieto; Perugia; Pontevico	Bergamo; Ferrara; Fivizzano; Florence; Gubbio; Lucca; Milan; Padua; Parma; Piacenza; Prato; San Miniato; Siena; Verona; Vicenza

== Allegiance of the main Italian families ==
Main Ghibelline families	Main Guelph families	Families of variable allegiance
Della Scala: from Milan; Lambertazzi: from Bologna; Carrari: from Bologna; Parcitadi: from Rimini; Frigerio: from Como; Quadrio: from Como; Visconti: from Milan; Guttuari: from Asti; Guidi: from Casentino; Ubaldini: from Mugello; Torelli: from Ferrara; Ordelaffi: from Forlì; Uberti: from Florence; Lamberti: from Florence; Della Gherardesca: from Pisa; Salimbeni: from Siena; Buonconti: from Siena; Da Romano: from Treviso; Aleramici: from Montferrat; Pallavicino: from Po Valley; Gorini: from Pisa	Geremia: from Bologna; Fieschi: from Genoa; Della Torre: from Milan; Giocoli: from Ferrara; Este: from Ferrara; Turchi: from Ferrara; Adelardi: from Ferrara; Malatesta: from Rimini; Del Sale: from Ravenna; Cerchi: from Florence; Cavalcanti: from Florence; Frescobaldi: from Florence; Falconieri: from Florence; Gherardini: from Florence; Pazzi: from Florence; Simonetti: from Florence; Tornaquinci: from Florence; Ugoni: from Brescia; Boschetti: from Modena; Rangoni: from Modena; Della Rosa: from Modena; Guidoni: from Modena	Malaspina: from Tuscany

== In heraldry ==
Some individuals and families indicated their faction affiliation in their coats of arms by including an appropriate heraldic "chief" (a horizontal band at the top of the shield). Guelphs had a capo d'Angiò or "chief of Anjou", containing yellow fleurs-de-lys on a blue field, with a red heraldic "label", while Ghibellines had a capo dell'impero or "chief of the empire", with a form of the black German imperial eagle on a golden background. Families also distinguished their factional allegiance by the architecture of their palaces, towers, and fortresses. Ghibelline structures had "swallow-tailed" crenellations, while those of the Guelphs were square.

Coat of arms of an Italian family with Ghibelline (Imperial) style heraldic chief at top

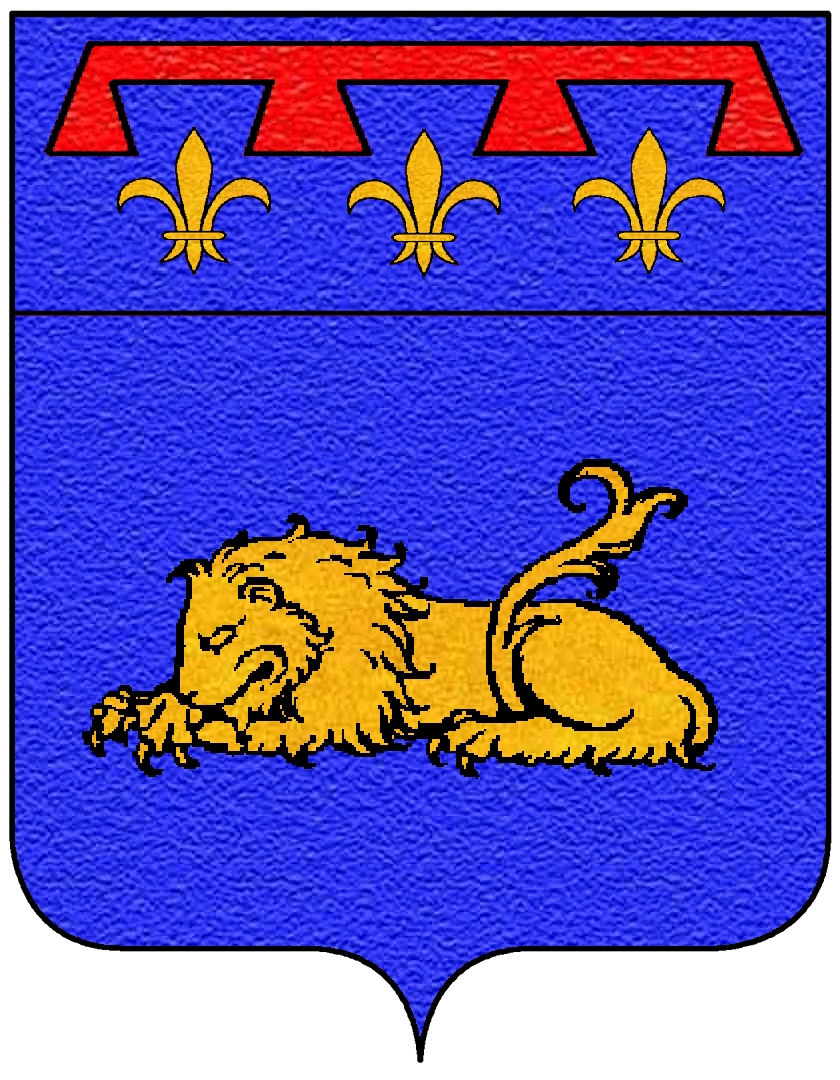
Coat of arms of the Roberti family of Reggio, with Guelph (Anjou) style heraldic chief at top

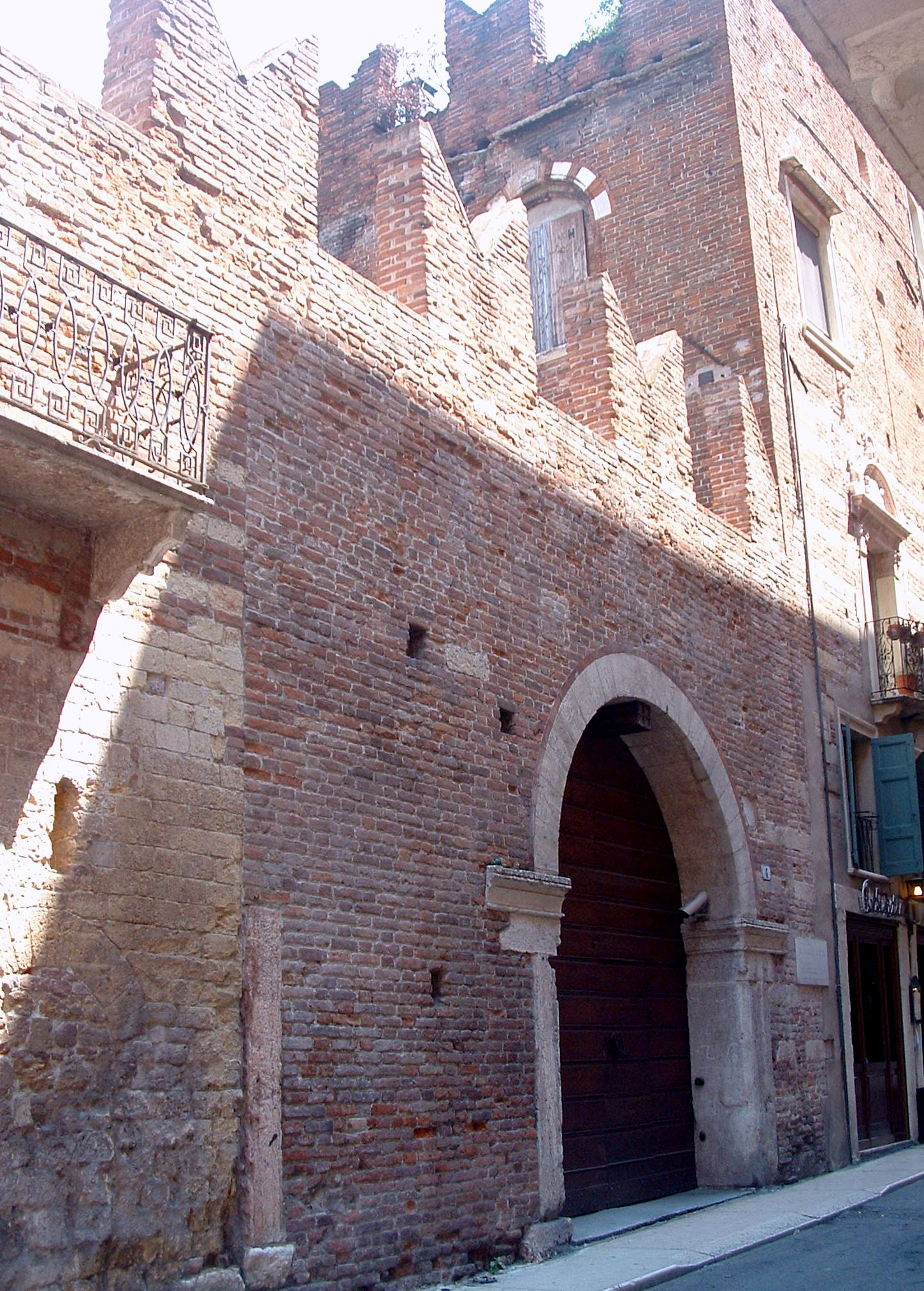
Ghibelline swallow-tailed merlons of the "Casa di Romeo", of the Montecchi family of Verona.

Annotated diagram with both types of merlons

== In vexillology ==
During the 12th and 13th centuries, armies of the Ghibelline communes usually adopted the war banner of the Holy Roman Empire – white cross on a red field – as their own. Guelph armies usually reversed the colors – red cross on white. These two schemes are prevalent in the civic heraldry of northern Italian towns and remain a revealing indicator of their past factional leanings.

Guelph Flag

Ghibelline Flag

== In art and popular culture ==
=== In literature ===
- In Dante Alighieri's Inferno (1300s), participants in the conflict are featured prominently. For example, Mosca dei Lamberti is the character suffering in hell for the schism for which he was held responsible.
- In The Decameron (1350s) by Giovanni Boccaccio, one of the ladies is a firm adherent of the Ghibellines.
- The Life of Castruccio Castracani (1520) by Niccolò Machiavelli tells the struggle between the Guelphs and Ghibellines in the city of Lucca during the reign of Tuscan condottiere Castruccio Castracani.
- In the notes to the poem The Shepheardes Calender (1579), English poet Edmund Spenser's annotator E. K. claimed (incorrectly) that the words "Elfs" and "Goblins" derive etymologically from Guelphs and Ghibellines.
- The Shakespeare play Romeo and Juliet is believed to have been based on the conflict, as the city of Verona had switched hands often between the two groups. Shakespeare may have also based the Capulet and Montague families on the two groups.
- Valperga (1823) is a historical novel by Mary Shelley influenced heavily by both Dante and Boccaccio, that deals directly with the Guelph and Ghibelline conflict. Its central figure, Castruccio Castracani, is a Ghibelline, while his love, the Duchess of Valperga, is a Guelph.
- In Schopenhauer's essay "On Women", he claimed that women are usually unfriendly toward each other. The reason is that "with women only one thing is decisive, namely, which man they please." Schopenhauer asserted that "Even when they meet in the street, women look at one another like Guelphs and Ghibellines." ("Schon beim Begegnen auf der Straße sehn sie einander an wie Guelfen und Ghibellinen.")
- In The Cantos (1915–1962), Ezra Pound makes repeated mention of both Guelfs and Ghibellines. The pro-Papal Guelfs are associated with usury and corruption, while the pro-Imperial Ghibellines are associated with law and order. The famous "fascist" canto, LXXII, makes mention of Ezalino (who would appear to be the sometime-Ghibelline leader Ezzelino III da Romano), "who didn't believe the world was made by a Jew" (i.e., he rejected papal and Christian claims and embraced the antisemitism of World War II in the fascist milieu in which the Canto was written).
- In Christ Stopped at Eboli (1945), Carlo Levi compares the peasants and gentry of Aliano to the Guelphs and Ghibellines, respectively, with the Fascist regime as the Holy Roman Empire and the desire to be left alone for local rule as the Papacy.
- In The Lost Steps (1953), by Alejo Carpentier, the narrator refers to the Guelphs and Ghibellines to describe the nature of the sudden guerrilla fighting that breaks out in the streets of a Latin American city.
- In The Quentaris Chronicles fantasy book series (2003–2009), the Duelphs and Nibhellines are feuding families based on the Guelphs and Ghibellines.
- In A Room with a View, book written by E. M. Forster in 1908, there is a reference to the Guelph and Ghibelline conflict in the first chapter after Miss Bartlett and Mr Beeb's conflict, when one of the little old ladies comes to chatter.
- In Rumpole and the Tap End published in the Third Rumpole Omnibus (1997), written by John Mortimer, the rival crime families, the Timsons and the Molloys, are likened to the Guelphs and Ghibellines.

=== In film ===
- The Flame and the Arrow (1950) starring Burt Lancaster, Virginia Mayo and Nick Cravat is set in the Guelph and Ghibelline era of 12th century Lombardy.
- Barbarossa (2009) starring Rutger Hauer, Raz Degan and F. Murray Abraham is set during the struggles between Guelphs and Ghibellines and in particular during the battle of Legnano.
- In Jeff Baena's The Little Hours (2017), based on The Decameron, Nick Offerman plays a minor Lord given to long, rambling conspiracy theories about how the Guelphs are coming for him.

=== In music ===
- Riccardo Zandonai's early 20th-century opera Francesca da Rimini follows a plot of the character from Dante's Inferno, part of which includes a battle between the Guelphs and Ghibellines.

=== In video games ===
- In Europa Universalis V, the player can steer the conflict towards either side if they are present in Italy. If the Guelphs win the conflict, the current Italian states leave the Holy Roman Empire; if the Ghibellines win the conflict, the rest of Italy joins the Holy Roman Empire.

== See also ==
- Cæsaropapism
- Guelph, Ontario
- Hierocracy (medieval)
- Royal Guelphic Order
- Clash between the Church and the Empire

== Bibliography ==
- Abulafia, David (1988). Frederick II: A Medieval Emperor. Penguin Press. ISBN 88-06-13197-4.
- Faini, Enric (2006). Il convito del 1216. La vendetta all'origine del fazionalismo fiorentino (PDF) (in Italian). University of Florence.
- Kantorowicz, Ernst (1937). Frederick the Second, 1194–1250. New York: Frederick Ungar.
- Machiavelli, Niccolò (1532). History of Florence and of the Affairs of Italy from the Earliest Times to the Death of Lorenzo the Magnificent. Archived from the original on 13 October 2016.
