= Uc de Saint Circ =

Quercy troubadour

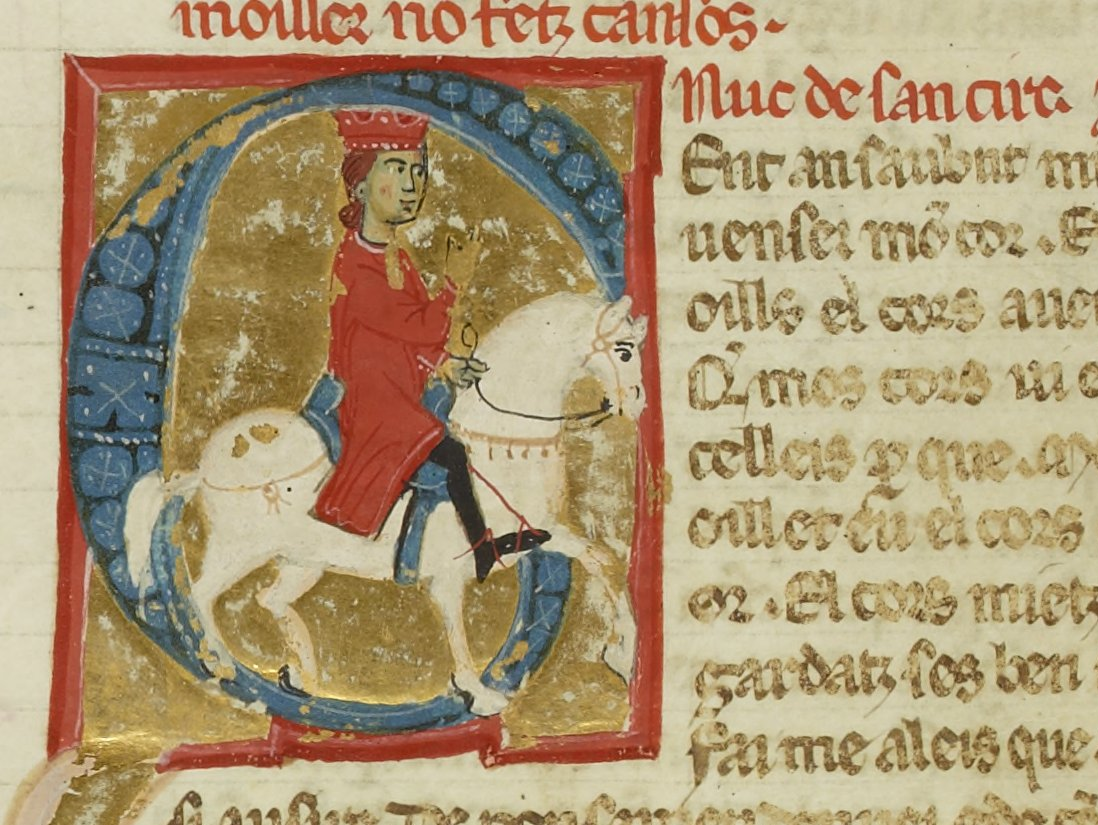
Uc's portrait in a manuscript of vidas, some of which he wrote

Uc de Saint Circ (San Sir) or Hugues (Hugh) de Saint Circq (fl. 1217–1253) was a troubadour from Quercy. Uc is perhaps most significant to modern historians as the probable author of several vidas and razos of other troubadours, though only one of Bernart de Ventadorn exists under his name. Forty-four of his songs, including fifteen cansos and only three canso melodies, have survived, along with a didactic manual entitled Ensenhamen d'onor. According to William E. Burgwinkle, as "poet, biographer, literary historian, and mythographer, Uc must be accorded his rightful place as the 'inventor' (trobador) of 'troubadour poetry' and the ideological trappings with which it came to be associated."

Uc is probably to be identified with the Uc Faidit (meaning "exiled" or "dispossessed") who authored the Donatz proensals, one of the earliest Occitan grammars. This identity fits with Uc's status as the "inventor" of troubadour poetry as a distinct type and his life in Italy (possibly due to exile during the Albigensian Crusade).

== Biography ==
Uc was born in the town of Thégra to a minor nobleman, Arman, lord of Saint-Circ-d'Alzon, a village which no longer exists but was in the vicinity of Rocamadour. According to Uc's vida, the castle of Saint-Circ lay "at the foot of" (al pe de) the church of Sainta-Maria de Rocamadour, which is atop a cliff overlooking the Alzon river valley and was destroyed by war in Uc's time. Furthermore, according to his vida, Uc's many older brothers sent him off to receive a clerical education in Montpellier. At Montpellier he learned to read and write and discovered "songs and poems and sirventes and tensos and couplets and the deeds and the sayings of the worthy men and the worthy women who were living or had lived in the world." It was through this education that he became a minstrel (jongleur).

Uc's gained fame through the coblas and partimens he exchanged with the Count of Rodez, under whom he probably served in the Albigensian Crusade, and through the two tensos he exchanged with Raymond III of Turenne, brother of Maria de Ventadorn. He also had contact with Dalfi d'Alvernha, to whom he addressed one poem. According to his vida, he went into Gascony, where he wandered around on foot—occasionally on horse—penniless. Eventually he gained settled down with Guillerma de Benauges, a countess and viscountess, who introduced him to Savaric de Mauleon, who in turn clothed and outfitted him.

According to his vida, he spent a considerable amount of time with Savaric in Poitou and the surrounding regions before heading into Catalonia and Aragon, where he was at the court of Peter II; Castile, where he attended that of Alfonso VIII; and finally León, where he was at that of Alfonso IX. Around 1220 he moved east into Provence, where his vida says he was "with all the barons", and into Lombardy and the March of Treviso (marca Trevisana). During his travels in Languedoc, Spain, Provence, and Italy he probably met many other troubadours. Eventually Uc is said to have settled down with a wife and children, after which he never composed songs. Uc's association, in Italy, with the da Romano and Malaspina families is evident in his surviving poetry. It lasted forty years while he was in Italy, where he was probably a Guelph.

== Poetry ==
According to one version of his vida, Uc non fez gaires de las cansos ("never accomplished much with his songs"), apparently because he was "never really in love with a lady". While the biographer commended his lyrical and melodic compositions, he probably regarded his fifteen cansos out of a total forty-four poems as unusually low. He was reputed to be able to feign love and to praise and belittle women with ease, but after his marriage his poetic output ceased.

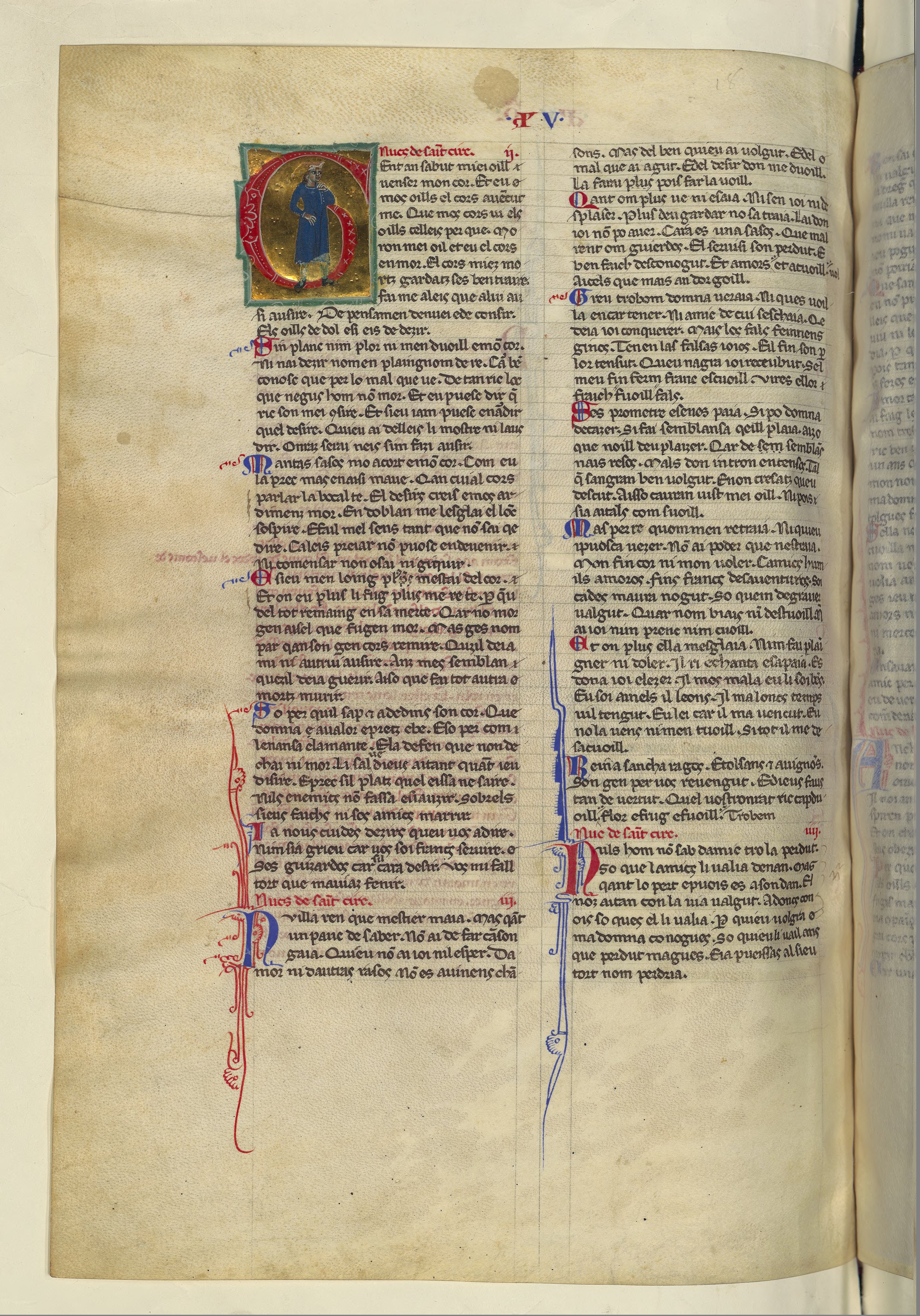
The page with Uc's vida and some examples of his poetry

Uc's poetry was influenced by his ecclesiastical education. As mentioned above, he wrote cansos and tensos, but also some sirventes. His work is in general pedantic and truculent. One of Uc's sirventes, which begins Messonget, un sirventes, acknowledges that it is el son d'en Arnaut Plagues ("the song of lord Arnaut Plagues"), an imitation of Be volgra midons saubres by Arnaut. Another of his sirventes, which begins as a "light" work with many textual affinities to at least four other troubadour works, but it ends as a political assault on Ezzelino III da Romano, the viceroy of the Emperor Frederick II in Italy: Chanzos q'es leu per entendre.

In Un sirventes voill far, Uc demonstrates a hatred of the emperor, accusing him, a "monster of heresy", of believing in neither immortality nor paradise. Furthermore, he intends to humiliate France and the Church and so the Crusade against him in Apulia is justified because selh qu'en Dieu non cre non deu terra tener: "he who does not believe in God should not reign".

Uc also composed a danseta in which the refrain was apparently repeated between the four stanzas.

== Prose ==
Late in his life, at the da Romano court, Uc became a representative of the academic prose style then coming into fashion. In this vein he composed a collection of vidas and razos. Most of these were written in Italy and the numerous historical errors they contain have been attribute to the time and distance between the lives and events they describe, for, judging by the Italianisms which had crept into Uc's vocabulary by the time they were written, he must have been in Italy a while before he began their composition. The razos have been dated to 1227–1230 and no post-1219 events are recorded in them. Uc's earliest attempt at biography, however, is the collection of razos of Bertran de Born, which were possibly penned in Languedoc or shortly after his arrival in northern Italy; in his later works he refers to the razos of Bertran as l'autr'escrit: "the other writings". The sole vida to contain a direct claim of authorship is that of Bernart de Ventadorn, which says: Et ieu, N'Ucs de Saint Circ, de lui so qu'ieu ai escrit si me contet lo vescoms N'Ebles de Ventadorn ("And I, Lord Uc of Saint Circ, have written about him [Bernart] what the viscount Lord Ebles of Ventadorn told me").

Among the vidas he is supposed to have written is one of Sordello, a troubadour at the court of Ezzelino III and Alberico da Romano. In it he presents what is probably the "official" court version of the kidnapping of Cunizza: that Ezzelino ordered him, who lived at the court of Cunizza's erstwhile husband, Rizzardo di San Bonifacio, to take her back to him. Uc wrote an exchange with Peire Guilhem de Luserna, an Italian troubadour, concerning Cunizza, in which Uc attacked her and Peire defended her.

== Sources ==
- Aubrey, Elizabeth. "References to Music in Old Occitan Literature." Acta Musicologica, 61:2 (May–Aug., 1989), pp. 110–149.
- Aubrey, Elizabeth. The Music of the Troubadours. Indiana University Press, 1996. ISBN 0-253-21389-4.
- Bond, Gerald A. "The Last Unpublished Troubadour Songs." Speculum, 60:4 (Oct., 1985), pp. 827–849.
- Burgwinkle, William E. "For Love or Money: Uc de Saint-Circ and the Rhetoric of Exchange." Romanic Review, 84:4 (1993:Nov.) pp. 347–377.
- Burgwinkle, William E. "The chansonniers as books" (pp. 246–262). The Troubadours: An Introduction. Simon Gaunt and Sarah Kay, edd. Cambridge: Cambridge University Press, 1999. ISBN 0-521-57473-0.
- Cabré, Miriam. "Italian and Catalan troubadours" (pp. 127–140). The Troubadours: An Introduction. Simon Gaunt and Sarah Kay, edd. Cambridge: Cambridge University Press, 1999. ISBN 0-521-57473-0.
- Chambers, Frank M. "Imitation of Form in the Old Provençal Lyric." Romance Philology, 6 (1952/1953) pp. 104–121.
- Egan, Margarita (ed. and trans.) The Vidas of the Troubadours. New York: Garland, 1984. ISBN 0-8240-9437-9.
- Gaunt, Simon, and Kay, Sarah. "Appendix I: Major Troubadours" (pp. 279–291). The Troubadours: An Introduction. Simon Gaunt and Sarah Kay, edd. Cambridge: Cambridge University Press, 1999. ISBN 0-521-57473-0.
- Guida, Saverio. "Uc de Saint Circ e Clara d'Anduza". Messana: Rassegna di studi filologici, linguistici e storici, 4 (1990), pp. 169–94.
- Guida, Saverio. "L'attività biografica di Uc de Saint Circ a Treviso". Il Medioevo nella Marca: trovatori, giullari, letterati a Treviso nei secoli XIII e XIV. Treviso: 1991, pp. 91–114.
- Guida, Saverio. "Uc de Saint Circ usuraio ed eretico?" Cultura Neolatina, 54 (1994), pp. 169–98.
- Guida, Saverio. Primi approcci a Uc de Saint Circ. Soveria Mannelli, 1996. ISBN 88-7284-440-1.
- Guida, Saverio. "Lo (pseudo)pseudonimo della danseta di Uc de Saint Circ (Bdt 457, 41:3)". Tenso: Bulletin de la Société Guillem IX, 21 (2006), pp. 7–22.
- Jeanroy, Alfred, and Salverda de Grave, J. J. Poésies de Uc de Saint-Circ. Toulouse: 1913.
- Meneghetti, Maria Luisa. "Intertextuality and dialogism in the troubadours" (pp. 181–196). The Troubadours: An Introduction. Simon Gaunt and Sarah Kay, edd. Cambridge: Cambridge University Press, 1999. ISBN 0-521-57473-0.
- Poe, Elizabeth Wilson. "L'Autr'escrit of Uc de Saint Circ: The Razos for Bertran de Born." Romance Philology, 44:2 (1990:Nov.) pp. 123–136.
- Sansone, E. Giuseppe. La poesia dell'antica Provenza: testi e storia dei trovatori. Ugo Guanda, ed. 1993.
- Throop, Palmer A. "Criticism of Papal Crusade Policy in Old French and Provençal." Speculum, 13:4 (Oct., 1938), pp. 379–412.
- Uc de Saint Circ, Complete works.
- Zinelli, Fabio. "Uc de Saint-Circ imitatateur de Hugues de Berzé? Les chansons BdT 457,26 et RS 1821". Medioevo Romanzo, 28 (2004), pp. 39–62.
- Zinelli, Fabio. "La chanson Be fai granada follor (BdT 457,7): Un cas d'attribution controversée et la tradition manuscrite de Saint-Circ (avec une note sur l'iconographie de C)". Studi medievali, 47:2 (2006), pp. 589–651.
