= Filippo da Pistoia =

Italian prelate, military leader and diplomat

Filippo da Pistoia, also called Filippo Fontana or anglicized Philip (died 18 September 1270), was an Italian prelate, military leader and diplomat. He was the bishop-elect of Ferrara from 1239 until 1252, bishop-elect of Florence from 1250 until 1251 and archbishop of Ravenna from 1250 until his death. He was the apostolic legate in Germany between July 1246 and March 1247, in Lombardy and the Trevigiana between December 1255 and August 1258 and throughout northern Italy between 1267 and February 1270. He served as podestà (mayor) of Ravenna in 1254.

Educated in Spain and France, Filippo was a worldly prelate, a corpulent oenophile who kept a court of musicians and a constant bodyguard. He had at least three sons and a daughter, only finally receiving episcopal consecration in 1260. In spiritual matters, he showed partiality to the Franciscans. His legatine missions were devoted to fostering military alliances and prosecuting wars. He engineered the election of Henry Raspe as king of Germany in opposition to Emperor Frederick II in 1246. He frequently led troops himself in the inveterate contest between pro-papal and pro-imperial forces in Italy, always on the side of the Papacy. He considered himself papabile in the papal election of 1264–1265, but was passed over. He suffered from declining health in his last two years.

Filippo's pastoral works as bishop are poorly known. His career can be told in detail because of the numerous documents issued by him and to him by various popes, and because of his friendship with the historian Salimbene de Adam. He was overall "a man dedicated to action more than the care of souls, and more to military action than diplomacy, [with] a character totally alien to conciliation."

== Early life ==
Filippo was born in Pistoia in the 1190s and owned a house in Pistoia throughout his life. In the past he was often linked to the Fontana family of Ferrara, but this appears to be without foundation. He may have been related to the Vergiolesi of Pistoia. His friend and confidante, Salimbene de Adam, who is the main source for his youth, writes that he was related to his predecessor in the diocese of Ferrara, Garsendinus. He apprenticed as a necromancer in Toledo before studying philosophy and theology at the University of Paris. After completing his studies, he lived in Toulouse and then Ferrara until receiving a canonry in the cathedral of his native city.

In 1239, Filippo was elected bishop of Ferrara. He was present when the Guelphs swore an oath at Bologna on 20 December 1239 to oppose the forces of Emperor Frederick II. The chronicles refer to him as a bishop then, but he is not otherwise documented as bishop-elect until November 1240.

== Bishop of Ferrara ==
Since the city of Ferrara was in the hands of pro-imperial forces, Filippo organized the anti-imperial offensive in the Po Valley. In January 1240, he seized Bergantino, which belonged to the diocese of Ferrara, and then the castle of Bondeno, which belonged to the abbey of Nonantola. He was checked at Ostiglia. In February, he began the siege of Ferrara, which was held by Salinguerra Torelli. His army consisted of Venetians, Ferrarese exiles, the men of Azzo VII d'Este (who had been banned by the emperor in June 1239) and the Guelphs of Bologna, Mantua and Milan. In June, they took the city.

Now that Filippo was in command of his diocese, the diocesan properties that had belonged as fiefs to the Torelli and Ramberti families were confiscated and granted to the Este, who distributed them to their followers. On 21 May 1240, in obedience to an order of Pope Gregory IX, he ceded the revenues of San Pietro di Massa Nuova to the diocese of Cervia to compensate it for the damages it suffered during the war. On 26 November 1240, he placed the castle of Argenta in the care of Azzo VII. Sometime before 25 June 1243, he authorized the construction of a Franciscan church on land donated by the commune.

At the height of the Mongol threat to the Holy Roman Empire in 1241, Filippo circulated a letter in Italy claiming to show that Frederick II had sent envoys to the Mongols and was in league with them. The pope's agents spread similar rumours in Germany.

Throughout his time in Ferrara, he showed favour to Pistoians in the diocesan service, as he later also did at Ravenna. As bishop, he kept a court more typical of a secular lord: populated with musicians, bards and a guard of forty armed men. He also had a great fondness for wine.

== Legate in Germany ==
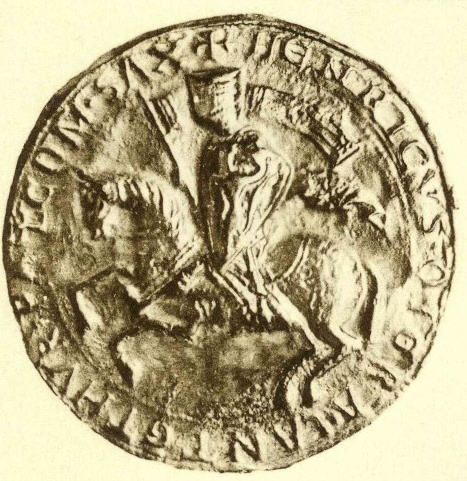
Seal of Henry Raspe before he became king

Filippo attended the Council of Lyon, whereat Frederick II was excommunicated again in June 1245. Pope Innocent IV then sent him to Germany to convince Landgrave Henry Raspe to accept election as king in opposition to Frederick. He arrived in Cologne in August and was accompanied or at least given safeconduct by the archbishop, Conrad of Hochstaden, when he traveled to meet Henry. He stayed with Henry throughout the fall and winter. The landgrave only consented to his election in March 1246. In April, he was in Würzburg to prepare for the election, but the opposition of the citizens forced its relocation to a nearby village. After Henry was elected at Veitshöchheim on 22 May, Innocent congratulated Filippo on his successful mission and appointed him apostolic legate to Germany on 5 July. As legate and on the pope's instructions, Filippo excommunicated all of Frederick's ecclesiastical supporters who refused to appear at the Hoftag (assembly) called by Henry that month. The pope also authorized him to name the new bishop of Regensburg, since the diocese had fallen vacant in March 1246. Filippo appointed Albert of Pietengau, but he proved a disappointment to the anti-imperial party.

Evidence of Filippo's success in Germany comes also from Frederick II's letters. The emperor complained the pope about Filippo and also wrote to his own supporters demanding they bar the legate's passage. Filippo did, however, exceed the wishes of the pope when he excommunicated Otto II, Duke of Bavaria, and placed his lands under interdict in October 1246. Filippo was with the new King Henry throughout the winter. He had joined the siege of Ulm by 18 January 1247. When Henry died suddenly on 17 February while the siege was ongoing, the army disintegrated and Filippo was left isolated. According to Salimbene, he went into hiding in a Franciscan convent and ordered the friars not to discuss the death of Henry except in his presence and in Latin. Disguising himself as a Franciscan, he sneaked through a ditch and had to be forcibly pushed through a hole in the town wall because he was so fat. He escaped Germany and was replaced as legate in March. He was back in Ferrara by the summer.

== Archbishop of Ravenna ==
In February 1250, Filippo was elected bishop of Florence, although he appears to have remained in Ferrara. He was soon after elected to the archdiocese of Ravenna on the initiative of the pope. He appears to have been elected by 5 April 1250, although a papal document of 20 April still refers to him only as bishop of Ferrara. The opposition of the counts of Bagnacavallo prevented his travelling to Ravenna, and so he continued managing three dioceses from Ferrara. Another Pistoian, Giovanni de' Mangiadori, was elected to Florence in his stead in 1251.

On 12 March 1251, Filippo received a delegation of Ravennate exiles encouraging him to come to Ravenna with Bolognese assistance. He renewed the emphyteusis of archdiocesan lands belonging to Azzo VII, but the latter was not forthcoming with assistance. He sent a missive to Ravenna from Ferrara on 24 September and another five days later from Argenta demanding the city's submission to him and the Holy See. Receiving no response, he excommunicated the magistrates and placed the city under interdict. On 5 December, Innocent IV charged him with re-establishing peace in the archdiocese by military means and, on 25 January 1252, confirmed the interdict.

An indication of the difficulty of managing more than one diocese as bishop-elect is found in the dispute between Filippo and his Ferrarese chapter in March 1252. The latter refused to recognized an act of Filippo's which had inadvertently been sealed with the seal of Ravenna rather than that of Ferrara. On 17 August 1252, a new bishop was elected for Ferrara and Filippo ceased to administer it.

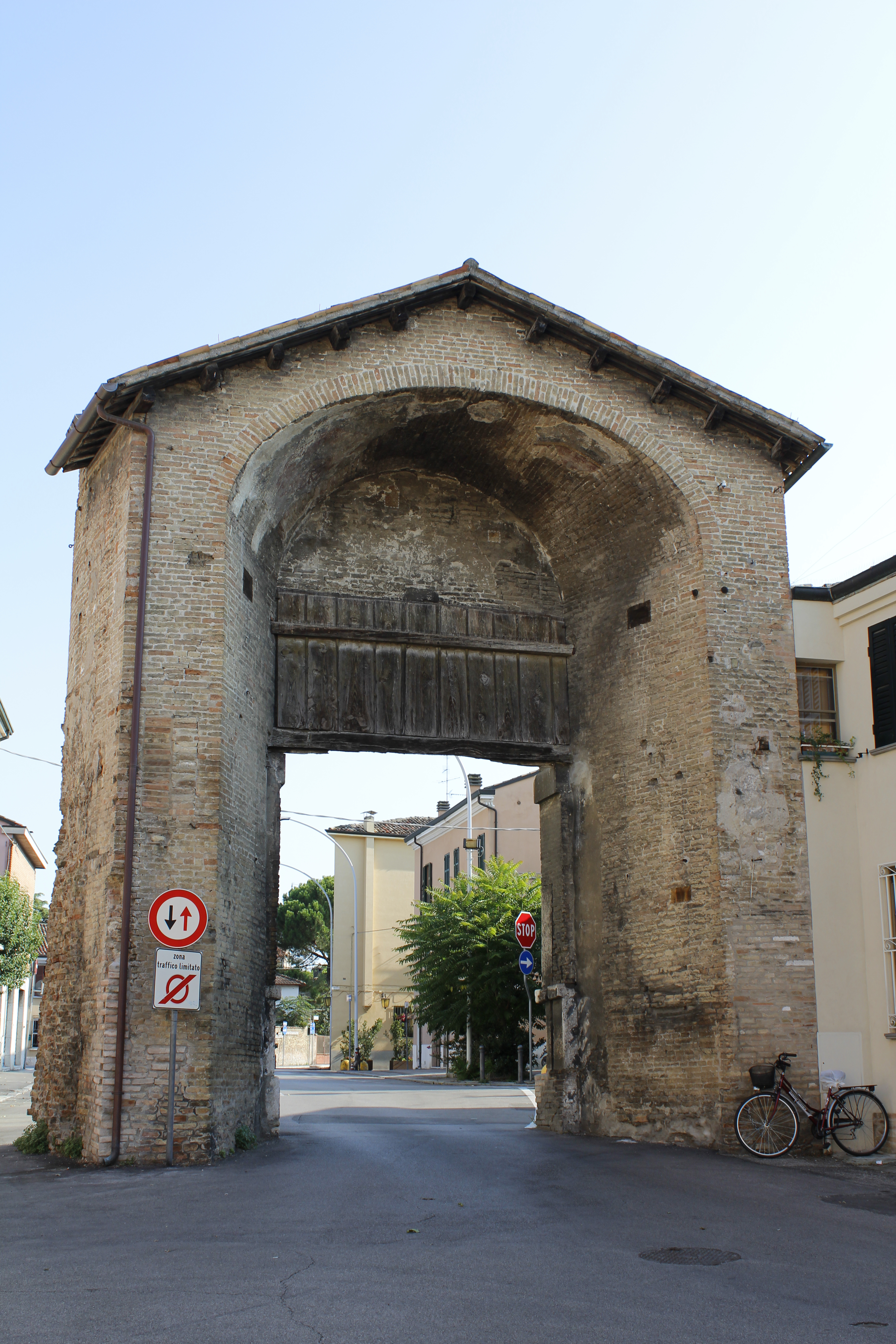
Upkeep of the Porta San Mama was the responsibility of the archbishop of Ravenna.

On 3 April 1252, Filippo's appointment as legate in Lombardy was postponed so that the legate Ottaviano degli Ubaldini could finish his work. He would not take up the office for another three years, but in the interim he entered Ravenna on 1 March 1253. He even served a term as podestà in 1254, combining secular and ecclesiastical offices. He promulgated statutes dealing with the office of podestà, fines and policing. The archbishop was also responsible for the upkeep of the Porta San Mama. On 28 April 1254, he held a provincial synod.

Innocent IV continued to trust important tasks to Filippo. By July 1254, he had appointed him mediator in the dispute between the Republic of Venice and the rector of Cervia, Tommaso da Fogliano, over the Cervia salt pans. On 4 September, Innocent named him mediator in the dispute between the diocese of Forlimpopoli and the counts of Castrocaro. Between November 1254 and December 1255, Filippo was in Apulia trying to foster an alliance against King Manfred of Sicily, whose right to the crown the pope disputed. In early December, he returned to Ravenna.

== Legate in Lombardy ==
On 20 December 1255, Filippo was finally appointed legate in Lombardy and the March of Treviso by Pope Alexander IV. He prosecuted the crusade against Ezzelino da Romano, the leading pro-imperial lords in the region, becoming a crucesignatus (crusader) himself. In March 1256, he preached the crusade in Venice and, in May, at Ferrara. He was not only involved in preaching, but also led armies from the front. According to Rolandino of Padua, Filippo incited his forces from the front lines during their final assault on Padua on 20 June 1256. He did not seek to prevent the sack of the city, but on 21 June held a public service of thanksgiving during which he released the city from excommunication. These actions made him notorious, according to Rolandino, and many cities and castles moved to surrender before being sacked. Rolandino's account includes a probably fictitious but powerful dialogue between Filippo and Ezzelino. He does not give the legate the more powerful argument.

Following the fall of Padua, the army reinforced by Venetians, Bolognese and Chioggians under the condottiero Giovanni da Schio marched against Vicenza. Filippo appointed his old ally Azzo VII as captain-general of the army, but as it approached Vicenza word of the imminent arrival of Ezzelino caused panic in the ranks. The Bolognese fled, while Filippo and Azzo retreated to Padua. The archbishop began fortifying the city against a possible siege. He refused to give Ezzlino battle, while receiving reinforcements from the patriarch of Aquileia, Venice, Ferrara and Mantua.

In January 1257, Filippo took an army to Mantua and opened negotiations with Brescia. Through the efforts of a Dominican friar, he was permitted to enter Brescia, where he convinced them to submit to the Holy See and abandon Ezzelino. After the latter made peace with his brother, Alberico da Romano, on 8 May 1257 at Castelfranco, Filippo excommunicated Alberico. Fearing the Brescia would return to the Romano camp, he and Azzo VII occupied it on 27 April 1258. In May, he visited Milan on a diplomatic mission but failed to strengthen the Guelph alliance there.

While at Milan, Filippo placed the city of Forlì under interdict on 30 May. He then returned to Brescia to forestall the takeover by the pro-imperial exiles led by Oberto Pelavicino and Buoso da Dovara. Filippo, who had led forces out to meet Oberto, was forced by the sudden arrival of Ezzelino in August to retire to Gambara and await rescue by Azzo VII. On 30 August, the crusader army was crushed and Filippo captured. Ezzelino entered Brescia on 1 September 1258.

== Return to Ravenna ==
Filippo was kept imprisoned in Brescia, although he was treated with respect. After the death of Ezzelino on 1 October 1259, he passed into the control of Oberto Pelavicino, who refused all papal entreaties for his release. Filippo eventually escaped his prison and took refuge in Mantua before returning to Ravenna later that autumn. During his four-year absence from his diocese, the bishop of Pistoia, Guidaloste Vergiolesi, operated as his vicar at least between May 1257 and July 1259.

Filippo, having only ever been an electus in any see, was finally consecrated archbishop in 1260, sometime before 19 June, when the first document describing him as such was issued. Nevertheless, some documents continued to style him electus as late as 1264.

In 1260, Filippo received the Flagellants with approval. On 28 March 1261, he held a provincial synod to coordinate his bishops' actions against usurpations of church rights and properties by the communes and the feudal lords during the wars. According to Salimbene, Filippo showed special favour the Franciscans at this synod.

In 1262, under pressure from the new papal legate, Filippo ordered the commune of Ravenna to provide assistance for the papal reconquest of the March of Ancona. He also pressured Rimini to contribute. On 17 February 1264, he took part with other regional Guelph leaders in the election of Obizzo II d'Este as lord (signore) of Ferrara. Although he approved the election, he had preferred Aldighiero Fontana for the role, according to the chronicler Riccobaldo of Ferrara.

== Legate in northern Italy ==
According to Salimbene, who brought Filippo the news of Pope Urban IV's death on 2 October 1264, Filippo hoped to be elected pope. He was not, but the next pope, Clement IV, appointed him apostolic legate with a wide remit across northern Italy in 1267: his legation covered Lombardy, Romagna, the March of Treviso, the patriarchates of Aquileia and Grado, plus the cities of Ravenna, Milan, Genoa and Dubrovnik with their dioceses and ecclesiastical provinces. His task was to organize an alliance to prevent Conradin, then in Germany, from making his way to Sicily, which he claimed by hereditary right.

On 16 August 1267, Filippo was congratulated by Clement IV on his success. When Conradin arrived at Verona on 21 October, Filippo was at Mantua. He immediately excommunicated the Sicilian claimant and his supporters, including Oberto Pelavicino and the cities of Verona and Pavia. Filippo's term as legate was guaranteed until 15 May 1268. Shortly after this date, Clement heard rumours of his death and on 30 July reserved the right to name his successor in Ravenna.

Although Filippo was not dead, his health was in decline. He was residing at Argenta on 6 December 1269, when he appointed a procurator to oversee all his diocese's temporalities. On 11 January 1270, he entrusted the bishop-elect of Imola, Sinibaldo, with naming a new prior for Cella Volana. In February, he resigned his office of legate. Argenta was his main residence during this period.

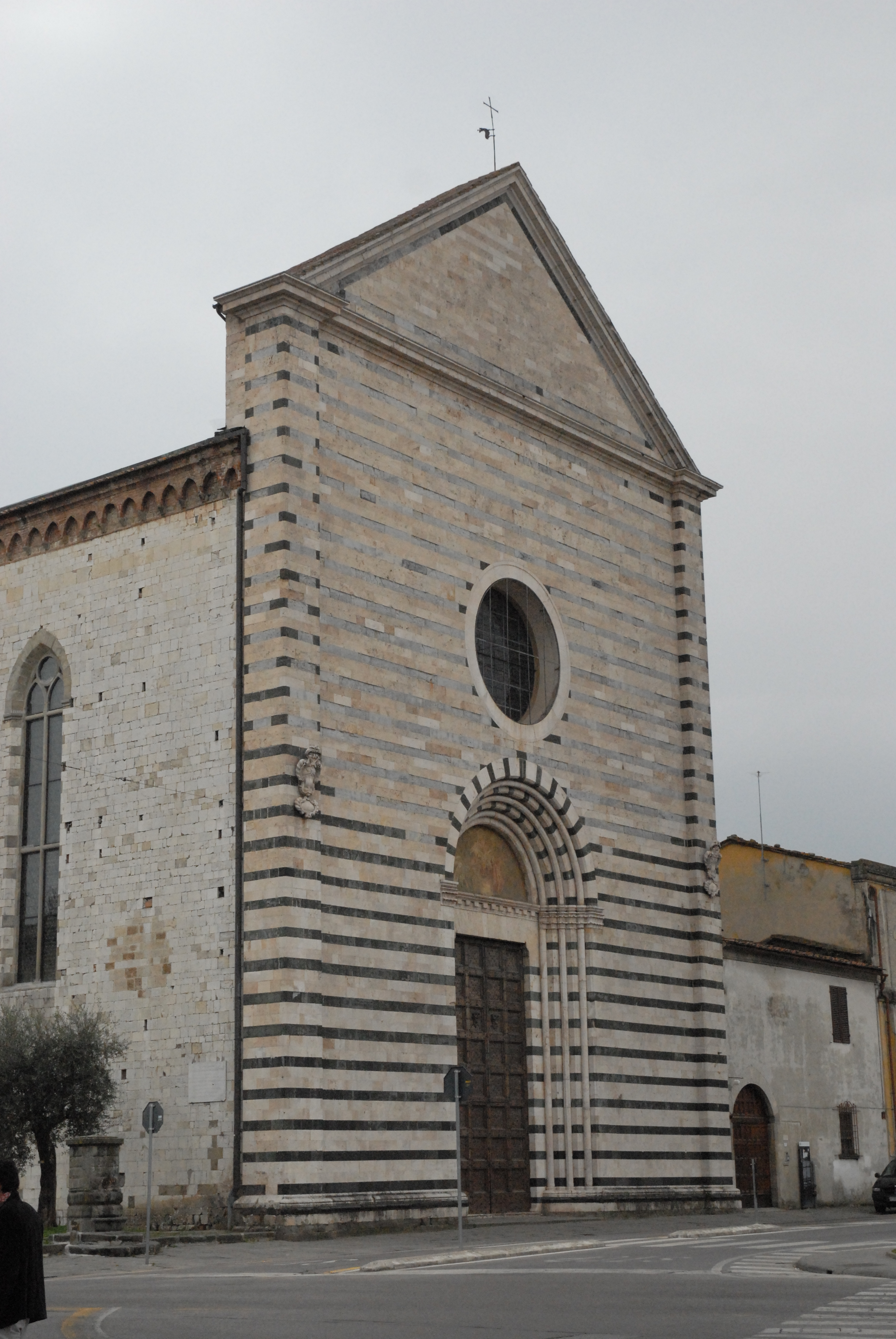
The Franciscan church in Pistoia where Filippo is buried

== Death and children ==
On 19 April 1269, Filippo convoked a provincial synod to meet in the Basilica of San Vitale in Ravenna, but he did not personally attend. The presidency fell to the bishop of Comacchio. By August 1270, he was seriously ill when he left Argenta for his hometown. On 1 September, he met Salimbene in the Franciscan convent in Imola. He continued on to Bologna in a sedan chair. There he ceded Argenta to Obizzo II, as he had ceded it thirty years earlier to Azzo VII. He finally arrived in Pistoia early in September and died there on 18 September 1270. He was buried in the Franciscan church in Pistoia.

Salimbene records that Filippo had at least four children. In exchange for Argenta, Obizzo paid a sum of money to a certain Filippo and Francesco, who are referred to as the archbishop's nephews in the charter. In reality, they were his sons. Another son, Nicola, was a judge in Bologna and was killed during the Bolognese siege of Faenza on 7 April 1275. Salimbene mentions a daughter, but does not name her.

== Bibliography ==
- Chambers, James (1979). The Devil's Horsemen: The Mongol Invasion of Europe. Book Club Associates.
- Huffman, Joseph P. (2000). The Social Politics of Medieval Diplomacy: Anglo-German Relations (1066–1307). University of Michigan Press.
- Keay, Donald L. (1987). "Research Note: Frederick II and the Bishops of Regensburg". Bridgewater Review. 5 (2): 18–21.
- Miller, M. C. (2006). "Why the Bishop of Florence Had to Get Married". Speculum. 81 (4): 1055–1091. doi:10.1017/s0038713400004280. S2CID 163412470.
- Morgante, M. (1959). Filippo da Pistoia, arcivescovo di Ravenna (1190 ... ? – 1270). Ascoli-Piceno.
- Purcell, Maureen (1975). Papal Crusading Policy: The Chief Instruments of Papal Crusading Policy and Crusade to the Holy Land from the Final Loss of Jerusalem to the Fall of Acre, 1244–1291. E. J. Brill.
- Raccagni, Gianluca (2016). "The Crusade Against Frederick II: A Neglected Piece of Evidence" (PDF). The Journal of Ecclesiastical History. 67 (4): 721–740. doi:10.1017/s002204691600066x. hdl:20.500.11820/254ed423-3dd5-4255-85ec-feaf8a2ad6e1.
- Sodders, Daniel R. (1996). Conrad the Fourth as German King, 1237–1250 (PhD dissertation). University of Kansas.
- Thompson, Augustine (2005). Cities of God: The Religion of the Italian Communes, 1125–1325. Pennsylvania State University Press.
- Torre, Augusto (1970). "La data della morte di Filippo Arcivescovo di Ravenna". Archivio Storico Italiano. 128 (2): 199–206. JSTOR 26257461.
- Van Cleve, Thomas C. (1972). The Emperor Frederick II of Hohenstaufen: Immutator Mundi. Clarendon Press.
- Whalen, Brett Edward (2019). The Two Powers: The Papacy, the Empire, and the Struggle for Sovereignty in the Thirteenth Century. University of Pennsylvania Press.
- Zanella, Gabriele (1997). "Filippo da Pistoia". Dizionario Biografico degli Italiani (in Italian). Vol. 47: Ferrero–Filonardi. Rome: Istituto dell'Enciclopedia Italiana. ISBN 978-88-12-00032-6.

Catholic Church titles
Preceded by Garsendinus	Bishop of Ferrara; 1239–1252	Succeeded by Giovanni Quarini
Preceded by Ardingo Trotti	Bishop of Florence; 1250–1251	Succeeded by Giovanni de' Mangiadori
Preceded by Teoderico	Archbishop of Ravenna; 1250–1270	Succeeded by Bonifacio Fieschi di Lavagna
