= Siege of Ferrara =

1240 Guelph-papal capture of Ferrara

- Part of the Guelph–Ghibelline conflict and the conflict between Frederick II and Pope Gregory IX
| Date | February – 2 June 1240 |
| Location | Ferrara, Kingdom of Italy |
| Result | Guelph–papal victory: Ferrara captured, Ghibelline faction exiled; Lower Po brought under papal-allied control |

Belligerents
| Holy Roman Empire; Ferrara; Ghibellines: Pro-imperial contingents | Papacy; Republic of Venice; Este; Guelph cities: Mantua; Ravenna; Bologna; Milan |

Commanders and leaders
| Salinguerra Torelli; Guido da Sesso | Azzo VII d'Este; Gregorio da Montelongo; Filippo da Pistoia; Alberico da Romano |

Strength
| 2,500–4,000: Substantial contingent of German cavalry; Reinforcements from pro-imperial communes | 6,000–9,000: 200 Milanese cavalry; Venetian naval forces with siege equipment |

Casualties and losses
| 1,000 killed, wounded or captured | Hundreds killed or wounded |

The Siege of Ferrara was fought from February to 2 June 1240 between the pro-imperial forces holding Ferrara under Salinguerra Torelli and a coalition supported by Pope Gregory IX, Azzo VII d'Este and the Republic of Venice. The operation formed part of the wider struggle between Emperor Frederick II and the papacy and its allies in northern Italy. After a four-month campaign conducted both on land and along the Po, the coalition captured Ferrara, expelled Salinguerra’s pro-imperial supporters and secured control of the lower reaches of the river.

== Background ==
Ferrara had long been contested between Salinguerra Torelli and Azzo VII d'Este, whose rivalry formed part of the unstable pattern of alliances in north-eastern Italy. Salinguerra eventually established control of the city and aligned himself closely with Frederick II and Ezzelino III da Romano, while Azzo retained supporters within Ferrara. Ferrara also possessed considerable strategic and commercial importance because of its position on the lower Po and the river routes connecting northern and central Italy. Its alignment with Frederick had brought commercial advantages, while its growing control of the river system increasingly conflicted with Venetian interests.

During the winter of 1239–1240, after Frederick had left northern Italy, his opponents moved to exploit the situation. Gregory IX appointed his supporter Filippo da Pistoia bishop of Ferrara, and a coalition formed around Filippo, Azzo, Alberico da Romano, Mantua, Ravenna and Venice. Milan and Bologna also supported the anti-imperial offensive. The imperial alignment in the region was weakened by local rivalries: Mantua, despite previously belonging to the pro-imperial camp, joined Frederick’s opponents, while even strongly imperial Cremona allowed hostile forces to pass through its territory.

== Siege ==
The offensive began in February 1240. Forces associated with the bishop of Ferrara first occupied the strategically important castles of Bergantino, Bondeno and Ficarolo, west of Ferrara along the Po, placing these positions under anti-imperial control and increasing the isolation of the city. Exiles from Ferrara and the bishop’s vassals were reinforced by troops from Mantua, Ravenna and Bologna, which advanced along the river in boats. At the same time, a Venetian naval force moved westward up the Po. Its vessels carried wooden towers and siege equipment, allowing the coalition to operate against Ferrara from the river as well as from the surrounding countryside. From the west, the papal legate Gregorio da Montelongo arrived from Milan at the head of 200 Milanese cavalry.

By March Ferrara was surrounded from both land and river. Salinguerra nevertheless commanded substantial forces within the city, including a sizeable contingent of German cavalry and reinforcements sent by pro-imperial communes. The city’s podestà, the Reggian Guido da Sesso, took part in directing the defence. Despite these resources, the defenders were unable to break the blockade or restore secure communications with the surrounding imperialist territories. The siege continued for approximately four months. The attacking coalition as composed of Venetians, Bolognese, Ravennates, Azzo d’Este and Milanese, with forces from Mantua probably also participating, under the prominent leadership of Montelongo. On 2 June 1240 Ferrara capitulated.

== Aftermath ==
Following the surrender, Azzo d’Este assumed power in Ferrara in the name of the pope, while the Venetian Stefano Badoer was installed as the city’s new podestà. Salinguerra was arrested together with his family and taken to Venice, and his adherents were expelled from Ferrara. Abulafia describes the fall of the imperialist stronghold as having involved the betrayal of Salinguerra and emphasizes the benefits obtained by Venice, whose interests in the struggle were closely connected with securing commercial predominance in the upper Adriatic and its associated waterways.

The capture of Ferrara gave the papal-allied coalition control over the lower course of the Po and represented an important strategic success in north-eastern Italy. Stürner places the loss among a series of setbacks which briefly made the imperial position in the Romagna appear severely endangered. Frederick responded by marching north through the March of Ancona and in August rapidly recovered Ravenna, before turning against Faenza. The fall of Ferrara therefore marked a significant local and strategic reverse for the imperial party, but did not end Frederick’s military offensive in northern Italy.

== Sources ==
- Abulafia, David (1988). Frederick II: A Medieval Emperor. London: Allen Lane. ISBN 978-0-7139-9004-1.
- Grillo, Paolo (2023). Federico II: La guerra, le città e l'Impero. Milan: Mondadori.
- Stürner, Wolfgang (2000). Friedrich II. Teil 2: Der Kaiser 1220–1250. Darmstadt: Primus Verlag. ISBN 978-3-89678-025-6.
