= Ezzelino I da Romano =

Italian nobleman (d. 1189)

Ezzelino I da Romano, also known as Ezzelino il Balbo (died 1189) was an Italian nobleman of the Ezzelini family, who was lord of Onara, Romano, Bassano and Godego.

== Biography ==
The son of Alberico and the grandson of the family's founder, Ecelo, in 1148 he took part in the Second Crusade along with Louis VIII of France and Conrad III of Germany, fighting in Damascus and Ashkelon. Upon his return to Italy, he received the fiefs of Oderzo and Mussolente.

In 1173, he was appointed as podestà of Treviso and, in the same period, he was also podestà of Vicenza. In 1175, together with Anselmo of Dovara, he commanded the Lombard League army, which halted Frederick Barbarossa's march near Alessandria. In 1176, he led the Treviso troops in the battle of Legnano.

After the peace of Constance, he switched his allegiance from the Guelph to the Ghibelline party, and reconciled with the emperor. Ezzelino died in 1189 and was succeeded by his son Ezzelino II.

== Sources ==
- Rapisarda, Mario (1965). La signoria di Ezzelino da Romano. Udine.
