= Paolino Veneto =

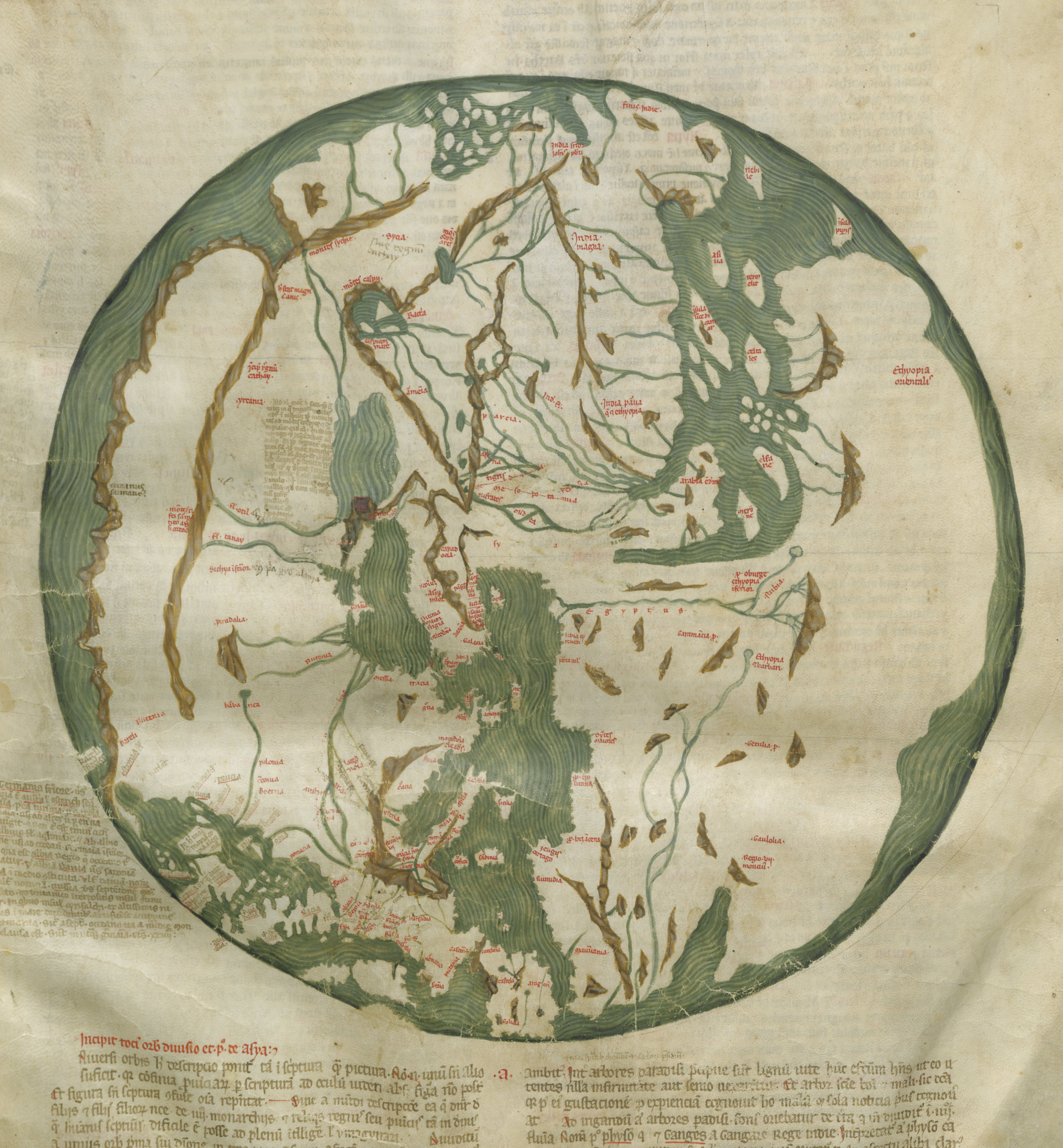
Map of the world from a copy of Paolino's Compendium (BNF lat. 4939)

Paolino Veneto (c. 1272 – 22 June 1344) was an Italian Franciscan inquisitor, diplomat and historian. He served as an ambassador for the Republic of Venice and the Papacy. From 1324 until his death, he was the bishop of Pozzuoli. He simultaneously served as a member of the royal council of King Robert of Naples. He wrote three universal chronicles in Latin–the Epithoma, Compendium and Satirica–and a mirror for princes in Venetian.

== Life ==
Paolino was born between 1270 and 1274. Nothing is known of his family background. He may have been born in Venice, as his surname implies, but it is possible that he acquired the name by joining the Franciscan convent of Santa Maria Gloriosa dei Frari in Venice. He is first recorded in the Liber contractuum of the Franciscans of Padua as a student in their studium on 12 December 1293.

=== Lecturer and inquisitor ===
In 1301, Paolino was a lecturer in theology at Venice. He was present on 30 November when the inquisitor Antonio da Padova confronted Doge Pietro Gradenigo over the introduction of the inquisition into Venice. On 12 August 1302, in his capacity as guardian of Santa Maria Gloriosa dei Frari, he was ordered by the papal legate Guy de Neuville to hand over the money which the inquisitor Alessandro Novello had given to the convent. By 1304 he was a custos in the Franciscan province of Venice. On 5 October, he was present in the church of San Francesco in Treviso to witness the agreement ending the Salt War between Padua and Venice.

Between 1305 and 1308, Paolino was an inquisitor in the March of Treviso. In 1307–1308, he was investigated by the canonist Giovanni d'Andrea and the legate Guillaume de Balait after he was accused by Ainardo da Ceneda of accepting bribes. He allegedly spent the money on parchment and books. By March 1308, he was again lecturing in Venice. On 24 October, Guillaume de Balait authorized Bishop Pagano della Torre to release Paolino from his excommunication if he repaid 300 gold florins by Christmas.

=== Diplomat ===
Paolino is not mentioned in any source for the next seven years. On 22 September 1315, he is listed as a citizen of the commune of Treviso. In 1315–1316 and 1320, he was the diplomatic representative of the Republic of Venice to the court of King Robert of Naples. The first mission, coming while Venice was under interdict for its part in the War of Ferrara, resulted in a treaty between Venice and Naples. It was Paolino's first visit to Naples. The second mission took him to Provence, where Robert was staying. He secured compensation for damages inflicted on a Venetian ship by Genoese pirates, Genoa being under Robert's rule at the time.

Around 1321, Paolino was named to the Apostolic Penitentiary, then at Avignon in Provence. He was also made a papal chaplain. On 24 September 1321, Paolino was charged by Pope John XXII with examining the Liber secretorum fidelium crucis, a treatise on a new crusade submitted by Marino Sanudo Torsello. Paolino and three others examined the work in Paolino's house in Avignon. From 1322 to 1326, Paolino served as the papal ambassador to Venice. In this capacity, he also dealt with the Visconti of Milan, the Este of Ferrara and the city of Fano, which were all under Venetian protection and papal interdict at the time. His first mission was to end hostilities between Venice and Rimini. His second was to Ferrara, which was then in revolt against the papal rule.

=== Bishop ===
In 1324, Paolino was elected bishop of Pozzuoli in the Kingdom of Naples, possibly through intervention of the king. He was consecrated by Cardinal Bertrand de la Tour. He did not arrive in Pozzuoli until 1326, after his last diplomatic mission to Venice. From 1328 until his death, he served as an important advisor on the royal council. There is relatively little information on his activities as bishop. Several letters he received from Marino Sanudo survive from this time. It was also during this period that he met Giovanni Boccaccio in Naples. He exerted and important influence on the Florentine's "intellectual development and his exposure to the non-Christian world."

Paolino divided his time as bishop between Pozzuoli and the royal court in Naples. He died at Pozzuoli in 1344. The date of death is not known, but it took place before 22 June, the date of a papal inventory of his belongings. In accordance with the papal right of spoil, some of his books made their way to the Papal Library in Avignon.

== Works ==
=== Trattato de regimine rectoris ===
Paolino's earliest work is Trattato de regimine rectoris ('treatise on the conduct of a lord'). It is a treatise on government of the mirror for princes genre. It was written between 1313 and 1315 in Venetian (with a Latin prologue) and dedicated to the Venetian duke of Candia, a member of the Badoer family named Marino. It is divided into three sections on governing oneself, governing one's family and political governance. Its structure and content are based on the De regimine principum of Giles of Rome or possibly on the French translation by Henri de Gauchi. Compared to Giles, Paolino is pithy and practical.

=== Universal chronicles ===
Paolino wrote three universal chronicles in Latin. He worked on the project from 1306 to 1331. In chronological order the three are the Epithoma, Compendium and Satirica.

- The Notabilium historiarum Epithoma ('epitome of notable histories') runs from Creation to the death of the Emperor Henry VII in 1313. Completed before 1316, it is the most traditional of the three and is based on Vincent of Beauvais's Speculum historiale. It is preserved in four 14th-century manuscripts, all now in Florence.
- The Compendium or Chronologia magna ('great chronology') covers the same period as the Epithoma with the addition of a section on Outremer, a mappa mundi and a map of the Holy Land. It was completed between 1321 and 1323, but updated later. It survives in both long and short versions in five manuscripts, including what is probably an autograph, Biblioteca Marciana MS lat. 399. There also survives a translation and adaptation in Old Occitan. The Occitan version, L'Abreujamen de las estorias, survives in a single manuscript Egerton MS 1500 that was produced in Avignon between 1321 and 1324.
- The Satirica rerum gestarum ('satyricon of the deeds of the world') runs from Creation to 1320. It is divided into 238 chapters. Paolino finished working on it only after his election as bishop. It differs from the others by the inclusion of some saints' lives, notably that of Francis of Assisi, and an account of Pietro da Macerata and Pietro da Fossombrone, founders of the Fraticelli, whom Paolino regarded as heretics. It is preserved in four 14th-century and five 15th-century manuscripts. The manuscript Vat. lat. 1960 in the Vatican Library includes a notice of the martyrdom of Thomas of Tolentino in India in 1321.

The impetus for Paolino to write an expanded version of his Epithoma, which resulted in the Compendium and Satirica, was his meeting with Marino Sanudo and his review of Sanudo's Liber secretorum, which resulted in a correspondence between the two. These interactions broadened Paolino's geographical scope.

No complete edition of any of the chronicles exists, owing in part to the complexity of the manuscripts, which are replete with large tables. Certain excerpts have been extracted and published separately.

Paolino was widely used as a source in the 14th and 15th centuries. His contemporary, Andrea Dandolo, cites the Satirica in his Chronica per extensum descripta. He was also used by Poggio Bracciolini, Coluccio Salutati and Jan Długosz. Boccaccio had a mixed opinion of Paolino as a historian. In the eighth chapter of Book XIV of his Genealogie deorum gentilium, published around 1363, he praised him, but he left critical remarks in his own copy of Paolino's Compendium. He considered him often to be, in the words of Roberta Morosini, "confused and ignorant". Nonetheless, he copied the account of the life of Muḥammad in Paolino's Satirica into one of his notebooks, the Zibaldone Magliabechiano, under the title De Maumeth propheta Saracenorum.

The Epithoma and Satirica today are not highly valued for their historical information. The Compendium, however, does contain some valuable information on early Franciscan history.

The so-called fifth biography of Pope Clement V (1305–1314) and the fourth of John XXII (1316–1334) are in fact extracts from the Satirica that circulated independently.

=== Ecclesiastical writings ===
Paolino's works on the Franciscans are more valuable today as sources of information than his universal chronicles. His Provinciale ordinis fratrum minorum catalogues the provinces, custodies and convents of the contemporary Franciscan order. It was produced around 1334. Paolino is probably also responsible for compiling the Liber privilegiorum ordinis Minorum found in the manuscript Pontificia Biblioteca Antoniana, MS 49. Written around 1323, it contains copies of papal privileges granted to the Franciscans.

Paolino also wrote an outline of the ecclesiastical provinces and diocese subject to Rome, entitled Provinciale Romanae curiae.

=== Short writings ===
Paolino wrote four standalone treatises as supplements to the Satirica, to which they were usually appended: De mapa mundi ('on world maps'), De ludo scachorum ('on the game of chess'), De diis gentium et fabulis poetarum ('on the gods of the pagans and the fables of the poets') and De providentia et fortuna ('on providence and fate').

== Bibliography ==
=== Editions ===
- Eubel, Konrad, ed. (1892). Provinciale ordinis fratrum minorum. Florence: Quaracchi.
- Mussafia, Adolfo, ed. (1868). Trattato de regimine rectoris di Fra Paolino Minorita. Vienna and Florence.

=== Secondary literature ===
- Anderson, David (1996). "Fra Paolino's 'De Providentia et fortuna'". Das Mittelalter. 1 (1): 51–74. doi:10.1524/mial.1996.1.1.51. S2CID 171003084.
- Botana, Federico (2013). "The Making of L'Abreujamen de las estorias (Egerton MS. 1500)" (PDF). Electronic British Library Journal. 17: 1–32.
- Bruni, Gerardo (1935). "Paolino Minorita". Enciclopedia Italiana. Vol. 26: Paleo–Pete. Rome: Istituto della Enciclopedia Italiana.
- Cecchini, Francesca (1998). "Paolino Veneto". Enciclopedia dell'Arte Medievale. Vol. 9: Osso–Ribāṭ. Rome: Istituto della Enciclopedia Italiana.
- Daniel, E. Randolph (2010). "Paulinus of Venice". In Graeme Dunphy (ed.). Encyclopedia of the Medieval Chronicle. Vol. 2: J–Z. Leiden: Brill. pp. 1193–1194.
- Fontana, Emanuele (2014). "Paolino da Venezia, vescovo di Pozzuoli". Dizionario Biografico degli Italiani (in Italian). Vol. 81: Pansini–Pazienza. Rome: Institute of the Italian Encyclopaedia. ISBN 978-88-12-00032-6.
- Ghinato, Alberto (1951). Fr. Paolino da Venezia O.F.M., vescovo di Pozzuoli († 1344). Rome.
- Ibarz, Alexander (2013). "The Provenance of the Abreujamens de las estorias (London, British Library, Egerton MS. 1500) and the Identification of Scribal Hands (c. 1323)". Electronic British Library Journal. 17: 1–26.
- Lea, Henry Charles (2010) [1888]. A History of the Inquisition of the Middle Ages. Vol. 2. Cambridge University Press.
- Lock, Peter, ed. (2016) [2011]. Marino Sanudo Torsello, The Book of the Secrets of the Faithful of the Cross: Liber Secretorum Fidelium Crucis. New York and Oxford: Routledge.
- Menache, Sophia (1998). Clement V. Cambridge: Cambridge University Press.
- Miller, Suzanne Mariko (2007). Venice in the East Adriatic: Experiences and Experiments in Colonial Rule in Dalmatia and Istria (c. 1150–1358) (PhD dissertation). Stanford University.
- Mollat, Guillaume (1917). Étude critique sur les Vitae Paparum Avenionensium d'Étienne Baluze. Paris: Letouzey.
- Morosini, Roberta (2013). "Giovanni Boccaccio". In David Thomas; Alex Mallett (eds.). Christian–Muslim Relations: A Bibliographical History. Vol. 5 (1350–1500). Leiden: Brill. pp. 76–87. doi:10.1163/1877-8054_cmri_COM_24574.
- Morosini, Roberta; Ciccuto, Marcello, eds. (2020). Paolino Veneto: Storico, Narratore e Geografo. Rome: L'Erma di Bretschneider.
- Smith, J. J. (2003). "Paulinus of Venice". New Catholic Encyclopedia. Vol. 11: Pau–Red (2nd ed.). Farmington Hills, MI: Gale. p. 39.
- von den Brincken, Anna-Dorothee (2000). "Paulinus Minorita of Venice". In John Block Friedman; Kristen Mossler Figg (eds.). Trade, Travel, and Exploration in the Middle Ages: An Encyclopedia. New York: Routledge. pp. 470–472.
