= Scicon Sports =

Italian cycling equipment company

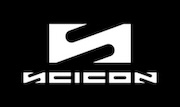
- Company type: Subsidiary
- Industry: Sporting goods
- Founded: 1980; 46 years ago in Veneto, Italy
- Founders: Luciano Fantin, Claudio Fantin
- Headquarters: Mussolente, Veneto, Italy
- Area served: Worldwide
- Key people: Heinrich Dannhauser (CEO)
- Products: Bike travel bags, cycling performance eyewear, cycling accessories, clothing
- Owner: ASG International
- Parent: ASG International
- Website: sciconsports.com

Scicon Sports (Pronunciation: [ˈʃiːkɒn]; styled Scicon) is an Italian sporting goods company that designs and markets bike travel bags and cases, cycling performance eyewear, backpacks, cycling clothing and related cycling accessories. The company was founded in 1980 in Veneto, region of northern Italy and is known mainly for its Aerocomfort bike travel bag, introduced as an early design intended to allow bicycles to be transported by air with limited disassembly.

Since 2011, the brand has been owned by ASG International, an Italy-based holding company. Scicon expanded beyond bike travel bags into performance cycling eyewear in 2019. The company supplies eyewear and bike travel bags to professional road cycling teams, including UAE Team Emirates XRG , whose rider Tadej Pogačar has worn Scicon eyewear in competition since 2020.

== History ==
=== Founding and early products ===
Scicon Sports was founded in 1980 near Bassano del Grappa in Veneto, Italy. Its founders, Luciano Fantin and Claudio Fantin, developed an early bicycle travel bag, the Aerocomfort, intended to reduce the disassembly required to transport a bicycle by aircraft. The product was adopted by professional cyclist for travel to international races.

=== ASG International ownership ===
In 2011 the Scicon Sports brand come under the ownership of ASG International, a holding company based in Italy and led by Heinrich Dannhauser. Under ASG International, the company expanded its distribution and e-commerce operations and continued to develop the Aerocomfort bike travel bag range.

=== Expansion into cycling performance eyewear ===
In 2019 Scicon launched a performance cycling eyewear range, entering a product category that placed it alongside established eyewear brands. In 2020 the company began supplying eyewear to the UCI WorldTeam UAE Team Emirates-XGR. In 2025 Scicon introduced the prescription eyewear range.

=== Recent products ===
In March 2026 Scicon released the Aeroshade 2.0 Titanium eyewear model, featuring titanium temples designed to improve stability at speed The model was worn by Tadej Pogačar at the Strade Bianche one-day race on the day of its release.

== Products ==
=== Bike travel bags ===
Scicon's bike travel bags are designed to protect bicycles during air, train and other transport. The principal range is the Aerocomfort, a semi-rigid bag that allows a bicycle to be packed with limited disassembly. The range includes variants for road, gravel, mtb and triathlon bicycles, and a hard case marketed as Aerotech. The company also produces lighter soft travel bags for any kind of journeys.

=== Cycling eyewear ===
Scicon's eyewear range, introduced in 2019, includes performance cycling sunglasses developed in close collaboration with professional riders. Some key models include Aeroshade Kunken, Aeroshade XL, Aeroscope, Aerojet, Aerotrail and Aerowing, offered with a range of lens options including photochromic lenses. The Aeroshade 2.0 Titanium, released in 2026, is an evolution of the Aeroshade model featuring titanium temples designed to improve stability at speed.

In 2024 Scicon announced a development plan for prescription cycling sunglasses, engineering its eyewear frames to accommodate corrective lenses including high prescriptions. The range covers lifestyle sunglasses, optical inserts and performance eyewear.

=== Accessories ===
Scicon Sports also markets cycling apparel and accessories that complement its bike travel bags and cycling performance eyewear.

== Sponsorship ==
Scicon supplies eyewear and bike travel bags to professional road cycling teams. Its longest-running current partnership is with UAE Team Emirates XRG, which it has supplied since 2020. Team rider Tadej Pogačar has worn SCICON eyewear during his professional career, including at multiple Grand Tours and one-day classics.

The company has also produced Tour de France themed editions of its Aerocomfort bike travel bag.

== Reception ==
Scicon's Aerocomfort bike travel bag has been reviewed by cycling media. Cycling Weekly included the Aerocomfort 3.0 in its 2026 guide to bike bags and boxes, noting it for ease of use and the limited disassembly it requires for air travel.

The Aeroshade 2.0 Titanium, released in March 2026, was covered by cycling publications across multiple countries at launch, including outlets in the United States, the United Kingdom, France, Japan, Spain, Germany, Italy, the Netherlands, Belgium, Sweden, Portugal, Slovakia, Poland and Turkey.
