= Alessandro Novello =

Franciscan bishop of Feltre and Belluno

Alessandro Novello (c. 1250 – February 1320) was the Franciscan bishop of Feltre and Belluno from 1298 until his death.

Novello was born at Treviso in the early 1250s. His brother Prosapio Novello was the bishop of Treviso from 1279. Alessandro entered the Franciscan order at Treviso and served as a papal inquisitor in the March of Treviso in 1293–1296. He was consecrated bishop of the united dioceses of Belluno and Feltre in Rome on 20 April 1298. Later that year he received from Patriarch Raimondo della Torre investiture with the temporalities of his double see. Thereafter, he is always designated "bishop and count" in official documents.

As bishop, Novello is best remembered for an episode mentioned by Dante Alighieri in his Paradiso, 9:51–60, the so-called difalta (error). In July 1314, at the request of Pino della Tosa, the governor of Ferrara, Novello handed over some Ghibelline refugees from Ferrara who were under his protection. Antoniolo, Lancilotto and Claruccio da Fontana and their associates, thirty men in total, were publicly beheaded by Della Tosa. Dante puts in the mouth of Cunizza a prophecy of the suffering that will come to Feltre because of its "wicked shepherd" (l'empio pastor).

Novello's temporal powers were gradually restricted by the powerful Da Camino, to the point where in 1318 he abandoned his diocese and took refuge with his nephew Zaffone in Treviso. A late and unreliable tradition claims that he entered the Franciscan convent at Portogruaro. Giorgio Piloni recorded seeing his tomb and epitaph there in 1607, but it was not there in 1820 and the building was destroyed in 1880.

Novello died in February 1320. According to Benvenuto da Imola, he was beaten to death with sacks of sand, such was the enduring hostility for his difalta.

== Bibliography ==
- Alpago-Novello, Luigi [in Italian] (1931). "Il vescovo della pretesa 'diffalta', Alessandro Novello". Archivio Veneto. 10: 158–221.
- Benson, Pamela J. (2010) [2000]. "Alessandro Novello". In Richard Lansing (ed.). The Dante Encyclopedia. New York: Routledge. p. 14.
- Bosco, Umberto [in Italian], ed. (1970). "Alessandro Novello". Enciclopedia Dantesca. Vol. 1. Rome: Istituto dell'Enciclopedia Italiana. pp. 492–493.
- Canzian, Dario (2013). "Novello, Alessandro". Dizionario Biografico degli Italiani (in Italian). Vol. 78: Natta–Nurra. Rome: Istituto dell'Enciclopedia Italiana. ISBN 978-88-12-00032-6.
- Raffa, Guy P. (2009). The Complete Danteworlds: A Reader's Guide to the Divine Comedy. Chicago and London: University of Chicago Press.
- Toynbee, Paget (1968). A Dictionary of Proper Names and Notable Matters in the Works of Dante. Oxford: Oxford University Press.
