= Peire Guilhem =

Peire Guilhem or Guillem may refer to:

- Peire Guilhem de Luserna, troubadour
- Peire Guillem de Tolosa, troubadour
