= Ezzelino II da Romano =

Italian nobleman (d. 1235)

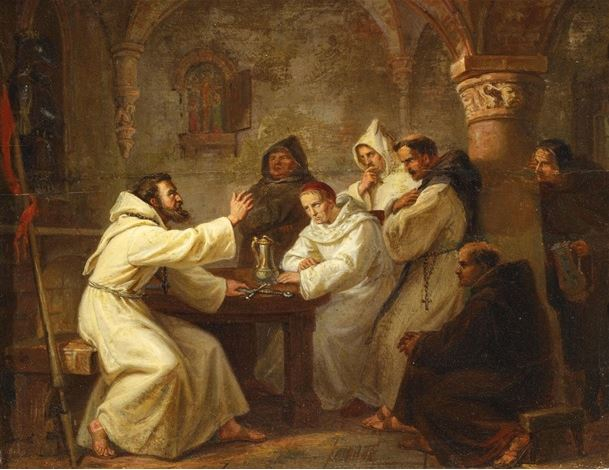
Ezzelino da Romano Recites his Heroic Deeds at the Monastery of Saint Anthony of Padua; painting by Carl Wilhelm Kolbe

Ezzelino II da Romano, also known as Ezzelino il Monaco ("Ezzelino the Monk"; died 1235) was an Italian nobleman of the Ezzelini family, who was lord of Onara (until 1199), Romano, Bassano and Godego.

== Biography ==
The son of Ezzelino I, in 1182 he fought for lands belonging to the monks of a monastery in Sesto al Reghena. On 24 April 1198, Pope Innocent III asked Pellegrinus II, Patriarch of Aquileia to resolve the matter and to lift the excommunication which Ezzelino had received from the patriarch of Grado.

In 1191-1193, Ezzelino was podestà of Treviso, and later of Verona (1200). Ezzelino raised an army to expel Azzo VI of Este after the latter became podestà of Verona in 1207.

In 1199, his castle at Onara was destroyed by the Paduans after Ezzelino had signed a separate peace with Vicenza; he therefore moved the family residence to Romano, by which name his family would be known in the following decades. In 1209-1210 he was among the followers of emperor Otto IV, who gave him possession of Bassano (1211). Ezzelino II became podestà of Vicenza in 1211.

In 1212, Ezzelino II clashed near Verona with the troops of the Lombard League; the latter was defeated and its commander, Azzo VI d'Este, perished. In 1213 he fought with Padua against the Estensi and, the following year, against the Venetians.

In 1221, Ezzelino retreated into a monastery at Oliero in Valstagna and then at Campese, hence his surname of Monaco ("monk"), leaving the administration of the fiefs to his sons Ezzelino and Alberico da Romano. His daughter Cunizza da Romano was married to Riccardo di San Bonifacio, lord of Verona.

He died in the monastery of Campese in 1235.

== Sources ==
- Dean, Trevor (1999). "The rise of the signori". In Abulafia, David (ed.). The New Cambridge Medieval History (Vol. 5): c.1198-c.1300. Cambridge University Press. ISBN 978-0521362894.
- Rapisarda, Mario (1965). La signoria di Ezzelino da Romano. Udine.
