= Casella (Divine Comedy) =

13th-century Italian composer

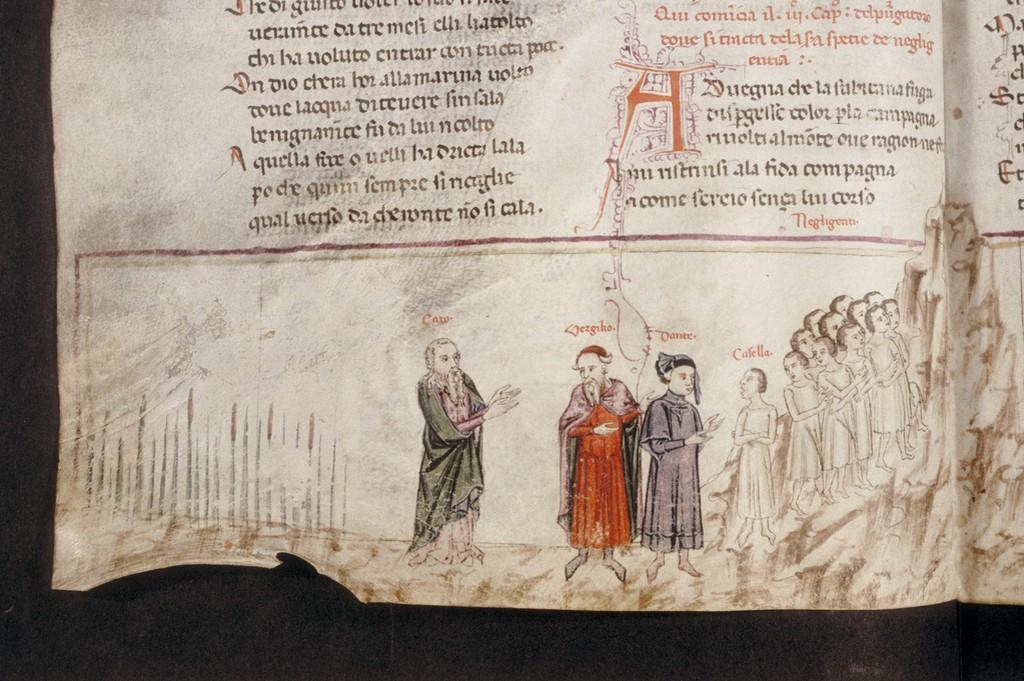
14th-century Italian manuscript illustration of Casella conversing with Dante (right), while Virgil and Cato are speaking (left)

Casella (died before 1300) was an Italian composer and singer, none of whose works has survived.

== Biographical fragments and identity ==
He was probably a friend of Dante Alighieri who made him into the main character of the 2nd canto of the Purgatorio (the second part of the Divine Comedy).

All that is positively known about him is what is found in Dante's work and it has been impossible to identify him with absolute certainty with any of the Casellas named in contemporary documents.

To whatever is said of him in Dante's work one can add (with some degree of probability) information furnished by the earliest commentators of the Divine Comedy: Pietro di Dante, Benvenuto da Imola, Buti and Landino give him as being born in Florence, while an anonymous early commentary of the Divine Comedy gives him as being born in Pistoia.

Potential mentions of this Casella in other documents include a mention in Codex Vaticano 3214 (Casella dedit sonum, i.e. "Casella set [this] to music") that he set to music a madrigal by Lemmo da Pistoia, and a mention of him in a sonnet by Niccolò de' Rossi. There is also a document denoting that Casella might have received a fine in July 1282.

Casella died in 1299 or early in the year 1300, since Dante enters Purgatory in 1300.

From what is said of him in Purgatorio, Canto II, it appears that he was a friend of Dante, and that he set to music poetry by Dante himself, namely the canzone Amor che ne la mente mi ragiona found in Dante's Convivio and possibly some other short poems by Dante. Specifically, in line 107 of the Canto II, it might be inferred that the amoroso canto ("amorous song") that Dante connects with Casella is a specific indication that Casella's music was (at least in part) in the monodic style which accompanied Occitan lyric poems, or Italian lyric poems in the Occitan manner.

== Role in the Divine Comedy ==
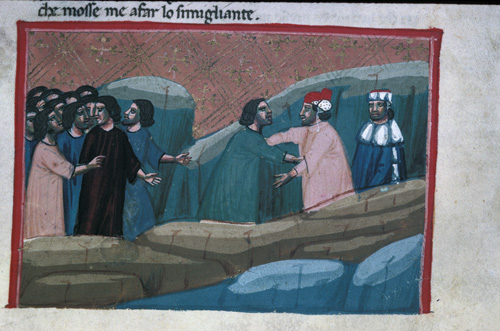
Dante and Casella in an early 14th-century Italian manuscript (Egerton 943 f. 65v)

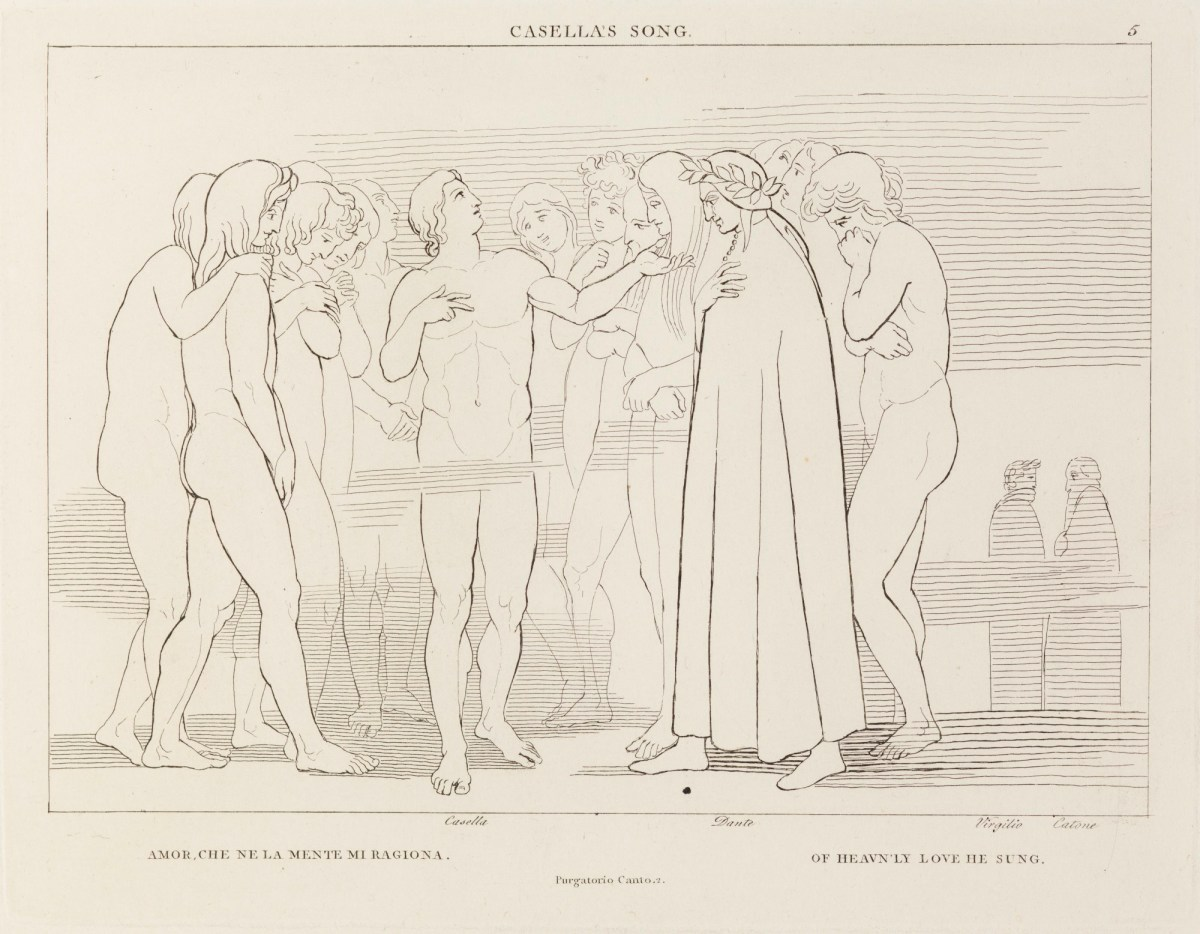
Casella's Song by John Flaxman, engraved By Thomas Piroli

Casella appears among the dead entering Purgatory in the Divine Comedy, and embraces Dante upon recognizing him. It is implied that there is mutual familiarity and a potential close friendship between them.

"I saw one of them come forward

with such affection to embrace me

that I was moved to do the same."

—Purgatorio, Canto II, Lines 76-78

Subsequently, Dante identifies Casella by name and asks him to sing. Casella's singing is referred to as characteristically sweet by Dante. Casella begins to sing the first lines of a Amor che ne la mente mi ragiona, a poem written by Dante himself.

"'Love that converses with me in my mind,'

he then began, so sweetly

that the sweetness sounds within me still."

—Purgatorio, Canto II, Lines 112-114

== Sources ==
- Boyde, Patrick (2001). "Casella". Grove Music Online. Oxford: Oxford University Press. doi:10.1093/gmo/9781561592630.article.05079. ISBN 978-1-56159-263-0. (subscription, Wikilibrary access, or UK public library membership required)
- Economou, George D. (Fall 1992). "Saying Spirit in Terms of Matter: The Epic Embrace in Medieval Poetic Imagination". Lectura Dantis (2): 72–79. JSTOR 44806492.
- Economou, George D. (2010) [2000]. "Casella". In Lansing, Richard (ed.). The Dante Encyclopedia. London and New York: Routledge.
- Freccero, John (1973). "Casella's Song (Purg. II, 112)". Dante Studies, with the Annual Report of the Dante Society. 91 (91): 73–80. JSTOR 40166155.
- Levitan, Alan (1985). "Dante as Listener, Cato's Rebuke, and Virgil's Self-Reproach". Dante Studies, with the Annual Report of the Dante Society (103): 37–55. JSTOR 40166406.
- Peirone, Luigi (1970). "Casella". Enciclopedia Dantesca (in Italian). Vol. 64. Treccani.
- Peterson, Thomas E. (10 December 2018). "From Casella to Cacciaguida: A Musical Progression Toward Innocence". Bibliotheca Dantesca: Journal of Dante Studies. 1 (12): 219–232. Archived from the original on March 30, 2019.
- Ruud, Jay (2008). Critical Companion to Dante. New York: Facts On File, Incorporated. ISBN 978-0-8160-6521-9.
