= Andrea da Murano =

Italian painter

Andrea da Murano, also known as Andrea di Giovanni (active 1463 to 1502) was an Italian painter, active mainly in Venice and the Venetian mainland.

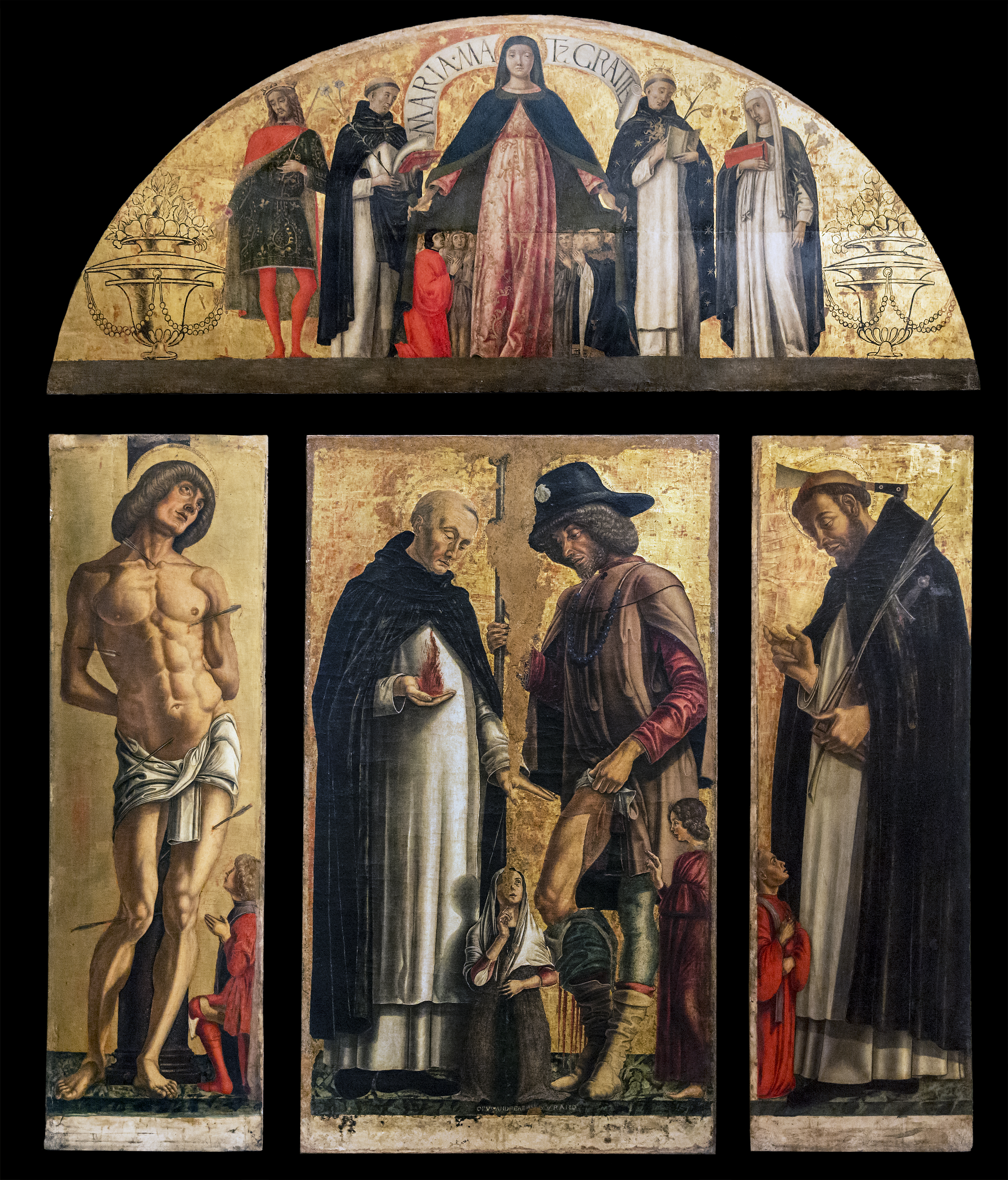
Polyptych Gallerie dell'Accademia

== Biography ==
In 1468, he was given, along with Bartolomeo Vivarini, a commission for painting a canvas for the Scuola di San Marco. In 1472, he is known to have had a studio with his brother, the engraver Girolamo, located in the neighborhood of Santa Maria Formosa. He painted an altarpiece for the church of Santa Maria di Trebaseleghe in Treviso. In 1499, he was living in Castelfranco. In 1502 he painted an altarpiece for the parish church of Mussolente in the province of Vicenza.

A triptych depicting Saints Sebastian, Vincent Ferrer, Roch, and four others with St Peter and the Madonna della Misericordia (1475) is attributed to Andrea and found in the Gallerie dell'Accademia of Venice, deriving from the church of San Pietro Martire of Murano.
