= Arnaut Plagues =

Arnaut Plagues

Arnaut Plagues or Plages (fl. c. 1230–1245) was a troubadour probably from Provence.

Only one song of his survives, a tenso with the trobairitz Felipa, Ben volgra midons saub(r)es. Though this song has also been attributed to Peirol and Peire Rogier, textual evidence and the bulk of manuscripts seem to point to Arnaut. A line that reads hom plagues ("one would be pleased") seems to be a play on Arnaut's name. Intertextually the dialogue has some commonalities with the work of Falquet de Romans (1212–1220), who travelled in Provence and Lombardy. The exchange between Arnaut and the trobairitz is difficult to follow, however, because the chansonniers do not clearly mark the beginning and end of stanzas.

Uc de Saint Circ composed a song, Messonget, un sirventes, that acknowledges that it is written to el son d'en Arnaut Plagues ("the melody of lord Arnaut Plagues [from Ben volgra]"). When Uc composed this (1226 or 1245) would provide the only concrete date for Arnaut's life. Arnaut's melody was also used by other troubadours but despite its popularity, it has been lost to us.

Arnaut Plagues has sometimes been confused with Arnaut Catalan, who composed a humorous bilingual tenso with Alfonso X of Castile while entertaining at his court.
