= Albert I of Pietengau =

Albert I Count of Pietengau (* around 1215; † 9 December 1260/62) was Bishop of Regensburg from 1246 to 1259.

== Family ==
Albert's father was Count Gottfried von Sigmaringen-Helfenstein and his mother was Adelheid von Neuffen, daughter of Count Berthold I of Weissenhorn-Neuffen-Achalm-Hettingen. Albert, as well as his two brothers, Count Gebhard von Sigmaringen-Pietengau and Count Berthold von Pietengau, wrote to a place not yet determined, Byedingowe, Bitengowe, Pietengaw, Petinkeu, Peutengau or Pietengau (possibly Peiting).

== Life ==
Albert enjoyed a canon at Halberstadt when, in 1246, the Cardinal Legate, Philip of Ferrara, surrendered the suffrage of the cathedral chapter to the Regensburg chair, which had been completed by Bishop Siegfried's death. Now he brought his brethren, Gebhard and Berthold, whom he made to the Vizedom of the Hochstift, and who owed his influence to the election to Bishop of Passau in 1250.

Albert was a willing organ of the curia in her measures against Duke Otto II of Bavaria, was in touch with the Bohemian king Ottokar II, and fought from his fortress Stauf the imperial citizenship of Regensburg. Albert attempted to murder King Conrad IV of Germany by his Ministeriales Konrad von Hohenfels on the night of 29 December 1250, when he was in Regensburg. The bishop and the city are still in dispute with Bavaria. The occasion for his abdication might have been the reconciliation between Duke Ludwig and the citizens, which might render his position untenable. Albert contented himself with a few bursaries in the diocese and went to the Cistercian monastery of Sittichenbach near Querfurt.
