= Paola Drigo =

Italian writer

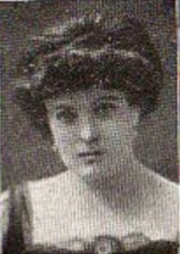
- Born: Paolina Valeria Maria Bianchetti; 4 January 1876; Castelfranco Veneto, Italy
- Died: 4 January 1938 (aged 62); Padua, Italy
- Occupation: Writer
- Spouse: Giulio Giovanni Drigo (m. 1898; died 1922)
- Children: Paolo Drigo

Paola (née Bianchetti) Drigo (4 January 1876 – 4 January 1938) was an Italian writer of short stories, novellas, and novels. Her first collection of short stories, La fortuna, was published in 1913 and caught the attention of literary critics and the public. Her last major works were two novels, Fine d'anno and Maria Zef, both published in 1936. With a style rooted in 19th century Italian realism, she was admired for the detailed psychological analysis of her characters and her descriptions of provincial life in her native Veneto region. The protagonists of her stories (usually women) were people of humble origin or those who had been "humiliated by fate".

== Life ==
Drigo was born Paolina Valeria Maria Bianchetti in Castelfranco Veneto. Her father was Count Giuseppe Valerio Bianchetti who had fought with Garibaldi, later becoming a minor literary and political figure. Her mother, Luigia Anna Loro Bianchetti, was the daughter of a lawyer and member of the Italian Parliament. Paolino was educated first at the Liceo Canova in Treviso, where she was the first female student in the school's history, and she completed her studies in Padua.

In 1898 she married the engineer and agronomist Giulio Giovanni Drigo. Her first and only surviving child, their son Paolo, was born a year later. A daughter soon followed but died only a few days after her birth, an episode later alluded to in Drigo's autobiographical novel, Fine d'anno. The couple initially lived in a palazzo on the Piazza del Santo in Padua but in 1900 moved to Mussolente where Giulio had bought the Ca' Soderini, a large villa and farming estate with one of the largest and most important parks in the Veneto region. Until the beginning of the First World War, Paola Drigo spent the winter seasons in Rome where she was active in several literary salons. By 1912 her stories and novellas began to appear in La Lettura (published by the Corriere della Sera). Her first collection of stories, La fortuna, was published by Emilio Treves in 1913. The favorable reaction of both critics and the public led to regular collaborations with two other Italian literary magazines, Nuova Antologia and L'Illustrazione Italiana.

With the outbreak of the First World War in 1914, she returned to Mussolente. Another collection of stories, Codino, was published in 1918. Although she continued to contribute stories and articles to several Italian periodicals, she published no further books until 1932. The intervening years were marked by an increasingly strained relationship with her son and by her husband's lengthy and debilitating illness. After his death in 1922, she assumed the administration of their estate while making frequent trips to Rome, Milan, and Padua. Her third collection of stories, La signorina Anna, was published in 1932, followed in 1936 by the publication of her only novels, Fine d'anno and Maria Zef.

She eventually settled in Padua, and spent her final year there. Suffering from depression and a severe gastric ulcer which caused frequent violent hemorrhages, she was largely confined to her bed in a room overlooking the Bacchiglione River. Her last piece, "Finistre sul fiume" ("Windows on the River"), published in the Corriere della Sera on 18 August 1937 was written from her hospital bed. The tale's protagonist reflects on her illness and impending death. The piece ends with:

No, I'm not ready yet. O my God, let me stay here a little longer.

Paola Drigo died in Padua six months later on her 62nd birthday. She was buried near her villa in Mussolente, attended by a few relatives and her close friend the poet and writer, Manara Valgimigli. After the funeral Valgimigli wrote to their mutual friend Pietro Pancrazi:

In these days I have often thought about our friend's harsh death and her strong will to live. If I were sure that it was praise, I would say that she was a woman who was truly a man.

== Works ==
Short story collections

- La fortuna. Milan: Treves, 1913
- Codino. Milan: Treves, 1918
- La signorina Anna. Vicenza: Jacchia, 1932

Novels

- Fine d'anno. Milan: Treves, 1936
- Maria Zef. Milan: Treves, 1936

Non-fiction

- "Canova e il suo paese" (Canova and his Country) in Italia!, 4 April 1913
- Andreas Hofer e il suo paese" (Andreas Hofer and his Country) in Noi e il Mondo, 11 November 1922
- "Libri, arte e donne" (Books, Art, and Women) in Gazzetta di Venezia, 17 April 1923
- "Il baffo e la chioma" (The Mustache and the Hair) in Gazzetta di Venezia, 24 June 1927
- "Uomini di genio e donne intellettuali. Egoismo, crudeltà e amore. Il punto di vista femminile" (Men of Genius and Intellectual Women. Egotism, Cruelty, and Love. The Feminine Point of View) in Nuova Antologia, 1 June 1931
- "Femminismo e femminilità" (Feminism and Femininity) in Nuova Antologia, 1 August 1931
- "Lettere del Carducci e di Alberto Mario a Valerio Bianchetti" (The Letters of Carducci and Alberto Mario to Valerio Bianchetti) in Pègaso, 3 March 1931

Modern curated editions of Drigo's fiction

- Fine d'anno (edited by Patrizia Zambon). Lanciano: Rocco Carabba, 2005
- Finestre sul fiume (edited by Sandro Bortone). Santa Lucia ai Monti (Verona): Edizioni Ampersand, 1995
- Maria Zef (edited by Paola Azzolini and Patrizia Zambon). Padua: Il Poligrafo, 2011
- Maria Zef (in English translation with notes and introduction by Blossom Steinberg Kirschenbaum). Lincoln, Nebraska: University of Nebraska Press, 1989
- Racconti (edited by Patrizia Zambon). Padua: Il Poligrafo, 2006
