= Mussolente =

- Comune
- Comune di Mussolente
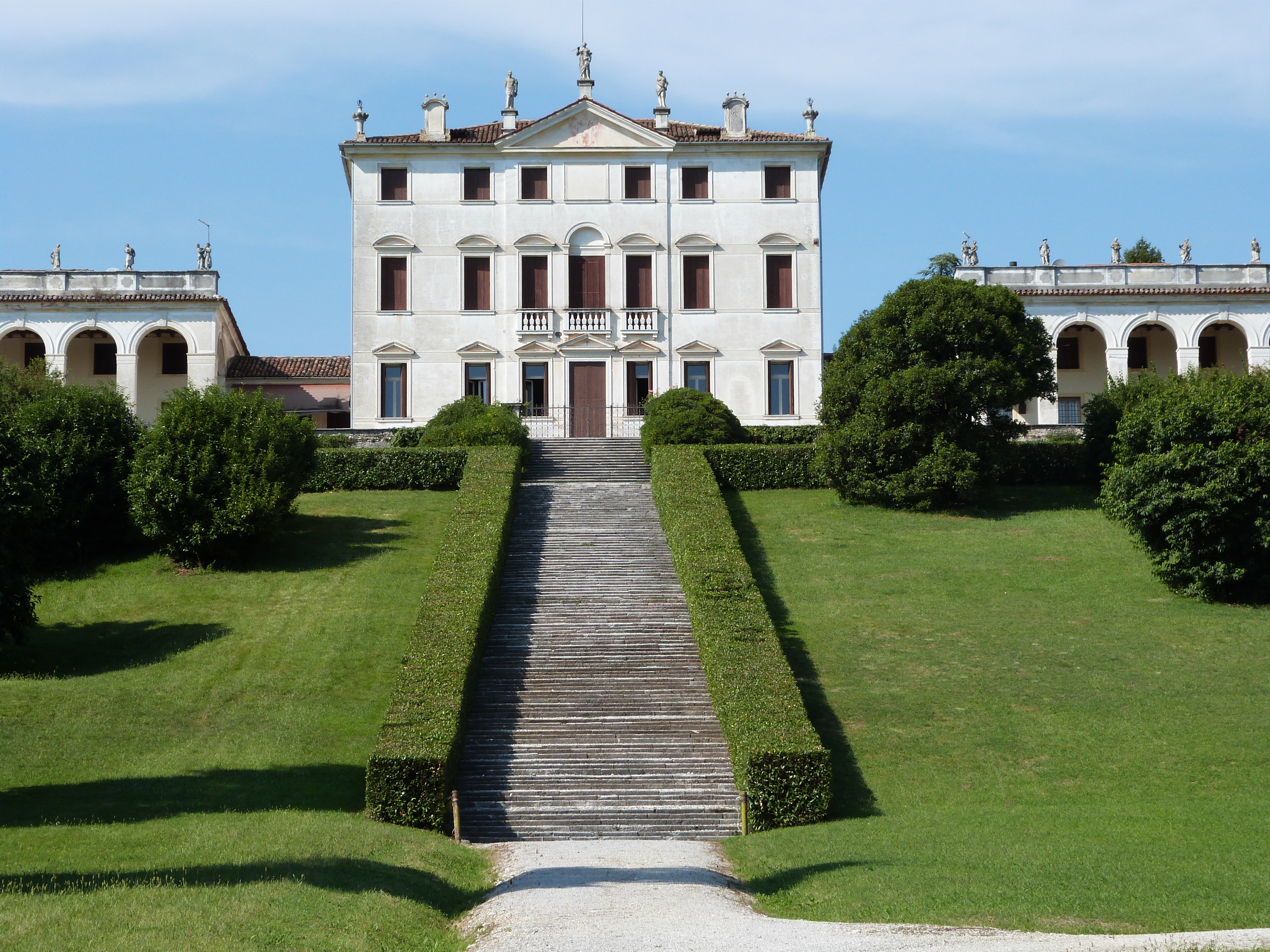
- Villa Negri Piovene

- Location within Italy Location within Veneto
- Coordinates: 45°47′N 11°49′E
- Country: Italy
- Region: Veneto
- Province: Vicenza (VI)
- Frazioni: Casoni

Government
  - Mayor: Cristiano Montagner

Area
  - Total: 15.43 km^{2} (5.96 sq mi)
- Elevation: 117 m (384 ft)

Population (30 November 2017)
  - Total: 7,621
  - Density: 493.9/km^{2} (1,279/sq mi)
- Demonym: Misquilesi
- Time zone: UTC+1 (CET)
  - Summer (DST): UTC+2 (CEST)
- Postal code: 36065
- Dialing code: 0424
- Patron saint: SS. Pietro e Paolo
- Saint day: 29 June
- Website: Official website

Mussolente is a town in the province of Vicenza, Veneto, northern Italy. It is north of SS248 state road.

== History ==
Mussolente consists of two distinct zones: a hilly area in the northern part and flatlands with an abundance of water in the southern part. For centuries, the hilly area to the north was dominant in the town's development. In the 2nd millennium BC it had been occupied by groups of shepherds and wool spinners. There is archeological evidence from the 6th and 5th centuries BC that a settled community of Venetic people had been established there. Beginning in the 3rd century BC, the area gradually came under Roman domination. The demonym "Misquilesi" for the locality's residents is thought to derive from the Roman period on the basis of the inscription on a Roman soldier's tomb found in nearby Borso del Grappa referring to the "paganis misquilen" ("Misquiline people"). The period of Roman colonization coincided with increasing settlement and agricultural use of the flatlands to the south.

With the fall of the Western Roman Empire and the subsequent Barbarian invasions, the flatlands were gradually abandoned as the inhabitants sought refuge in the hilly area which was more easily defended. By the middle of the 10th century AD the town was ruled by the prince-bishops of Belluno. In 1149, the Bishop of Belluno conferred the fief of Mussolente on Ezzelino I da Romano, and it remained in control of the Ezzelini family until their fall in 1260. It was then briefly under the control of Padua until 1262 when Treviso destroyed Mussolente's castle and took control of the town. In the early 14th century Mussolente's allegiance to the Scaligeri family made it a target of militias from other cities in the region who attacked and burnt down much of the town in 1320.

In 1339 Mussolente, along with the rest of the Trevisan territory, came under the dominion of the Republic of Venice. The town prospered under Venetian rule. The flatlands were cleared and returned to agricultural use with a village established in what is now the frazione Casoni di Mussolente. In the 1580s, several inhabitants of Mussolente were accused of Lutheran heresy and brought before the Inquisition in Belluno. Lorenzo Busnardo (1532–1598), described in the Inquisition documents as a "vagabond priest" from Mussolente, was accused of using chess games to lure people into seditious religious conversations. Busnardo (twice cleared of the charges) was one of the first Italian chess players to play at international level and to have his games published. With the fall of the Venetian Republic and the takeover of northern Italy by the Austrian Empire, Mussolente again went into a period of decline marked by poverty and significant emigration which continued through the first decades of the Kingdom of Italy.

Mussolente suffered considerable damage and loss of life during the two world wars of the 20th century, particularly during the First World War when it was the site of an important military airbase. The years following the end of the Second World War saw prosperity gradually return to the town, with further agricultural development, and the establishment of factories and small businesses. Today it is a comune in the Province of Vicenza with a population of 7,760 (as of 2011). Italy's post-2008 economic downturn has led to the closure of several factories in Mussolente between 2012 and 2013, including the 135-year-old textile factory, Coniugi Eger.

== Main sights ==
The town contains two villas of architectural interest: Villa Drigo and Villa Negri. Villa Drigo was originally known as Ca’ Soderini, named after the noble Florentine family for whom it was built. After decades of neglect, it was purchased in 1900 by Giulio Drigo, who restored both the building and its surrounding park, the latter considered among the finest in the Veneto region. The writer Paola Drigo Giulio’s wife lived in the villa for many years and managed the estate independently following her husband’s death in 1922. An account of her life in Mussolente is provided in her autobiographical novel, Fine d’anno, published in 1936.

Villa Negri was designed in 1763 by Antonio Gaidon (1738–1829) for Antonio Negri Miazzi, a nobleman from nearby Bassano del Grappa. Gaidon also worked on the design of the Chiesa della Madonna dell'Acqua (Church of the Madonna of the Water), which stands on a hill overlooking the town. The former parish church of Mussolente, it was constructed on the site of previous medieval churches and consecrated in 1802. The church was declared a sanctuary in 1964 and entrusted to the Priests of the Sacred Heart. A painting of the Madonna and Child by Andrea da Murano (floruit 1462–1502) hangs above its main altar. The church's bell tower is separate from the main building, and at its base stands a ruined chapel dedicated to Saint Nicholas.

== Twin towns ==
Mussolente is twinned with:

- Umag, Croatia
