= Peire Guilhem de Luserna =

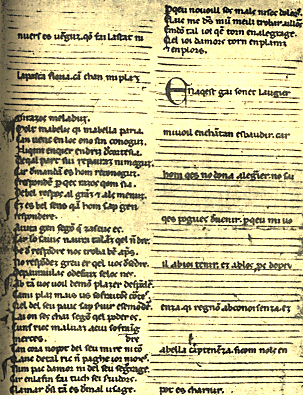
En aquest gai sonet leugier on the right in a page from troubadour manuscript G, where it is left unattributed and the staff lines intended for its music are disappointingly left unfilled.

Peire Guilhem de Luserna (Italian: Pietro Guglielmo di Luserna) was a Piedmontese troubadour.

Peire's identity as an Italian has been up for debate since the 19th century. "Luserna" more probably refers to Luserna in the Piedmont, rich and populous in Peire’s time, a town on the left bank of the Pellice lying on the road into the Viennois and Dauphiné, Occitan-speaking territories. On the other hand, it may be Lusarne (Luserna in Italian) in the Leberon valley in Provence, on the road between Reillane in the Basses-Alpes and Bastide-des-Jourdans.

Peire was probably at the court of the Este beginning in 1221, during the reign of Azzo VII, husband of Giovanna, the object of one of Peire's songs. Sometime before arriving at Ferrara, Peire was probably at the court of Manfred III of Saluzzo. In 1220 Aimeric de Peguilhan, then at the Malaspina court, mentioned him in a poem—Ni un autre tirador / qu’eu no vuoill dir de Luserna—as being among a quintet of Occitan poets at Saluzzo: Peire, Perceval Doria, Nicoletto da Torino, Chantarel, and Trufarel, all of whom Aimeric despised (and feared as a competition).

During the height of the conflict between the Emperor Frederick II and Milan, Peire wrote En aquest gai sonet leuger ("In this light, gay song"), dedicated to Giovanna:

Per q’eu me voill ab ioi tenir
Et ab los pros de Proenza
que regna nab conoissenza
et ab bella captenenza
si q’om no.ls en pot escarnir.
• • • • •
Na Ioana d’Est agenza
a toz los pros, ses faillenza,
per qu’eu.m voila b los pros tenir.

This song can be roughly dated. Frederick was at odds with Milan in 1225–7 and 1230–3, but shortly after 2 March 1226, when the Lombard League was renewed is most probable time.

Peire also wrote a defence of Cunizza da Romano in the form of a tenso with Uc de Saint Circ (Qi na Cuniça guerreia, "Who fights for Lady Cunizza"), a coblas esparsa which begins Be.s met en gran aventura ("Well is put to great risk"), a religious canso to the Virgin Mary (Ai, Vergena, en cui ai m'entendenza!, "Ah, Virgin, to whom my thought is turned!"), and a generic love song No.m fai chantar amors ni drudaria ("Neither love nor gallantry can make me sing").

== Sources ==
- Bertoni, Giulio. I Trovatori d'Italia: Biografie, testi, tradizioni, note. Rome: Società Multigrafica Editrice Somu, 1967 [1915].
- Riquer, Martín de. Los trovadores: historia literaria y textos. 3 vol. Barcelona: Planeta, 1975.
