= Henri de Gauchy =

French magister and canon

15th-century Parisian manuscript of Henri's translation

Henri de Gauchy (also spelled Gauchi, Latin: Henricus de Gauchiaco) was a French magister and canon of Saint-Martin de Liège in the late 13th century.

In 1282, at the request of King Philip IV of France, Henri translated the De regimine principum of Giles of Rome from Latin into French under the title Le livre du gouvernement des rois et des princes ('the book of the government of the kings and of the princes'). Giles's work was, with the Secretum Secretorum, the most popular work in the mirror for princes genre during the Middle Ages. Henri's translation is preserved complete in at least 30 manuscripts and in part in at least nine more.

Henri's translation, if not Giles's original, may have been the main source for the vernacular Venetian Trattato de regimine rectoris of Paolino Veneto.

== Editions ==
- Molenaer, Samuel Paul, ed. Li Livres du Gouvernement des Rois: A Thirteenth-century French Version of Egidio Colonna's Treatise De Regimine Principum. New York: The Macmillan Co., 1899.
  Reviewed by Paget Toynbee (1899), The English Historical Review 14(55): 548–550. JSTOR 548788
- Perret, Noëlle-Laetitia, ed. Les traductions françaises du De regimine principum de Gilles de Rome: Parcours matériel, culturel et intellectuel d'un discours sur l'éducation. Leiden: Brill, 2011.
  Reviewed by Daisy Delogu (2012), Mediaevistik 25: 551–553. JSTOR 42587612
