= Ezzelini =

Noble family in medieval Italy

The Ezzelini were a noble family in medieval Italy. Aristocrats, they were affiliated with the Ghibellines.

The family was founded by Ecelo (Ezzelo), who received the fiefs of Romano d'Ezzelino and Onara. They included:

- Ezzelino I da Romano (died 1189), called il Balbo
  - Ezzelino II da Romano (died 1235), called il Monaco, son of Ezzelino I
    - Ezzelino III da Romano (1194–1259), called il Tiranno, son of Ezzelino II
    - Alberico da Romano (1196–1260), son of Ezzelino II
    - Cunizza da Romano (born c. 1198), daughter of Ezzelino II.
