= Romano d'Ezzelino =

- Comune
- Comune di Romano d'Ezzelino
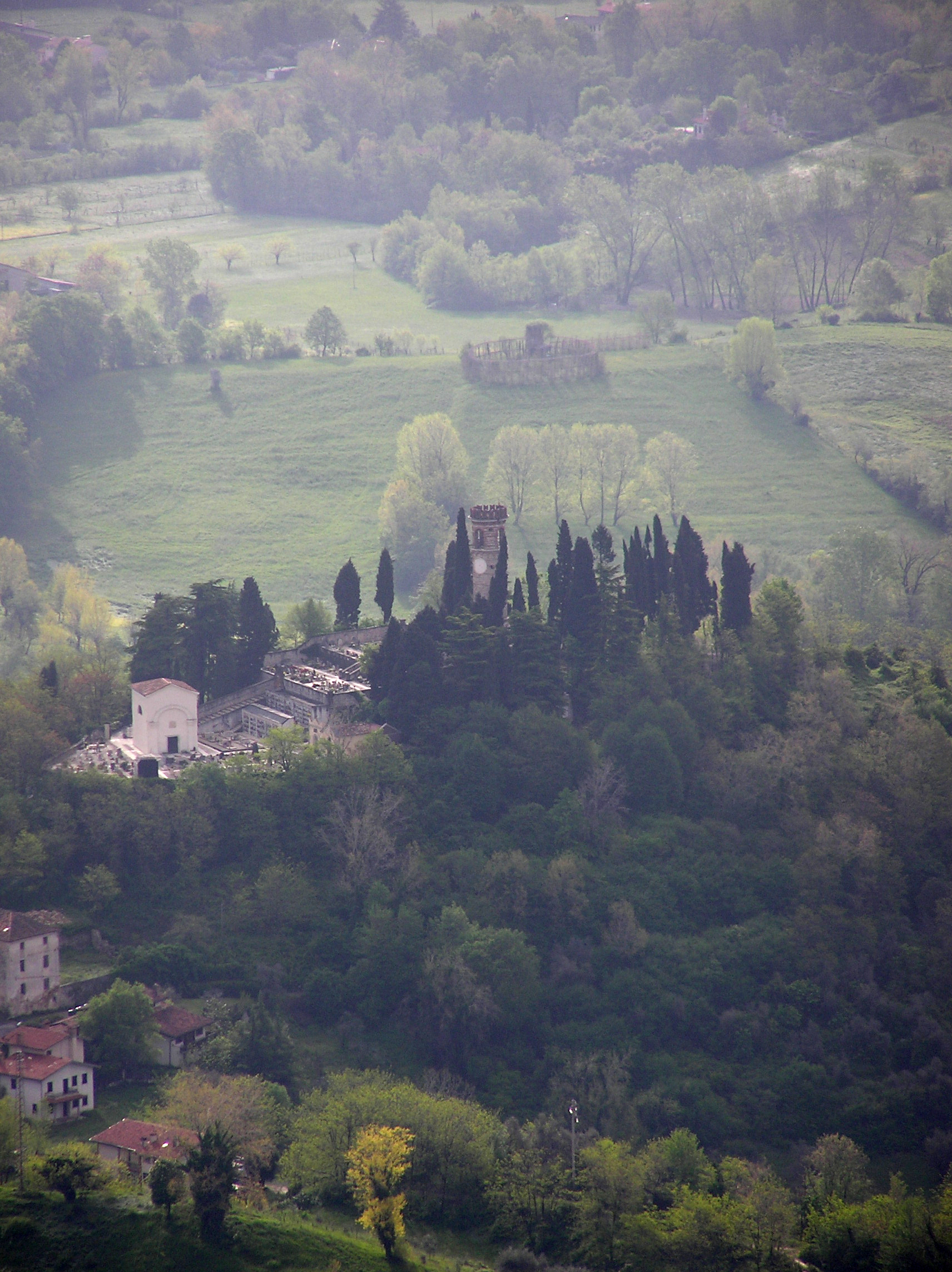
- View of Romano d'Ezzelino

- Coat of arms

- Location within Italy Location within Veneto
- Coordinates: 45°46′24″N 11°46′40″E
- Country: Italy
- Region: Veneto
- Province: Vicenza (VI)
- Frazioni: Romano d'Ezzelino, San Giacomo, Fellette, Sacro Cuore,

Government
  - Mayor: Simone Bontorin (Civic List (Italy))

Area
  - Total: 21 km^{2} (8.1 sq mi)
- Elevation: 132 m (433 ft)

Population (31 December 2012)
  - Total: 14,621
  - Density: 700/km^{2} (1,800/sq mi)
- Demonym: Romanesi ("romanotti" to distinguish those from the capital)
- Time zone: UTC+1 (CET)
  - Summer (DST): UTC+2 (CEST)
- Postal code: 36060
- Dialing code: 0424
- Patron saint: Santa Maria della Purificazione (communal seat)
- Saint day: 2 February (Romano capoluogo)
- Website: Official website

Romano d'Ezzelino is a small city with c. 14,000 residents in the Veneto region of northern Italy. It lies in the foothills of Monte Grappa and is located among some hills and country. The name "Romano" comes from Arimanno, a Lombard word meaning "military settlement". "Ezzelino" refers to the family of Ezzelini, who moved to Romano in 1199.

The coat of arms is inspired by Ezzelino III da Romano's emblem, which portrays a horseshoe carried by a swan. The meaning is justice and submission. The swan wears a crown, that represents the family greatness and a cross that refers to the crusades.

Romano d'Ezzelino was awarded the War Cross for Military Valor for the sacrifice made by the residents during World War II.

== Main sights ==
Valle Santa Felicita is situated in the northern side of Romano d'Ezzelino, the name is in honor of Santa Felicita, a holy figure who also gave her name to a monastery near Romano. There is also a big mansion house called Ca' Cornaro, which was built in the 16th century. Inside it there are frescos and decorations from the 18th century.

== Economy ==
Main companies active in the area include:

- Diesel
- Baxi
- Manfrotto
- SAMET
