= The Dante Encyclopedia =

2000 reference book by Richard Lansing

The Dante Encyclopedia, edited by Richard Lansing, is a reference book for the life and works of Dante, especially the Divine Comedy. Originally published in hardback in 2000, the book appeared in paperback in 2010.

== Reviews ==
The Dante Encyclopedia was published to positive reviews. Library Journal recommended the book highly, calling it "an indispensable reference work for most libraries, ... an excellent point of entry" for any student of Dante.
