= Alberico da Romano =

Italian condottiero, troubadour, and statesman (1196–1260)

Alberico da Romano (1196 – 26 August 1260), called Alberico II, was an Italian condottiero, troubadour, and an alternatingly Guelph and Ghibelline statesman. He was also a patron of Occitan literature.

== Biography ==
Alberico was born in the castle of San Zenone to Ezzelino II da Romano and Adelaide Alberti di Mangona. He was a brother of Ezzelino III and Cunizza. He married twice. From his first marriage to a noblewoman from Vicenza named Beatrice, he had one daughter, Adelaide, who married Rinaldo d'Este in 1235, and five sons: Ezzelino, killed in battle in 1243; Alberico; Romano; Ugolino; and Giovanni. From his second marriage to Margherita, he had three daughters: Griselda, Tornalisce, and Amabilia.

Politically allied with his brother Ezzelino, Alberico served as podestà of Vicenza on behalf of the Emperor Frederick II in 1227. In 1239, he became detached from the Ghibelline faction and allied with the Guelph Guecellone da Camino. That same year he aided the Milanese against the emperor. In 1240, as a Guelph, he conquered Treviso and became its podestà, governing it as a Ghibelline until 1257. Pope Alexander IV excommunicated him and, in 1259, on the death of his brother following the Battle of Cassano d'Adda, he was chased from the city of Treviso and took refuge in the castle of San Zenone with most of his family.

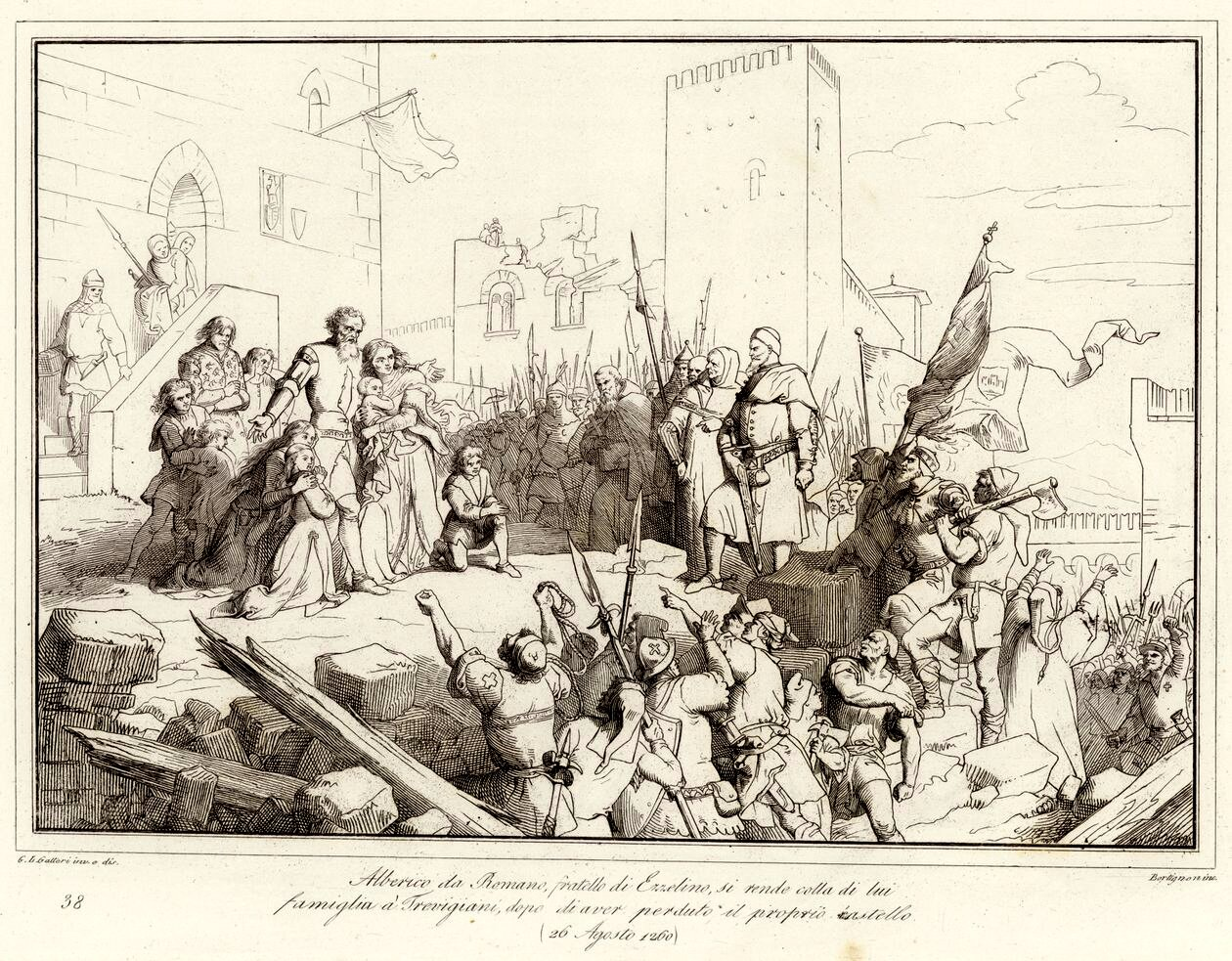
Surrender of Alberico to his enemies in 1260

On 25 August 1260 the Guelph troops of Venice, Trento, Padua, and Vicenza invested San Zenone. Completely encircled and with no possibility of mounting a defence, Alberico surrendered in the hopes of saving his and his relatives' lives. The hatred his brother had incurred, however, was too great. The following day his sons, some still young children, were chopped to pieces before his eyes while he languished in chains. His female relatives were paraded naked through the streets and then burned alive. Alberico, having been forced to assist in their execution, was then tortured with hot irons, tied to the tail of a horse, and dragged through the streets of Treviso until dead. The chronicler Salimbene de Adam recorded that "Vidi ista oculis meis" ("I saw this with my own eyes").

== Poetry ==
Alberico was a friend and patron of troubadours and an Occitan poet himself. He is known to have had contact with Sordello and Uc de Saint Circ. Folios 153r to 211r of the chansonnier known as MS D, now α, R.4.4 in the Biblioteca Estense, Modena, form the Liber Alberici ("Book of Alberic"). The Liber's rubric reads: Hec sunt inceptiones cantionum de libro qui fuit domini Alberici et nomini repertorum earundem cantionem. The chansonnier was produced in 1254 in Lombardy under Alberico's patronage.

Alberico has been identified as the author of the poem Na Maria, pretç e fina valors. The rubric identifies the composer as one nabieiris de roman (or nabietris...), which could be a corruption of N'Albric de Roman; however, the name is usually considered a corruption of "Beatriz", and the poem is assigned to Bieiris de Romans by most scholars today. Alberico does have one other work extant, a tenso he composed with Uc: Mesier Albric, so.m prega Ardisons.

Alberico also has a connection to the Sicilian School of poetry. The man he replaced at Treviso was the Sicilian poet Jacopo de Morra di Puglia.

== Sources ==
- Bertoni, Giulio. I Trovatori d'Italia: Biografie, testi, tradizioni, note. Rome: Società Multigrafica Editrice Somu, 1967 [1915].
