= Ezzelino III da Romano =

Italian feudal lord (1194–1259)

Ezzelino
- Podestà of Verona
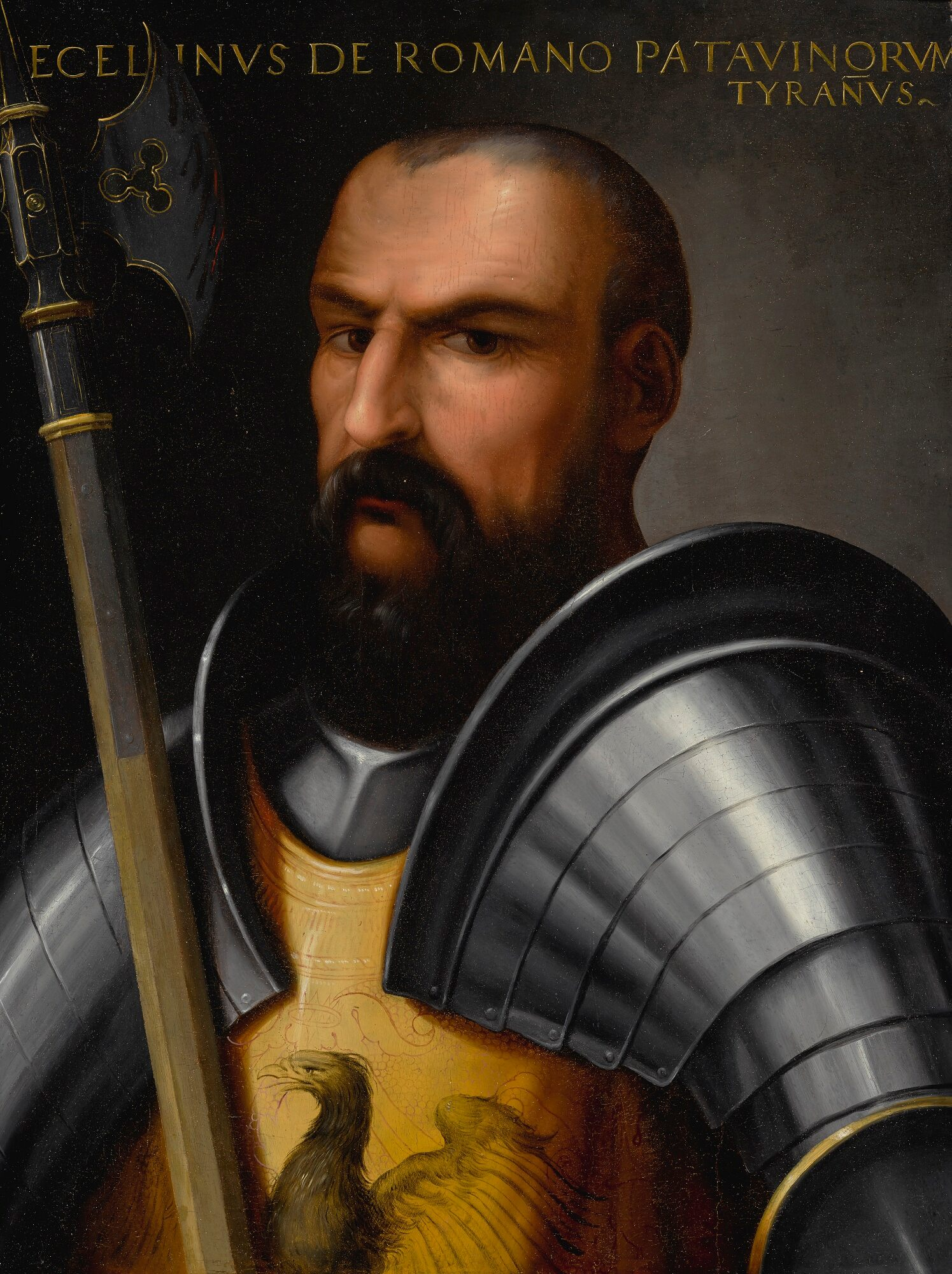
- Portrait of Ezzelino III da Romano by Cristofano dell'Altissimo.
- Reign: 1226–30, 1232–59
- Successor: Mastino I della Scala
- Other titles: Podestà of Padua (1236–59); Podestà of Vicenza (1237–56)
- Born: 25 April 1194; Tombolo
- Died: 7 October 1259 (aged 65); Castle of Soncino
- Family: Ezzelini
- Spouse: Selvaggia of Hohenstaufen (m. 1236; died 1244) Beatrice di Buontraverso (m. 1244)
- Father: Ezzelino II da Romano
- Occupation: statesman, commander

Ezzelino III da Romano (25 April 1194, Tombolo – 7 October 1259) was an Italian feudal lord, a member of the Ezzelini family, in the March of Treviso (in modern Veneto). He was a close ally of the emperor Frederick II (r. 1220–1250), and ruled Verona, Vicenza and Padua for almost two decades. He became infamous as a cruel tyrant and was, in fact, the most "notorious" of the "early tyrants".

== Biography ==
=== Early life ===
Ezzelino was the son of Ezzelino II da Romano, ruler of Bassano del Grappa and other fiefs in the Veneto, and Adelaide D'egli Alberti di Mangona, who came from a family of counts in Tuscany. At the age of four years, he was sent as a hostage to Verona, but nothing else is known about his childhood or education. In 1213, he took part in the siege of the castle of Este, which belonged to his father's archenemy, marquess Azzo VI of Este, who died in 1212 and was later succeeded by his son Aldobrandino. According to the chronicler Rolandino of Padua, the young Ezzelino already showed a keen interest in siegecraft and acquired a hatred of the Este which would last his entire life.

=== Rise to power 1226–1239 ===
When Ezzelino II retired to a monastery in 1223, his possessions went to his sons Alberico, who received the castles and villages in the countryside of Vicenza (including the important centre of Bassano del Grappa) and Ezzelino, who received the possessions in the countryside of Treviso. In 1226 Ezzelino intervened in a factional struggle in Verona, aiding the Monticuli and Quattuorviginti against their enemies, the so-called pars comitis ("party of the count"), which was headed by the Veronese count Richard of San Bonifacio. From this time onwards, Ezzelino became an important factor in Veronese politics and in 1226-1227 he became podestà or Lord Mayor of that city. He briefly lost Verona, but regained it in 1230.

At this time, control over Verona was important because Frederick II was in conflict with the Second Lombard League, an alliance of cities in Northern Italy. Whoever controlled Verona could block the Brenner Pass through the Alps, and thereby prevent the arrival of reinforcements for Frederick from Germany. Initially, Ezzelino favoured the Lombard League, which could block the Brenner and emerge victorious from its first confrontation with the Emperor. However, he and his brother Alberico later changed sides when it became apparent that the League favoured their enemies in the March, particularly the Este and the San Bonifacio (Sambonifacio).

In 1232 the brothers struck an alliance with Frederick and received an imperial privilege of protection. However, four years passed before the emperor could personally intervene in the March of Treviso. The years 1232–1236 were therefore very difficult for Ezzelino and Alberico, who were assailed by many enemies, primarily the San Bonifacio, the Este and the city of Padua.

In 1236, Frederick II finally arrived in the March of Treviso. Because Ezzelino and his Veronese allies, the Monticuli and Quattuorviginti, had gained control of Verona in early 1236, the emperor could bring reinforcements across the Alps, including 3000 German men-at-arms. In a campaign that began in November 1236, Frederick and Ezzelino, who was becoming an increasingly important ally of the emperor, subjugated all the important cities of the March of Treviso: Vicenza was conquered in November 1236, and Padua and Treviso surrendered in February/March 1237.

Activities of Ezzelino III da Romano.

In 1236, Ezzelino married Selvaggia, Frederick's natural daughter, who was thirteen years old at the time; he conquered Verona and, by treason, Padua, seizing the position of podestà of that city. In Padua he had the monk Giordano Forzatè arrested and exiled.

Ezzelino was one of the protagonists in the Ghibelline-Imperial victory of Cortenuova (1237) and in 1239 was named Imperial viceroy for the March of Treviso. His long-lasting struggle against Azzo VII of Este, the new duke of the Este, ended with the total defeat of the latter and the annexation of many territories.

=== Last years ===
After a failed pacification attempt by Frederick, as soon as the emperor departed, Ezzelino attacked the Este, submitting Treviso - even though it was his brother's fief - Belluno and Feltre. He was now lord of all lands between the city of Trento and the Oglio river and had acquired a reputation for cruelty and the regular use of torture against all enemies and alleged plotters in the cities he ruled. In 1249, five years after Selvaggia's death at the age of just 21 years, he married Beatrice di Buontraverso.

After Frederick's death in 1250, Ezzelino supported his son, Conrad IV. There was growing disgust at Ezzelino's cruel behaviour, and in 1254 he was excommunicated by Pope Innocent IV, who also launched a crusade against him. He had reconciled with his brother and allied himself with other seigneurs of the Veneto and Lombardy, attacking Padua, which resisted, and Brescia, which was instead sacked after an easy victory of his German knights over the crusaders' army. In 1258 he launched a broad Ghibelline offensive in Lombardy and Veneto along with Oberto Pallavicino of Cremona. After a failed attempt to assault Milan itself, he was wounded by an arrow in the course of the Battle of Cassano d'Adda and had to retreat, but was captured near Bergamo. He killed himself by intentional self-neglect during his imprisonment in the castle of Soncino, near the city of Cremona in Lombardy. In the following year his brother Alberico, as well as Alberico's wife and all of their children, were tortured and put to death, and the Romano family became extinct.

It was only after his death that the alliance between Sambonifacio and Este fell apart.

== Legacy ==
Much of what we know about Ezzelino comes from a literary tradition that was embroidered over the course of centuries; despite the brevity of his reign, Ezzelino's reputed cruelty became symbolic of tyranny. Poets and chroniclers living in recent memory of his tactics used his name to evoke the sense of arbitrary power and the moral transgressions it enabled; fourteenth-century authors raised the level of accusation, insisting that Ezzelino's parentage was demonic. Rolandino of Padua's Chronicle of the Trevisan March (c. 1262) charts the rise and the fall of the 'da Romano' family, introducing Ezzelino as a young man throwing stones at the home of the family rival; the extremely partisan political work follows the fortunes of Padua under the tyrant's iron grip up to the commune's liberation by the Guelph League. Albertino Mussato's Ecerinis ( c. 1315 ) portrays Ezzelino as the son of the Devil; the Latin verse play introduces Ezzelino's mother, who provides testimony of the tyrant's infernal sire. In Dante Alighieri's Divine Comedy, his soul is consigned to Hell, where Dante encounters him in the Seventh Circle, First Ring: the Violent against their Neighbours (Inferno, XII, 109). His younger sister Cunizza is also cited by Dante in Paradise, IX, 31-33.

Before Ezzelino, the seizing of political power in city-states throughout the Middle Ages had been based on real or pretended inheritance claims or else was directed against infidels and the excommunicated; but with him, as the historian Jacob Burkhardt relates, "Here for the first time the attempt was openly made to found a throne by wholesale murder and endless barbarities, by the adoption in short, of any means with a view to nothing but the end pursued." The example set by the success of this kind of ruthlessness was not lost on the future tyrants of the late Middle Ages and early Renaissance Italy.

== See also ==
- Ezzelini
- Frederick II, Holy Roman Emperor
- Guelphs and Ghibellines

== Sources ==
- Dean, Trevor (1999). "The rise of the signori". In Abulafia, David (ed.). The New Cambridge Medieval History (Vol. 5): c. 1198-c. 1300. Cambridge University Press. ISBN 978-0521362894.
