= March of Treviso =

Medieval territory in Venetia

The March of Treviso (Latin: Marca trevisana, Italian: Marca trevigiana or trivigiana) was a medieval territory in Venetia, between the Garda and the Julian March. The territory corresponded roughly to the region around the city of Treviso, including Belluno, Feltre, and Ceneda and the dioceses of all four cities. It bordered the March of Verona and the Muson. For this reason, the motto Monti Musoni Ponto dominorque Naoni was used for the march as early as 1162. Over time the march of Verona (Verona, Vicenza, and Padua) became merged with that of Treviso and the Trevisan denomination preferred. In the High Middle Ages the region was under the domination of the Guelph Caminesi and the Ghibelline Ezzelini families. In time the march came under the control of the Republic of Venice.

Rolandino of Padua wrote a Chronicle of the Trevisan March around 1262, recounting the history of the Ezzelini and their dominance there. In the Veneto today marca or marca gioiosa et amorosa is a reference to the Province of Treviso.

== See also ==
- Cassa di Risparmio della Marca Trivigiana
