= Siege of Faenza =

1240–1241 conflict

Coordinates: 44°17′24″N 11°15′37″E

- Part of the Wars of the Guelphs and Ghibellines
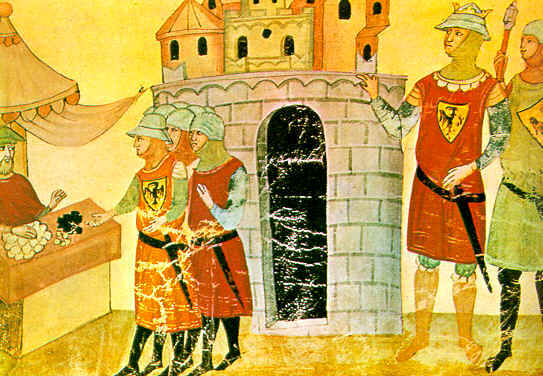
- Frederick II paying his troops with leather coins during the siege of Faenza from the Nuova Cronica (c. 1348).
Date	August 1240 – April 14, 1241
Location	Faenza, Romagna, present-day Italy
Result	Imperial victory

Belligerents
Holy Roman Empire; Kingdom of Sicily; Ghibellines	Faenzan Guelphs; Bolognese Guelphs; Republic of Venice; Tuscan Guelphs

Commanders and leaders
Frederick II	Michele Morosini; Guido Guerra

Strength
8,000–10,000 men: 2,000–3,000 German cavalry; 2,000–3,000 troops from the Kingdom of Sicily; 2,000 Romagnol communal troops; 1,000–2,000 reinforcements from Lodi, Vercelli and Novara	3,000–4,000: 1,500–2,500 Faenzan militia; 1,000 Bolognese and Venetian infantry; 500-1,000 Tuscan retainers

Casualties and losses
300–600 killed and wounded	500–1,000 killed and wounded ~70 prisoners executed 100–300 Guelph leaders exiled or imprisoned

The siege of Faenza was fought from late August 1240 until 14 April 1241 between the forces of Holy Roman Emperor Frederick II and the Guelph-controlled city of Faenza during the wars of the Guelphs and Ghibellines. One of the longest operations of Frederick's Italian campaigns, the siege ended in an Imperial victory after nearly eight months of blockade, bombardment and economic attrition.

Faenza occupied an important position in Romagna on the communications linking northern Italy with the central peninsula and the approaches to the Papal States. It was closely allied with Bologna, one of the principal centres of papal resistance in the region, and Frederick regarded possession of Faenza as necessary to secure his rear before attempting a further advance against Bologna. The siege consequently formed part of the wider struggle between Frederick and Pope Gregory IX for control of imperial Italy after the emperor's second excommunication in 1239.

The operation also demonstrated Frederick's ability to modify his methods after previous experience. An initial assault failed against a reinforced and determined defence. Rather than repeatedly expend troops against the fortifications, as during the unsuccessful siege of Brescia two years earlier, Frederick converted the operation into a systematic blockade, surrounded Faenza with an extensive fortified siege line and prepared his army to remain through the winter. Severe financial pressure eventually forced the emperor to pay troops with leather tokens redeemable for coin, but the army maintained the investment until declining food stocks and the approaching agricultural season forced the city to negotiate. The capture of Faenza strengthened Imperial control of Romagna and became the first in a rapid sequence of successes in 1241 that culminated weeks later in the destruction of the papal-Genoese convoy at the Battle of Giglio.

== Background ==
In August 1237 Frederick returned to northern Italy after having restored his authority in Germany, defeated the rebellion of his son Henry (VII), reconciled with the Welfs and secured the election of his son Conrad as king of the Romans. His immediate objective was the restoration of effective imperial authority over the northern Italian communes and the destruction or submission of the renewed Lombard League. The campaign initially produced spectacular results. Mantua submitted and on 27 November Frederick destroyed the principal League field army at the Battle of Cortenuova, capturing the Milanese Carroccio and thousands of prisoners. Milan, however, refused Frederick's demand for unconditional submission. The emperor's subsequent siege of Brescia in 1238 failed after a prolonged investment, demonstrating the enormous defensive strength and resources that the larger Italian communes could mobilize.

The struggle thereafter broadened considerably. Gregory IX increasingly regarded the survival of the anti-imperial communes as indispensable to the security of the Papal States, while Frederick considered papal involvement a direct obstruction of his jurisdiction within the Kingdom of Italy. By 1239 the Lombard conflict had merged with a renewed confrontation between the two universal powers of Latin Christendom, turning northern and central Italy into an interconnected theatre extending from Lombardy and the Veneto through Romagna, Tuscany and the papal territories.

== War for Lombardy and Italy ==
The military balance remained fluid after Brescia. Frederick retained formidable forces and powerful communal allies, but the anti-imperial coalition survived and expanded. The papacy, Genoa and Venice became increasingly involved, while Bologna emerged as one of the strongest centres of opposition south of the Po. Ferrara, Ravenna and the cities of Romagna therefore acquired particular importance as the struggle spread toward the routes connecting Lombardy with central Italy. In 1239 and early 1240 operations ranged across much of the peninsula. Frederick moved through Tuscany and the Papal States, while his lieutenants maintained pressure upon the Lombard communes. The emperor captured or secured Lucca, Siena, Arezzo and Foligno, while several communities acknowledged Imperial authority. The contest simultaneously spread to the maritime sphere as Genoa and Venice aligned increasingly closely with Gregory IX.

The situation in the northeast deteriorated for the Imperial party during the first half of 1240. Ferrara, after a prolonged siege, fell to a coalition including Venetians, Bolognese, Milanese and forces associated with the papal legate Gregorio da Montelongo. The loss threatened to unravel Frederick's position throughout Romagna. Frederick therefore marched north through the March of Ancona and rapidly recovered Ravenna in August after only a few days of pressure. His larger objective was Bologna. Before attempting that considerably more difficult target, however, Frederick moved against Bologna's ally Faenza. The city threatened his rear and communications and could serve as a base for attacks upon an Imperial army advancing farther west. Its reduction was conceived as a preliminary operation within a broader campaign for the political and military control of Romagna.

== Struggle between Frederick II and Pope Gregory IX ==
The Italian war had meanwhile become inseparable from Frederick's conflict with Gregory IX. In March 1239 the pope again excommunicated the emperor, accusing him of offences against the Church and supporting resistance to Imperial power in Italy. Gregory allied increasingly closely with Frederick's Italian opponents, while papal diplomacy sought support among the princes and bishops of Germany and the monarchies of western Europe. Frederick answered through military pressure, diplomatic appeals to other rulers and an extensive propaganda campaign portraying Gregory's alliance with the Lombards as an assault upon legitimate secular authority.

By 1240 neither side could treat the conflict as a conventional regional war. The question of the Lombard communes had become entangled with the competing claims of emperor and papacy to leadership within Latin Christendom. Attempts at reconciliation during the spring and summer of 1240 ultimately failed principally over the Lombard question. Gregory refused to abandon his allies, while Frederick expected a settlement with the papacy to clear the way for the restoration of Imperial authority in northern Italy. The fall of Ferrara made Frederick's position in Romagna particularly urgent. Rather than march directly into the comparatively exposed Papal Patrimony, he returned north and restored Ravenna before attacking Faenza. Thus the siege developed within two overlapping wars: the struggle against the communal Guelph coalition and the rapidly intensifying contest with Gregory IX himself.

=== The siege of Faenza ===
Frederick began operations against Faenza at the end of August 1240. The city was smaller than the great Lombard communes, probably containing fewer than 10,000 inhabitants, and lacked the rivers, marshes or other major natural defences that had complicated earlier Imperial operations. Its garrison, however, had been substantially reinforced. More than 1,000 Bolognese and Venetian infantry were present within the walls together with the Tuscan noble Guido Guerra and his retainers, while the defence was directed by the Venetian podestà Michele Morosini.

Frederick initially attempted to take the city rapidly. Imperial troops devastated the suburbs and surrounding countryside and launched an assault upon the defences, but the attackers were repulsed. A reported attempt to intimidate the defenders by executing around seventy prisoners before the walls likewise failed. Frederick initially expected the resistance to collapse quickly; by late September, however, it had become apparent that Faenza would require a prolonged investment.

The emperor then adopted a fundamentally different operational method. Drawing upon the experience of Brescia, he avoided exhausting his army in repeated frontal attacks and instead imposed a complete blockade designed to force the city into submission through attrition and hunger. Reinforcements were summoned from Lodi, Vercelli and Novara to supplement the German cavalry, troops from the Kingdom of Sicily and contingents supplied by Imperial communes in Romagna. Around Faenza the besiegers constructed an elaborate circumvallation of ditches, palisades, fortified camps and wooden towers. Siege engines, probably including mangonels and trebuchets, maintained pressure upon the walls and defenders. Permanent huts and other accommodation were erected as Frederick committed the army to remaining throughout the winter.

Venice attempted to break the pressure indirectly. A Venetian squadron raided the Adriatic coast of the Kingdom of Sicily, sacking Termoli and attacking shipping off Apulia in an effort to force Frederick to divert resources southward. The emperor refused to abandon the siege and instead organized local coastal defence within the kingdom. Maintaining the investment nevertheless imposed severe financial burdens. The army had to be fed and paid through months of inactivity, and a new general levy was demanded from the Kingdom of Sicily to sustain military expenditure. When the Imperial treasury ran short of specie, leather tokens bearing Imperial authority were issued as temporary payment and promised redemption in regular currency. The arrangement succeeded because Frederick's soldiers accepted the emperor's guarantee that the tokens would later be honoured.

The blockade finally became decisive with the approach of spring. Faenza's stores were dwindling and continued resistance threatened to prevent cultivation and harvesting outside the walls, creating the prospect of a still deeper food crisis. An attempt to evacuate women and children in order to conserve provisions was rejected by the besiegers, while the expected relief army from Bologna or Milan never appeared. On 14 April 1241 the city capitulated after nearly eight months.

== Aftermath ==
Faenza surrendered on negotiated terms. Its inhabitants received extensive guarantees for their lives and property, while allied soldiers inside the city were permitted to return home. In return the commune abandoned the papal coalition and entered the Imperial camp. Frederick imposed close political supervision: Imperial supporters were installed in positions of authority, leading members of the papal faction were exiled or deported to Apulia, and a fortified complex containing a residence for the ruler or his officials was established inside the city. His treatment of the defeated inhabitants was nevertheless conspicuously mild after their prolonged resistance.

The result represented Frederick's first substantial military success in Italy since Cortenuova. It had been costly and laborious rather than spectacular: seven months of blockade had strained the Imperial treasury and exhausted the besieging army almost as severely as the defenders. Its strategic importance was greater than the manner of its capture suggested. Faenza had been an important ally of Bologna and an obstacle to secure Imperial communications through Romagna; its submission, combined with the earlier recovery of Ravenna, substantially strengthened Frederick's position along the routes joining northern and central Italy.

The campaign also showed a marked development in Frederick's siegecraft. After the costly failure before Brescia, he demonstrated considerable operational adaptability by abandoning repeated assaults once Faenza proved unexpectedly resilient and converting the siege into a methodical war of blockade, fortification, bombardment and economic exhaustion. His determination to maintain the army through winter, despite Venetian diversionary attacks and serious financial strain, ultimately made the strategy effective.

Frederick's chancery celebrated the capitulation far more dramatically. Messengers carried announcements by land and sea, while imperial correspondence transformed the protracted blockade into a heroic conquest and represented the preservation of Faenza as an expression of princely clemency. Frederick presented the fall of the city as the opening of a new sequence of victories that would culminate in the reduction of Bologna and the destruction of the papal party in northeastern Italy. News of the success travelled as far as England and Germany.

Events almost immediately gave that triumph wider significance. Within weeks the combined Imperial and Pisan fleet destroyed the Genoese convoy carrying senior prelates to Gregory's projected council at the Battle of Giglio, preventing most of its western delegates from reaching Rome. Faenza therefore belongs to the remarkable succession of imperial successes during the spring of 1241. Taken together with the fall of Ravenna and Benevento to imperial forces, and the decisive victory at Giglio, the successful siege helped open Frederick's communications through much of Italy and enabled him to exert intense military pressure upon Gregory IX in the final months of the pope's life.

== Sources ==
- Abulafia, David (1988). Frederick II: A Medieval Emperor. London: Allen Lane. ISBN 978-0-7139-9004-1.
- Grillo, Paolo (2023). Federico II: La guerra, le città e l'Impero. Milan: Mondadori. ISBN 978-88-04-76912-5.
- Stürner, Wolfgang (2000). Friedrich II. Teil 2: Der Kaiser 1220–1250. Darmstadt: Primus Verlag. ISBN 978-3-534-12229-5.
