= Gualdrada Berti =

Italian noblewoman (1168–1226)

Gualdrada Berti dei Ravignani (Florence, c. 1168 - Poppi, 1226) was a member of the Ghibelline nobility of twelfth-century Florence, Italy. A descendant of the Ravignani family and daughter of the powerful Bellincione Berti, Gualdrada later married into the Conti Guido family. Her character as a pure and virtuous Florentine woman is called upon by many late medieval Italian authors, including Dante Alighieri, Giovanni Boccaccio, and Giovanni Villani.

== Biography ==
Gualdrada was born around 1168 in Florence, Italy. Her father, Bellincion Berti, was the powerful Ghibelline head of the Ravingnani family. Around 1180, Gualdrada became the second wife of Count Guido Guerra III "il Vecchio," an important general of the Guelph party (the rival political party to her father's). This marriage was politically advantageous for Florence, as it stopped the ongoing hostile relationship between the Conti Guido family and the city. Gualdrada continued to work as a mediator between the Conti Guido and Florence, with records showing her acting as a head of her family to free a monastery owned by the Guidi from an armed Florentine threat. The four of her sons that lived into adulthood established the four branches in which the Conti Guido family split. Gualdrada lived longer than her husband and died in 1226 in the Poppi Castle, a medieval castle in Poppi, Tuscany, which was owned by one of her sons.

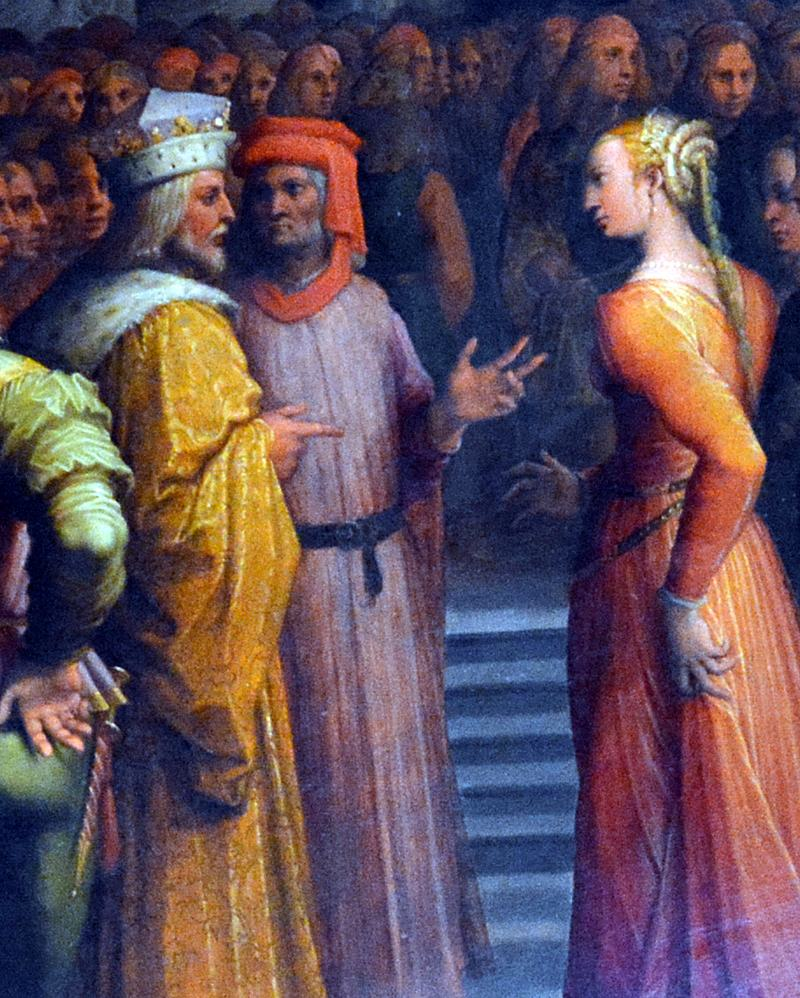
Gualdrada refuses to kiss emperor Otto IV (Detail of a painting in Palazzo Vecchio in Florence)

== A Symbol of Virtue ==
Gualdrada's status as a famous Florentine woman and symbol of virtue was cemented by an episode first recounted in Nuova Cronica by mid-fourteenth-century Florentine historian Giovanni Villani. The historical reliability of this story, however, has been contested by scholars, as it is said to take place in 1209, a time when there is evidence of Gualdrada's sons already being adults. Despite these inconsistencies, Gualdrada's legacy as a symbol of virtue is heavily entwined with this story reported by Villani.

In this role, Gualdrada is one of four women of her time to be written about in Giovanni Boccaccio's De mulieribus claris (On Famous Women), a collection of biographies of notable women ranging from the Bible and classical antiquity to Boccaccio's contemporaries. In his biography of Gualdrada, Boccaccio calls upon Villani's episode: during a festival in a Florentine cathedral, the Holy Roman Emperor Otto IV spotted Gualdrada from his seat and was impressed with her beauty. He admired her youthful innocence, the way she dressed, and her personality. He asked who she was to the man beside him, describing her as having a "beautiful face that ... surpasses all the others in dignity." The emperor did not know that the man he was asking coincidentally was Gualdrada's father, Bellincione Berti. He responded to the emperor stating that if he wished, he could get Gualdrada to kiss him. Gualdrada overheard this exchange and bravely objected, stating that "no living man would ever kiss her except her husband," solidifying her character as one of womanly virtue and purity. The emperor was both stunned and impressed by Gualdrada's response. Learning that he was speaking to her father, he praised her in an eloquent speech addressed to everyone present and celebrated her virtue. As he was leaving the festival, he summoned one of his barons, called Guido, and promoted him to a count. He then presented to Gualdrada a large dowry consisting of Casentino and a part of the territory of Romagna. Gualdrada was then given to Guido in marriage.

Although this specific event most likely did not happen, Gualdrada was still married to Count Guido and was still a Florentine figure worthy of admiration for her mediation between the Conti Guido family and Florence.

In the sixteenth century, a room in Palazzo Vecchio of Florence was dedicated to Gualdrada as a personification of virtue. The so-called Room of Gualdrada (Sala di Gualdrada) was located in the quarters of Eleanor of Toledo, wife of Cosimo I de' Medici, and it features a painted ceiling of the episode recounted by Villani and Boccaccio painted by the Flemish artist Stradanus, also known as Giovanni Stradano, surrounded by detailed scenes of sixteenth-century Florence and allegories of virtue.

== In Dante's Divine Comedy ==
Dante mentions Gualdrada in his Divine Comedy. Her name appears in Canto XVI, line 37 of Inferno, when Dante meets the Florentine man, Guido Guerra V, in the ring of the Seventh Circle of Hell reserved for the sodomites. Dante describes Guerra as the "grandson of the good Gualdrada," giving him the honor of coming from an admirable family and using Gualdrada's image of a virtuous and good woman to do so.

Dante himself was not only a Florentine, but a (White) Guelph, so the marriage between Gualdrada, a member of a notable Ghibelline clan, to Guido Guerra III, a Guelph leader, which ended hostilities between the two factions in the city of Florence, is an event that would be important to him. This is especially likely since Dante started writing Inferno soon after he had been exiled from Florence for his political alignment as a White Guelph.

Dante's respect for Gualdrada extends beyond her to her family as well. Her father, Bellincion Berti, is mentioned in Canto XV, lines 112-113 and Canto XVI, line 99 of Paradiso XV as a model citizen and a symbol of the virtue of old Florence.
