= Guido Guerra =

Guido Guerra may refer to:

- Guido Guerra I (d. 1103)
- Guido Guerra II (d. 1124)
- Guido Guerra III (d. 1213)
- Guido Guerra IV (1196–1239)
- Guido Guerra of Dovadola (1220–1272)
- Guido Guerra (engineer) (1920-2011)
