= Battle of Giglio =

Sea battle in 1241

- Part of Guelphs and Ghibellines and Genoese-Pisan Wars
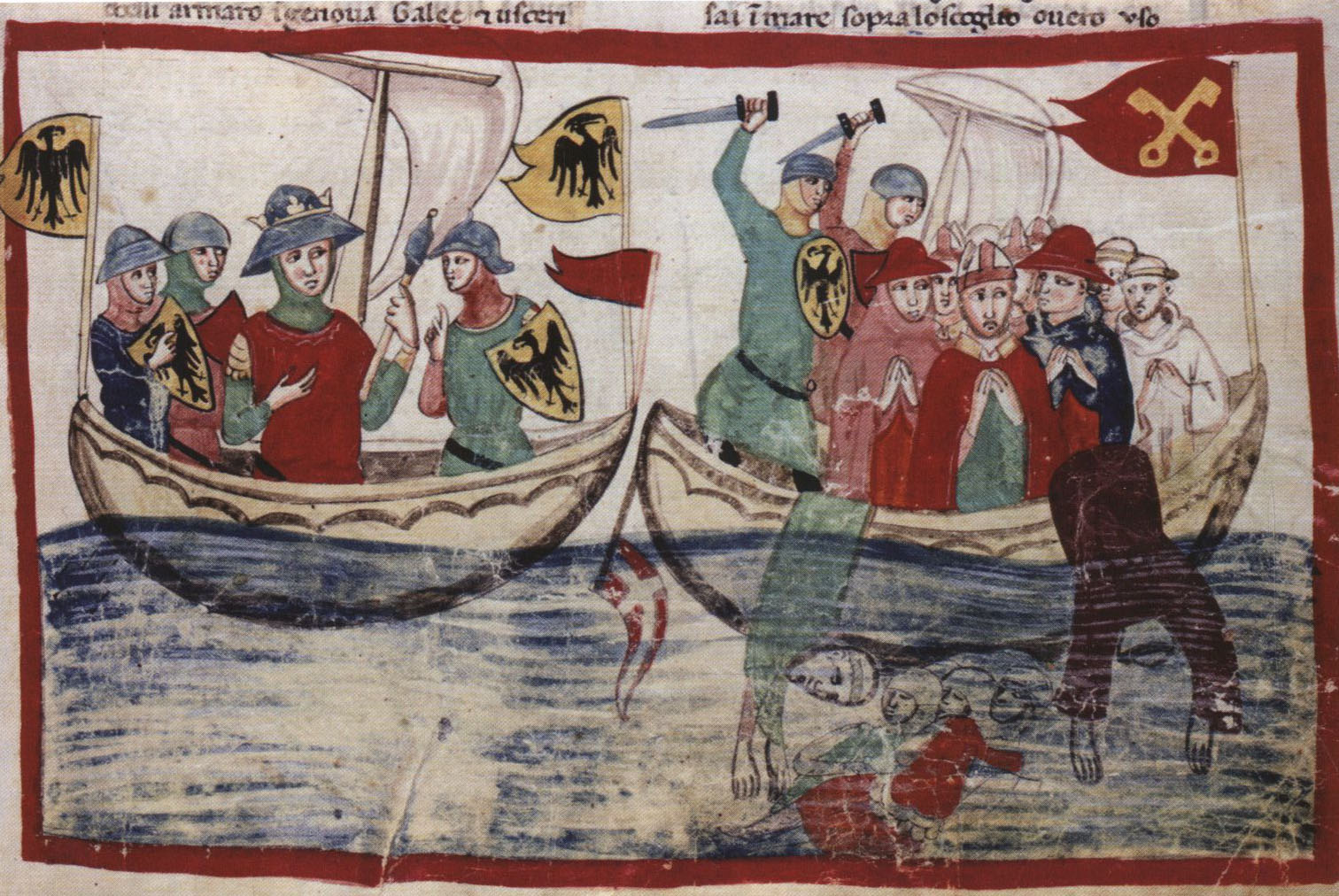
- Miniature depicting the battle of Giglio; Nuova Cronica Vatican Library Chig.L.VIII.296
Date	3 May 1241
Location	Isle of Giglio, Tyrrhenian Sea 42°20′30″N 10°35′00″E
Result	Imperial-Pisan victory

Belligerents
Holy Roman Empire; Kingdom of Sicily; Republic of Pisa; Ghibellines	Papacy; Republic of Genoa

Commanders and leaders
Enzo of Sardinia; Ansaldo de Mari; Ugolino Buzaccherini	Giacobo Malocello; Gregorio da Montelongo

Strength
67 galleys and lighter warships: 40 Pisan galleys; 27 Sicilian/imperial galleys; Savonese light vessels	27 vessels: mostly Genoese galleys; several tarides

Casualties and losses
Negligible	2,000 killed 4,000 captured 1 archbishop killed and 18 prelates captured 3 galleys sunk 22 galleys captured

The naval Battle of Giglio, also known as the Battle of Montecristo, was fought on 3 May 1241 between a combined Imperial, Sicilian and Pisan fleet and a Genoese squadron carrying high-ranking ecclesiastical delegates to a council summoned at Rome by Pope Gregory IX. The engagement took place in the Tyrrhenian Sea between Montecristo and Giglio and ended in a decisive victory for the forces of Emperor Frederick II.

The battle formed one of the most dramatic episodes of the second war between Frederick and Gregory IX. The papal council had become potentially decisive in a conflict that had expanded far beyond the original dispute over the Lombard League: Gregory sought the collective support of the western Church and the European monarchies against the excommunicated emperor, while Frederick regarded the proposed assembly as a partisan tribunal capable of supplying ecclesiastical and political legitimacy for his deposition. The emperor could readily prevent the clergy of the Kingdom of Sicily and much of the German episcopate from attending the projected council, allowing him to concentrate his efforts on stopping the French, English and Spanish prelates whose arrival would give the assembly its wider European weight. Frederick sought to prevent the western prelates from reaching Rome. His response displayed the breadth of his strategic grasp, combining diplomatic pressure, intelligence, threats against the land routes, attacks around Genoa, exploitation of the traditional Pisan-Genoese rivalry and the concentration of the Sicilian and Pisan fleets across the maritime approaches to Rome.

The destruction of the Genoese convoy prevented most of the expected delegates from reaching Gregory, resulted in the capture of cardinals, archbishops, bishops, abbots and diplomatic representatives from across western Europe, and effectively wrecked the projected council. Giglio consequently possessed a political importance unusual even for a major medieval naval victory: the immediate prize was a fleet, but the strategic prize was the interruption of an international ecclesiastical assembly at a critical moment in the struggle between the two universal powers of Latin Christendom.

== Prelude ==
Following Frederick's great victory at the Battle of Cortenuova in 1237, relations between emperor and pope deteriorated rapidly. Gregory IX increasingly identified the survival of the Lombard communes with the political security of the Papal States, while Frederick regarded papal support for the League as interference with the legitimate exercise of imperial jurisdiction in northern Italy. The conflict culminated in Frederick's second excommunication on 20 March 1239. By 1240–1241 the struggle had become a general contest for power across northern and central Italy. Frederick's forces had secured a succession of gains, including the submission of several communes and the eventual fall of Faenza after a successful siege, while the emperor's armies increasingly threatened the communications joining Rome with the papal party in northern Italy.

On 9 August 1240 Gregory summoned leading archbishops, bishops and abbots of the Latin Church, together with representatives of the principal European rulers, to assemble at Rome by Easter 1241. Although the summons was couched in comparatively general language, the political implications were unmistakable. Papal diplomacy had already attempted to encourage opposition to Frederick in Germany, and a large assembly of western churchmen could provide Gregory with an immensely more authoritative platform from which to condemn the emperor. The projected gathering consequently threatened to transform an Italian war into a judgment rendered before representatives of western Christendom. French participation was particularly significant because Louis IX of France had maintained a careful neutrality between the two universal powers; a collective declaration by leading French prelates against Frederick had the potential to disturb that balance.

Frederick responded by attempting to prevent the assembly from reaching the necessary concentration of delegates. He initially offered protection to ecclesiastics willing to travel through territories under imperial control, while simultaneously warning that he regarded Gregory's proposed gathering as a partisan council of his enemies. He subsequently ordered his officials to intercept persons travelling toward Rome by land or sea. The imperial counterstroke was both logical and skillful: Frederick identified the projected council as a political weapon directed against imperial authority and responded by attempting to deny it the breadth and legitimacy that the attendance of western prelates would provide. The western delegates therefore had to adopt a maritime route: French, English and Spanish churchmen would travel to the Mediterranean coast, embark on Genoese vessels and sail to Civitavecchia or Ostia.

The struggle for the council now became a contest over communications. Gregory's representative Gregorio de Romania negotiated an elaborate and expensive transport agreement with Genoa, while Frederick began concentrating naval forces at Pisa during the closing months of 1240. Enzio was sent to coordinate imperial forces there. In March 1241 Pisa formally warned Genoa that the combined Pisan and royal fleets would prevent the convoy from reaching Rome; Genoa refused and reaffirmed its support for the papal cause.

The ecclesiastical convoy gathered first at Nice and then reached Genoa on 7 April. There it was joined by northern Italian prelates and ambassadors of Milan, Piacenza and Brescia. Meanwhile the pressure around Genoa intensified. Imperial lieutenants Marino da Eboli and Oberto Pallavicino moved against Genoese territory from different directions, supporters of Frederick inside Genoa attempted to destabilize the government, and a Sicilian squadron sailed north to join the Pisans. By late April the royal fleet numbered twenty-seven galleys and had joined roughly forty Pisan warships, while the Genoese could field only twenty-seven vessels for the voyage south.

== Battle ==
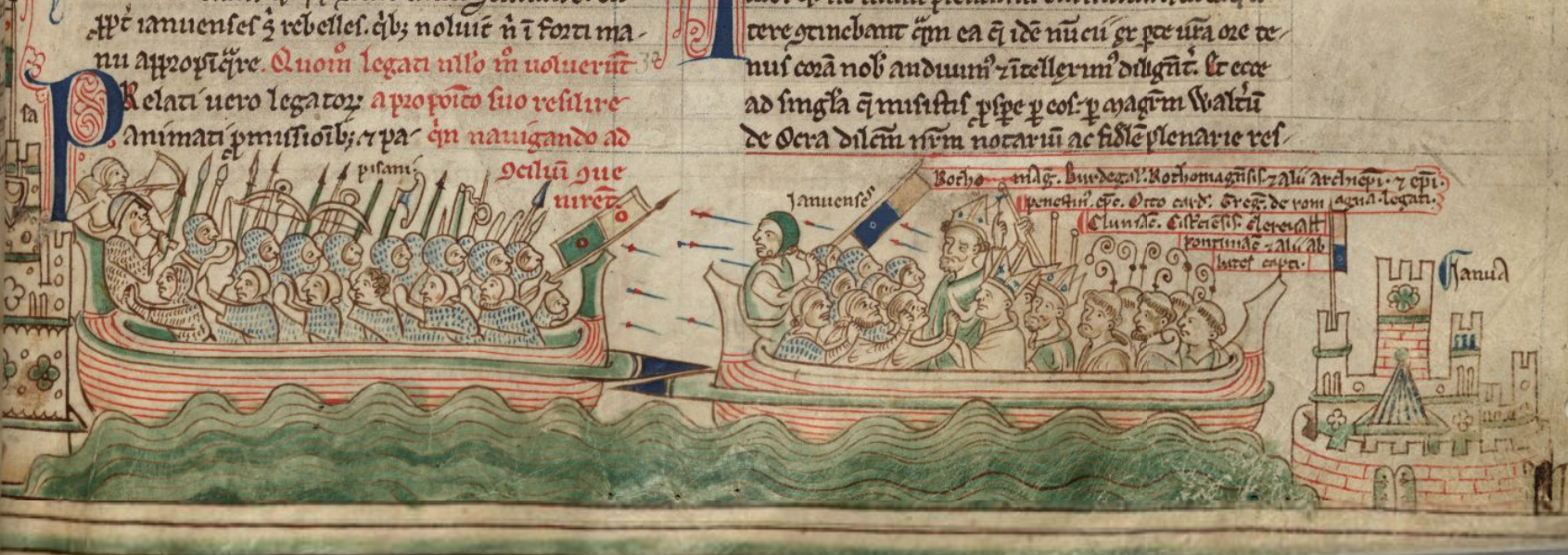
Depiction of the battle of Giglio in the Chronica Majora of Matthew Paris (1259)

The Genoese convoy finally left for Rome at the end of April. Its commander, Giacomo Malocello, and the papal representative Gregorio de Romania faced an unenviable choice. Remaining in Genoa exposed the delegates to the growing military pressure around the city; sailing south meant attempting to penetrate a maritime interception zone dominated by a substantially larger imperial-Pisan fleet. After stops along the Ligurian coast, the convoy continued into the Tyrrhenian Sea. The older account of the voyage records halts at Portofino and Porto Venere.

The imperial and Pisan commanders had positioned their forces off the Tuscan coast between Giglio and Montecristo, supplemented by lighter vessels from Savona. On 3 May the Genoese ships appeared and were attacked by the waiting fleet. The numerical disparity was overwhelming. Against twenty-seven Genoese vessels stood a combined force of roughly sixty-seven Pisan and Sicilian galleys and lighter warships. The Genoese ships were additionally burdened with a large body of clerical passengers, attendants, diplomatic representatives, baggage and money intended for the papal cause.

The battle was consequently brief and exceptionally destructive. The Genoese attempted resistance, and their own version subsequently claimed the destruction of three Pisan vessels, but the combined imperial fleet rapidly overwhelmed the convoy. Only a handful of Genoese galleys escaped, carrying Malocello, the archbishops of Arles and Tarragona, the Spanish delegation and several other survivors. Twenty-two Genoese vessels were sunk or captured, sixteen falling to the royal fleet and six to the Pisans in the imperial account. The Archbishop of Besançon was among those killed or drowned.

The scale of the human losses was enormous for a medieval naval battle. Contemporary traditions place the dead at approximately 2,000 and the number of prisoners in the thousands. More than 2,000 prisoners can be securely placed in imperial and Pisan hands, while Frederick's own announcement claimed about 4,000. The prisoners included members of the Genoese elite together with an extraordinary concentration of senior churchmen and diplomats. Among those captured were the cardinal-bishop Giacomo da Pecorara of Palestrina and Otto da Tonengo, cardinal of San Nicola in Carcere; Gregorio de Romania; the archbishops of Rouen, Bordeaux and Auch; the bishops of Carcassonne, Agde and Nîmes; the Italian bishops of Pavia, Tortona and Asti; the abbots of Cluny, Cîteaux, Clairvaux and Pontigny; and John of Lexington, representing Henry III of England. The value of the victory therefore lay at least as much in the identity of the captives as in the destruction of the enemy fleet.

The violence of the engagement impressed contemporaries. Matthew Paris recorded:

A most bloody fight then ensued at sea between the Pisans ... and the Genoese in which the Genoese were defeated, and the prelates and legates were made prisoners, with the exception of some who were slain or drowned

– Matthew Paris, Chr. Maj. IV. 125.

The senior captives were taken first to Pisa and San Miniato and subsequently transported into the Kingdom of Sicily, where they were dispersed among royal fortresses.

== Aftermath ==
The destruction of the Genoese convoy was an extraordinary strategic success for Frederick. The projected Roman council was effectively crippled because a large proportion of its most important western participants never reached Rome. Gregory had hoped to gather a representative body of senior ecclesiastics and diplomatic envoys capable of lending the weight of western Christendom to his struggle with the emperor; instead, two cardinals, numerous bishops and abbots and many of the expected delegates were now royal prisoners. The military victory therefore produced an immediate political effect of unusual directness: the destruction of the convoy destroyed the practical basis upon which the council had been organized.

Frederick publicized the result as a judgment of God vindicating his cause. Circular letters celebrated the destruction of the Genoese fleet and the capture of churchmen whom the imperial chancery represented as active collaborators in Gregory's attack upon the Empire. The papal interpretation was diametrically opposed. The prisoners became martyrs to ecclesiastical liberty and Frederick was increasingly represented in biblical and apocalyptic imagery as a Pharaoh persecuting the Church. The battle therefore became one of the defining propaganda events of the papal-imperial conflict as well as a naval victory.

Its diplomatic consequences were more complicated. Louis IX of France reacted angrily to the imprisonment of French bishops and demanded their release, regarding their detention as an affront to himself and his kingdom. Frederick refused, maintaining that the churchmen had knowingly participated in Gregory's campaign against him. The captives also became valuable political hostages. Their detention deprived Gregory of supporters, generated pressure for renewed negotiation and offered Frederick bargaining assets in subsequent dealings with the College of Cardinals. Otto of Tonengo was eventually released after moving considerably closer to the imperial position; the fate of the prisoners remained an important issue in negotiations long after Gregory's death.

The victory also demonstrated the scale and flexibility of Frederick's military system at its early-1240s zenith. He had identified the council as a strategic threat months before the delegates sailed, attempted to control their movement by land, pressured Genoa through military operations and internal political contacts, strengthened the Sicilian fleet, concentrated it with Pisa and placed overwhelming naval power across the route to Rome. The tactical engagement itself was conducted by Enzio, Ansaldo de Mari and their Pisan allies, but the larger operation showed Frederick's capacity to integrate intelligence, diplomacy, political coercion, land operations and maritime force toward a single strategic objective. In that sense Giglio was among the clearest demonstrations of the geographical breadth of Hohenstaufen war-making: an emperor campaigning around Faenza could influence Genoese factional politics, mobilize the resources of Sicily, exploit Pisa's rivalry with Genoa and close the sea route to Rome simultaneously. The result temporarily strengthened Frederick's already formidable position in Italy. Faenza had fallen in April; the Genoese convoy was destroyed in May; Pavia subsequently defeated a Milanese force associated with the papal legate Gregorio da Montelongo; and by the summer Frederick could operate in the Roman countryside and place Gregory under intense pressure. Gregory died on 21 August 1241 with the projected council unrealized. His death, followed by the extremely short pontificate of Celestine IV and a prolonged papal vacancy, further altered the balance of the struggle.

Giglio nevertheless carried a dangerous political legacy for Frederick. The spectacle of an excommunicated emperor capturing cardinals and bishops travelling to a papal council provided his enemies with one of their most powerful charges against him. The episode remained prominent in negotiations with Pope Innocent IV and later in the indictment assembled against Frederick at the First Council of Lyon in 1245. The very effectiveness of the operation therefore sharpened the ideological conflict: an imperial victory that prevented one hostile council also supplied material for the papal case at the council that ultimately declared Frederick deposed.

The wider historical significance of Giglio lies in this fusion of warfare and universal politics. Major medieval naval battles usually turned upon commerce, territory, ports or maritime supremacy. At Giglio the immediate object was the physical control of the personnel of an international ecclesiastical assembly. Its outcome affected the relations of the Empire with France and England, disrupted the government of the Latin Church, intensified the struggle between papacy and empire and became part of the apocalyptic political language through which contemporaries interpreted Frederick II. The victory thus stands among the most consequential naval actions of the thirteenth-century western Mediterranean and among the most striking military episodes of the wider Guelph-Ghibelline conflict.

== See also ==
- Republic of Genoa
- Republic of Pisa
- Maritime republics
- Guelphs and Ghibellines

== Sources ==
- Abulafia, David (1988). Frederick II: A Medieval Emperor. London: Allen Lane. ISBN 978-0-7139-9004-1.
- Grillo, Paolo (2023). Federico II: La guerra, le città e l'Impero. Milan: Mondadori. ISBN 978-88-04-76912-5.
- Stürner, Wolfgang (2000). Friedrich II. Teil 2: Der Kaiser 1220–1250. Darmstadt: Primus Verlag. ISBN 978-3-534-12229-5.
