= Madonna del Morbo, Poppi =

Church in Poppi, Italy

Coordinates: 43.72287°N 11.76602°E

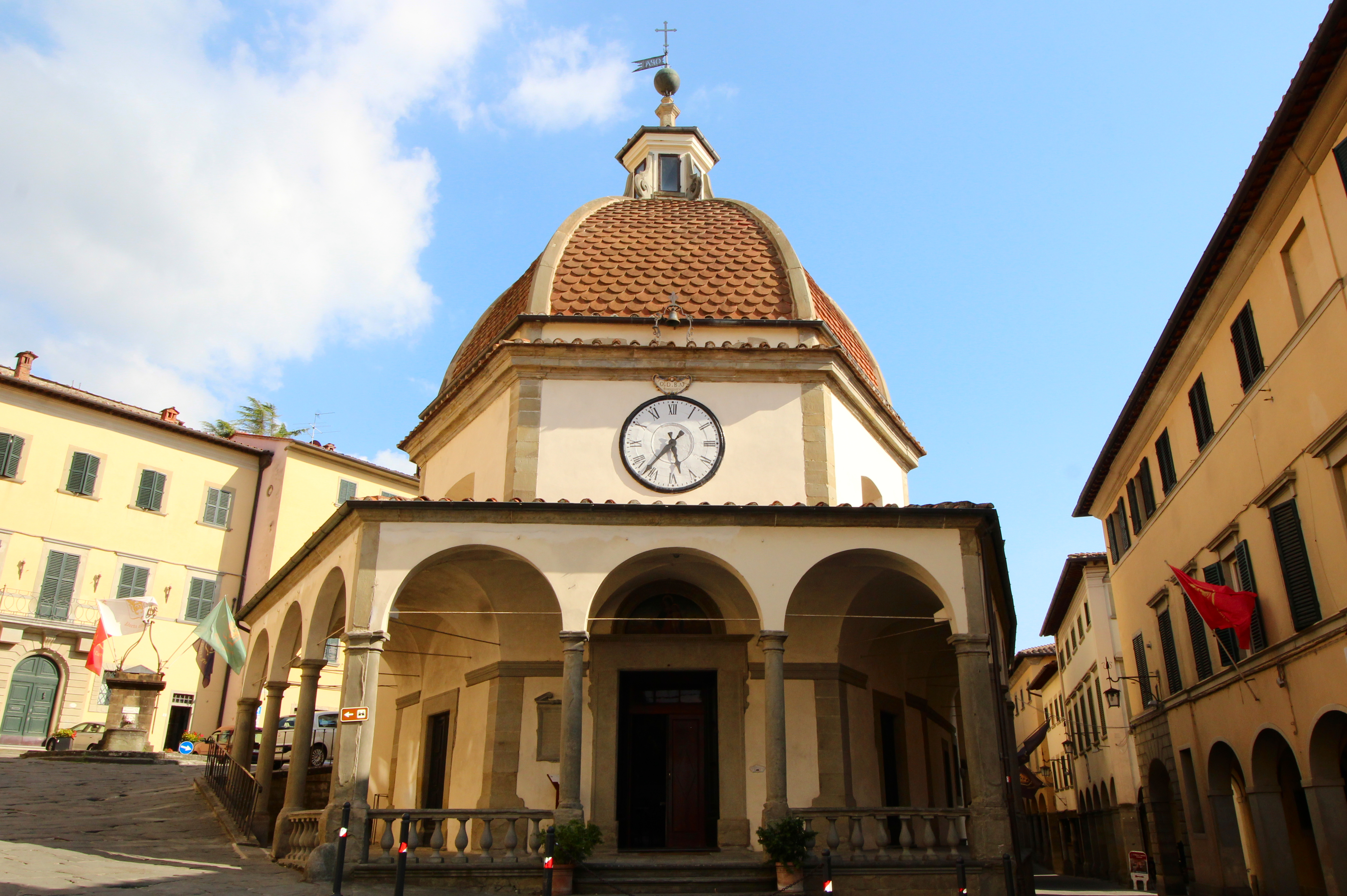
Exterior of the church Madonna del Morbo

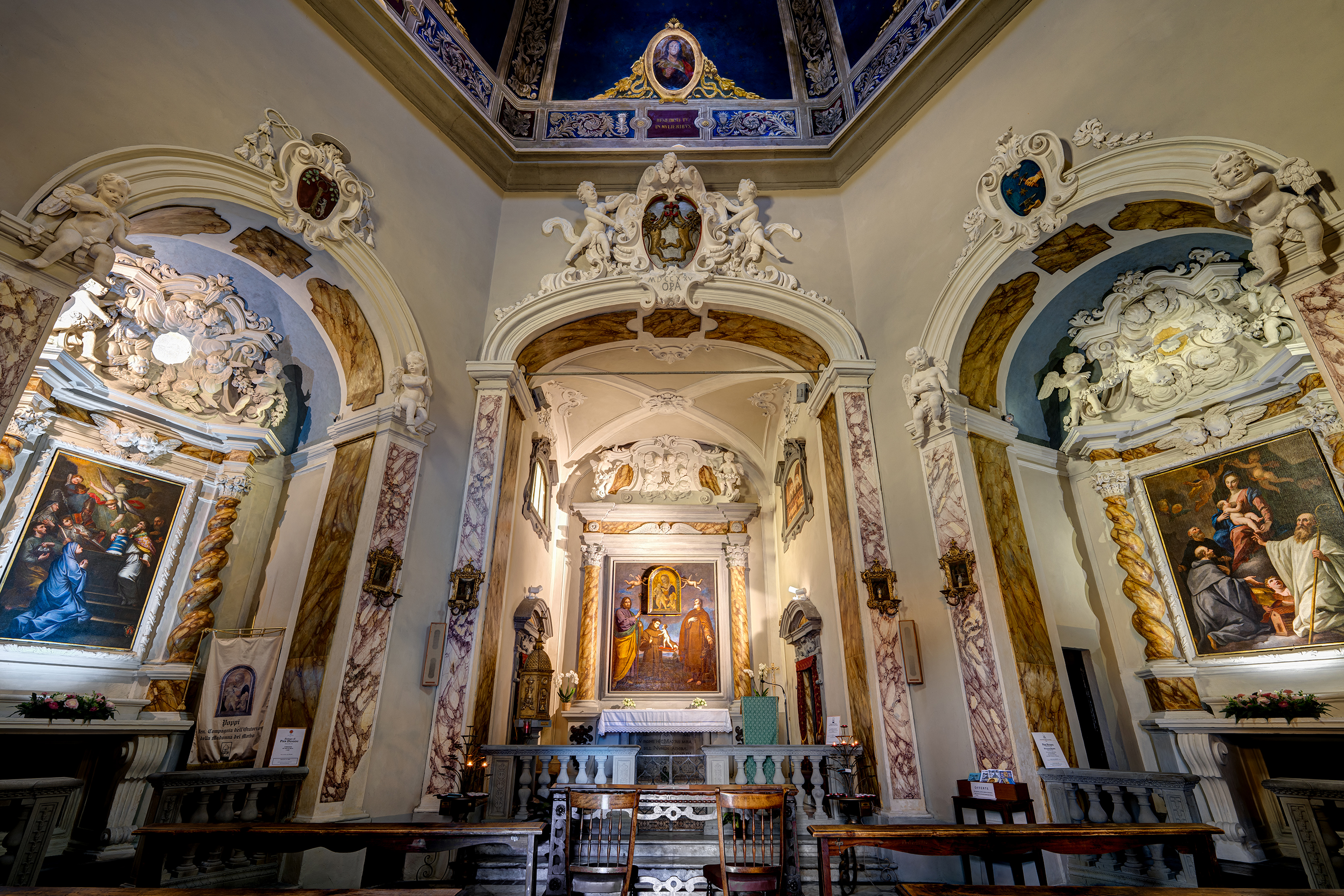
Interior of the Chapel of the Madonna del Morbo

Madonna del Morbo (Madonna of the Illness) is a Baroque-style, Roman Catholic church located in piazza Amerighi of the town of Poppi, in the province of Arezzo, region of Tuscany, Italy. The church is part of the Roman Catholic Diocese of Arezzo-Cortona-Sansepolcro.

== History ==
The church was built to a rare hexagonal layout with a rounded dome and facade portico by design of Francesco Folli. The facade has a clock. The Church was dedicated to the Virgin in gratitude for the cessation of the plague. Construction took place from 1657 to 1659. It was deconsecrated in 1705. The main altar has a Madonna and Child with Young St John the Baptist, also called the Madonna del Canto, painted by a follower of Filippino Lippi.

Two other canvases are by Pier Dandini and his studio respectively: Coronation of the Virgin between Saints Francis, Romuald, and Torello and a Imposition of the Holy Name of Mary.
