= Tommaso Crudeli =

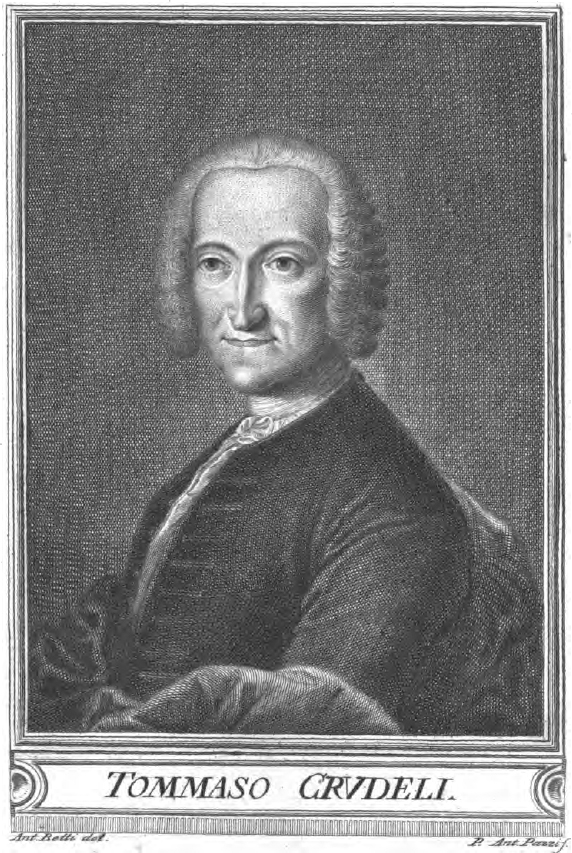
Tommaso Crudeli

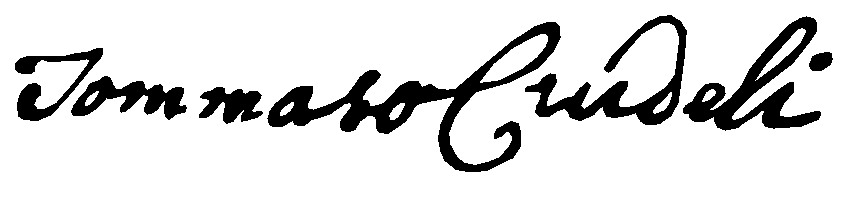
Signature Tommaso Crudeli (1735)

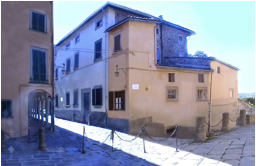
Palazzo Crudeli, Poppi, 2008.

Tommaso Baldasarre Crudeli (December 21, 1702 – March 27, 1745) was a Florentine free thinker who was imprisoned by the Roman Inquisition. He was a poet, lawyer, champion of free thought and is remembered as the first martyr of Universal Freemasonry.

== Biography ==
Tommaso was born into a wealthy family from the Casentino (upper Arno), whose history dated back to the 12th century, albeit with several changes of name. The eponym is related to the story of the expulsion of Count Guidi from the castle of Poppi in 1440. Eventually, turning to Jacopo Crusca, leader of the revolt, he said "Vos quoque crudeles" and got the answer "in crudelitates fides". From this episode the family was appointed as "Crudeli" (meaning "cruels").

The Palazzo Crudeli (15th century) was the most important building after the castle and churches within the walls of Poppi, thanks to the economic strength of the family. The prosperity of the lineage is also understandable as all generations have graduated from the University of Pisa continuously since 1502. Tommaso was the seventh graduating in Utroque Jure in Pisa in 1726. His mentor was Bernardo Tanucci (Premier of Naples and Sicily Kingdom) during the preparation of studies and university years.

Tommaso stayed in Venice with the Counts Contarini, before returning to Florence as professor of Italian for the expatriate English colony. For his lively intellect and his boldness, Tommaso was initiated on May 5, 1735, into the English Lodge, an offshoot of the Grand Lodge of England, and the first Masonic Lodge in Italy. He became secretary, but later became a scapegoat for the growing conflict between the Vatican and the English Freemasonry. Tommaso suffered a long imprisonment (May 1739 – April 1741) on uncertain charges, which was later commuted to perpetual house arrest. Bed-bound at the end of his life, he died from the after-effects of torture and imprisonment on 27 March 1745 in Poppi. He had time to dictate a long report ordered by the Grand Duke on the basis of which the Inquisition Tribunal of Florence was finally closed, in 1744, while Tommaso was still alive. The Roman Inquisition as a whole was increasingly limited from the mid-18th Century as nobles sought to curtail its power.

== Chronology ==
- December 21, 1702 – Born at Poppi (Arezzo, Tuscany)
- 1726 – Law degree in Pisa
- 1733 – Fifth Italian adept of the Masonic lodge in Florence (the first in Italy, founded by English agent Philipp von Stosch)
- May 9, 1739 – Arrested in Florence by the Holy Inquisition, imprisoned for 16 months in S. Croce Church
- April 1741 – Released from prison and sentenced to house arrest in Poppi
- March 27, 1745 – Died in Poppi and was buried in a common grave in S. Fedele Abbey
- October 15, 1747 – Literary works were put on the Index Librorum Prohibitorum and burned in Piazza della Signoria in Florence
