= Museo e Arboreto Carlo Siemoni =

Museum and arboretum in Tuscany, Italy

Coordinates: 43°43′N 11°46′E

See also the Arboreto Siemoni, a small arboretum within the Arboreti di Vallombrosa.

The Museo e Arboreto Carlo Siemoni is a museum and historic arboretum located in Badia Prataglia, Poppi, Province of Arezzo, Tuscany, Italy.

The arboretum was established in 1846 by Karl Simon (Carlo Siemoni) for Leopold II, Grand Duke of Tuscany, and the museum now occupies the duke's former villa. Today the arboretum contains a good collection of native and non-native trees including the following species:

- Gymnospermae
  - Cupressaceae - Calocedrus decurrens, Chamaecyparis lawsoniana, Cupressus arizonica, Juniperus virginiana, Thuja plicata, Thuja occidentalis, Thuja orientalis
  - Ginkgoaceae - Ginkgo biloba
  - Pinaceae - Abies alba, Abies cephalonica, Abies nebrodensis, Abies pinsapo, Cedrus atlantica, Cedrus deodara, Cedrus libani, Picea excelsa, Picea smithiana, Pinus laricio, Pinus leucodermis, Pinus nigra, Pinus strobus, Pinus wallichiana, Pseudotsuga menziesii
  - Taxaceae - Taxus baccata
  - Taxodiaceae - Cryptomeria japonica, Sequoia sempervirens, Sequoiadendron giganteum
- Angiospermae
  - Aceraceae - Acer campestre, Acer lobelii, Acer opalus, Acer pseudoplatanus, Acer platanoides
  - Aquifoliaceae - Ilex aquifolium
  - Araliaceae - Hedera helix
  - Beulaceae - Alnus glutinosa, Alnus incana, Betula pendula
  - Bignoniaceae - Catalpa bignonioides
  - Buxaceae - Buxus sempervirens
  - Caprifoliaceae - Sambucus nigra, Viburnum lantana, Viburnum tinus
  - Celastraceae - Euonymus europaeus, Euonymus latifolius
  - Cornaceae - Cornus mas, Cornus sanguinea
  - Corylaceae - Corylus avellana, Carpinus betulus, Ostrya carpinifolia
  - Ericaceae - Arbutus unedo
  - Facaceae - Castanea sativa, Fagus sylvatica, Quercus borealis, Quercus cerris, Quercus petraea, Quercus pubescens, Quercus robur
  - Hamamelidaceae - Liquidambar styraciflua
  - Hippocastanaceae - Aesculus hippocastanum
  - Juglandaceae - Juglans regia, Juglans nigra
  - Leguminsosae - Gleditschia triacanthos, Laburnum alpinum, Laburnum anagyroides, Robinia pseudoacacia
  - Magnoliaceae - Liriodendron tulipifera
  - Meliaceae - Melia azedarach
  - Malvaceae - Hibiscus syriacus
  - Oleaceae - Fraxinus excelsior, Fraxinus ornus, Syringa vulgaris
  - Platanaceae - Platanus × hispanica, Platanus orientalis
  - Rosaceae - Chaenomeles japonica, Eryobotrya japonica, Malus domestica, Mespilus germanica, Prunus avium, Prunus cerasifera, Prunus communis, Prunus spinosa, Sorbus aria, Sorbus domestica, Sorbus torminalis
  - Rutaceae - Zanthoxylum simulans
  - Salicaceae - Populus tremula, Populus alba, Salix alba, Salix caprea, Salix matsudana, Salix purpurea, Salix viminalis
  - Saxifragaceae - Philadelphus coronarius
  - Tiliaceae - Tilia platyphyllos
  - Ulmaceae - Celtis australis, Ulmus minor, Ulmus glabra, Ulmus laevis

== See also ==
- List of botanical gardens in Italy
