= Iacopo Rusticucci =

Florentine politician (13th century)

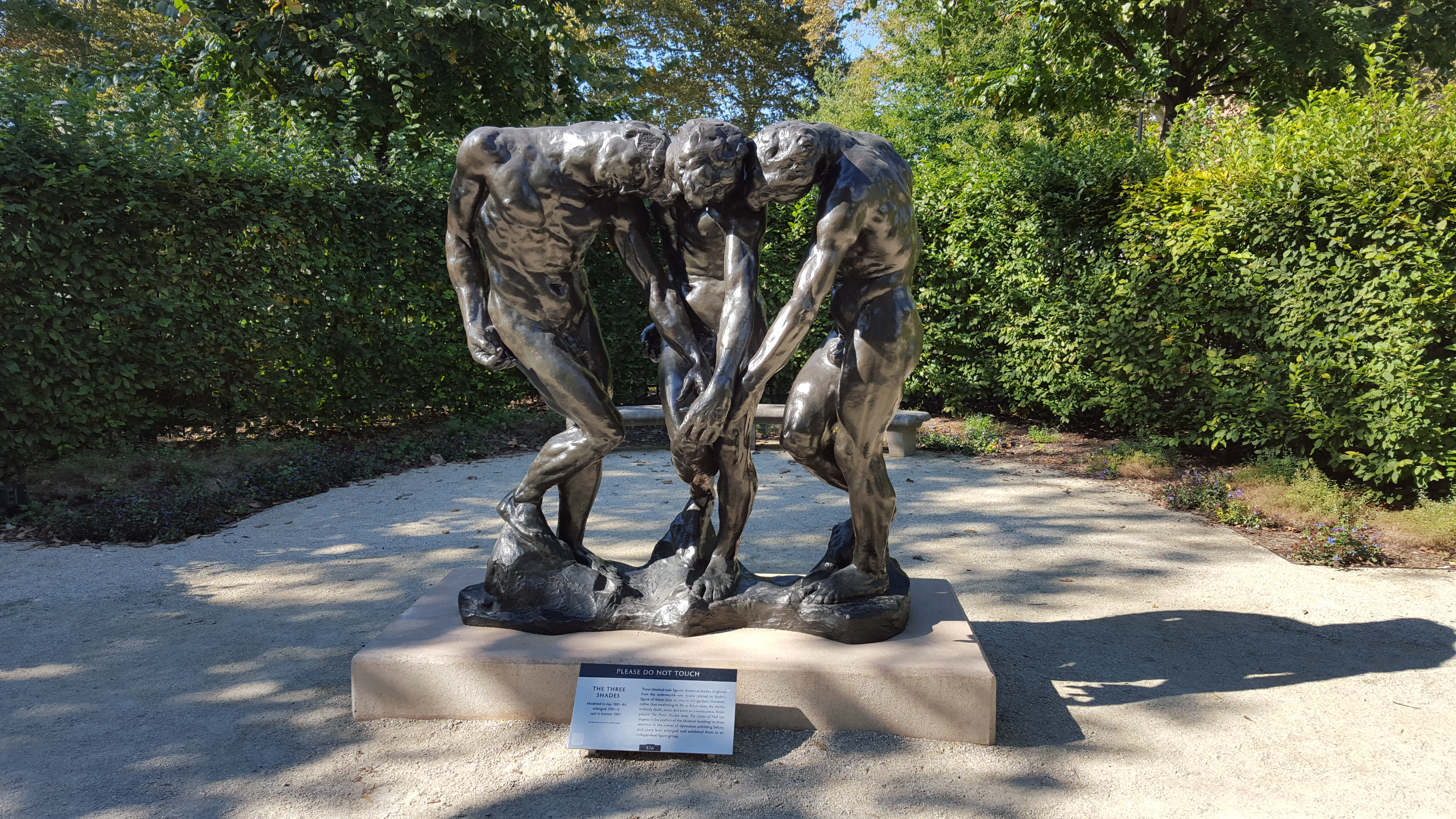
Auguste Rodin's Three Shades: a depiction of Rusticucci, Tegghiaio, and Guerra

Iacopo Rusticucci (around 1200 – after 1266; sometimes anglicized as Jacopo Rusticucci) was a Guelph politician and accomplished orator who lived and worked in Florence, Italy in the 13th century. Rusticucci is realized historically primarily in relation to the Adimari family, who wielded much power and prestige in thirteenth-century Florence, and to whom it is thought Rusticucci was a close companion, representative, and perhaps lawyer. Despite his association with men born into high political and social rank, Rusticucci was not born into nobility, and nothing is known of his ancestors or predecessors. The exact dates of his birth and death are unknown.

== Role in Florentine Politics ==
Iacopo Rusticucci's role as a Guelph politician is indicated by documents which mention his part in important political moments and which consistently align him with prominent Guelphs, and by Dante Alighieri in his depiction of Rusticucci in the Divine Comedy. In thirteenth-century central Italy, the Guelphs and their rival counterpart, the Ghibellines, were political factions aligned with the papacy and the Roman Empire, respectively. Thirteenth-century documents indicate that Rusticucci received payment from the city of Florence for his leadership in a political-military endeavour (involving the strife between Guelphs and the Ghibellines). He also received payment on behalf of a member of the Adimari family, a transaction indicative of the kind of role—lawyer, representative—Rusticucci likely assumed in his relations with the family. Also, and despite not knowing his origins or what became of his estate posthumously, Rusticucci is mentioned in a document which records a list of the destruction inflicted upon Guelph property during Ghibelline domination in Florence. This list reveals that Rusticucci was a property owner. Indeed, the homes of Rusticucci and Tegghiaio Aldobrandi, of the Adimari family, stood side by side in Florence.

== In Dante Alighieri's Divine Comedy ==
Rusticucci is memorialized in Canto XVI of Dante's Inferno in the ring of the sodomites for his crimes against nature and therefore God (Inferno XI). He will suffer here for all of eternity in the company of two other men of political and social prominence: Tegghiaio Aldobrandi, a member of the aforementioned Adimari family, and Guido V Guerra, of the high-ranking and powerful Conti Guidi family. Before the reader meets Rusticucci, he is alluded to in Canto VI of Inferno in a conversation between Dante and a sinner named Ciacco — thought by some to be the Florentine poet Ciacco dell' Anguillaia and by others to be a sinner with no real-world counterpart. Dante speaks to Ciacco in the circle of gluttony, to which Ciacco has been relegated.

After having listened to Ciacco speak of Florence's future, Dante asks after five men he's not yet encountered on his journey, men "who were so worthy... and... whose minds were bent on doing good" (VI.79–81). These men are Rusticucci, Tegghiaio, Arrigo (a Florentine Ghibelline not named again in the Divine Comedy), Farinata degli Uberti, and Mosca dei Lamberti, each of whom Dante seems eager to meet. In response, Ciacco tells Dante that these men are "among the blacker souls" (VI.85) who dwell deeper in hell.

Ten cantos later, in Canto XVI, Dante and his guide Virgil arrive at the bottom of the ring of the seventh circle of Hell that houses the sodomites. Almost instantly, three shades approach and recognize Dante by his clothing as a fellow Florentine. Once in front of him, the shades continue to walk in a "wheel" formation, so that they can speak with Dante, maintaining their gaze on him, while also adhering to their punishment — that they should forever be in motion, running beneath a perpetual rain of fire. They are Guerra, Aldobrandi, and Rusticucci, the last of whom speaks on behalf of the group. It is often noted that of all the shades with whom Dante interacts in Hell, these three receive the warmest greeting from the protagonist, despite Dante's having chosen to place them in the circle of sodomy, one of the most egregious sins. Rusticucci first introduces the two men with him, both Guelphs of noble lineages and high political rank when they were alive. He then introduces himself as one who suffers with the sodomites through the fault of his wife. It is thought that this blame is based either in the repulsiveness of Rusticucci's wife (posited perhaps most aggressively by Giovanni Boccaccio), which drove him to find sexual pleasure elsewhere, or in her refusal to have sex with him. Either way, Rusticucci explains his presence in this circle of hell as not being entirely his fault. Rusticucci's role as speaker for the group is thought to be a nod to his success as an orator in when he was alive.

It is at this point, after the introductions are made, that Dante is overcome with the urge to embrace these men who represent to him the golden age of Florentine politics and municipality — "had I been sheltered from the fire I would have thrown myself among them, and I believe my teacher would have let me" (XVI.46–48). Dante's outpouring of compassion and his subsequent praise for the trio is very much unprecedented in any of his interactions in Hell heretofore.

Dante tells the men that he is Florentine, too, and that their reputations precede them: "How many times I've heard your deeds, your honoured names resound! And I, too, spoke your names with affection" (XVI.59–60). The three Florentine shades ask Dante if their city is doing well, to which Dante responds no. In unison, the trio bid Dante successful passage through Hell and make a final request: that Dante should speak them into memory on Earth. Then they run away to join the other sodomites.

=== Dante and Sodomy in the Divine Comedy ===
Dante's favourable treatment of the sodomites is the point of confusion and discussion. Many have wondered at the seeming discrepancy between Dante's having placed these men in Hell for a particularly offensive sin, only to sing their praises and show them compassion upon meeting them. In her writing on the circle of sodomy in Inferno, Susan Noakes posits that the answer to this perplexing contradiction exists in the notion that this narrative play is an instance of Dante's critique of his own political beliefs. Noakes argues that at the time he wrote the Divine Comedy, Dante's views had changed and he had realized that "although the Guelph ideal of civic autonomy [was] attractive on the surface, [it was] ultimately unsatisfying to one who reflects on politics deeply." It is a teaching moment for Dante, taught by Dante. Another position advanced by Dante scholars is that Dante's kind treatment of the sodomites was representative of his personal beliefs about homosexuality and whether it was really such a reprehensible sin.
