= Guido Guerra of Dovadola =

Italian condottiero and politician (1220–1272)

Guido Guerra V (c. 1220–1272) was a politician from Florence, Italy. Aligned with the Guelph faction, Guerra had a prominent role in the political conflicts of mid-thirteenth century Tuscany. He was admired by Dante Alighieri, who granted him honor in the Divine Comedy, even though he placed Guerra in Hell among sinners of sodomy.

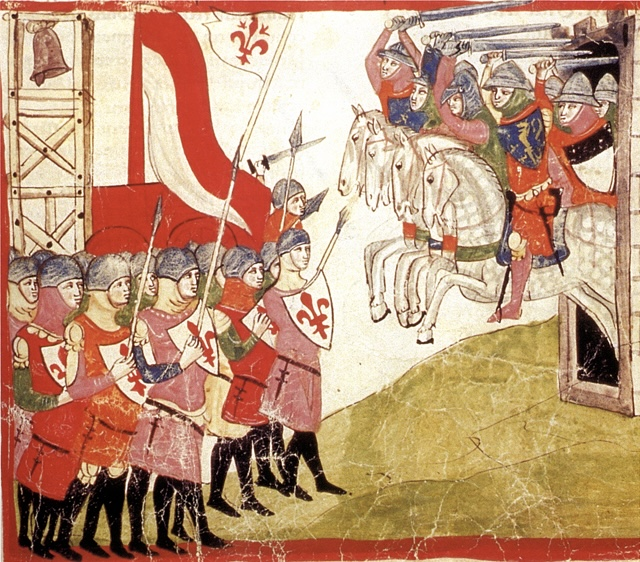
The Battle of Montaperti, where Guido and the Guelphs suffered a defeat at the hands of the Ghibellines in 1260. They would return in 1266.

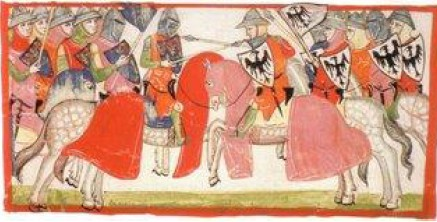
The Battle of Benevento, where Guido lead the Guelphs in the retaking of Florence in 1266.

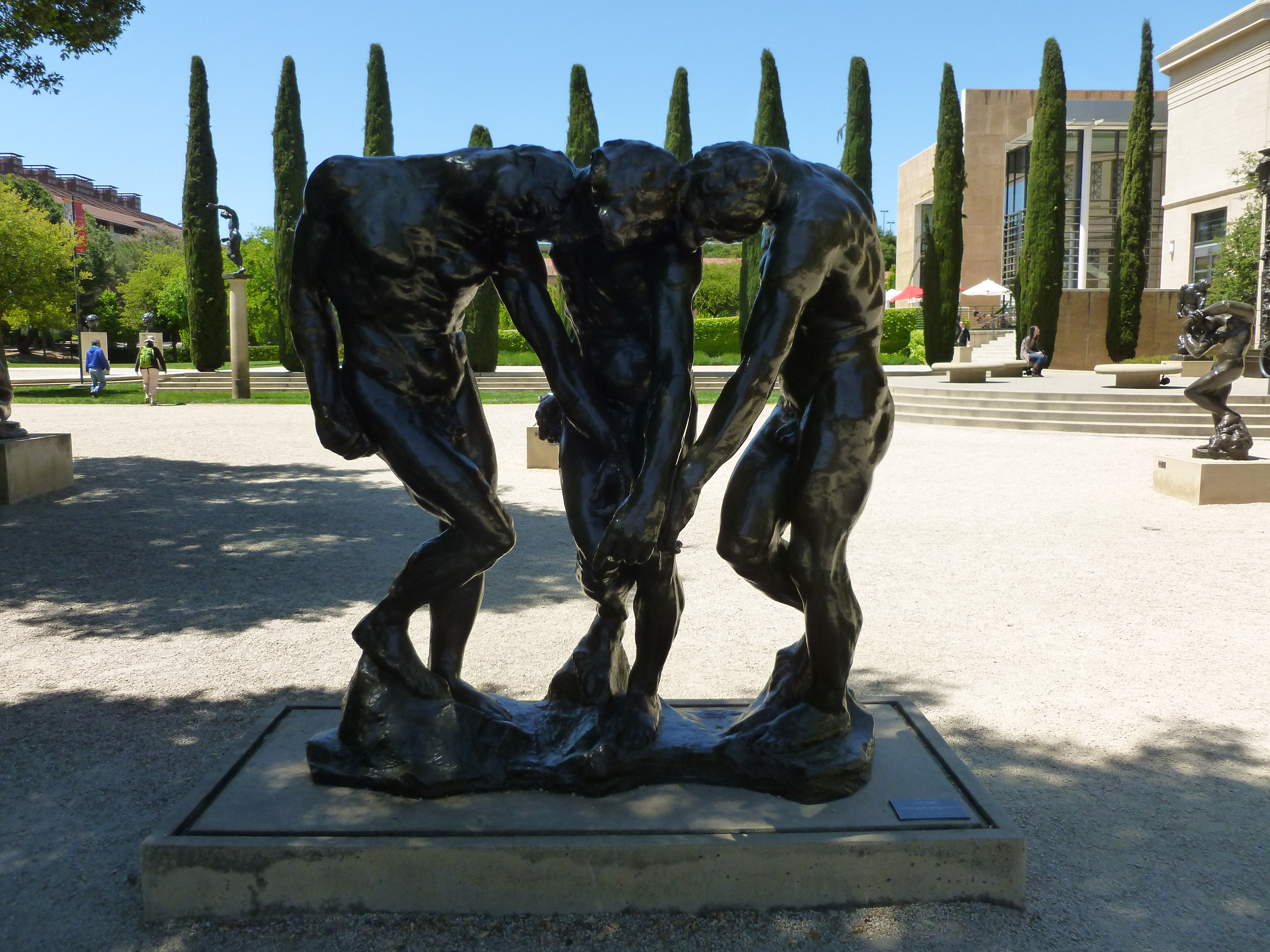
Sculpture of "The Three Shades" by Rodin, depicting Guerra, Aldobrandi, and Rusticucci in Hell.

== Biography ==
=== Background ===
Descended from the house of Conti Guidi, Guerra was the son of Count Marcovaldo and Beatrice degli Alberti di Capraia, and grandson of Guido Guerra IV and Gualdrada de' Ravignani. He succeeded his father as head of the Dovadola branch of the family in 1229.

=== A Guelph Leader ===
Guerra was a Florentine politician, closely aligned with the Guelph faction. In the eleventh and thirteenth centuries, Florence was fought over by two rival factions, the Guelphs, who believed in the authority of the Church, and the Ghibellines, who believed in the authority of the monarchy and Empire. Guerra was connected with the Catholic Church, as his political faction believed in the power of the Church, and he was supported and encouraged by Pope Innocent IV. In this role, Guido received the title of Capitaneus pro Ecclesia ("Captain of the Church") in 1248.

In 1258, the Guelphs held the power in Florence and expelled the Ghibellines from the city. Later on, the Ghibellines, led by Provenzano Salvani, retook Florence in one of the bloodiest battles in the history of medieval Italy, the Battle of Montaperti of 1260. While in power, with fellow Guelph Tegghiaio Aldobrandi, Guerra consuls the Florentines to not engage in open battle in Siena in the hopes of avoiding the defeat of Montaperti. After the battle, Guerra found refuge in nearby Romagna until he was able to return.

A few years later, Guerra led an army of four hundred Florentine Guelphs, aided by the cavalry, in the reclaiming of Florentine from the Ghibellines, which culminated in the Battle of Benevento in 1266. In this battle, the Florentine Guelphs, helped by Anjou cavalry, succeeded in defeating the Ghibellines. In battle, they killed King Manfred, and thus reclaimed Florence.

=== Final Years ===
After the Battle of Benevento, Guerra continued to participate in the politics of Florence. He advocated for the inclusion of the middle class (popolo) in the city governance, but this reform was firmly ostracized and eventually revoked due to the pressure of the papal curia. Having reached the end of his life, Guerra died in 1272 in his castle in Montevarchi, near Arezzo.

== In Dante's Divine Comedy ==
Guerra appears as a character in Dante’s Divine Comedy in Inferno, Canto XVI, when Dante and Virgil encounter those punished for sins of sodomy. Guido appears accompanied by fellow Sodomites, Tegghiaio Aldobrandi and Iacopo Rusticucci, who speaks for all three.

According to Dante and medieval Christian views of sexuality, the Sodomites sinned against nature, using practices designed for reproduction for other uses and pleasure. Sinners are not punished for homosexuality, but instead for sodomy, evidenced by the presence of homosexuals in Purgatory. As such, their punishment is to run around on burning sand as they were unable to obey God's commandments regarding reproduction, misusing it for their own pleasure. They run under a rain of fire, a reflection upon the unnatural nature of their acts.

Dante grants Guerra, Aldobrandi, and Rusticucci a measure of respect, and is moved by their suffering. He portrays them "good" men condemned to Hell.
