= Poppi Castle =

Coordinates: 43.723157°N 11.767885°E

Poppi Castle, or Castello dei Conti Guidi
- Poppi, Tuscany
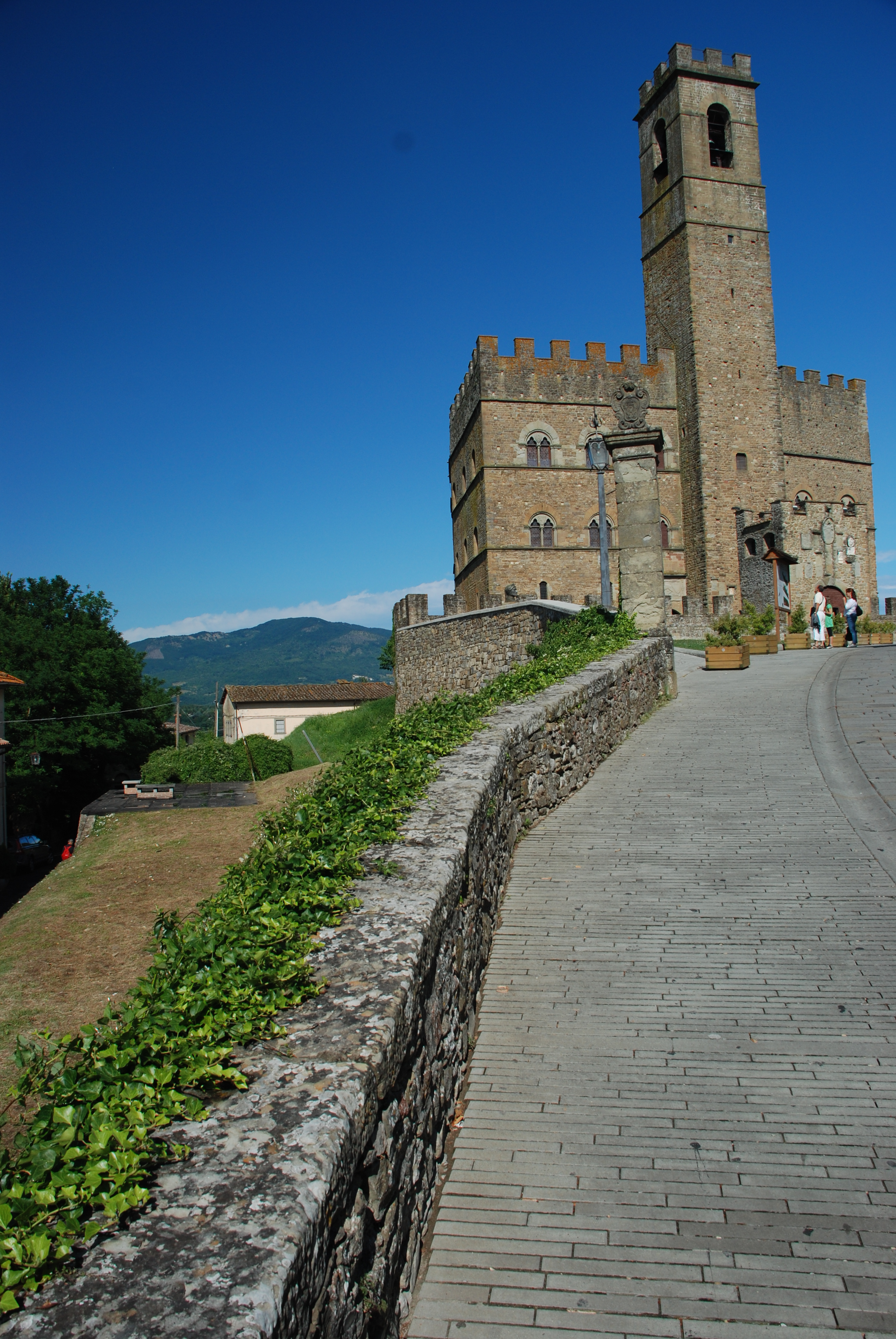
- Poppi Castle Viewed from the north

Site information
- Owner: Commune of Poppi
- Condition: Occupied

Site history
- Built: Circa 1290
- Materials: Sandstone
- Events: Battle of Anghiari

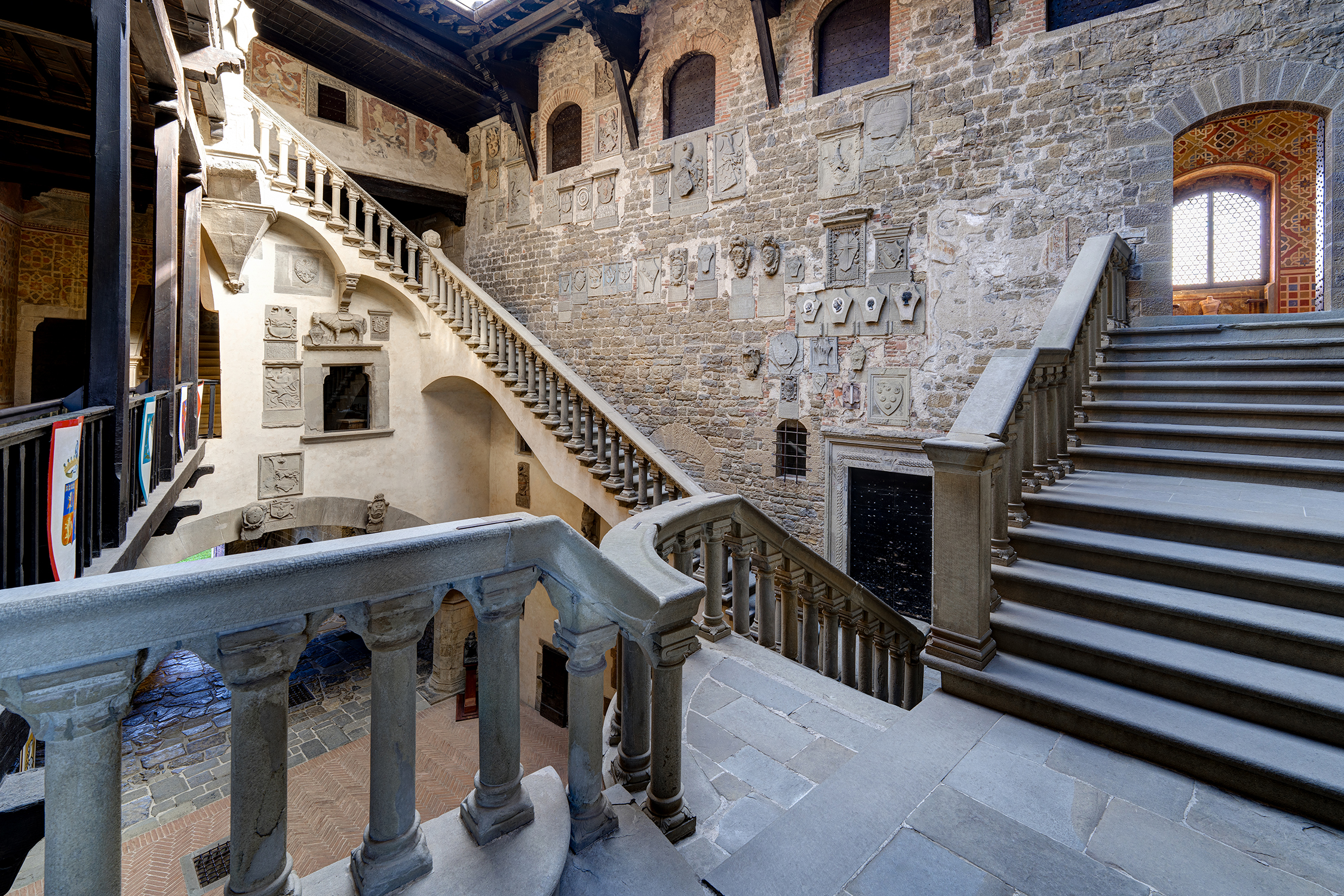
Grand Staircase, Poppi Castle

Poppi Castle (Italian: Castello di Poppi, or the Castello dei Conti Guidi) is a medieval castle in Poppi, Tuscany, Italy, formerly the property of the noble Guidi family.

== History ==
=== Medieval ===
The first written mention of the castle at Poppi is in 1169, when it belonged to the Abbey of San Fidele de Strumi, but documentation from the 1190's shows that by this time, it had passed to the Counts Guidi. For the next 350 years, the Guidi family would have, largely unchallenged, control of the Casentino. Other castles on the Casentino hills including Romena and Porciano, also ruled by the Guidi counts.

Although the early documentation of the castle relates to the end of the twelfth century, the construction of the foundations would suggest a fortification had been on the site even earlier. In the second half of the thirteenth century the first parts of the castle, as seen today, were built, with the tower and the keep to the left.

The architect is said to be Arnolfo di Cambio, who used Poppi as a 'prototype' for the Palazzo Vecchio, which he also designed. The two buildings certainly do look similar, and originally, the tower of Poppi would have been taller, with machicolations (projecting parapets with 'murder holes' for dropping various missiles on the enemy beneath) that would have made the appearance even more similar.

In later years, a new keep was added to the right of the tower, and this became part of the residence, but with a jail below. At the end of the thirteenth century, Count Simone Guidi was responsible for enlarging the mullioned windows to create a more elegant facade.

=== Renaissance ===
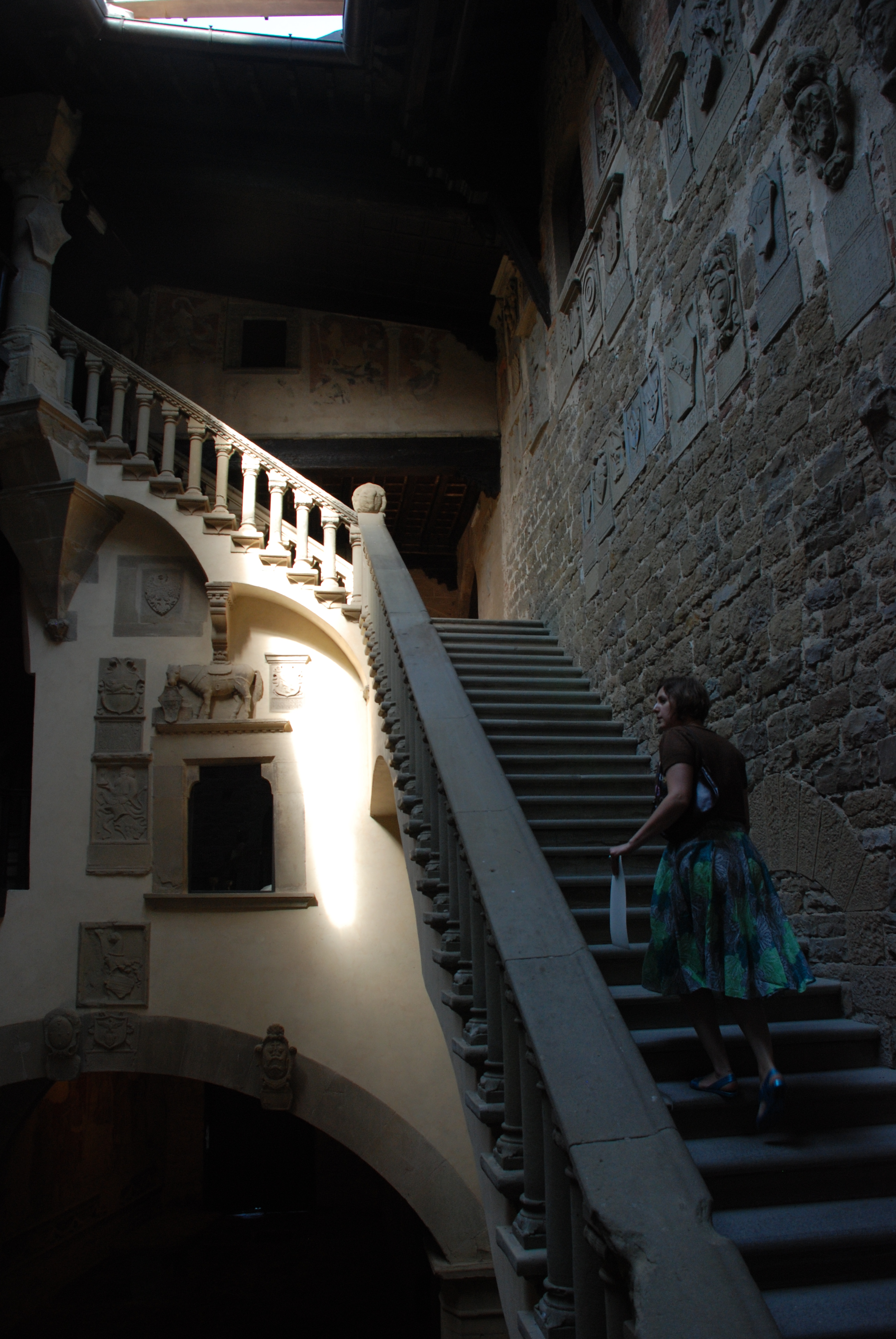
Main staircase

Further additions to the castle over the next 150 years allowed the inner courtyard to be created and the magnificent stone staircase to be built in 1470. Over the years, the walls by the staircase have been covered with coats of arms of the Florentine families that ruled Poppi in the fifteenth and sixteenth centuries.

Leading off the inner courtyard is the Guidi Chapel, covered in frescos by Taddeo Gaddi, a pupil of Giotto.

Lightning struck the tower during the 19th century and it was subsequently re-modelled to its present form.

== Defense ==
Poppi has been involved in two major battles over the course of its history, both of which have had important implications for the political direction of the whole Casentino.

The first took place very close by, on 11 June 1289, at Campaldino. The Guidi Count of the time, Count Guido Novello, was a Ghibelline supporter and as such aligned with Arezzo, rather than the Guelphs of Florence. When the Aretine and Florentine armies marched to do battle, Poppi took the side of Arezzo. Unfortunately for Poppi the Ghibelline forces were quashed and Poppi had to defer to the rule of Florence. Dante was said to be present at the Battle of Campaldino, as a young man of 24 in the Florentine Guelph party, but historians disagree whether he actually took part. Despite the Guidis losing in the battle they continued to rule over the Casentino for another 150 years.

In 1440 at the Battle of Anghiari, the Guidi's again took the wrong side and again took sides against Florence. When the Milanese were defeated by the Florentine army under the command of Niccoio Picciniono, Count Francesco dei Guidi was forced to surrender. Lucky to be spared with his life, the Guidi dynasty finally came to an end in the Casentino and they were exiled, and Poppi continued to be ruled by Florence up until the Unification in 1860.

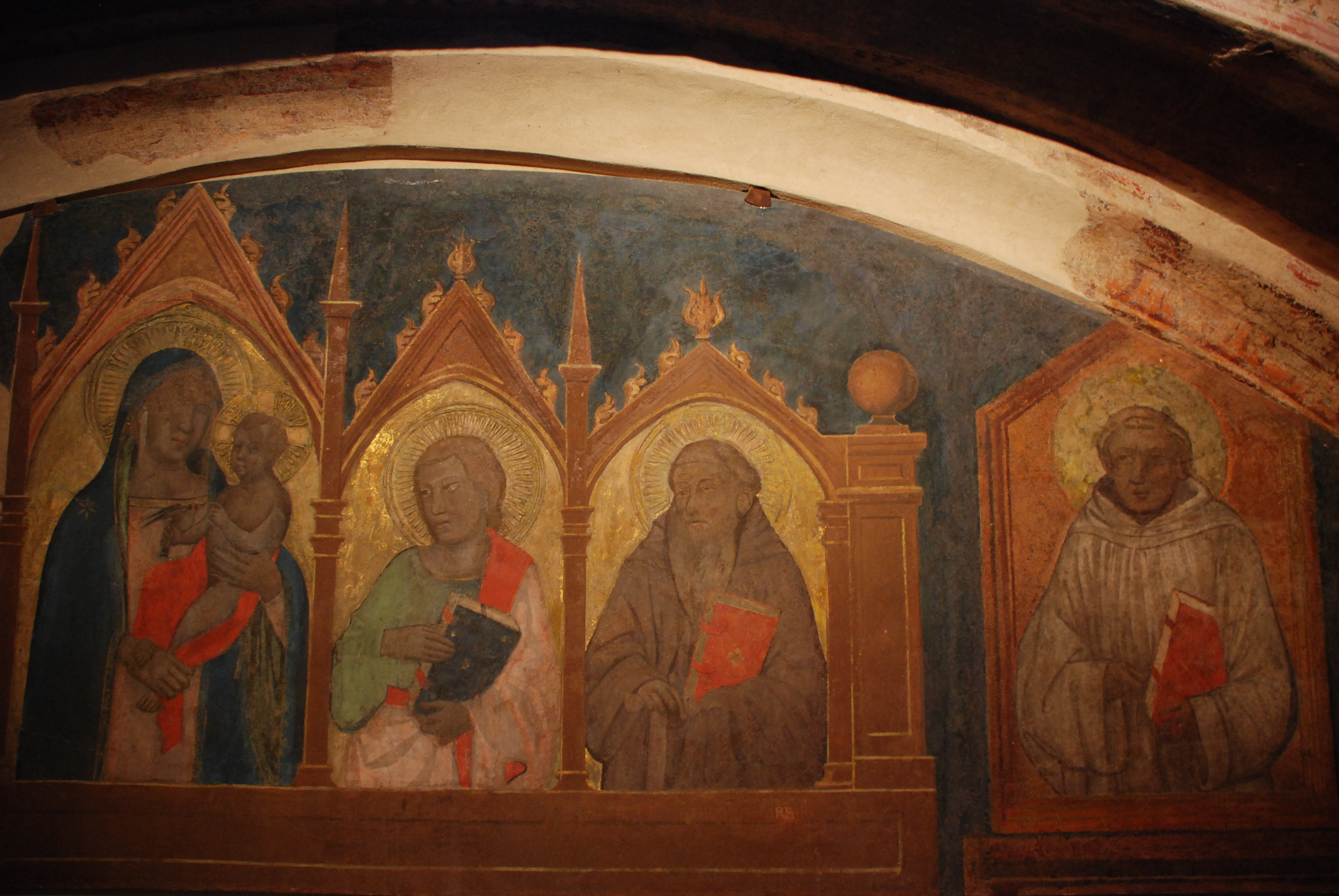
Fresco detail by Taddeo Gaddi, Poppi Castle

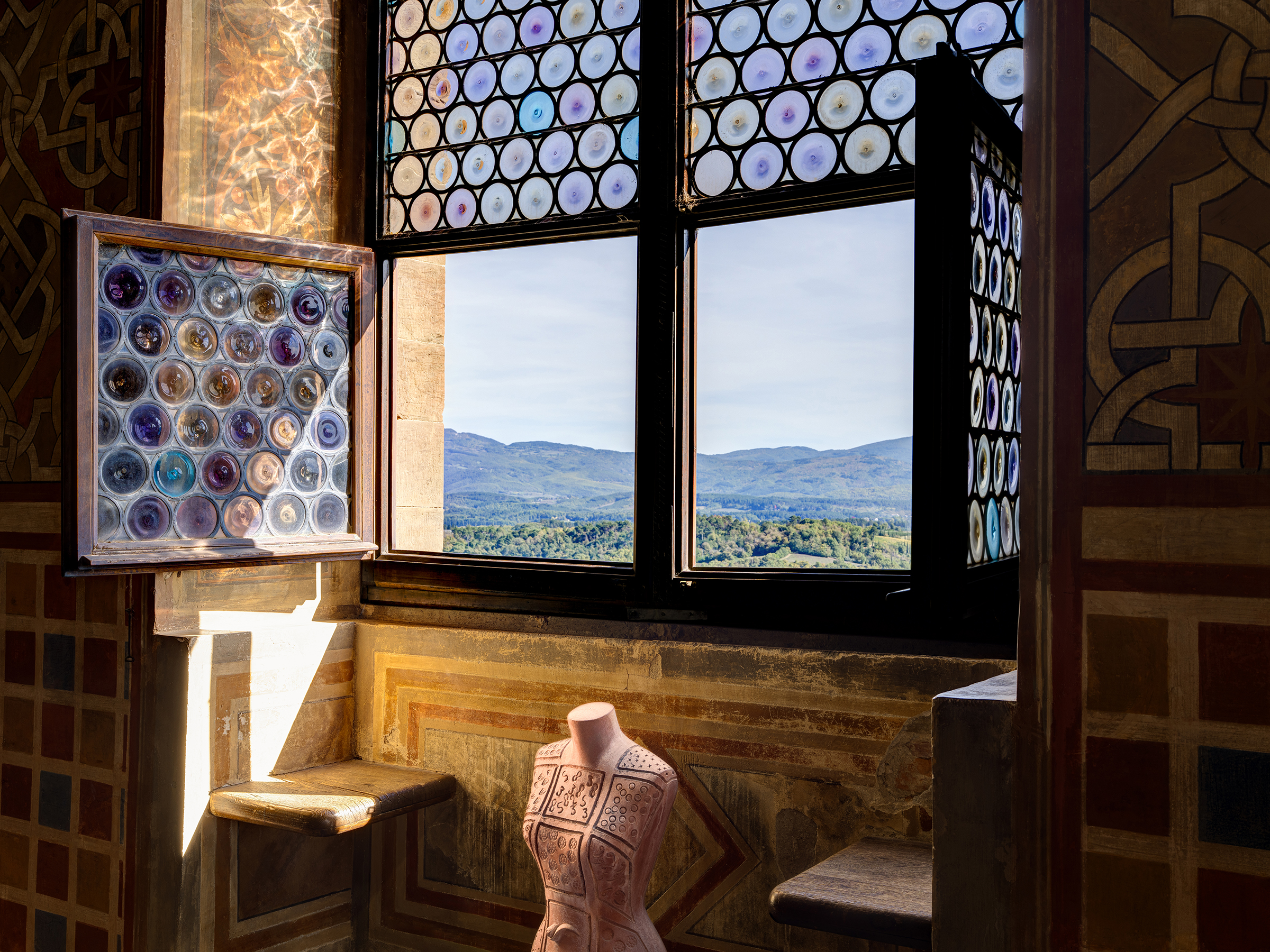
Venetian glass windows, Poppi Castle

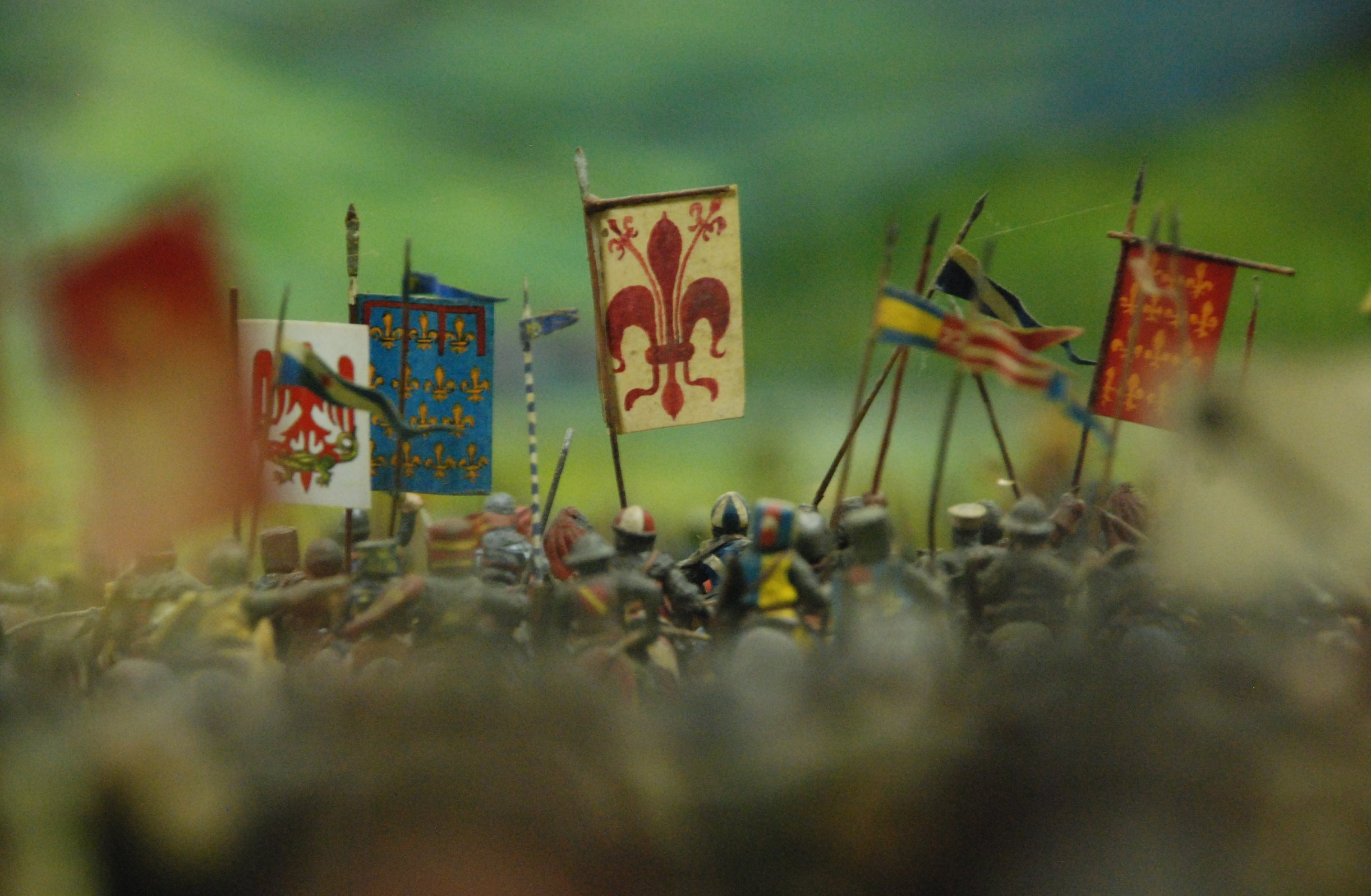
A detail of the Battle of Anghiari diorama, Scale 1:32, located in the castle crypt
