= Gregorio di Montelongo =

Gregorio di Montelongo (or da Monte Longo; c. 1200 – 1269) was the Bishop of Tripoli from 1249 until 1251 and the Patriarch of Aquileia from 1251 until his death.

Gregorio was born in Ferentino into a family related to the counts of Segni, original of Montelongo in Molise. He was papal legate in Lombardy since 1238, where he led the Guelph coalition against emperor Frederick II. In 1247, he was sent by Pope Innocent IV to Parma, to lead the city's defense during the imperial siege. In 1251, he was named patriarch of Aquileia, but was consecrated only five years later. He also led the anti-Hohenstaufen party in the region when Frederick's heir, Conrad IV of Germany, incited the Istrian communes to revolt.

Gregorio also participated in the "crusade" against Ezzelino III da Romano, leading personally the defense of Padua in September 1255 and sending troops to the Guelph faction until 1257. He was also able to occupy the Austrian enclave of Pordenone in 1262. Once the Ghibelline menace of Ezzelino had disappeared, he attacked Ulrich III of Carinthia and Albert I of Gorizia. He was however captured by the latter at Villanova dello Judrio of 20 July 1267, being freed only after he promised to sign a treaty of peace (1269). Nevertheless, Gregorio resumed the military operations, but died before he could launch another attack.

Previously, Gregorio had signed a treaty with the Republic of Venice which set the respective areas of influence in the contented Istrian region.

== Sources ==
- Ellero, Gianfranco (1974). Storia dei friulani. Udine: Grafiche Fulvio.

Catholic Church titles
| Preceded by Berthold of Merania | Patriarch of Aquileia; 1251-1269 | Succeeded by Philip of Spanheim |
