= Poppi =

- Comune
- Comune di Poppi
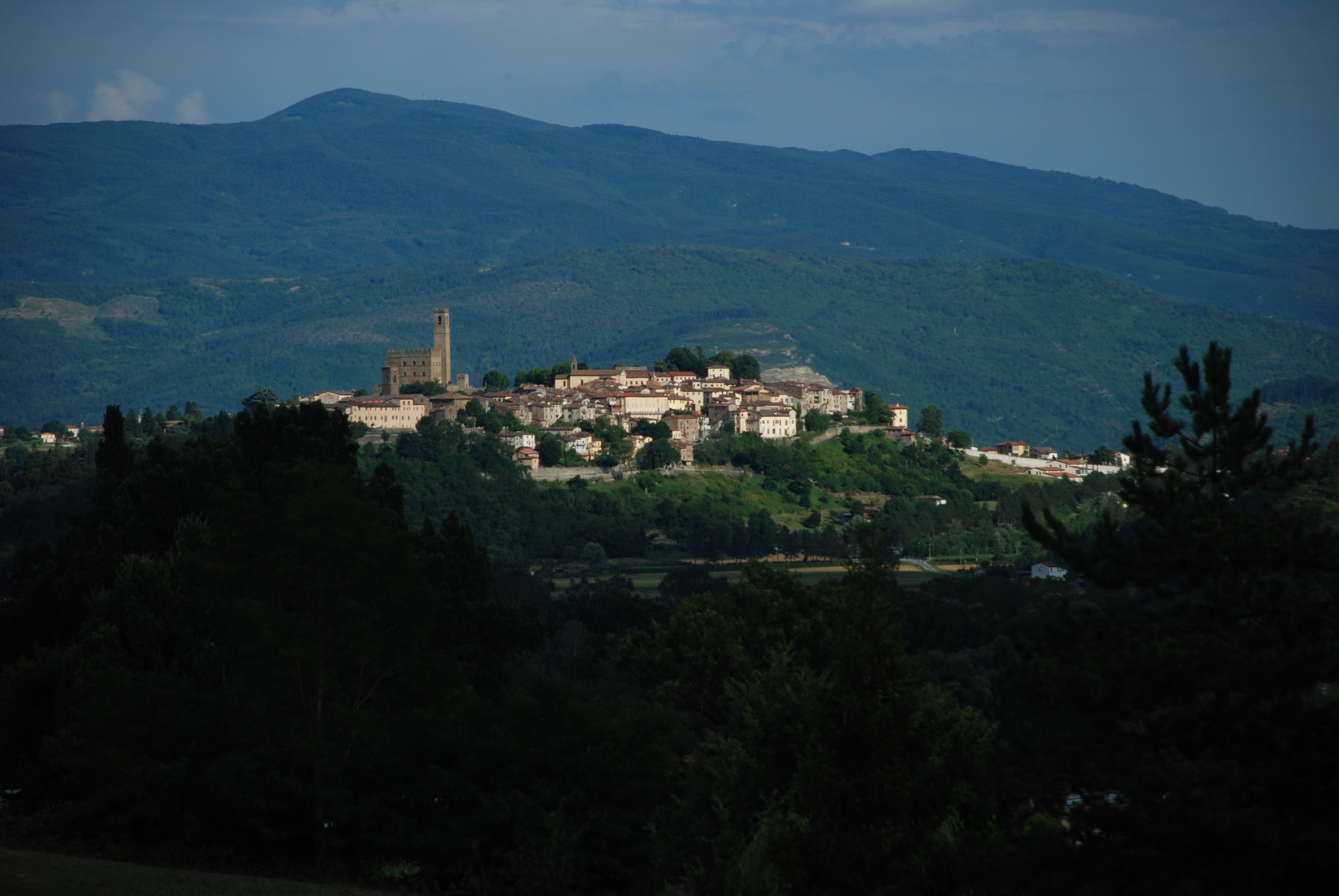
- Poppi Skyline viewed from the North

- Coat of arms

- Location within Italy Location within Tuscany
- Coordinates: 43°43′N 11°46′E
- Country: Italy
- Region: Tuscany
- Province: Arezzo (AR)
- Frazioni: Avena, Badia Prataglia, Becarino, Camaldoli, Larniano, Lierna, Memmenano, Moggiona, Ponte a Poppi, Porrena, Quorle, Quota, Riosecco, Sala, San Martino a Monte, San Martino in Tremoleto.

Government
  - Mayor: Federico Lorenzoni

Area
  - Total: 96.9 km^{2} (37.4 sq mi)
- Elevation: 437 m (1,434 ft)

Population (31 December 2010)
  - Total: 6,369
  - Density: 65.7/km^{2} (170/sq mi)
- Demonym: Poppesi
- Time zone: UTC+1 (CET)
  - Summer (DST): UTC+2 (CEST)
- Postal code: 52014
- Dialing code: 0575
- Patron saint: San Torello
- Saint day: March 16
- Website: Official website

Poppi (Italian pronunciation: [ˈpoppi, ˈpɔ-]) is a comune (municipality) in the Province of Arezzo in the Italian region Tuscany, located about 40 km (25 miles) east of Florence and about 30 km (19 miles) northwest of Arezzo.

Poppi borders the following municipalities: Bibbiena, Castel Focognano, Castel San Niccolò, Chiusi della Verna, Ortignano Raggiolo, Pratovecchio Stia. It is one of I Borghi più belli d'Italia ("The most beautiful villages of Italy").

== Main sights ==
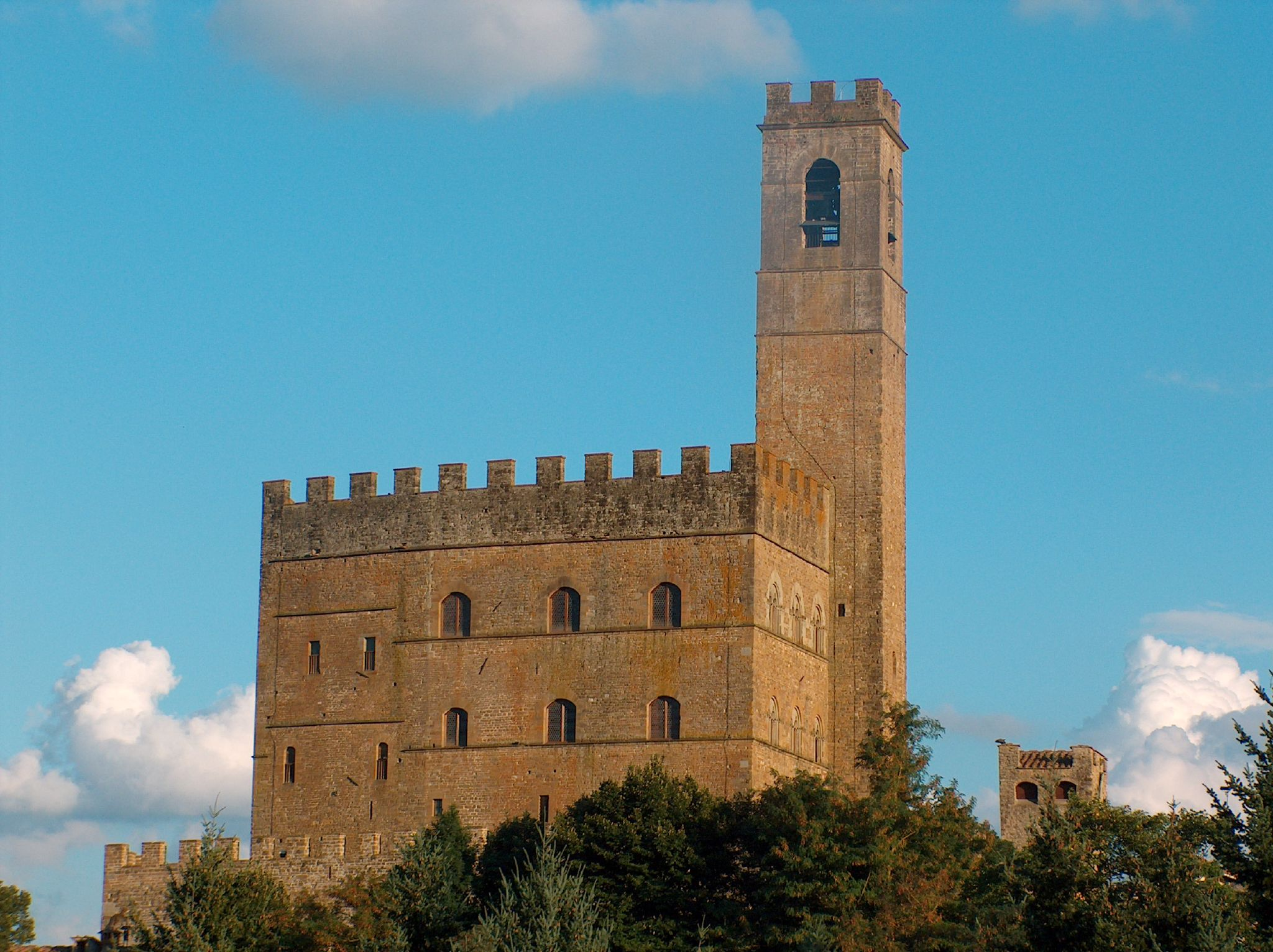
The castle of Poppi

- Poppi Castle, or the Castello dei Conti Guidi, the main building in the Casentino, known from 1191, was owned by the Counts Guidi. It has additions by Arnolfo di Cambio. It has a courtyard, an external staircase, its chapel with frescos and its library containing rare manuscripts and incunabula.
- Holy Hermitage of Camaldoli, the ancestral seat of the Camaldolese monastic order.
- Madonna del Morbo Sanctuary in the centre of the town, containing a painting of the Virgin attributed to Filippino Lippi.
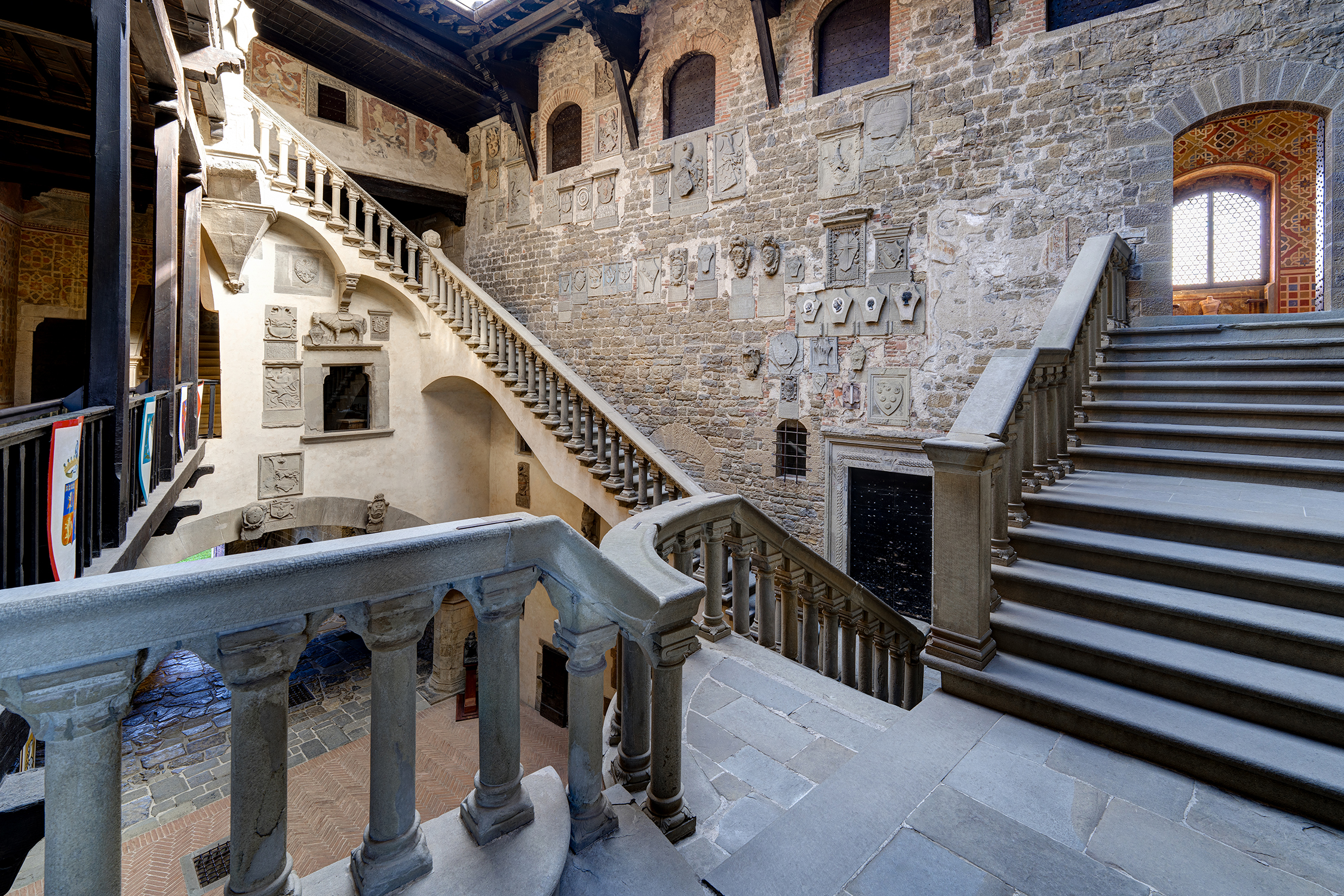
- Grand Staircase, Poppi Castle
  The annual festival commences in the upper town on 29 June, when a large procession bears the image of the Virgin from the Church of Madonna del Morbo to the Church of Saints Marco and Lorenzo, where it remains for the duration of the week.
- The Museo e Arboreto Carlo Siemoni is a historic ducal villa and arboretum in Badia Prataglia, where there is also the Parish Church of Santa Maria Assunta which dates back to the 10th Century.
- Palazzo Crudeli, birthplace of Tommaso Crudeli condemned by the Catholic Church as heretic. He belonged to the first Freemason Lodge of Italy established by the English colony in Florence, 1732. He died in the same Palazzo after torture and imprisonment.
- Museum Affaire Crudeli and Human Rights.
- Saverio, a 19-year old tuxedo cat who serves as Poppi's unofficial mayor.

== Sister cities ==
- Palafolls, Spain, since 1990
- Ax-les-Thermes, France, since 2008
