= Canton of Noyers-sur-Jabron =

Coordinates: 44°10′11″N 5°52′56″E

Noyers-sur-Jabron
- Former canton
- Interactive map of Noyers-sur-Jabron
- Country: France
- Region: Provence-Alpes-Côte d'Azur
- Department: Alpes-de-Haute-Provence
- No. of communes: {{{nbcomm}}}
- Disbanded: 2015
- Area: 195.40 km^{2} (75.44 sq mi)
- Population (2012): 1,425
  - Density: 7.293/km^{2} (18.89/sq mi)

The canton of Noyers-sur-Jabron is a former administrative division in southeastern France. It was disbanded following the French canton reorganisation which came into effect in March 2015. It consisted of 7 communes, which joined the canton of Sisteron in 2015. It had 1,425 inhabitants (2012).

The canton comprised the following communes:

- Bevons
- Châteauneuf-Miravail
- Curel
- Noyers-sur-Jabron
- Les Omergues
- Saint-Vincent-sur-Jabron
- Valbelle

== Demographics ==
Historical population Canton of Noyers-sur-Jabron
Year	1962	1968	1975	1982	1990	1999
Pop.	683	779	721	784	872	1,099
±%	—	+14.1%	−7.4%	+8.7%	+11.2%	+26.0%
From the year 1962 on: No double counting – residents of multiple communes (e.g. students and military personnel) are counted only once. Source: INSEE

== See also ==
- Cantons of the Alpes-de-Haute-Provence department
