= Authon, Alpes-de-Haute-Provence =

Commune in southeastern France

Authon
- Commune
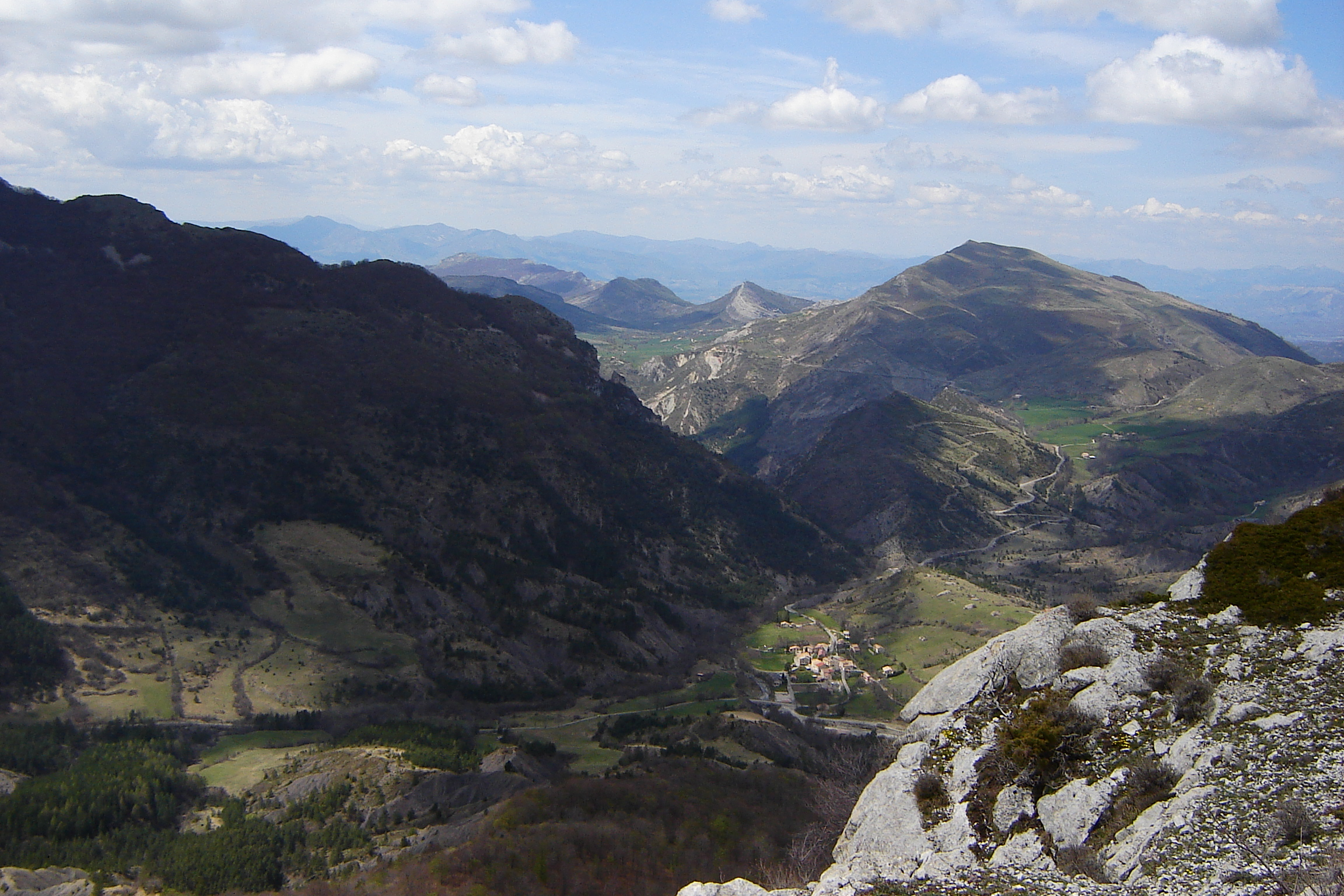
- The village in the Vanson valley

- Coat of arms
- Location of Authon
- Location within France Location within Provence-Alpes-Côte d'Azur
- Coordinates: 44°14′21″N 6°07′38″E
- Country: France
- Region: Provence-Alpes-Côte d'Azur
- Department: Alpes-de-Haute-Provence
- Arrondissement: Forcalquier
- Canton: Sisteron
- Intercommunality: Sisteronais Buëch

Government
  - Mayor (2026–32): Jean-Paul Brouchon
- Area^{1}: 40.16 km^{2} (15.51 sq mi)
- Elevation: 1,137 m (3,730 ft)
- Highest elevation: 2,114 m (6,936 ft)
- Lowest elevation: 881 m (2,890 ft)
- Population (2023): 57
  - Density: 1.4/km^{2} (3.7/sq mi)
- Time zone: UTC+01:00 (CET)
  - Summer (DST): UTC+02:00 (CEST)
- INSEE/Postal code: 04016 /04200
- ^{1} French Land Register data, which excludes lakes, ponds, glaciers > 1 km^{2} (0.386 sq mi or 247 acres) and river estuaries.

Authon (French pronunciation: [otɔ̃]; Occitan: Auton) is a commune in the Alpes-de-Haute-Provence department in the Provence-Alpes-Côte d'Azur region of south-eastern France.

== Geography ==
Authon is located in the northern part of the Digne foothills, some 15 km north-east of Sisteron and 22 km north by north-west of Digne-les-Bains.

=== Geology ===
The commune is located on the eastern boundary of the Baronnies Orientales on Provençal limestone formations of the Upper Jurassic and Lower Cretaceous periods (sedimentary rocks from a former Alpine Ocean) between three main geological formations of the Alps:

- the Digne Nappe at the level of the Valavoire lobe: there is a thrust sheet or Nappe - i.e. a slab about 5000 m thick which was moved to the south-west during the Oligocene and at the end of the formation of the Alps. The lobes (or scales) correspond to the exposed edges to the west of the Nappe;
- the Durance fault to the south-west in the valley;
- the Plateau of Valensole to the south-east: a molassic basin of the Miocene and Pliocene periods composed of detritic sedimentary rocks (deposited from the erosion of the mountains which appeared in the Oligocene).

=== Topography ===
The village is located at an altitude of 1,137 metres above sea level in the Massif des Monges. The altitude varies from 881 metres (in the downstream gorges of the Vanson and the narrow valley in the west of the commune) to 2,114 metres at the top of Coste Belle along the Conaples ridge in the east. Mount Jouere is located in the north with the ridge of Clot des Martres being the northern boundary of the commune. The Planchettes ravine lies between this mountain and the Lieuron - the mountain overlooking the village.

In the south, the Col de Font-Belle, towards Le Castellard-Melan, lies between the Melan mountain and the escarpment of Géruen. Beyond this to the east are the Ravine des Barres and then the Col Saint-Antoine.

=== Relief ===
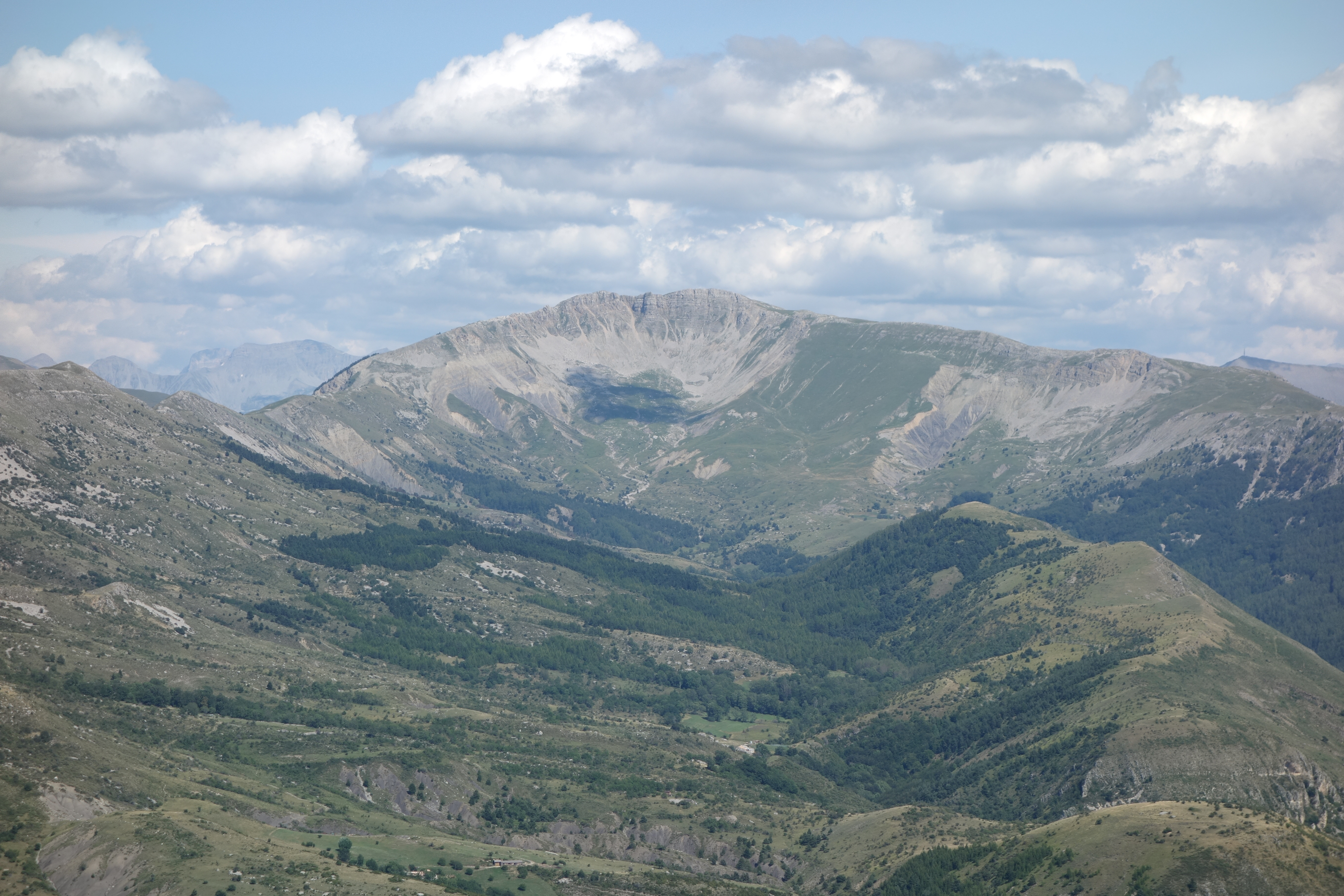
Monges summit (2,115 m), the highest point in the commune.

The commune consists of mountainous topography belonging to the Massif des Monges. The mountains and their ridges alternate with ravines and mountain passes.

=== Hydrography ===
Several rivers flow through the commune. Authon is traversed by the river Vançon which rises at Feissal, in the north of the commune at 1900 m altitude. Several streams flow into the Vançon: the Riou d'Authon, the Ravin de la Bastié, and the Verdachon. There is also an enclosed spring north-west of the village.

=== Land use ===
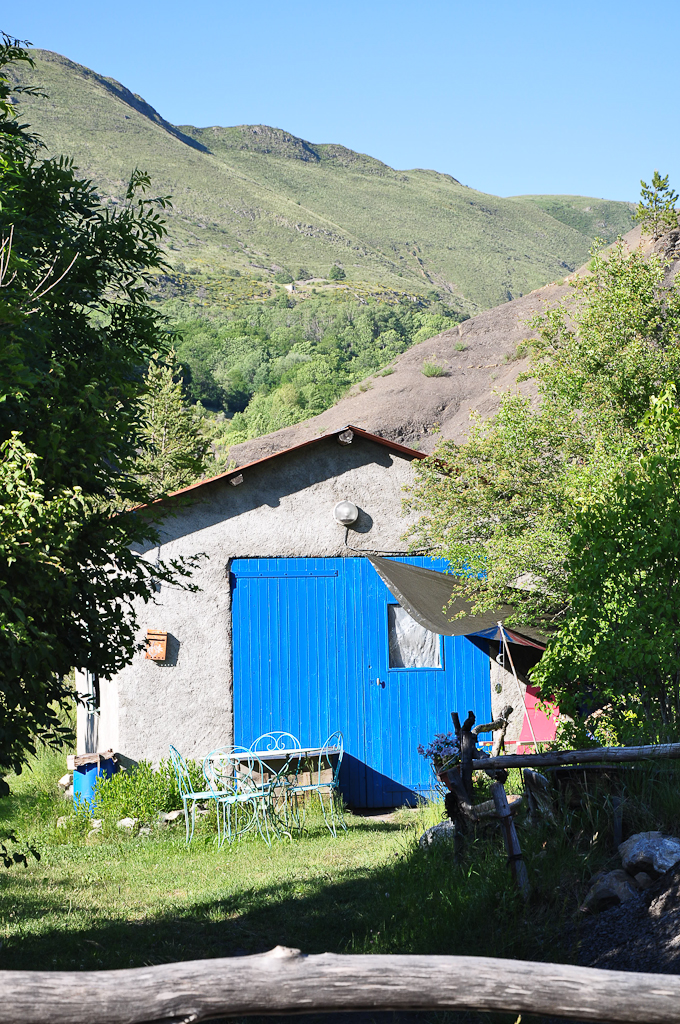
A Farm shed

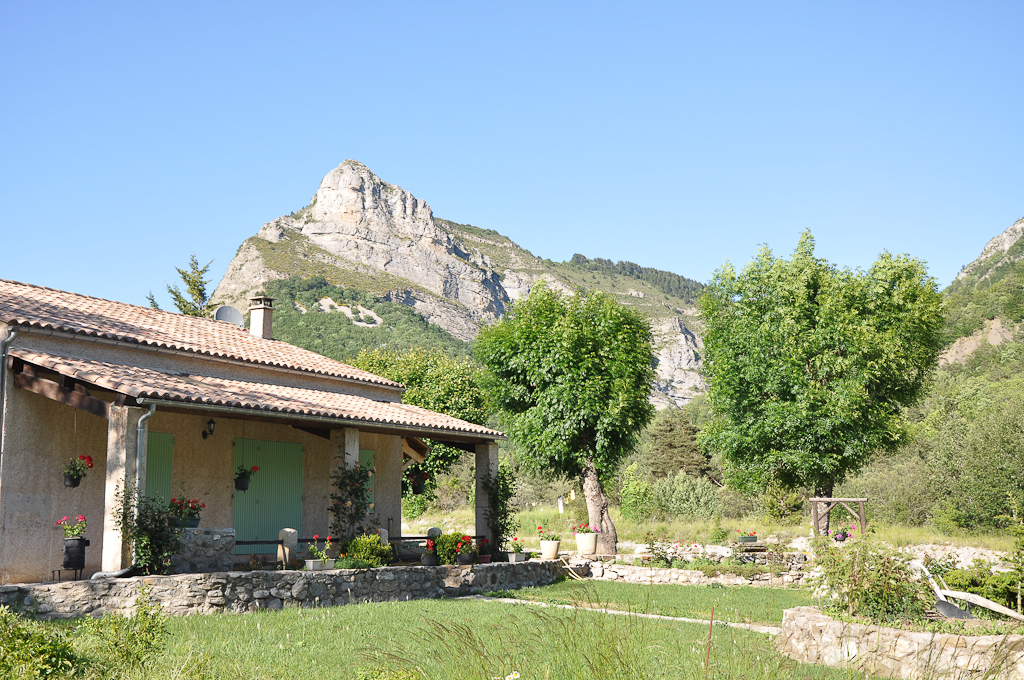
A cottage

The town has 800 hectares of woods and forests.

Human occupation is dispersed across the commune in tiny hamlets, mostly in the western part: Les Fabres, le Vivier, Briançon, Bonnet, Lèbre, Théous, Champdolent. Feissal (location of the village in a former commune) and Bastide Blanche are located in the east. There is also a jas (Note: A building of unmortared stone characteristic of Provence) in this part, at a little over 1,800 metres: the jas Monges.

The Vanson Forest is found in the north, south, and east.

=== Transport ===
The A51 autoroute passes to the west more than 10 kilometres from the commune in the Durance valley. It goes north towards Gap and south to Aix-en-Provence. Access to the commune is by road D3 from Sisteron in the west via a tortuous route to the south of the commune and the village then continues south to Barras. Hiking is available on the GR 6 hiking trail which passes through the commune.

The nearest railway station is located in Sisteron and is served by TER (Marseille-Briancon). There is also a bus station in Sisteron.

The Sisteron-Theze Aeredrome is located 15 kilometres north-west of the commune at Vaumeilh.

=== Natural and technological hazards ===
None of the 200 communes of the department is in a no seismic risk zone. The canton of Sisteron to which Authon belongs is zone 1b (low risk) according to the deterministic classification of 1991 based on the historical seismicity, and zone 4 (medium risk) according to the probabilistic classification EC8 in 2011. Authon also faces three other natural hazards:

- forest fire,
- flood (the Vanson and tributaries)
- landslide: the town has an average to high hazard on some slopes.

Authon is not exposed to any risk of technological origin identified by the prefecture.

There is no risk prevention plan for foreseeable natural risks (PPR) nor is one planned for the commune and there is no DICRIM.

=== Climate ===
The nearest weather stations to Authon are located at Thoard, Beaujeu, Sisteron, and Turriers.

== Toponymy ==
The area appears for the first time in texts of 1237 (de Autono). According to Charles Rostaing the name designates a height (from the Latin altus meaning "high" and the Gallic dunam). Bénédicte Fénié has a slightly different explanation using as a base *Al-t- and he also saw an oronym in Authon. According to Ernest Nègre the name came from the Germanic proper name Alto.

The name Briançon is reported in 1190 and Feissal is reported in 1113.

The name Saint-Michel, near Briançon, is perhaps the name of the community church.

== History ==
At Feissal there was a priory of the Abbey of Saint Victor, Marseille which was first mentioned in 1113.

The churches and communities of Authon and Briançon depended on the Order of the Temple in the 13th century who also received the related income. After the dissolution of the Order they moved to dependence on the Commandery of Claret of the Order of St. John of Jerusalem. Among the fiefs covering these communities there was also Dromon. Rigaut de Montomat seized the castle on 4 November 1392 and established a substantial toll for passage to Maupas. He also ransomed the surroundings until the Viguerie of Sisteron raised an army equipped with artillery and put siege to the castle. In February Rigaut de Montomat abandoned the castle for 800 florins and a promise to set fire to it, a promise he kept. The Briançon community, which consisted of 42 fires in 1315, was depopulated by the crises of the 14th century (the Black Death and the Hundred Years War) and was annexed by Authon in the 15th century. At the end of the Middle Ages a Fair was held in Authon as it was located on one of the routes between the Sisteron bridge on the Durance and the Bléone valley.

In the 12th century there was a lawsuit opposing the hospitallier commander of the village over an honorable ceremony (it brought honour to the peasants who were invited): the villagers brought wood at Christmas and the commander shared the family nectar (a superior quality drink), fine pastries, and grapes with their leaders. He wanted to move the ceremony to a variable date and replace the nectar with good wine.

At the beginning of the French Revolution the news of the storming of the Bastille was welcomed but caused collective fear of an aristocratic reaction. Locally the Great Fear came from Tallard and was part of the flow of "Macon Fear", reaching the area of La Motte on the evening of 31 July 1789. The consuls of the village community were warned that a troop of 5-6,000 brigands were moving towards Haute-Provence after having looted the Dauphiné. The communities of La Motte, Clamensane, Saint-Geniez, Authon, Curbans, Bayons, and Claret together constituted a group of 700 armed men. They put the Marquis d'Hugues de Beaujeu at its head who decided to meet the danger by monitoring the ferries on the Durance.

On 2 August the panic settled and the news which was originally rumours were clarified. An important change took place however: the communities were armed and organized to defend themselves and their neighbours. A sense of solidarity was born within the communities and between neighbouring communities and the consuls decided to maintain the National Guard. As soon as the fear subsided, however, the authorities recommended disarming the workers and the landless peasants and to keep only property owners in the National Guard.

Between 1820 and 1874, four mills were built "suddenly" at Authon (flour, nut oil) in a rivalry with Saint-Geniez. They went bankrupt. Each 29 June until 1843, then on Trinity Sunday, there has been a pilgrimage of the faithful of the commune of Baume from Saint Vincent church to the Melan mountain (in Mélan commune). As with many communes in the department, Authon and Feissal endowed a school well before the Jules Ferry laws: in 1863 a school providing a primary education to boys already operated in both villages. No instruction was given to girls: the Falloux Act (1851), which required the opening of a girls' school in communes with more than 800 inhabitants, and the first Duruy law (1867), which lowered the threshold to 500 inhabitants, did not concern Authon or Feissal. It was only with the Ferry laws that the girls in the two communes were educated.

The town suffered a major rural exodus. Authon lost population in 1793, earlier than elsewhere in the department (where the rural exodus began in the 1850s).

Some men called to the front to die during the First World War. The commune of Feissal (97 inhabitants in 1765) merged with Authon in 1936.

During World War II the department was occupied by Italy from 1942-1943 and then by Nazi Germany until August 1944. At that time the nearby town of Sisteron was bombed by the allies during the landings in Provence. Liberation came quickly after the landings and the commune became part of the liberated zone on 20 August.

Unlike the departmental trend, population loss continued long after the war until 1982 when the town, had only 21 inhabitants. Population growth began at the end of the 20th century. Population reduced by 90% since 1793 with a population of only 40 in the 2000s.

=== Heraldry ===
Arms of Authon	The Authon arms carry a Maltese cross because the lord was part of the Order of St. John of Jerusalem and was within the Commandery of Gap. Blazon: Azure, a Maltese cross in Argent bordure in Or.

== Politics and Administration ==
=== Municipal administration ===
Based on its size the town has a council of 9 members (Article L2121-2 of the General Local Authorities Code). During the 2014 elections there was only one round and Alain Rahon was elected councilor with 56 total votes, or 94.91% of the vote. The turnout was 92.19%. He was then appointed mayor by the council

=== Judicial and administrative proceedings ===
Authon is one of fifteen communes in the Canton of Sisteron. The canton was in the Arrondissement of Sisteron from 17 February 1800 to 10 September 1926 when it was moved to the Arrondissement of Forcalquier and to the Alpes de Haute Provence's 2nd constituency. Authon has been part of the canton of Sisteron since 1801 after having been in the Canton of Saint-Geniez from 1793 to 1801.

Authon falls within the area of the Tribunal d'instance (District court) of Digne-les-Bains the Tribunal de grande instance (High Court) of Digne-les-Bains, the Cour d'appel (Appeal court) of Aix-en-Provence, the Tribunal pour enfants (Juvenile court) of Digne-les-Bains, the Conseil de prud'hommes (Labour Court) of Digne-les-Bains, the Tribunal de commerce (Commercial Court) of Manosque, the Tribunal administratif (Administrative tribunal) of Marseille, and the Cour administrative d'appel (Administrative Court of Appeal) of Marseille

=== Taxation ===
The taxation of households and businesses in Authon in 2009
Tax	Communal part	Inter-communal part	Departmental part	Regional part
Residential Tax (TH)	4.04%	0.66%	5.53%	0.00%
Building Tax (TFPB)	5.70%	1.94%	14.49%	2.36%
Vacant Land Tax (TFPNB)	30.50%	4.07%	47.16%	8.85%
Business Tax (TP)	6.40%	1.21%	10.80%	3.84%

The Regional part of the Residential tax is not applicable.

In 2010 Business tax was replaced by the property contribution of enterprises (CFE) on the rental value of the property and the value added contribution of the business sector (CAVE) (both forming the territorial economic contribution (CET) which is a local tax introduced by the Finance Act 2010).

== Population and society ==
The inhabitants of the commune are known as Authoniers or Authonières in French.

=== Population ===
The population data in the table below refer to the commune of Authon proper, in its geography at the given years. In 1936 it absorbed the former commune Feissal.

Historical population

Year	Pop.	±% p.a.
1793	422	—
1821	373	−0.44%
1846	352	−0.23%
1872	240	−1.46%
1901	175	−1.08%
1926	77	−3.23%
1946	73	−0.27%
1962	28	−5.81%
1968	22	−3.94%

Year	Pop.	±% p.a.
1975	23	+0.64%
1982	21	−1.29%
1990	38	+7.69%
1999	33	−1.56%
2007	40	+2.43%
2012	50	+4.56%
2017	62	+4.40%
2023	57	−1.39%

Source: EHESS and INSEE (1968-2023)

After the crises of the 14th and 15th centuries and a long period of growth until the beginning of the 19th century, there was a period of "slack" where the population remained stable at a high level. This period lasted from 1806 to 1846. The rural exodus then caused long term population loss. In 1901 the town recorded the loss of more than half its population since 1800. The outwards movement of population continued until 1980. Since then the population has increased to around 60 people, 15% of its historical peak. Authon has an area of 4,016 hectares.

=== Education ===
The commune has neither a kindergarten nor a primary school. Students from the commune are assigned to the Paul Arène Scholastic City in Sisteron.

=== Health ===
The nearest hospital is at Sisteron which depends on the inter-communal hospital of the Southern Alps headquartered in Gap.

== Economy ==
=== Overview ===
In 2017, the active population amounted to 32 people, including 3 unemployed. These workers are in majority not employees (74%), and are in majority employed in the commune (65%).

At the end of 2015 businesses active in the commune were mainly farms (8 out of 19) and services (6).

=== Agriculture ===
At the end of 2015 the primary sector (agriculture, forestry, fisheries) had 8 businesses under the INSEE definition and 10 according to the Agreste Department of Agriculture survey. The farms are sheep and polyculture farms. The utilized agricultural area (UAA) has almost doubled in ten years from 572 to 1,056 hectares with almost all of the area being devoted to livestock.

Authon is included in the boundaries of an Appellation d'origine contrôlée (AOC) Designation for Lavender oil (Huile essentielle de lavande de Haute-Provence) and nine Geographically Protected Indications (IGP):.

- Pommes des Alpes de Haute-Durance (Apples of Alpes de Haute-Durance)
- Miel de Provence (Honey of Provence)
- Agneau de Sisteron (Sisteron Lamb)
- Alpes-de-Haute-Provence (VDP) blanc, rouge, and rosé
- VDP de Méditerranée blanc, rouge, and rosé

=== Lavender ===
Lavender has been harvested for centuries in the wild until cropping was organized in the 16th century along with the distillation of its flowers. Its golden age was at the beginning of the 20th century although it was during the 1920s that there was a real fever for planting. After the crisis of 1929 and the Second World War the market saw renewed demand from 1955 only to go into crisis five years later. Mechanization of harvesting, better organization of the market, and obtaining an AOC for "Lavender essential oil from Haute-Provence" in 1981 should have boosted production. Production fell however from approximately 200 tonnes in the early 1980s to 25 tonnes in 1990 then finally increased to 80 tons in 2003.

=== Sisteron lamb ===
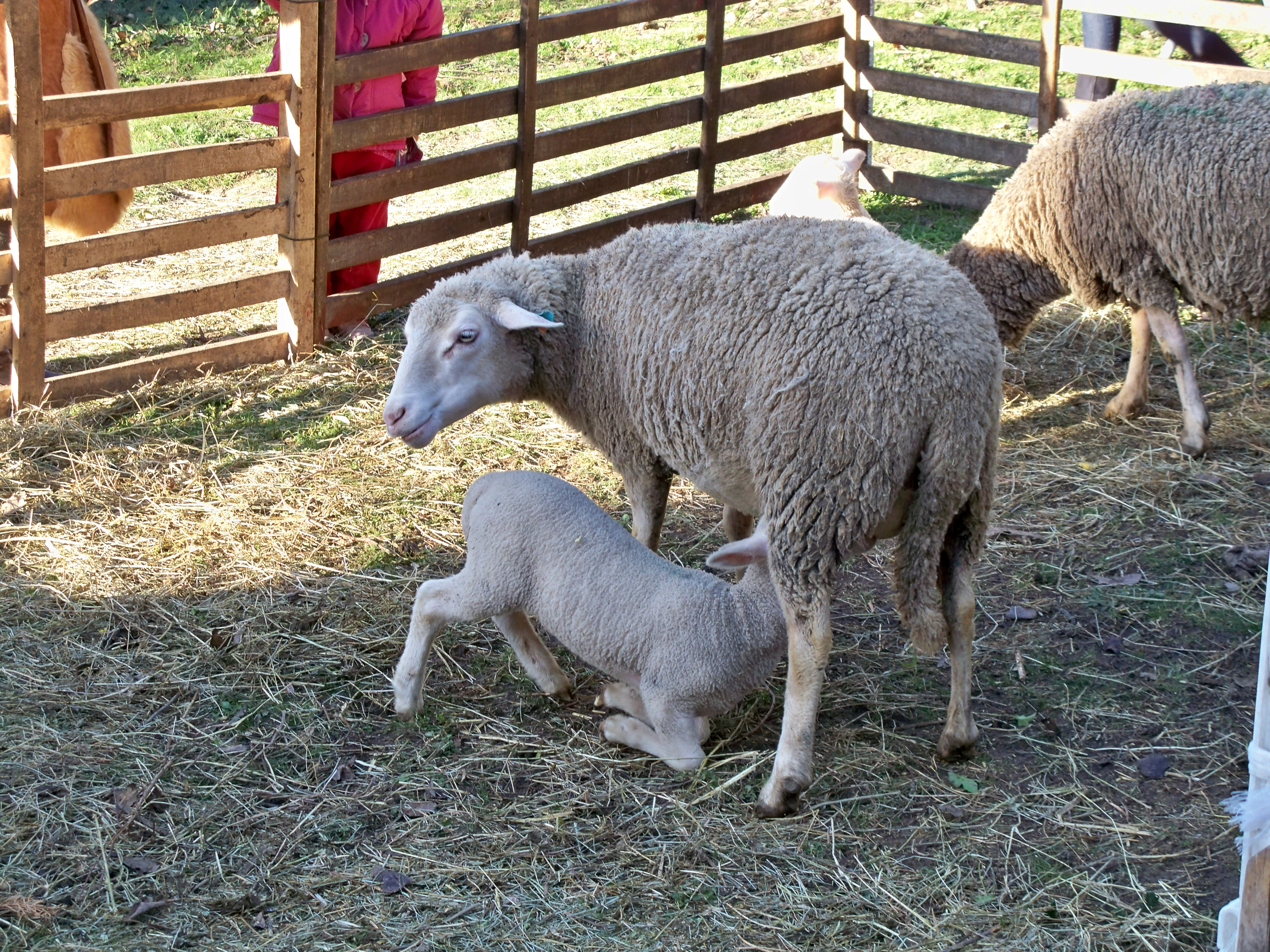
A Sisteron lamb with its mother

Sisteron lamb is a lamb raised by its mother in the Alps or Drôme of Provence for a minimum 60 days with an age between 70 and 150 days and weighing 13 to 19 kg. It comes from traditional farms with Merino, Mourerous, or Prealpes du Sud mothers who breastfeed for at least two months on a pastoral area with less than 10 sheep per hectare and with a minimum of 10 hectares in area. Lambs who meet these criteria can be sold under the control of the INAO with the red Sisteron lamb label granted by a governmental decree dated 3 January 2005.

These quality requirements put an end to the practice of flocks being reared in the same conditions but from other regions. Each year nearly 400,000 animals used to pass through the slaughterhouses of Sisteron enjoying a certain laxity sought to usurp their provenance.

=== Apples of Alpes de Haute-Durance ===
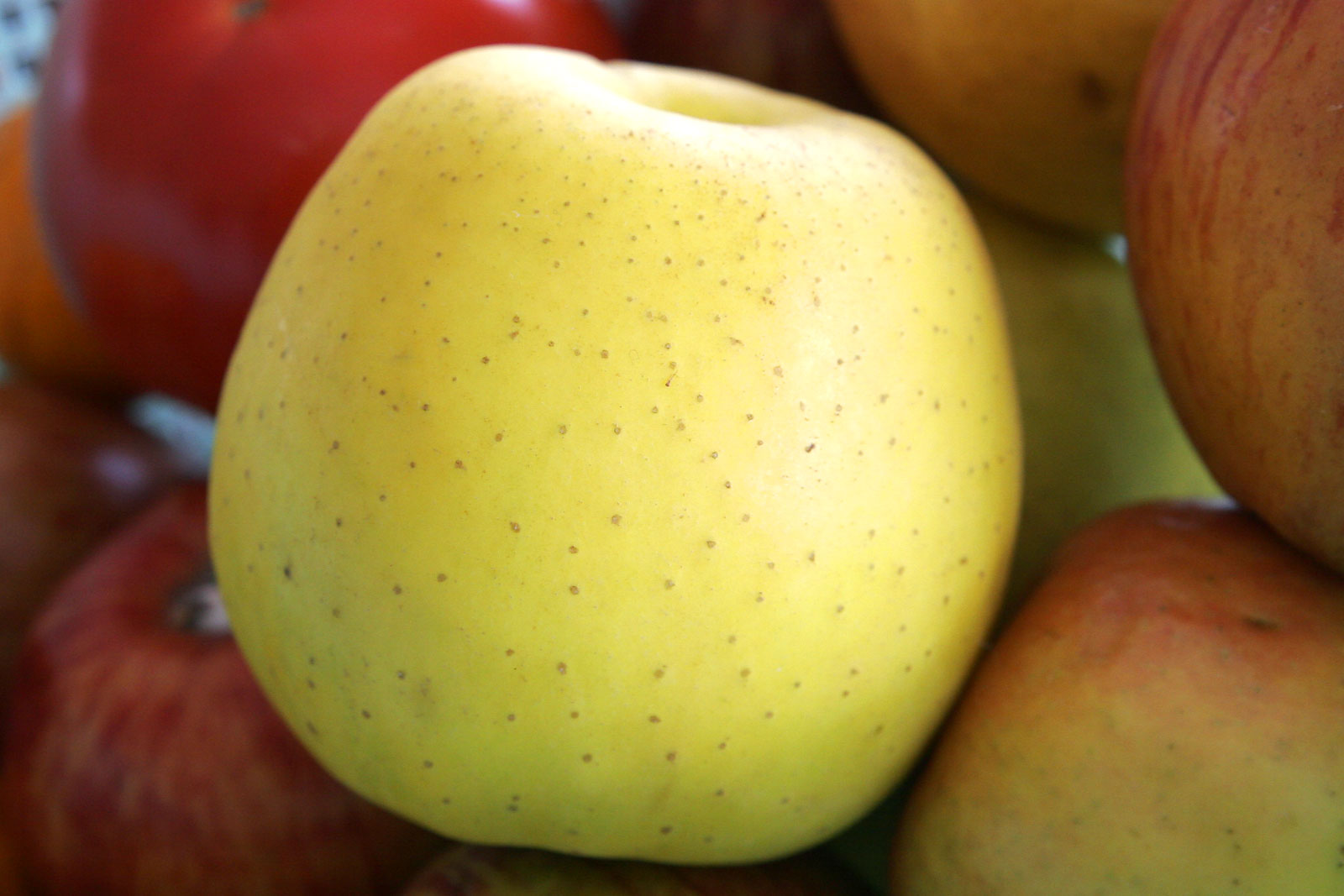
Golden delicious apple

Apples from Alpes de Haute-Durance received a Protected Geographical Indication which was published in the Official Journal of the European Union on 17 April 2010.

The IGP covers the apple varieties Golden Delicious and Gala from six cantons in Alpes-de-Haute-Provence and thirteen cantons in Hautes-Alpes located between 450 metres and 900 metres above sea level. The quality of these apples is linked to their soil and, in particular, the climate of Haute-Durance with over 300 days of sunshine per year. The prevailing cold nights during the maturation of apples prevents the degradation of acids while a strong diurnal temperature range allows them to yellow and even become pink.

=== Honey of Provence ===
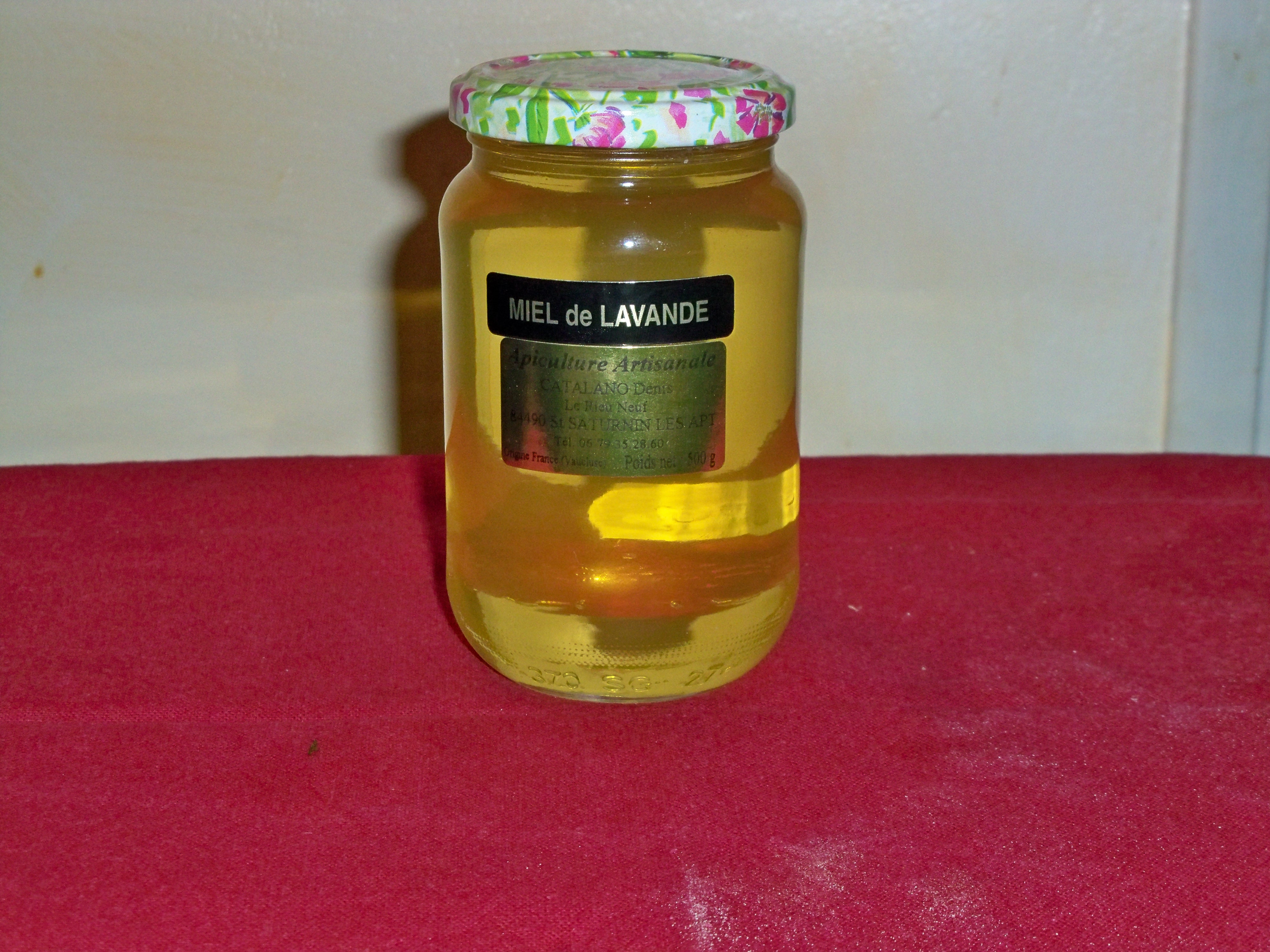
Lavender honey

Honey from Provence is protected by a red label associated with a protected geographical indication for honey from all flowers as well as for honey from lavender and lavandin. There are a number of Beekeepers estimated at about 4,500 of which 700 have between 70 and 150 hives. Regional production is around 2,000 tonnes/year or 8% of the production of France Many practice transhumance along a path from the coast to Haute-Provence. Summer is the prime season for lavender honey and beehives are located in an area bounded in the north by a line from Montelimar to Digne and in the south Mont Ventoux, the Plateau d'Albion, Lure mountain, the Vaucluse Mountains, and Luberon. Honey from other flowers is produced in a wide area bounded by Nîmes, Montélimar, Gap, Digne-les-Bains, Nice, Toulon, Marseille, and Avignon.

=== Service activities ===
At the end of 2010 the tertiary sector (trades and services) had 6 businesses (no employees) plus three administrative entities employing one person.

According to the Departmental Observatory of tourism, tourism is very important for the commune with more than 5 tourists per resident per year. Nevertheless accommodation is rare in the commune since one small cottage is the only collective accommodation accessible to tourists: there is no hotel nor camping nor furnished accommodation, nor cottages.

Second homes provide more capacity with 29 secondary residences out of 63 housing units (46%).

== Sites and Monuments ==
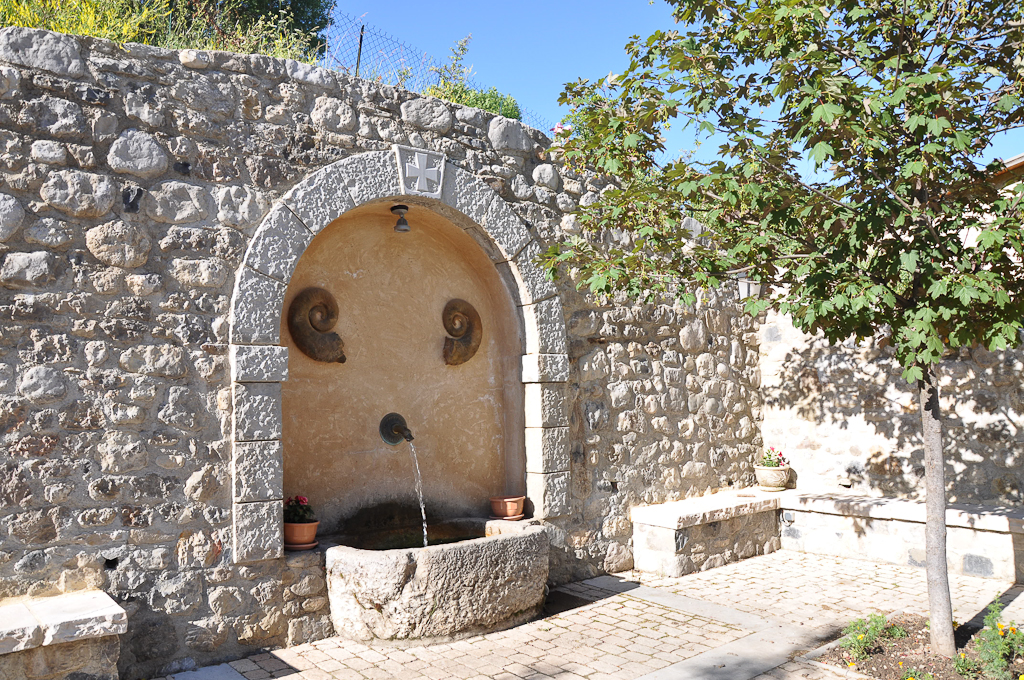
Fountain at Authon

Near the Calade passage of Malpas between Authon and Saint-Geniez there is an engraved stone, dated 1849, depicting a devil or demon, smiling and with feline features like the Matagot des Hautes-Alpes.

There are remains of a castle destroyed in 1393 in the hamlet of Briançon.

The Sainte-Marie-Madeleine church in the village is a simple rectangular shape and capped in timber except for the choir which is surmounted by a bower of slats. It is considered to be "without style" by Raymond Collier. Its walls are deformed.

There is also the Church of Notre-Dame (formerly Sainte-Marie-Madeleine) at Feissal.

The Sainte-Marthe Chapel was completely rebuilt on its remains in 2007.

== See also ==
- Communes of the Alpes-de-Haute-Provence department

=== Bibliography ===
- Irène Magnaudeix, Fixed rocks, Moving rocks: Usage and representations in stone by the inhabitants of Haut-Vançon, Mane, Les Alpes de Lumière, Forcalquier, 2004. ISBN 2-906162-73-6 (in French)
- Élie Marcel Gaillard, "The nectar of Authon: a curious proceeding from the 17th century", in Chronicles of Haute-Provence, No. 357 (autumn 2006), p. 82-89 (in French)
- Raymond Collier, Haute-Provence monumental and artistic, Digne, Imprimerie Louis Jean, 1986, 559 p. (in French)
- Under the direction of Édouard Baratier, Georges Duby, and Ernest Hildesheimer, Historical Atlas of Provence, County of Venaissin, Principality of Orange, County of Nice, Principality of Monaco, Librairie Armand Colin, Paris, 1969 (in French)
- Mount Ventoux. Encyclopedia of a provençal mountain, Guy Barruol, Nerte Dautier, and Bernard Mondon (coord.)

=== External links ===
- Authon on Géoportail, National Geographic Institute (IGN) website (in French)
- Authon on the 1750 Cassini Map
