= Jabron =

Jabron may refer to:

== Places ==
- Montboucher-sur-Jabron, a commune in the Drôme department in southeastern France
- Noyers-sur-Jabron, a commune in the Alpes-de-Haute-Provence department in southeastern France
- Saint-Vincent-sur-Jabron, a commune in the Alpes-de-Haute-Provence department in southeastern France
