= Curel =

Curel may refer to the following places in France:

- Curel, Alpes-de-Haute-Provence, a commune in the Alpes-de-Haute-Provence department
- Curel, Haute-Marne, a commune in the Haute-Marne department

== See also ==
- François, Vicomte de Curel, French dramatist
- Curél, a skincare brand of Kao Corporation
