= Sisteron =

- Commune
- Sisteron in 2026

- Coat of arms
- Location of Sisteron
- Location within France Location within Provence-Alpes-Côte d'Azur
- Coordinates: 44°11′28″N 5°56′50″E
- Country: France
- Region: Provence-Alpes-Côte d'Azur
- Department: Alpes-de-Haute-Provence
- Arrondissement: Forcalquier
- Canton: Sisteron
- Intercommunality: Sisteronais Buëch

Government
  - Mayor (2026–32): Jean-Pierre Templier
- Area^{1}: 50.25 km^{2} (19.40 sq mi)
- Elevation: 485 m (1,591 ft)
- Highest elevation: 1,145 m (3,757 ft)
- Lowest elevation: 448 m (1,470 ft)
- Population (2023): 7,850
  - Density: 156/km^{2} (405/sq mi)
- Time zone: UTC+01:00 (CET)
  - Summer (DST): UTC+02:00 (CEST)
- INSEE/Postal code: 04209 /04200
- ^{1} French Land Register data, which excludes lakes, ponds, glaciers > 1 km^{2} (0.386 sq mi or 247 acres) and river estuaries.

Sisteron (French pronunciation: [sistəʁɔ̃]; Occitan: [sisˈtɛru(n)], Mistralian norm: Sisteroun; from Old Occitan: Sestaron) is a commune in the Alpes-de-Haute-Provence department, Provence-Alpes-Côte d'Azur, southeastern France.

Sisteron is situated on the banks of the river Durance just after the confluence of the rivers Buëch and Sasse. It is sometimes called the "Gateway to Provence" because it is in a narrow gap between two long mountain ridges. Despite its relatively small population, it serves as a long-distance navigation reference point, routinely signed as far away as Grenoble.

It is 135 km (84 mi) from Marseille, also 135 km (84 mi) from Grenoble, 180 km (110 mi) from Nice and 40 km (25 mi) from Forcalquier.

There are 1,573 hectares (3,890 acres) of forest and wood within the commune.

== History ==
Map of the town and citadel of Sisteron (c. 1752)

Sisteron has been inhabited for 4,000 years. The Romans used the route through Sisteron as can be shown by a Latin inscription in the rocks near the road to Authon. It escaped the barbarian invasions after the fall of Rome, but was ravaged by the Saracens. It was first fortified by the Counts of Forcalquier in the 11th century and later was the northern boundary of the domain of the Counts of Provence. In 1483 during the reign of Louis XI, Sisteron re-joined the kingdom of France. Around this time there were seven plagues that killed two thirds of the population. Between 1562 and 1594 the town and its citadel was fought over by Protestants and Catholics including two sieges. During this time the walls of the town were built. The plague returned in 1630, and typhus in 1744, killing many of the town's population.

During the French Revolution the town remained Royalist. Consequently, when Napoleon arrived on his march north after his escape from Elba in 1815, the town ignored him and let him through.

On 15 August 1944 French Martin B-26 Marauder bombers and American Boeing B-17 Flying Fortresses of the 42nd Bomber Wing tried to destroy the railway bridge and the road bridge which span the Durance. The weather was unfavorable and the bridges were not destroyed. A bomber during a manoeuvre to avoid a collision accidentally dropped several bombs on the town, including a full church, causing about 100 fatalities and seriously damaging the citadel. On 17 August the French aircraft returned and destroyed the bridges.

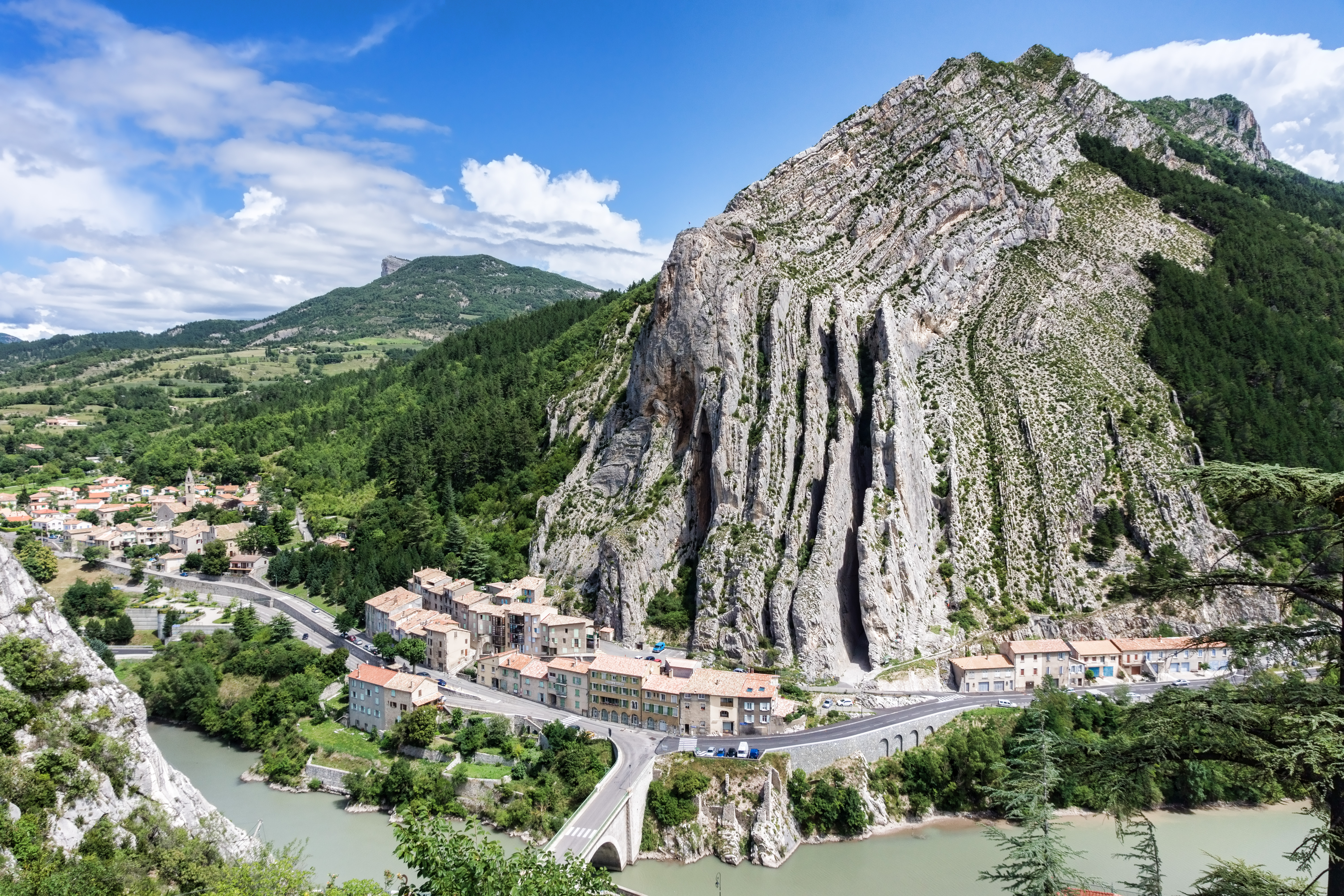
Rocher de la Baume

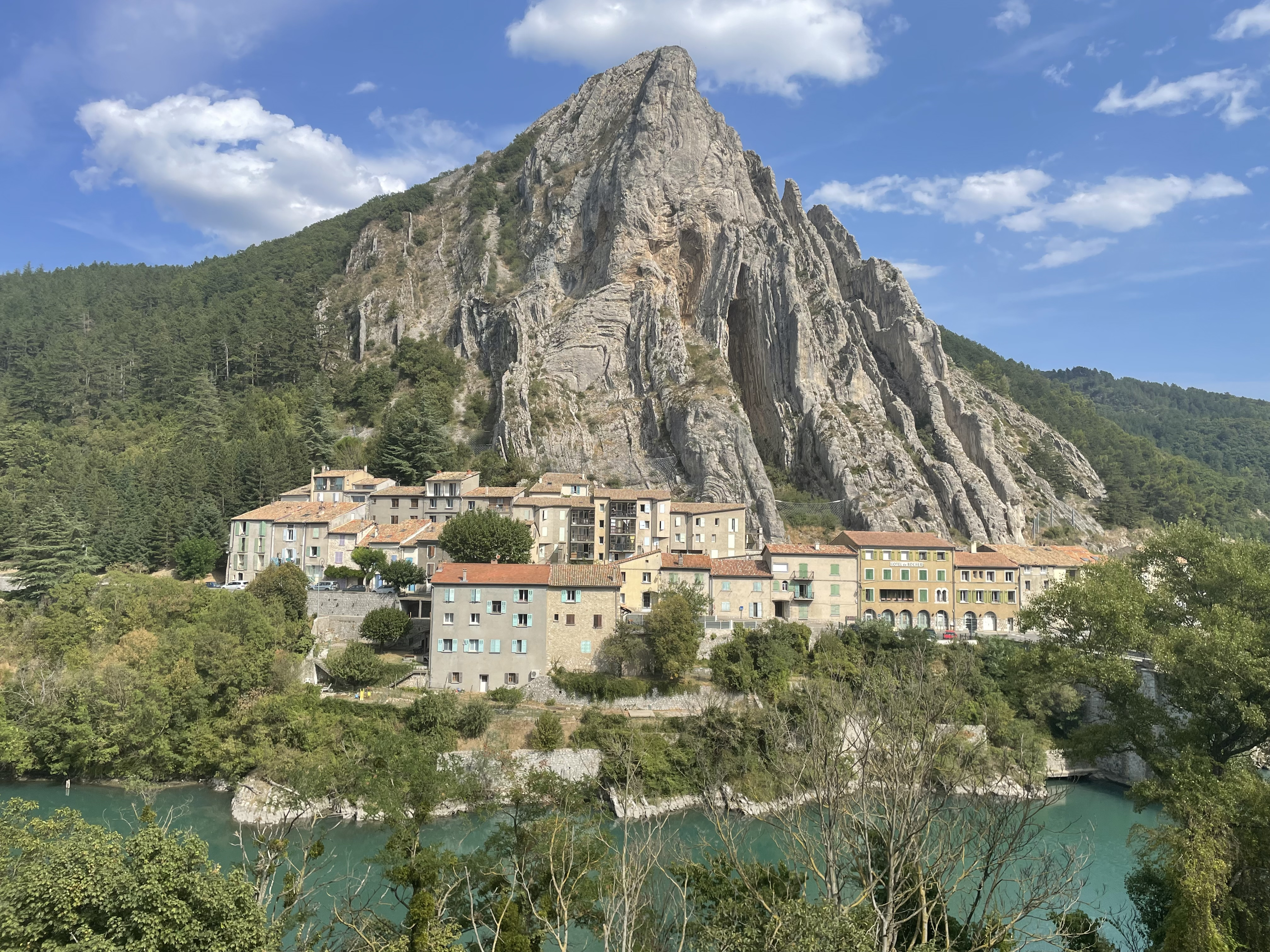
Rocher de la Baume

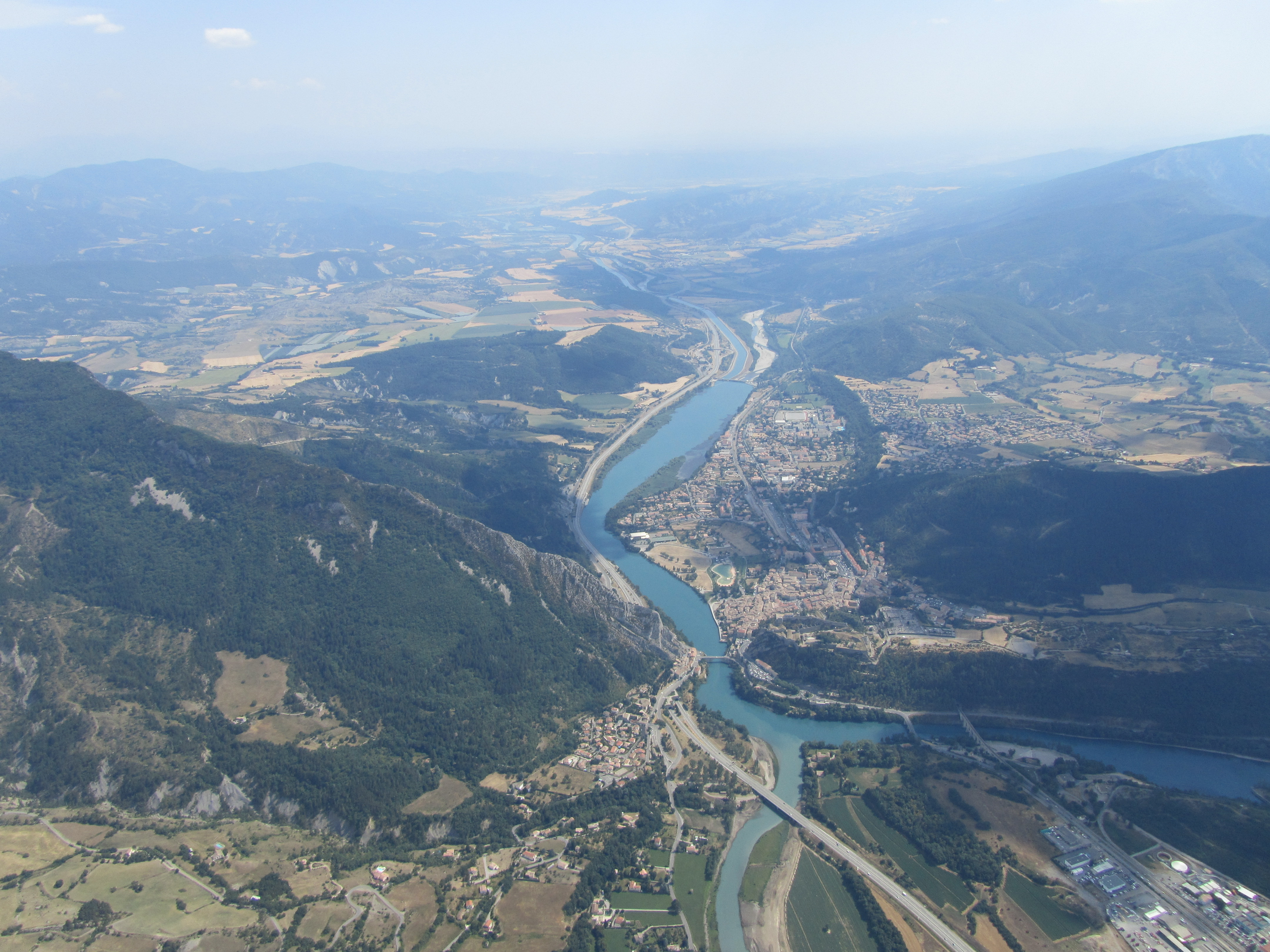
Sisteron from the air

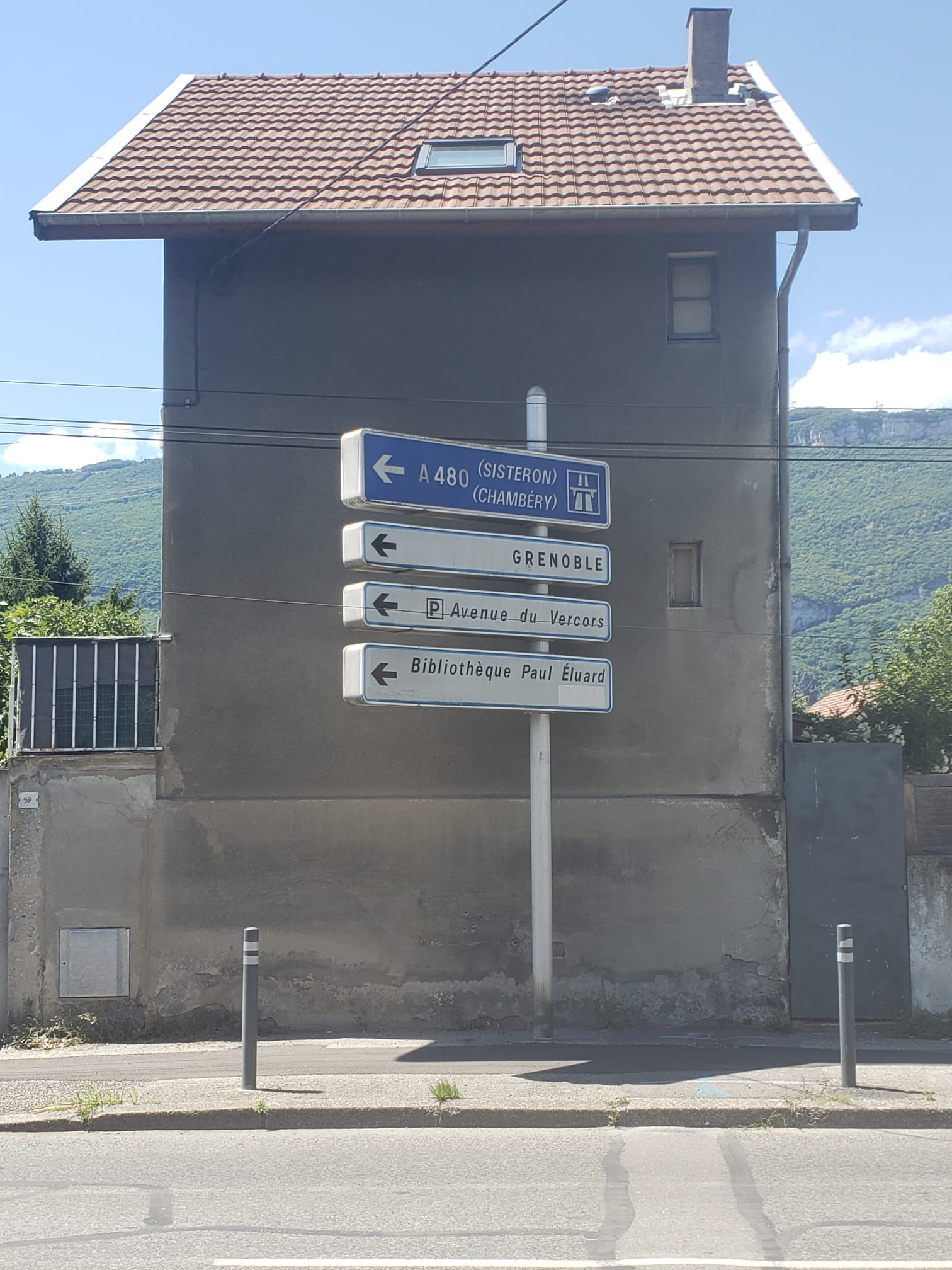
Road sign in the Grenoble urban area indicating the direction to Sisteron (142 km away)

== Sights ==
The town's buildings include the citadel and the 12th century former Sisteron Cathedral dedicated to the Blessed Virgin Mary and Saint Thyrsus (Cathédrale Notre Dame des Pommiers et Saint Thyrse). There are three museums of note: the Citadel Museum, the Baden-Powell Scout Museum and Musée Terre & Temps (about the earth and the measurement of time).

Tourist attractions include the countryside, rock climbing, the lido and the airfields at Vaumeilh, La Motte-du-Caire and Château-Arnoux-Saint-Auban, which are dedicated to the sport of gliding. There is an annual festival with many events throughout the summer months. There is a market every Wednesday and Saturday. A long-distance walk, the GR 6 (Grande Randonnée) passes east–west through Sisteron.

== Transport ==
Sisteron is served by the A51 autoroute, which now by-passes the town, eliminating it as a notorious 'bottle-neck' for traffic. There is also a railway station on the line from Marseille to Briançon and Grenoble.

== Personalities born in Sisteron ==
- Jean-Baptiste d'Ornano (1581-1626), illustrious French nobleman, governor of Gaston, Duke of Orléans and instigator of the Chalais conspiracy.
- Paul Arène (1843–1896), poet.
- Louis Antoine Jullien (1812–1860), popular music conductor and composer of light music.

== International relations ==
Sisteron is twinned with:

- Fidenza, Italy
- Herbolzheim, Germany
- Oliva, Spain
- Nyingtri, Tibet, China

== Population ==
Historical population

Year	Pop.	±% p.a.
1793	4,000	—
1800	3,891	−0.39%
1806	3,642	−1.10%
1821	4,125	+0.83%
1831	4,429	+0.71%
1836	4,546	+0.52%
1841	3,844	−3.30%
1846	4,392	+2.70%
1851	4,576	+0.82%
1856	4,509	−0.29%
1861	4,338	−0.77%
1866	4,210	−0.60%
1872	4,575	+1.40%
1876	4,280	−1.65%
1881	3,974	−1.47%
1886	3,864	−0.56%
1891	3,996	+0.67%
1896	3,905	−0.46%
1901	3,874	−0.16%

Year	Pop.	±% p.a.
1906	3,702	−0.90%
1911	3,575	−0.70%
1921	3,341	−0.67%
1926	3,354	+0.08%
1931	3,302	−0.31%
1936	3,378	+0.46%
1946	3,432	+0.16%
1954	4,070	+2.15%
1962	5,325	+3.42%
1968	6,289	+2.81%
1975	7,243	+2.04%
1982	6,470	−1.60%
1990	6,594	+0.24%
1999	6,964	+0.61%
2007	7,288	+0.57%
2012	7,360	+0.20%
2017	7,460	+0.27%
2023	7,850	+0.85%

Source: EHESS and INSEE (1968-2023)

== In popular culture ==
The town was featured in the 2014 racing game Forza Horizon 2 and the 2022 series The 7 Lives of Lea.

== See also ==
- Route Napoléon
- Communes of the Alpes-de-Haute-Provence department
- List of works by Louis Botinelly
