= Cobblestone =

Natural stones for surfacing roads and buildings

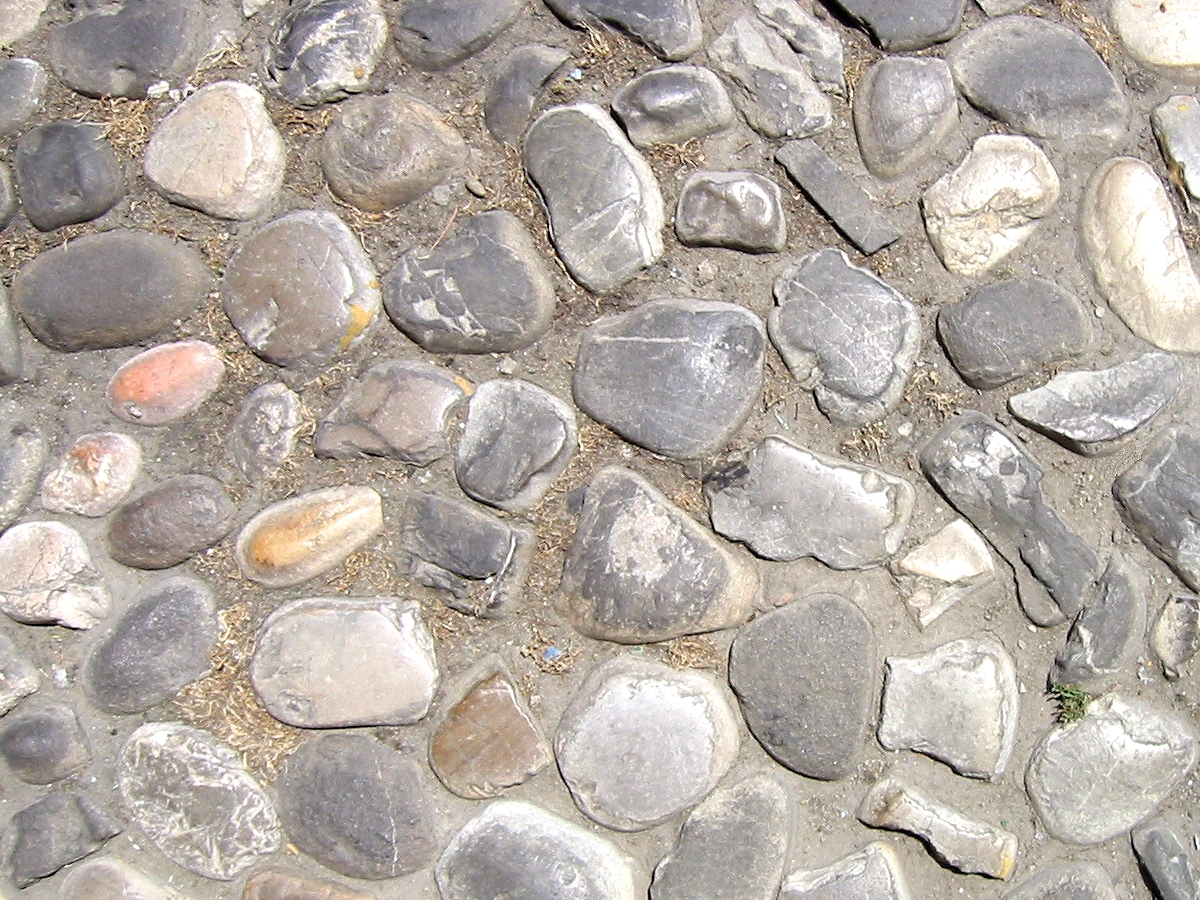
Cobblestones on a road surface in Imola, Italy

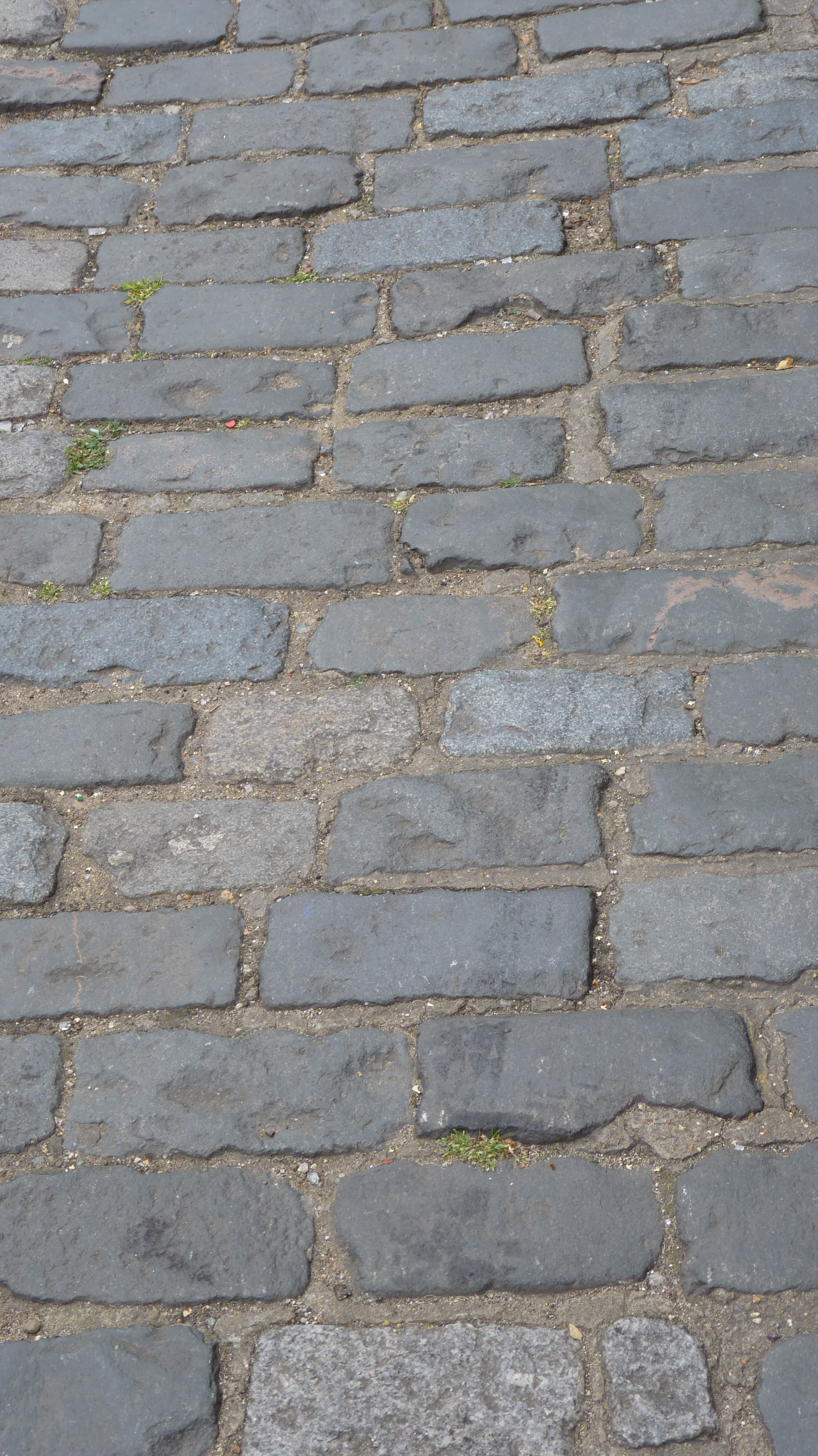
Sett-paving, such as this surface in Fulham, south-west London, is also often referred to as "cobblestones".

Cobblestone is a natural building material based on cobble-sized stones, and is used for pavement roads, streets, and buildings. Setts, also called Belgian blocks, are often referred to as "cobbles", although a sett is distinct from a cobblestone by being quarried and shaped into a regular form, while cobblestones are naturally occurring rounded forms less uniform in size.

It has been used across various cultures for millennia, particularly in Europe, and became especially prominent during the medieval and early modern periods. Today, cobblestone streets are often associated with historic preservation and are used in many cities to maintain the historical character of certain neighborhoods.

== History as road surface ==
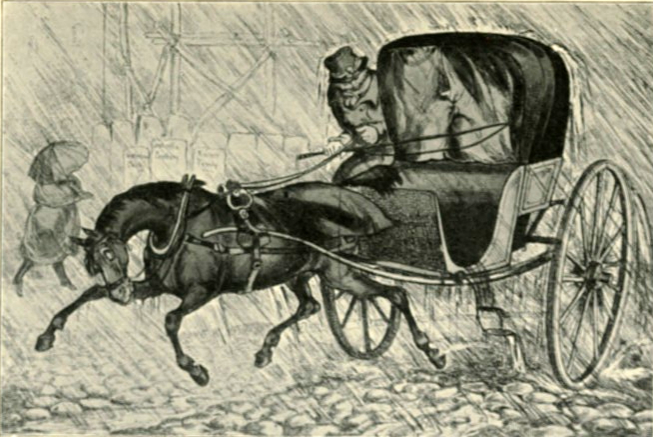
A cabriolet on wet, slippery London cobblestones in 1823

During the medieval period, cobblestone streets became common in many European towns and cities. Cobblestones were readily available, as they were often naturally occurring stones found in riverbeds and fields. Their rounded shape made them easy to lay, and their durability was well-suited to the needs of growing urban centers. Cobblestones are typically either set in sand or similar material, or are bound together with mortar. Paving with cobblestones allows a road to be heavily used all year long. It prevents the build-up of ruts often found in dirt roads. It has the additional advantage of immediately draining water, and not getting muddy in wet weather or dusty in dry weather. Shod horses are also able to get better traction on stone cobbles, pitches or setts than tarmac or asphalt. Cobblestones set in sand have the environmental advantage of being permeable paving, and of moving rather than cracking with movements in the ground. The fact that carriage wheels, horse hooves and even modern automobiles make a lot of noise when rolling over cobblestone paving might be thought a disadvantage, but it has the advantage of warning pedestrians of their approach. In England, the custom was to strew straw over the cobbles outside the house of a sick or dying person to damp the sound. In rural areas, cobblestones were sometimes used to pave important roads, particularly those leading to and from major cities.

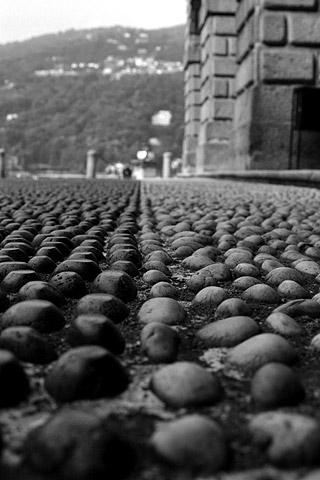
Italian cobblestone-covered street in Isolabella. Cobblestones such as these are designed for horses to get a good grip.

In England, it has been commonplace since ancient times for flat stones with a flat narrow edge to be set on edge to provide an even paved surface. This was known as a 'pitched' surface and was common all over Britain, as it did not require rounded pebbles. Pitched surfaces predate the use of regularly-sized granite setts by more than a thousand years. Such pitched paving is quite distinct from that formed from rounded stones, although both forms are commonly referred to as 'cobbled' surfaces. Most surviving genuinely old 'cobbled' areas are in reality pitched surfaces. A cobbled area is known as a "causey", "cassay" or "cassie" in Scots (probably from causeway). In the early modern period, cities like Paris, London, and Amsterdam began to pave their streets with cobblestones to manage the increased traffic from carts, carriages, and pedestrians.

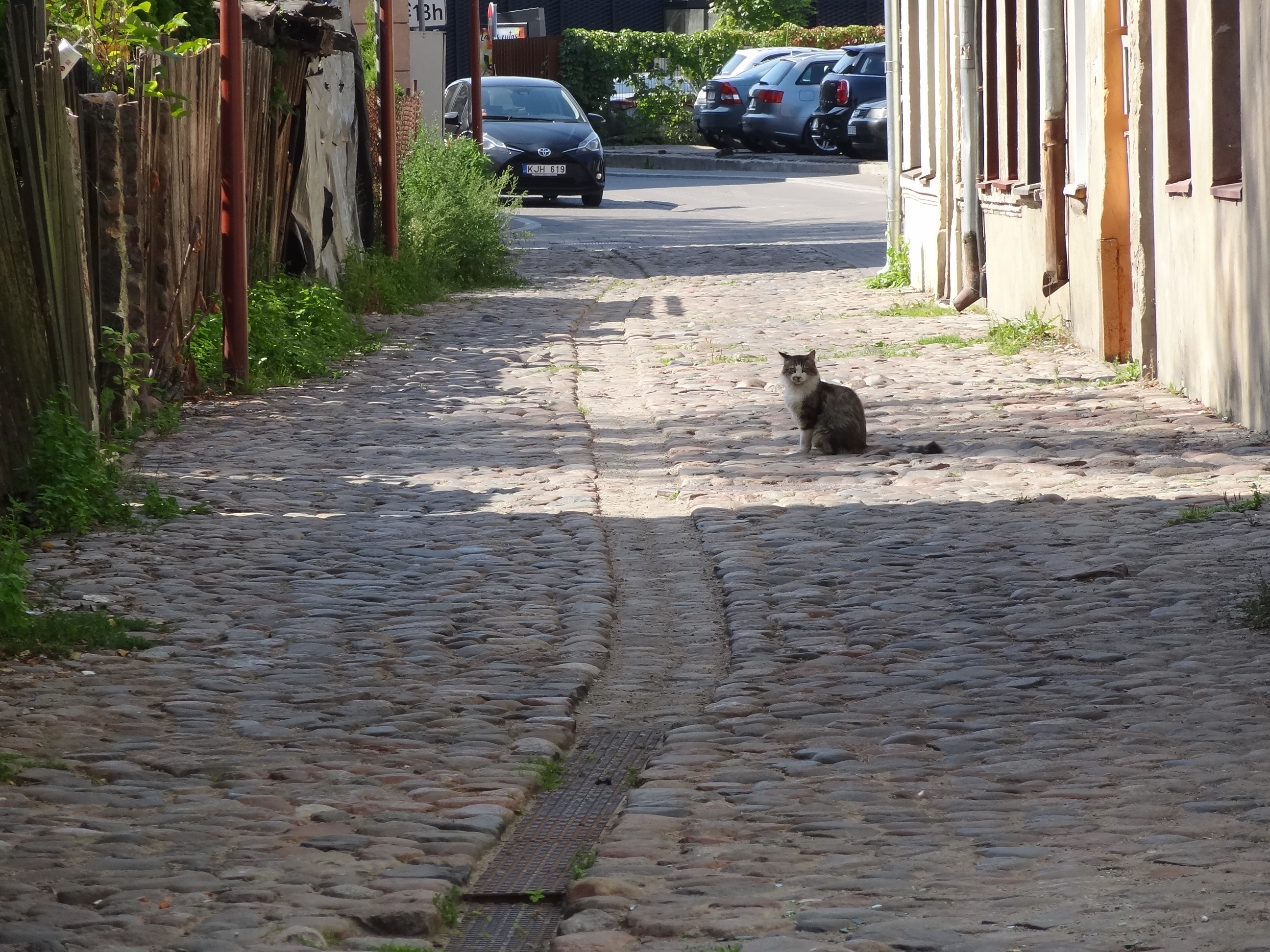
A cobblestone lane in the Old Town (Senamiestis) in Kaunas

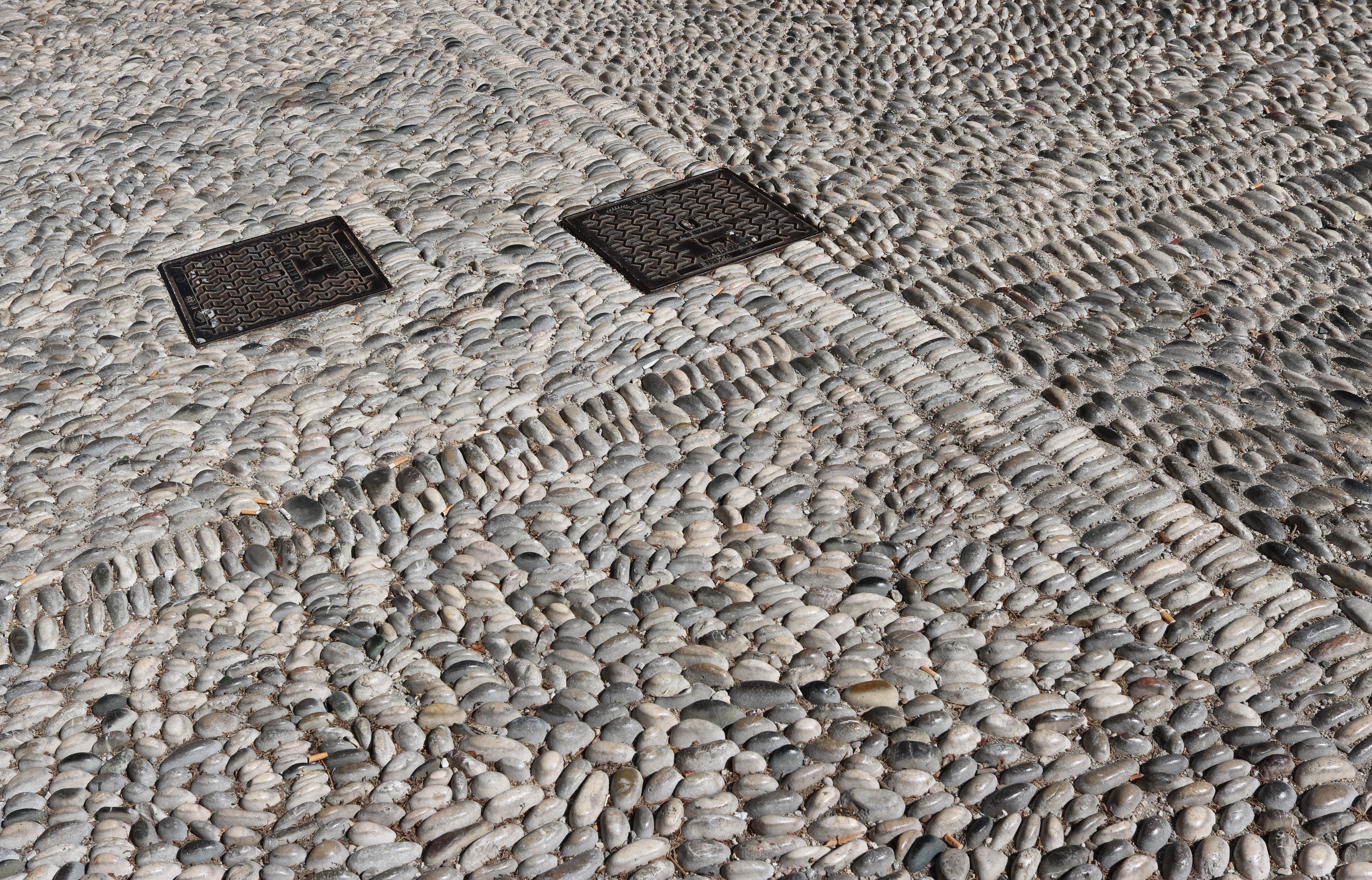
Cobblestone in Rhodes, Greece

Cobblestones were largely replaced by quarried granite setts (also known as Belgian block) in the nineteenth century. Cobblestoned and "setted" streets gradually gave way to macadam roads and later to tarmac, and finally to asphalt concrete at the beginning of the 20th century. However, cobblestones are often retained in historic areas, even for streets with modern vehicular traffic. Many older villages and cities in Europe are still paved with cobblestones or pitched.

=== Use today ===
With the advent of asphalt and concrete in the 20th century, the use of cobblestones declined. These newer materials were cheaper and easier to install, leading to the replacement of many cobblestone streets. However, cobblestone streets have been preserved in many historic districts around the world, valued for their historical significance and aesthetic charm. In recent decades, cobblestones have become a popular material for paving newly pedestrianised streets in Europe. In this case, the noisy nature of the surface is an advantage as pedestrians can hear approaching vehicles. The visual cues of the cobblestones also clarify that the area is more than just a normal street. The use of cobblestones and setts is also considered to be a more "upmarket" roadway solution, having been described as "unique and artistic" compared to the normal asphalt road environment.

In older U.S. cities such as Philadelphia; Boston; Pittsburgh; New York City; Chicago; San Francisco; New Castle; Portland, Maine; Baltimore; Charleston; and New Orleans, many of the older streets are paved in cobblestones and setts (mostly setts); however, many such streets have been paved over with asphalt, which can crack and erode away due to heavy traffic, thus revealing the original stone pavement.

In some places such as Saskatoon, Saskatchewan, Canada, as late as the 1990s some busy intersections still showed cobblestones through worn down sections of pavement. In Toronto streets, setts were used by streetcar routes and disappeared by the 1980s, but are still found in the Distillery District.

Many cities in Latin America, such as Buenos Aires, Argentina; Zacatecas and Guanajuato, in Mexico; Old San Juan, Puerto Rico; Vigan, Philippines; and Montevideo, Uruguay, are well known for their many cobblestone streets, which are still operational and in good condition. They are still maintained and repaired in the traditional manner, by placing and arranging granite stones by hand.

In the Czech Republic, there are old cobblestone paths with colored marbles and limestones. The design with three colors (red/limestone, black/limestone, white/marble) has a long tradition in Bohemia. The cubes of the old ways are handmade.

== Use in architecture ==
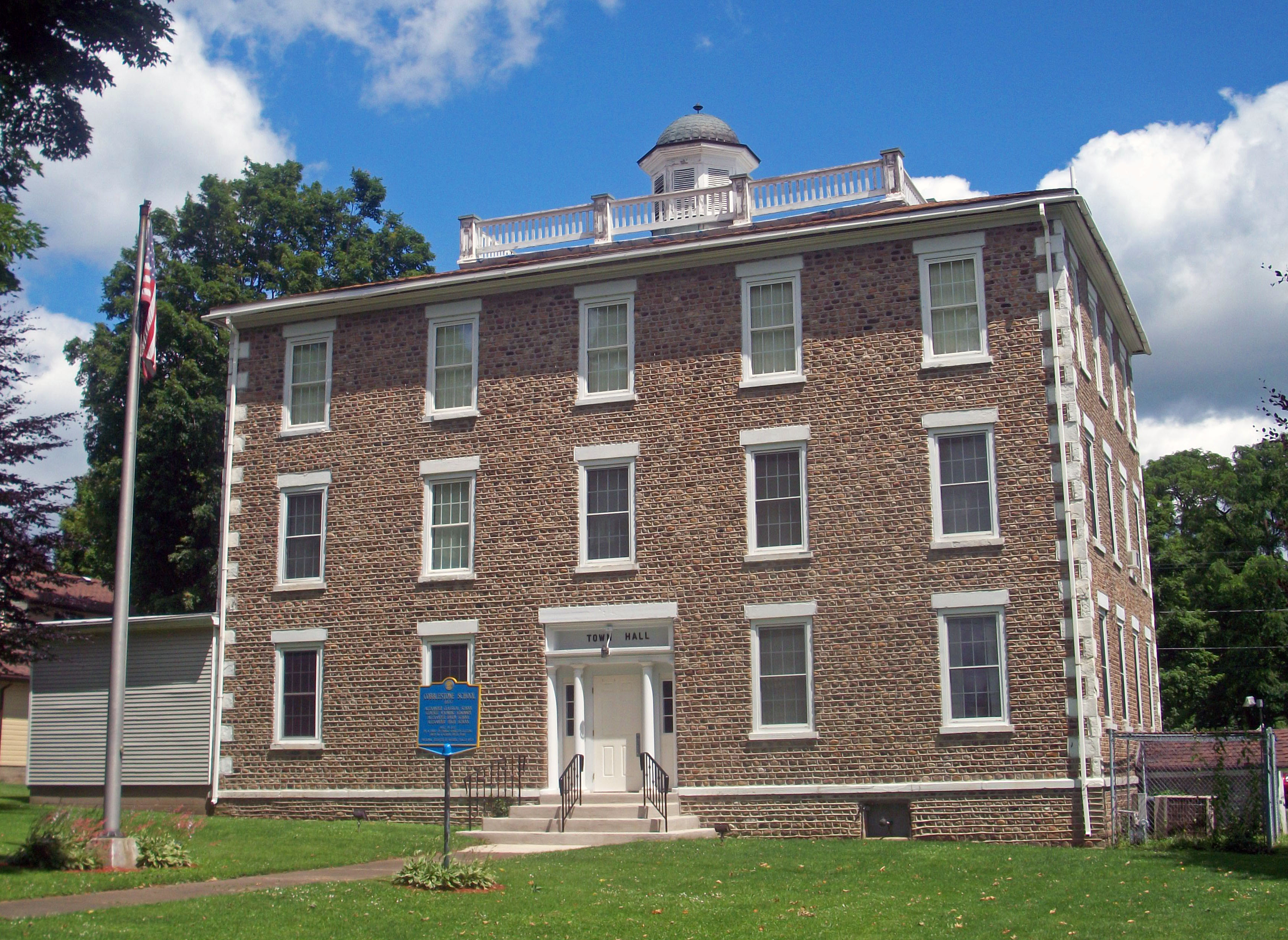
The Alexander Classical School three-story cobblestone building in Alexander, New York

In the Finger Lakes Region of New York State, the retreat of the glaciers during the last ice age left numerous small, rounded cobblestones available for building. Pre-Civil War architecture in the region made heavy use of cobblestones for walls. Today, the fewer than 600 remaining cobblestone buildings are prized as historic locations, most of them private homes. Ninety percent of the cobblestone buildings in America can be found within a 75-mile radius of Rochester, New York. There is also a cluster of cobblestone buildings in the Town of Paris, Ontario. In addition to homes, cobblestones were used to build barns, stagecoach taverns, smokehouses, stores, churches, schools, factories, and cemetery markers.

The only public cobblestone building in the US is the Alexander Classical School, located in Alexander, New York.

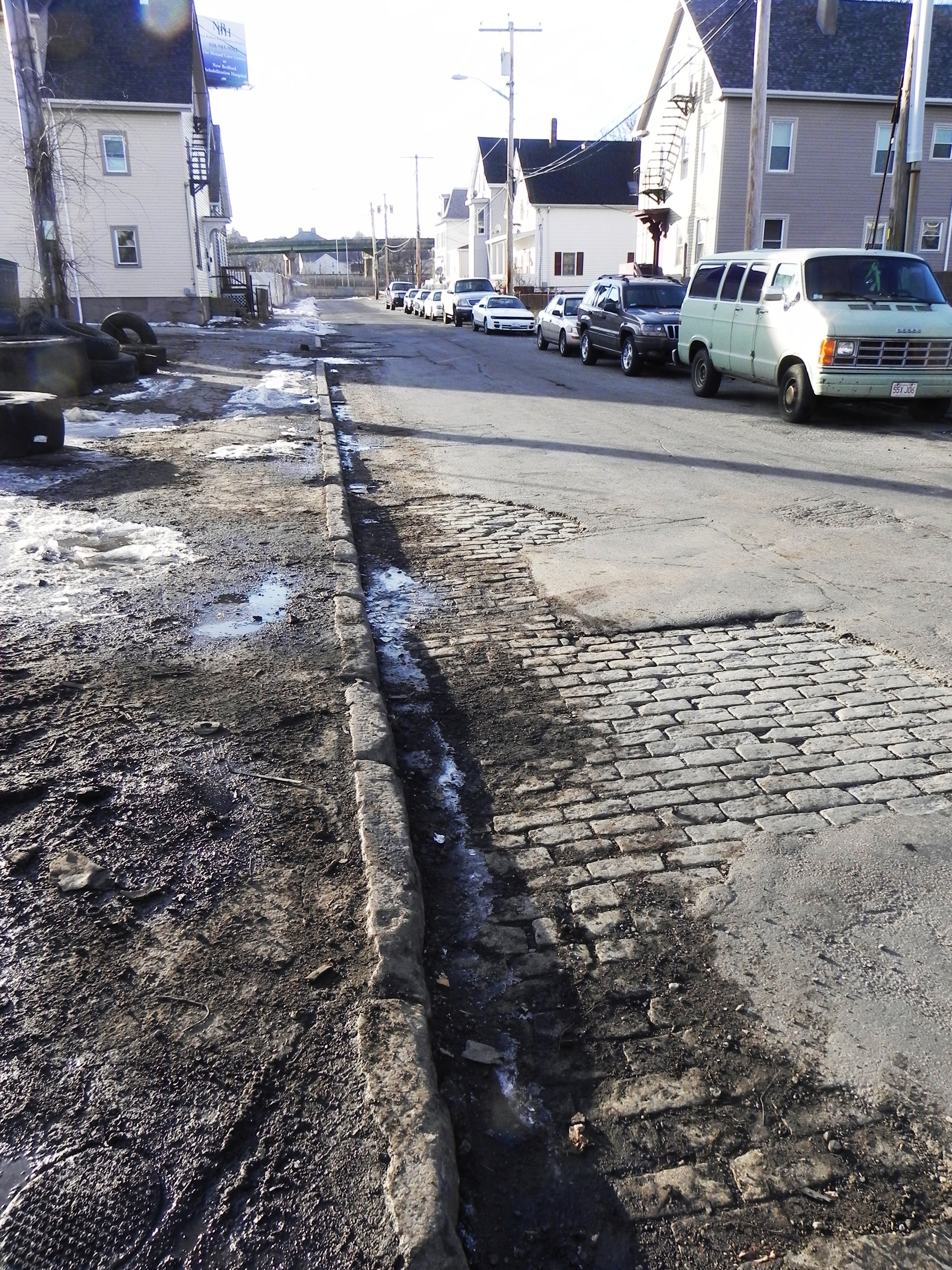
Setts visible beneath cracked asphalt in New Bedford, MA

== Implications for disabled people ==
Cobblestone may not be accessible for disabled people, particularly wheelchair users. Wheelchair users and other disabled people may opt to avoid streets and sidewalks made with cobblestone. Some European cities, such as Breda in the Netherlands, have tried to preserve their historic aesthetic while also making cobblestone pavement more accessible for disabled people by slicing the cobblestone to be flat on the surface.

The United States Access Board does not specify which materials a sidewalk must be made of in order to be ADA compliant, but does state that "cobblestones can significantly impede wheelchair movement" and that sidewalks must not have surface variances of greater than one inch (2.54 cm). Due to the accessibility challenges of cobblestone, the Federal Highway Administration recommends against the use of cobblestone and bricks in its accessibility guide for sidewalks and crosswalks.

== See also ==
- Calade, a harmonious, decorative arrangement of medium-sized pebbles, fixed to the ground
- Flagstone
- List of cobblestone buildings
- List of cobblestone streets
- Portuguese pavement
