= Châteauneuf-Miravail =

Châteauneuf-Miravail Chastèunòu-Miravalh (Occitan)
- Commune
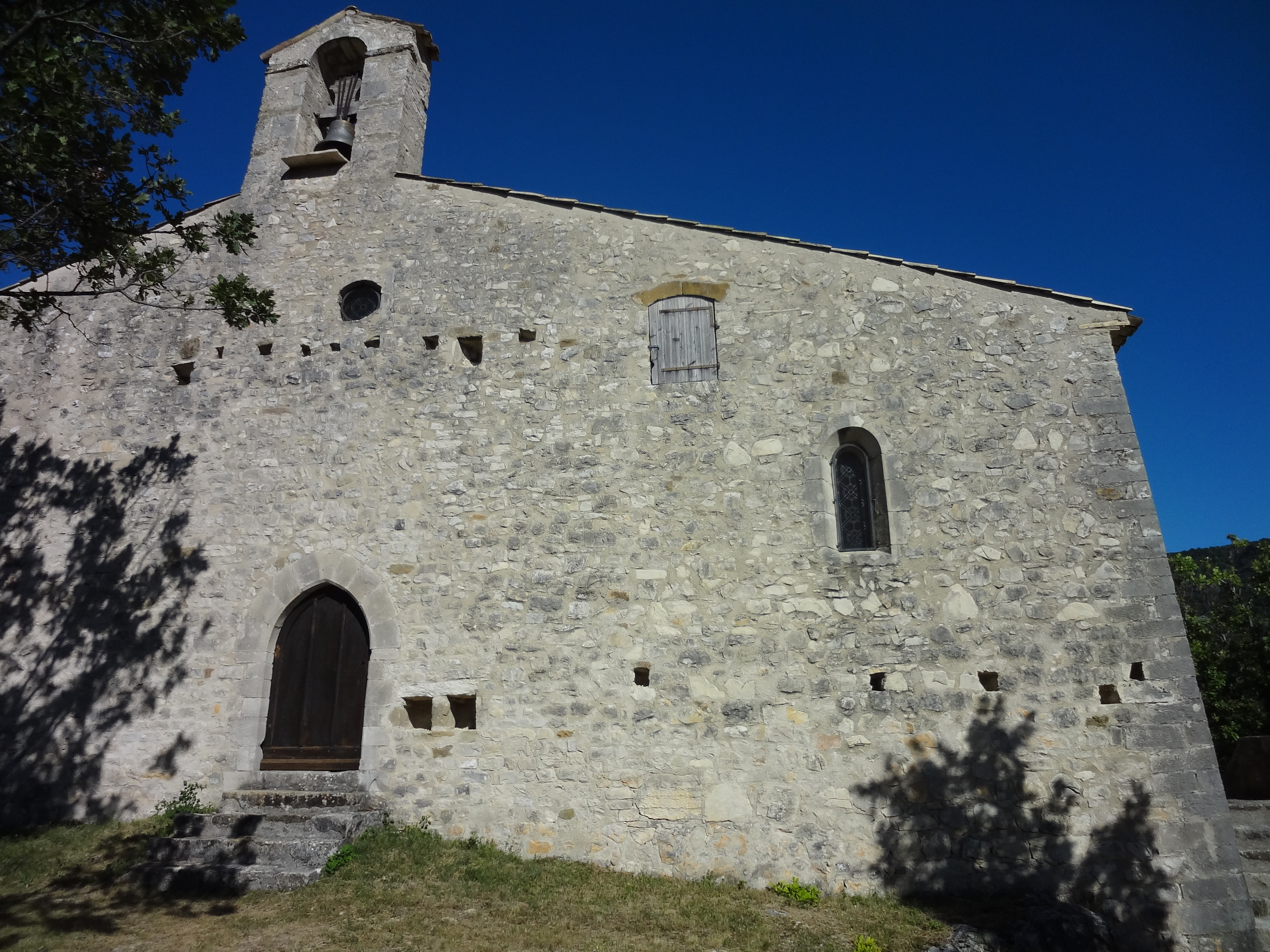
- The chapel of Saint-Mary, in Châteauneuf-Miravail

- Coat of arms
- Location of Châteauneuf-Miravail
- Location within France Location within Provence-Alpes-Côte d'Azur
- Coordinates: 44°09′47″N 5°43′38″E
- Country: France
- Region: Provence-Alpes-Côte d'Azur
- Department: Alpes-de-Haute-Provence
- Arrondissement: Forcalquier
- Canton: Sisteron
- Intercommunality: Jabron Lure Vançon Durance

Government
  - Mayor (2026–32): Jean-Philippe Martinod
- Area^{1}: 19.7 km^{2} (7.6 sq mi)
- Elevation: 710 m (2,330 ft)
- Highest elevation: 1,628 m (5,341 ft)
- Lowest elevation: 619 m (2,031 ft)
- Population (2023): 76
  - Density: 3.9/km^{2} (10/sq mi)
- Demonym: Castelnovins
- Time zone: UTC+01:00 (CET)
  - Summer (DST): UTC+02:00 (CEST)
- INSEE/Postal code: 04051 /04200
- ^{1} French Land Register data, which excludes lakes, ponds, glaciers > 1 km^{2} (0.386 sq mi or 247 acres) and river estuaries.

Châteauneuf-Miravail (French: [ʃɑtonœf miʁavaj]; Occitan: Chastèunòu-Miravalh) is a commune in the Alpes-de-Haute-Provence department in southeastern France.

== Geography ==
The Jabron and Druigne rivers run through Châteauneuf-Miravail.

== History ==
An altar to the Roman god Mars dates back to the Gallo-Roman era.

Charters for the locality first appeared in the 12th century, when Châteauneuf-Miravail acted as a stronghold for the town of Saint-Vincent-sur-Jabron.

In 1792, during the revolution, a patriotic society was formed in the town. Following the decree of the National Convention of October 16, 1793 for towns holding names reminiscent of royalty or feudalism to create new names, the community became known as Auche-la-Garde.

== Population ==
Historical population
Year	Pop.	±% p.a.
1968	54	—
1975	62	+1.99%
1982	71	+1.96%
1990	57	−2.71%
1999	68	+1.98%
2007	73	+0.89%
2012	78	+1.33%
2017	69	−2.42%
2023	76	+1.62%
Source: INSEE

Inhabitants are known as Castelnovins in French.

== Sights ==
The Jabron valley is dominated by the ruins of the 17th century Chateau Graves. On the Aouche la Garde ridge stand a tower and curtain wall, now in ruins, which survey the Jabron and Chateauneuf valleys.

In Lange, the principal section of the commune, one home is inscribed with the date 1620 on its lintel.

The church of Saint Mari (also Saint Mary) in Lange is considered exceptional by French historian Raymond Collier, who gives the building considerable attention in his book La Haute-Provence monumentale et artistique. The nave and apse of the church are barrel vaulted. The apse is rectangular in shape with a flat chevet. The posterior walls of each aisle are of original 17th century construction, a rarity for the region. The current facade has been modified from the original. The wall and bell tower are on the same axis, but a different axis from that of the nave. The choir and the nave are of typical construction for the late 13th and early 14th century period in which they were built.

The church holds a statue of Saint Mary. The image of the crucifixion contained within the church shows Christ on the cross, with the Virgin and two unidentified people to his left. The image is unusual in that it is surrounded by two penitent figures. A painting of Saint Roch, as a pilgrim with his dog, with the patron saint of the church can also be seen. This painting is rare in that Saint Roch is typically depicted in sculpture rather than pictorial image.

Another painting dating to 1687, although painted in a post-primitive style, represents Saint Joseph holding a scepter and book. On each of his sides stand Saint Patrick and Saint Eloi. The painting is considered to be an historic monument.

== See also ==
- Communes of the Alpes-de-Haute-Provence department
