= Salignac, Alpes-de-Haute-Provence =

Salignac
- Commune
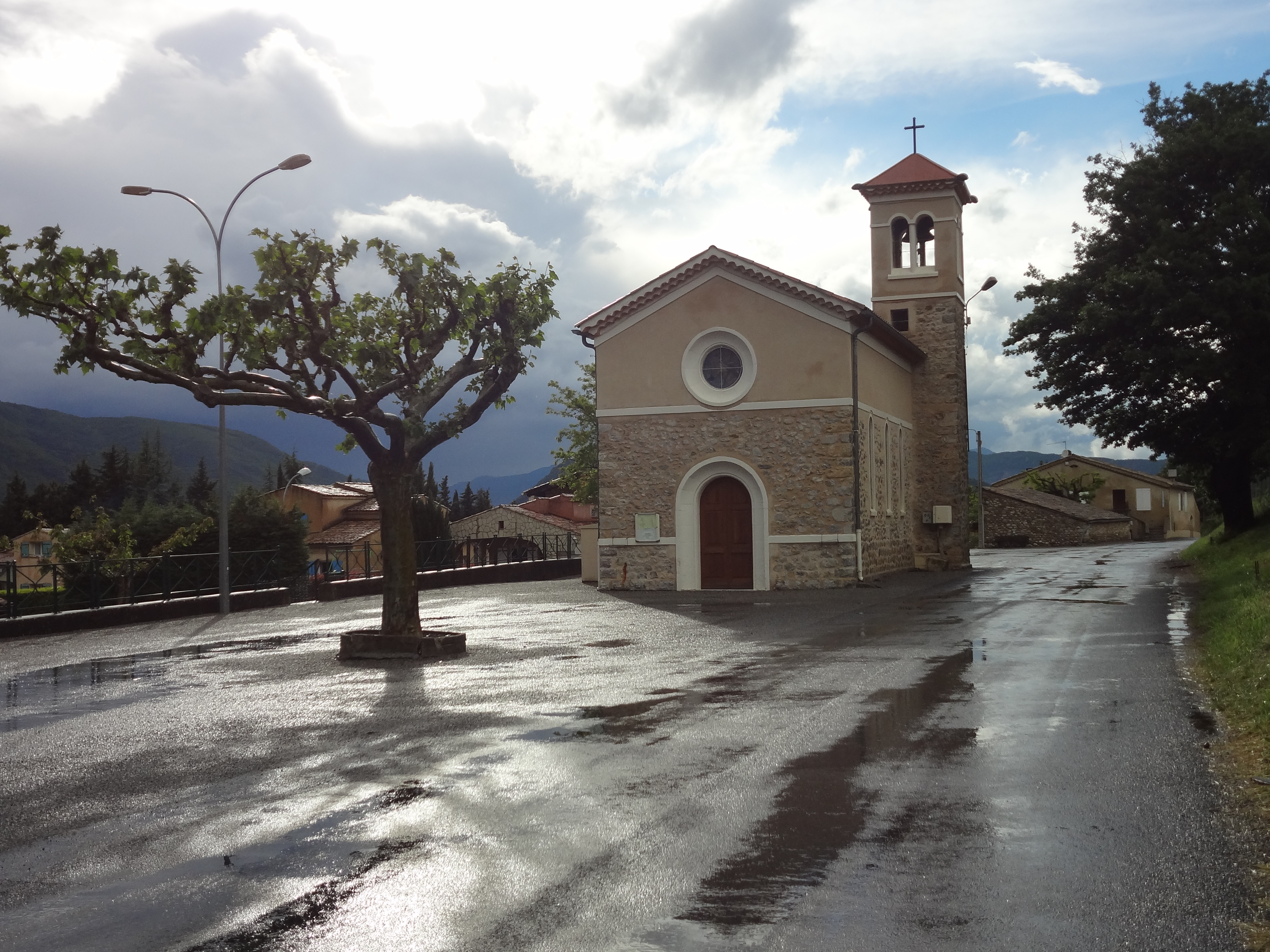
- The church of Sainte-Thérèse of the Child Jesus, in Salignac

- Coat of arms
- Location of Salignac
- Location within France Location within Provence-Alpes-Côte d'Azur
- Coordinates: 44°09′23″N 5°59′00″E
- Country: France
- Region: Provence-Alpes-Côte d'Azur
- Department: Alpes-de-Haute-Provence
- Arrondissement: Forcalquier
- Canton: Sisteron
- Intercommunality: Jabron Lure Vançon Durance

Government
  - Mayor (2026–32): Angélique Euloge
- Area^{1}: 14.42 km^{2} (5.57 sq mi)
- Elevation: 438 m (1,437 ft)
- Highest elevation: 802 m (2,631 ft)
- Lowest elevation: 431 m (1,414 ft)
- Population (2023): 678
  - Density: 47.0/km^{2} (122/sq mi)
- Time zone: UTC+01:00 (CET)
  - Summer (DST): UTC+02:00 (CEST)
- INSEE/Postal code: 04200 /04290
- ^{1} French Land Register data, which excludes lakes, ponds, glaciers > 1 km^{2} (0.386 sq mi or 247 acres) and river estuaries.

Salignac (French pronunciation: [saliɲak]; Occitan: Salinhac) is a commune in the Alpes-de-Haute-Provence department in southeastern France.

== Population ==
Historical population
Year	Pop.	±% p.a.
1968	127	—
1975	169	+4.17%
1982	225	+4.17%
1990	310	+4.09%
1999	399	+2.84%
2007	504	+2.96%
2012	598	+3.48%
2017	634	+1.18%
2023	678	+1.12%
Source: INSEE

== See also ==
- Communes of the Alpes-de-Haute-Provence department
