= Canton of Sisteron =

Coordinates: 44°11′28″N 5°56′50″E

Sisteron
- Canton
- Interactive map of Sisteron
- Country: France
- Region: Provence-Alpes-Côte d'Azur
- Department: Alpes-de-Haute-Provence
- No. of communes: {{{nbcomm}}}
- Area: 451.58 km^{2} (174.36 sq mi)
- Population (2023): 13,369
  - Density: 29.605/km^{2} (76.676/sq mi)
- INSEE code: 04 14

The canton of Sisteron is an administrative division in southeastern France. At the French canton reorganisation which came into effect in March 2015, the canton was expanded from 5 to 15 communes:

1. Authon
2. Bevons
3. Châteauneuf-Miravail
4. Curel
5. Entrepierres
6. Mison
7. Noyers-sur-Jabron
8. Les Omergues
9. Peipin
10. Saint-Geniez
11. Saint-Vincent-sur-Jabron
12. Salignac
13. Sisteron
14. Sourribes
15. Valbelle

== Demographics ==
Historical population
Year	Pop.	±% p.a.
2013	12,660	—
2018	12,979	+0.50%
Source: INSEE

== See also ==
- Cantons of the Alpes-de-Haute-Provence department
- Communes of France
