= Bevons =

- Commune
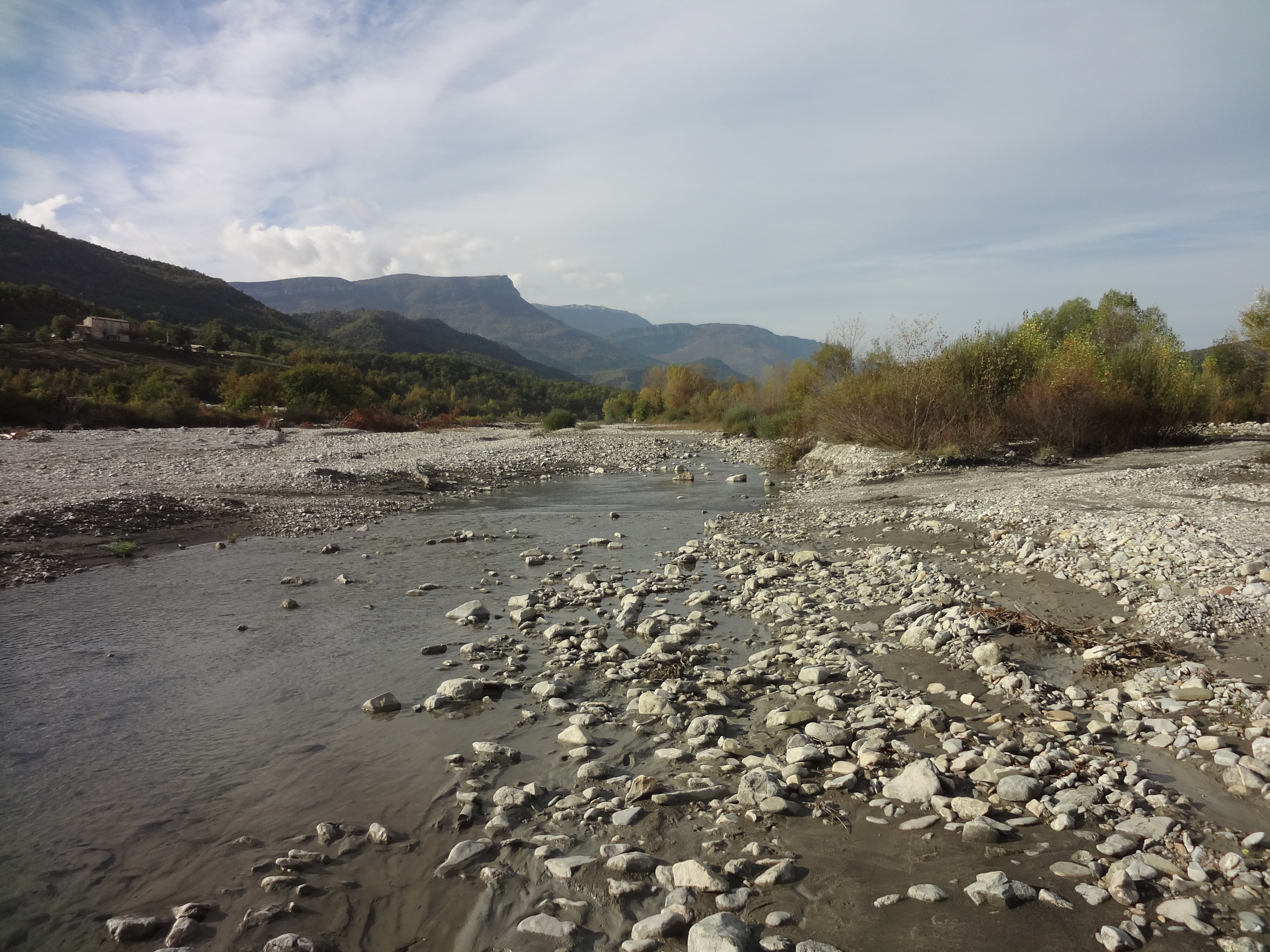
- A ford across the Jabron, in Bevons

- Coat of arms
- Location of Bevons
- Location within France Location within Provence-Alpes-Côte d'Azur
- Coordinates: 44°10′52″N 5°53′04″E
- Country: France
- Region: Provence-Alpes-Côte d'Azur
- Department: Alpes-de-Haute-Provence
- Arrondissement: Forcalquier
- Canton: Sisteron
- Intercommunality: Jabron Lure Vançon Durance

Government
  - Mayor (2026–32): Marc Huser
- Area^{1}: 11.26 km^{2} (4.35 sq mi)
- Elevation: 303 m (994 ft)
- Highest elevation: 969 m (3,179 ft)
- Lowest elevation: 485 m (1,591 ft)
- Population (2023): 260
  - Density: 23/km^{2} (60/sq mi)
- Time zone: UTC+01:00 (CET)
  - Summer (DST): UTC+02:00 (CEST)
- INSEE/Postal code: 04027 /04200
- ^{1} French Land Register data, which excludes lakes, ponds, glaciers > 1 km^{2} (0.386 sq mi or 247 acres) and river estuaries.

Bevons (Occitan: Bevèm) is a commune in the Alpes-de-Haute-Provence department in southeastern France.

== Population ==
Historical population
Year	Pop.	±% p.a.
1968	79	—
1975	89	+1.72%
1982	91	+0.32%
1990	115	+2.97%
1999	132	+1.54%
2007	164	+2.75%
2012	234	+7.37%
2017	240	+0.51%
2023	260	+1.34%
Source: INSEE

== See also ==
- Communes of the Alpes-de-Haute-Provence department
