= Saint-Geniez =

- Commune
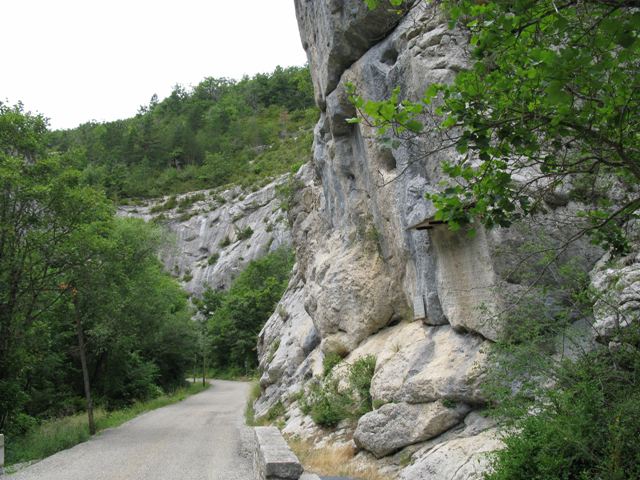
- The Sisteron road, in Saint-Geniez

- Coat of arms
- Location of Saint-Geniez
- Location within France Location within Provence-Alpes-Côte d'Azur
- Coordinates: 44°14′45″N 6°03′13″E
- Country: France
- Region: Provence-Alpes-Côte d'Azur
- Department: Alpes-de-Haute-Provence
- Arrondissement: Forcalquier
- Canton: Sisteron

Government
  - Mayor (2026–32): Olivier Chabrand
- Area^{1}: 38.94 km^{2} (15.03 sq mi)
- Highest elevation: 1,705 m (5,594 ft)
- Lowest elevation: 637 m (2,090 ft)
- Population (2023): 112
  - Density: 2.88/km^{2} (7.45/sq mi)
- Time zone: UTC+01:00 (CET)
  - Summer (DST): UTC+02:00 (CEST)
- INSEE/Postal code: 04179 /04200
- ^{1} French Land Register data, which excludes lakes, ponds, glaciers > 1 km^{2} (0.386 sq mi or 247 acres) and river estuaries.

Saint-Geniez (Vivaro-Alpine: Sant Giniés) is a commune in the Alpes-de-Haute-Provence department in southeastern France.

== Population ==
Historical population
Year	Pop.	±% p.a.
1968	67	—
1975	51	−3.82%
1982	59	+2.10%
1990	55	−0.87%
1999	90	+5.62%
2007	101	+1.45%
2012	89	−2.50%
2017	96	+1.53%
2023	112	+2.60%
Source: INSEE

== See also ==
- Communes of the Alpes-de-Haute-Provence department
