= Calade =

Type of pebble arrangement

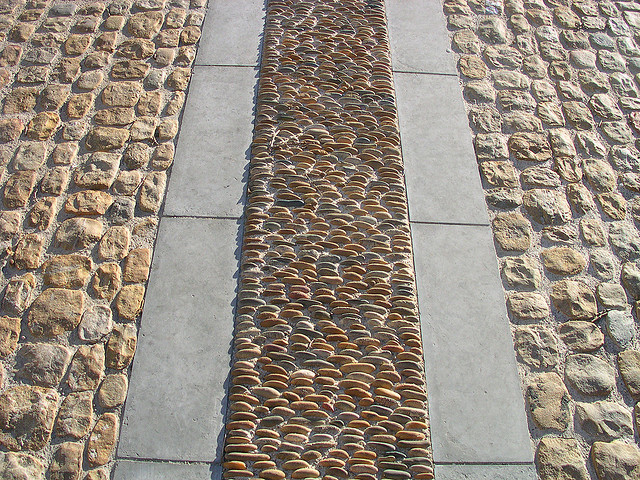
Calade in Avignon

Calade is a French term for a harmonious, decorative and useful arrangement of medium-sized pebbles, fixed to the ground.

Rue en calade describes a road with a surface composed in this way—essentially a cobblestone road. These are found predominantly in the French region of Provence, and generally in the Mediterranean area.

The corresponding term in Italian is risseu, a term borrowed from Ligurian.
