= Valbelle =

- Commune
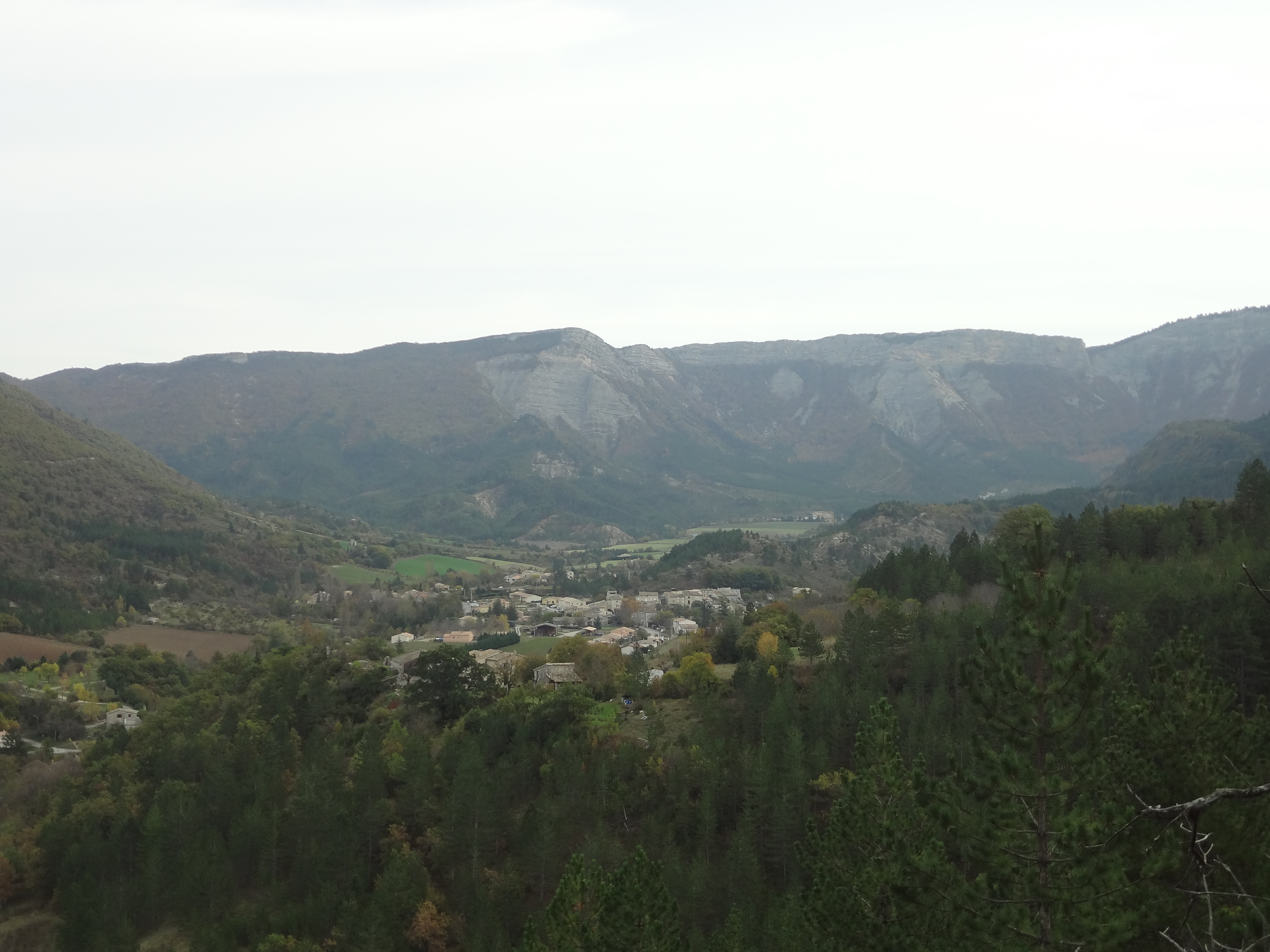
- The village of Valbelle nestled in the valley, and the cirque

- Coat of arms
- Location of Valbelle
- Location within France Location within Provence-Alpes-Côte d'Azur
- Coordinates: 44°08′55″N 5°52′56″E
- Country: France
- Region: Provence-Alpes-Côte d'Azur
- Department: Alpes-de-Haute-Provence
- Arrondissement: Forcalquier
- Canton: Sisteron

Government
  - Mayor (2026–32): Pierre-Yves Vadot
- Area^{1}: 32.99 km^{2} (12.74 sq mi)
- Elevation: 580 m (1,900 ft)
- Highest elevation: 1,655 m (5,430 ft)
- Lowest elevation: 494 m (1,621 ft)
- Population (2023): 238
  - Density: 7.21/km^{2} (18.7/sq mi)
- Time zone: UTC+01:00 (CET)
  - Summer (DST): UTC+02:00 (CEST)
- INSEE/Postal code: 04229 /04200
- ^{1} French Land Register data, which excludes lakes, ponds, glaciers > 1 km^{2} (0.386 sq mi or 247 acres) and river estuaries.

Valbelle is a commune in the Alpes-de-Haute-Provence department in southeastern France.

== Population ==
Historical population
Year	Pop.	±% p.a.
1968	98	—
1975	96	−0.29%
1982	121	+3.36%
1990	156	+3.23%
1999	214	+3.57%
2007	233	+1.07%
2012	233	+0.00%
2017	278	+3.59%
2023	238	−2.56%
Source: INSEE

== See also ==
- Communes of the Alpes-de-Haute-Provence department
