= Les Omergues =

- Commune
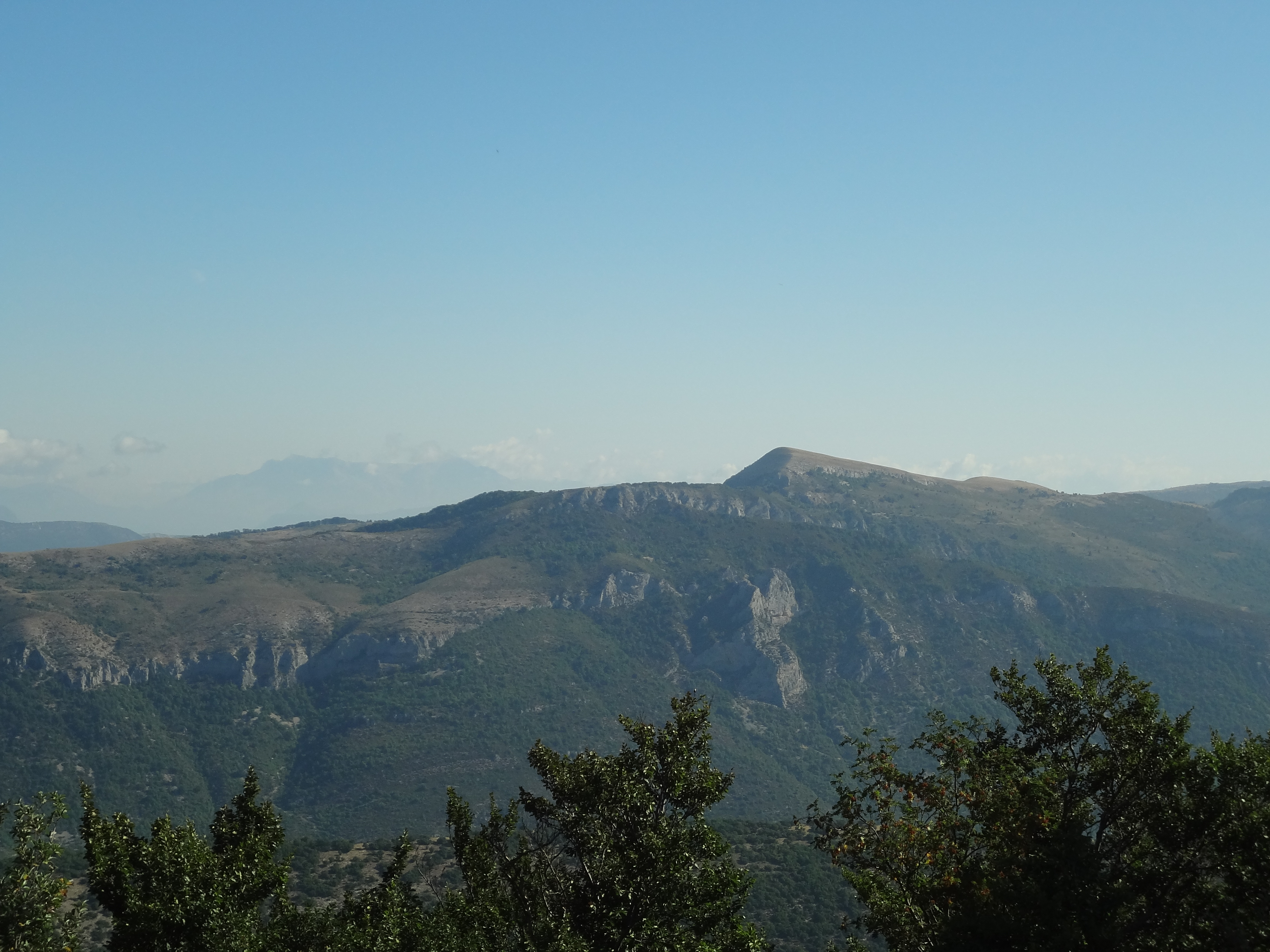
- Crête des Serres

- Coat of arms
- Location of Les Omergues
- Location within France Location within Provence-Alpes-Côte d'Azur
- Coordinates: 44°10′21″N 5°36′30″E
- Country: France
- Region: Provence-Alpes-Côte d'Azur
- Department: Alpes-de-Haute-Provence
- Arrondissement: Forcalquier
- Canton: Sisteron

Government
  - Mayor (2026–32): Alain Coste
- Area^{1}: 34.22 km^{2} (13.21 sq mi)
- Elevation: 820 m (2,690 ft)
- Highest elevation: 1,452 m (4,764 ft)
- Lowest elevation: 789 m (2,589 ft)
- Population (2023): 135
  - Density: 3.95/km^{2} (10.2/sq mi)
- Time zone: UTC+01:00 (CET)
  - Summer (DST): UTC+02:00 (CEST)
- INSEE/Postal code: 04140 /04200
- ^{1} French Land Register data, which excludes lakes, ponds, glaciers > 1 km^{2} (0.386 sq mi or 247 acres) and river estuaries.

Les Omergues (French pronunciation: [le.z‿ɔmɛʁɡ]; Occitan: Leis Amèrgues) is a commune in the Alpes-de-Haute-Provence department in southeastern France.

== Population ==
Historical population
Year	Pop.	±% p.a.
1968	110	—
1975	87	−3.30%
1982	101	+2.15%
1990	65	−5.36%
1999	99	+4.79%
2007	121	+2.54%
2012	127	+0.97%
2017	130	+0.47%
2023	135	+0.63%
Source: INSEE

== See also ==
- Communes of the Alpes-de-Haute-Provence department
