= La Motte-du-Caire =

- Commune
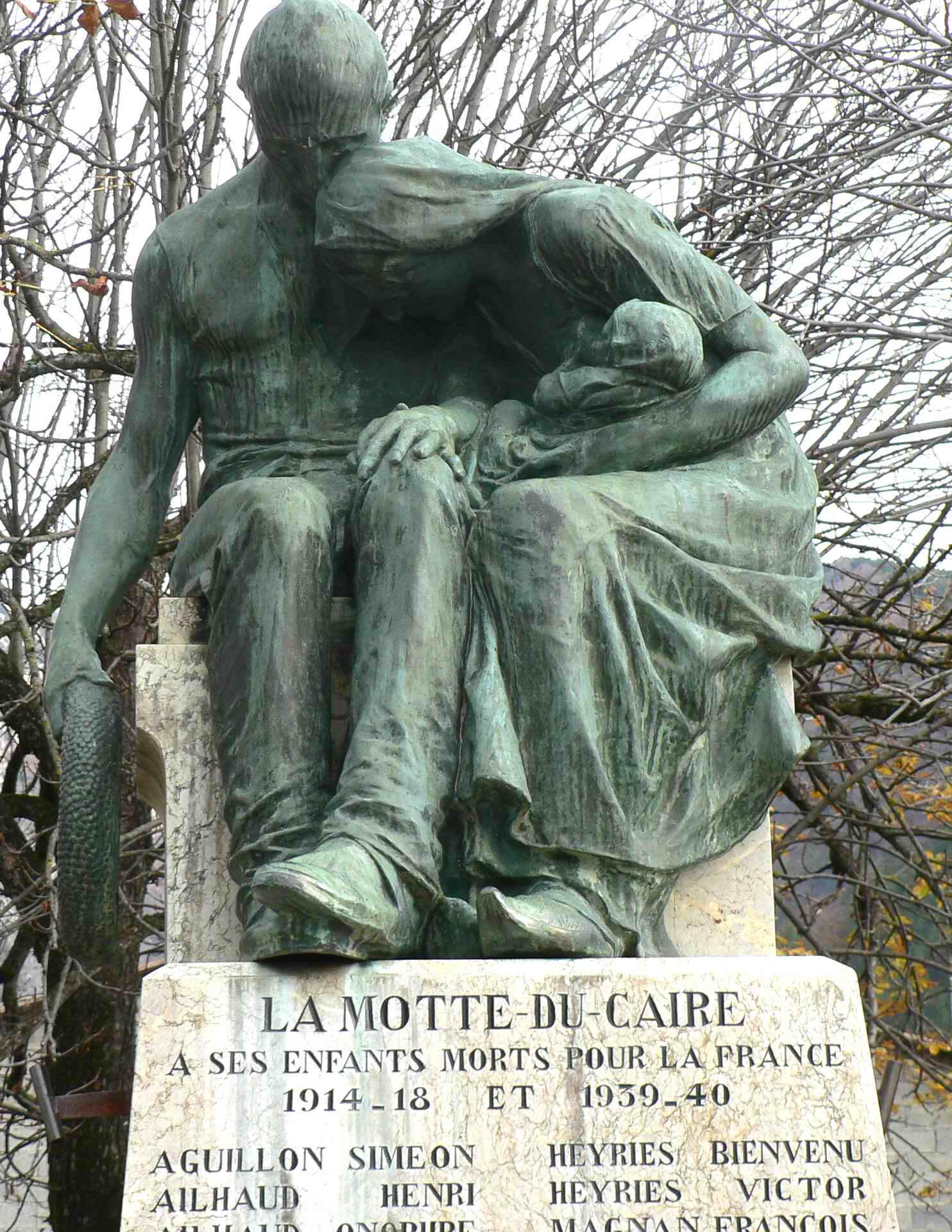
- War memorial

- Coat of arms
- Location of La Motte-du-Caire
- Location within France Location within Provence-Alpes-Côte d'Azur
- Coordinates: 44°20′40″N 6°01′45″E
- Country: France
- Region: Provence-Alpes-Côte d'Azur
- Department: Alpes-de-Haute-Provence
- Arrondissement: Forcalquier
- Canton: Seyne

Government
  - Mayor (2026–32): Patrick Meyere
- Area^{1}: 27.27 km^{2} (10.53 sq mi)
- Elevation: 707 m (2,320 ft)
- Highest elevation: 1,547 m (5,075 ft)
- Lowest elevation: 623 m (2,044 ft)
- Population (2023): 546
  - Density: 20.0/km^{2} (51.9/sq mi)
- Time zone: UTC+01:00 (CET)
  - Summer (DST): UTC+02:00 (CEST)
- INSEE/Postal code: 04134 /04250
- ^{1} French Land Register data, which excludes lakes, ponds, glaciers > 1 km^{2} (0.386 sq mi or 247 acres) and river estuaries.

La Motte-du-Caire (French pronunciation: [la mɔt dy kɛʁ]; Occitan: La Mota dau Caire, before 1988: La Motte) is a commune in the Alpes-de-Haute-Provence department in southeastern France.

== Population ==
Historical population
Year	Pop.	±% p.a.
1968	347	—
1975	420	+2.77%
1982	403	−0.59%
1990	438	+1.05%
1999	484	+1.12%
2007	498	+0.36%
2012	528	+1.18%
2017	560	+1.18%
2023	546	−0.42%
Source: INSEE

== See also ==
- Communes of the Alpes-de-Haute-Provence department
