= Noyers-sur-Jabron =

- Commune
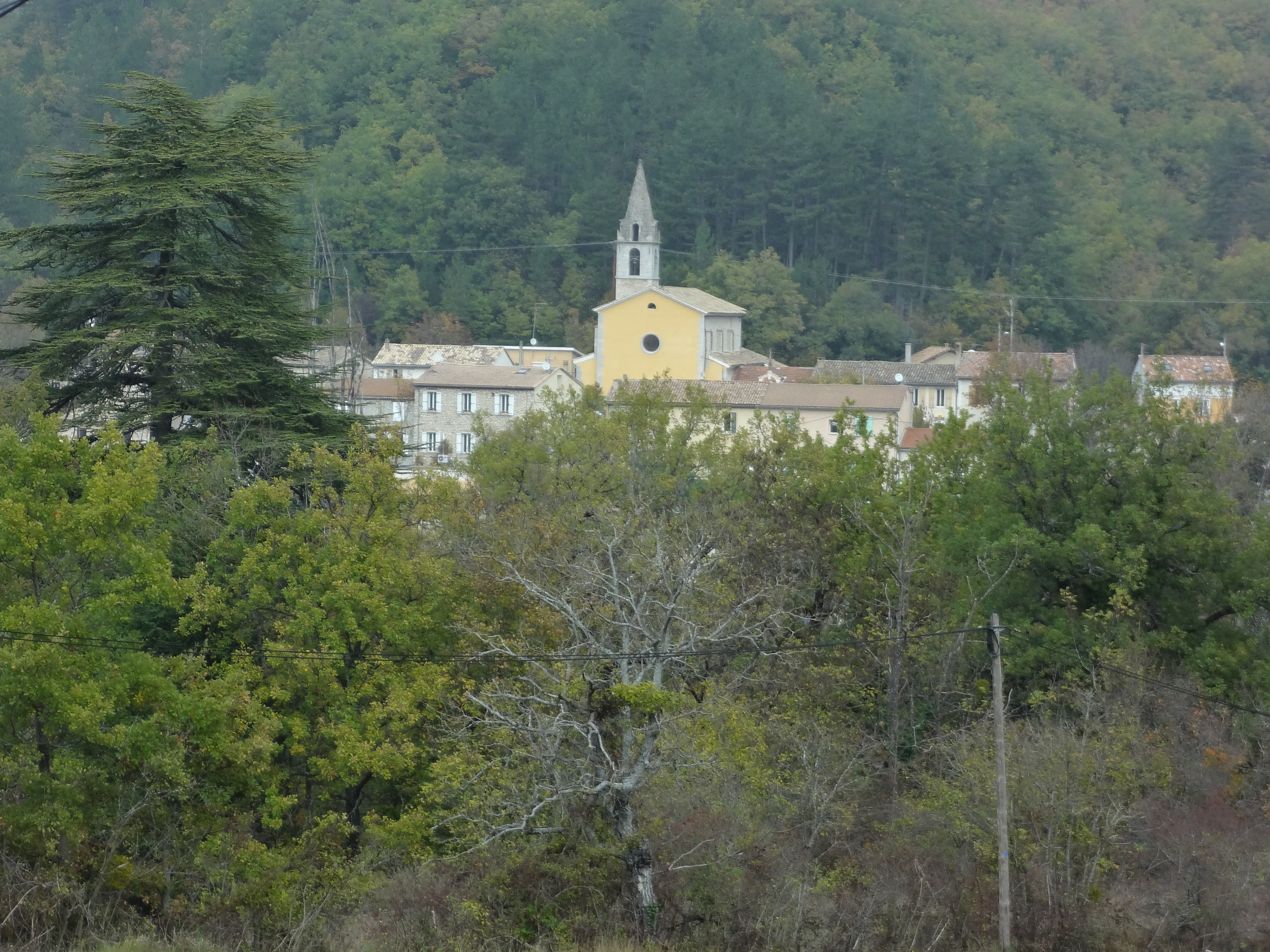
- A general view of the village of Noyers-sur-Jabron

- Coat of arms
- Location of Noyers-sur-Jabron
- Location within France Location within Provence-Alpes-Côte d'Azur
- Coordinates: 44°10′11″N 5°50′02″E
- Country: France
- Region: Provence-Alpes-Côte d'Azur
- Department: Alpes-de-Haute-Provence
- Arrondissement: Forcalquier
- Canton: Sisteron
- Intercommunality: Jabron Lure Vançon Durance

Government
  - Mayor (2026–32): Brice Chadebec
- Area^{1}: 56.58 km^{2} (21.85 sq mi)
- Highest elevation: 1,825 m (5,988 ft)
- Lowest elevation: 524 m (1,719 ft)
- Population (2023): 525
  - Density: 9.28/km^{2} (24.0/sq mi)
- Time zone: UTC+01:00 (CET)
  - Summer (DST): UTC+02:00 (CEST)
- INSEE/Postal code: 04139 /04200
- ^{1} French Land Register data, which excludes lakes, ponds, glaciers > 1 km^{2} (0.386 sq mi or 247 acres) and river estuaries.

Noyers-sur-Jabron (French pronunciation: [nwaje syʁ ʒabʁɔ̃]; Occitan: Noguièrs) is a commune in the Alpes-de-Haute-Provence department in southeastern France.

== Population ==
Historical population
Year	Pop.	±% p.a.
1968	252	—
1975	232	−1.17%
1982	240	+0.49%
1990	291	+2.44%
1999	337	+1.64%
2007	365	+1.00%
2012	471	+5.23%
2017	524	+2.16%
2023	525	+0.03%
Source: INSEE

== See also ==
- Communes of the Alpes-de-Haute-Provence department
