= Curel, Alpes-de-Haute-Provence =

Curel
- Commune
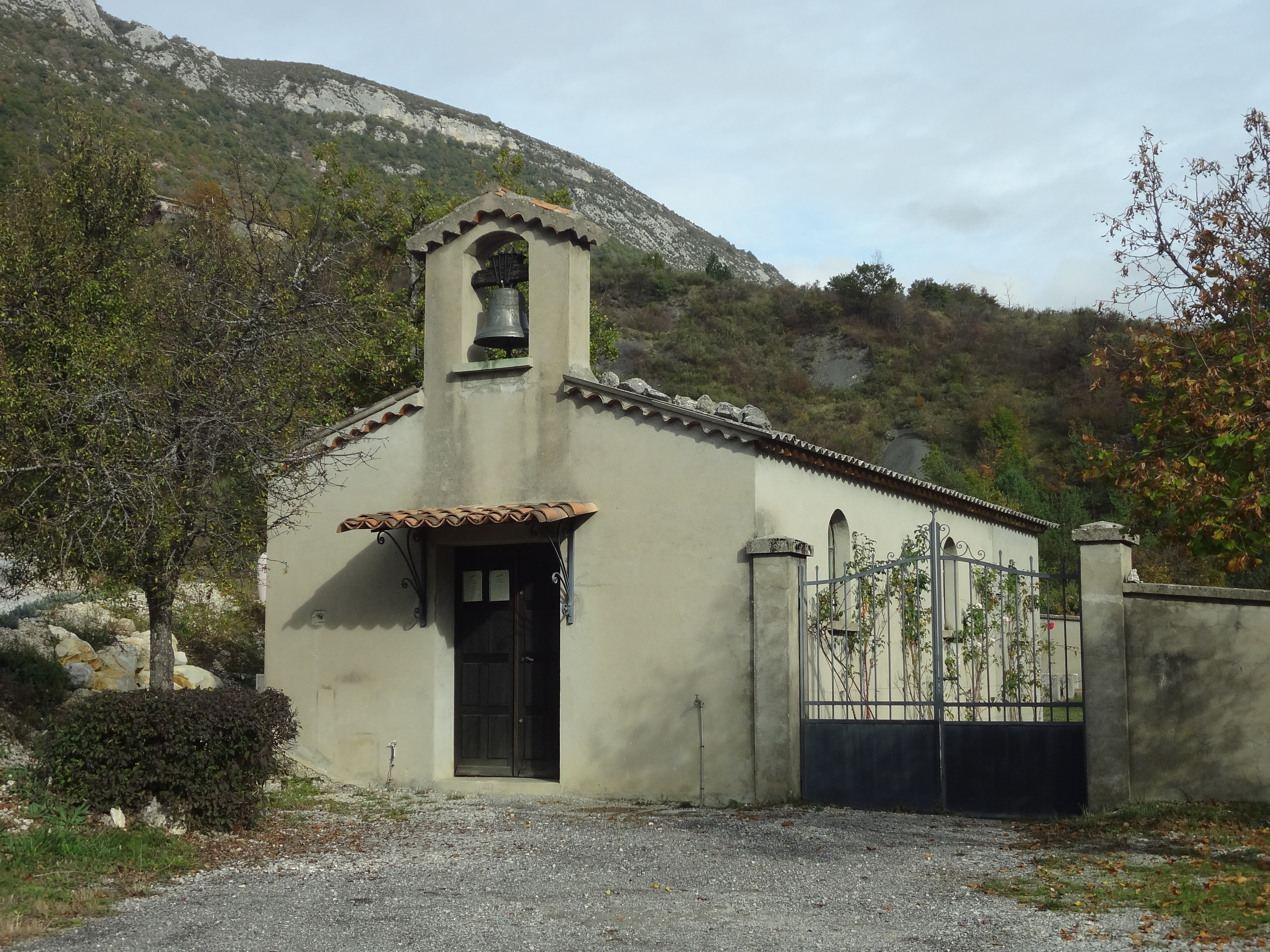
- The church of Saint-Martin, in Curel

- Coat of arms
- Location of Curel
- Location within France Location within Provence-Alpes-Côte d'Azur
- Coordinates: 44°10′40″N 5°39′45″E
- Country: France
- Region: Provence-Alpes-Côte d'Azur
- Department: Alpes-de-Haute-Provence
- Arrondissement: Forcalquier
- Canton: Sisteron
- Intercommunality: Jabron Lure Vançon Durance

Government
  - Mayor (2026–32): Thierry Bellemain
- Area^{1}: 10.45 km^{2} (4.03 sq mi)
- Elevation: 696 m (2,283 ft)
- Highest elevation: 1,440 m (4,720 ft)
- Lowest elevation: 670 m (2,200 ft)
- Population (2023): 65
  - Density: 6.2/km^{2} (16/sq mi)
- Time zone: UTC+01:00 (CET)
  - Summer (DST): UTC+02:00 (CEST)
- INSEE/Postal code: 04067 /04200
- ^{1} French Land Register data, which excludes lakes, ponds, glaciers > 1 km^{2} (0.386 sq mi or 247 acres) and river estuaries.

Curel (French pronunciation: [kyʁɛl]; Occitan: Curèu) is a commune in the Alpes-de-Haute-Provence department in southeastern France.

== Population ==
Historical population
Year	Pop.	±% p.a.
1968	38	—
1975	31	−2.87%
1982	28	−1.44%
1990	37	+3.55%
1999	57	+4.92%
2007	52	−1.14%
2012	54	+0.76%
2017	55	+0.37%
2023	65	+2.82%
Source: INSEE

== See also ==
- Communes of the Alpes-de-Haute-Provence department
