= Saint-Vincent-sur-Jabron =

- Commune
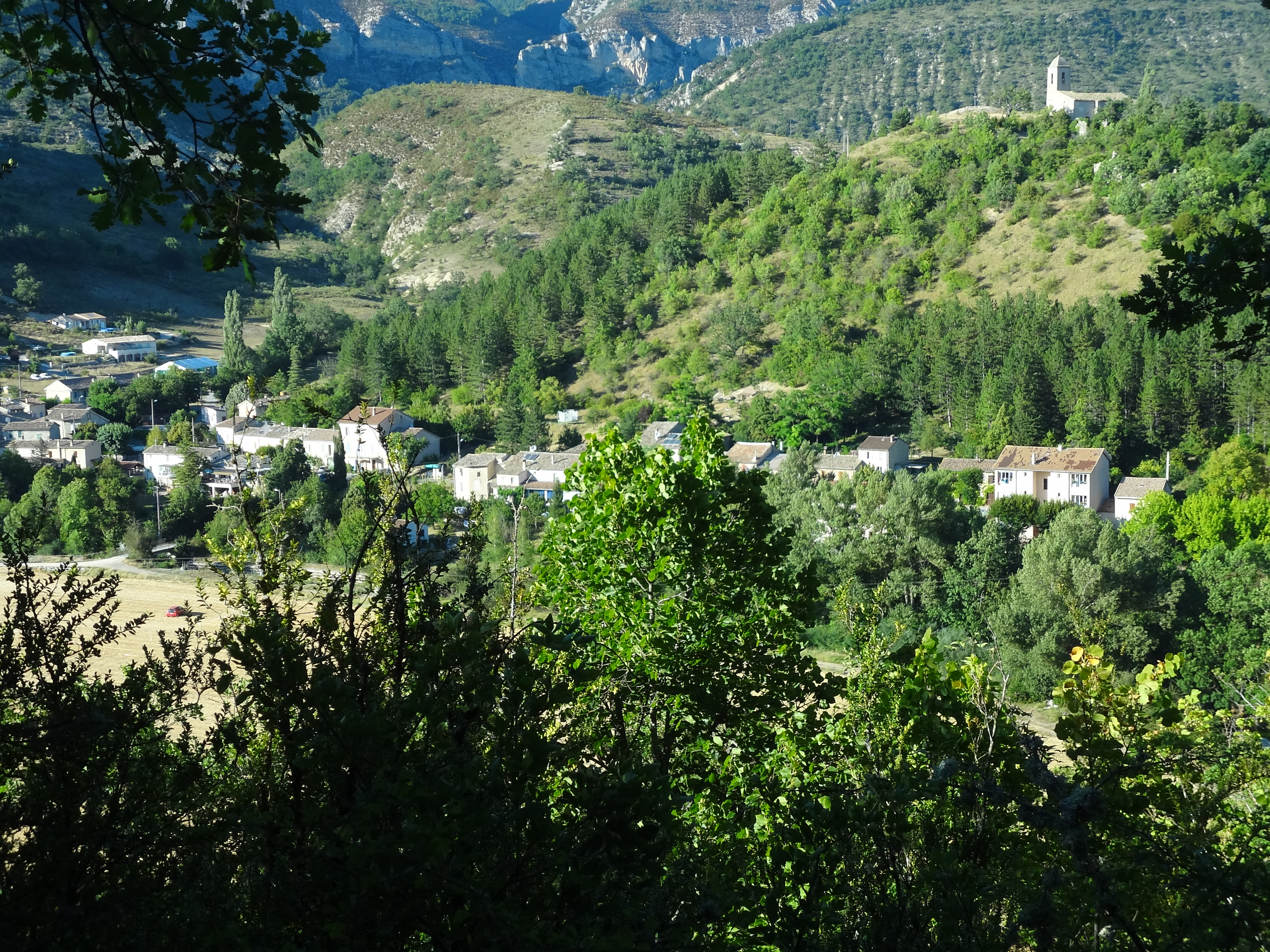
- A general view of the village of Saint-Vincent-sur-Jabron

- Coat of arms
- Location of Saint-Vincent-sur-Jabron
- Location within France Location within Provence-Alpes-Côte d'Azur
- Coordinates: 44°10′18″N 5°44′33″E
- Country: France
- Region: Provence-Alpes-Côte d'Azur
- Department: Alpes-de-Haute-Provence
- Arrondissement: Forcalquier
- Canton: Sisteron
- Intercommunality: Jabron Lure Vançon Durance

Government
  - Mayor (2026–2032): Kerouan Le Roux
- Area^{1}: 30.2 km^{2} (11.7 sq mi)
- Highest elevation: 1,723 m (5,653 ft)
- Lowest elevation: 585 m (1,919 ft)
- Population (2023): 167
  - Density: 5.53/km^{2} (14.3/sq mi)
- Time zone: UTC+01:00 (CET)
  - Summer (DST): UTC+02:00 (CEST)
- INSEE/Postal code: 04199 /04200
- ^{1} French Land Register data, which excludes lakes, ponds, glaciers > 1 km^{2} (0.386 sq mi or 247 acres) and river estuaries.

Saint-Vincent-sur-Jabron (French pronunciation: [sɛ̃ vɛ̃sɑ̃ syʁ ʒabʁɔ̃]; Occitan: Sant Vincenç de Jabron) is a commune in the Alpes-de-Haute-Provence department in southeastern France.

== Population ==
Historical population
Year	Pop.	±% p.a.
1968	148	—
1975	124	−2.50%
1982	132	+0.90%
1990	151	+1.70%
1999	192	+2.70%
2007	183	−0.60%
2012	228	+4.50%
2017	191	−3.48%
2023	167	−2.21%
Source: INSEE

== See also ==
- Communes of the Alpes-de-Haute-Provence department
