= Guillem =

Guillem (Catalan pronunciation: [ɡiˈʎɛm]) is a Catalan first name, equivalent to William in the English language, which occasionally can appear as a surname. Its origin and pronunciation are the same as its Occitan variant Guilhèm, with a different spelling.

== People with the first name Guillem ==
- Guillem I de Cerdanya ((1068–1095); anglicised William I of Cerdanya), Count of Cerdanya and Berga
- Guillem Ademar (fl. 1190/1195–1217), troubadour
- Guillem Agel i Barrière (1753-1832), publisher and printer from Roussillon
- Guillem Agulló i Salvador (1975–1993), murdered Valencian member of Maulets
- Guillem Augier Novella, 13th century French troubadour
- Guillem Balagué, sports journalist
- Guillem Bauzà (1984-), Majorcan football player
- Guillem Bofill, Catalan architect of the Girona Cathedral
- Guillem Colom Ferrà (1890–1979), Majorcan translator and poet
- Guillem d'Areny-Plandolit (1822–1876), Andorran politician who led the New Reform
- Guillem de Balaun (fl. bef. 1223), Castellan of Balazuc and troubadour
- Guillem de Cabestany (1162–1212), Catalan troubadour
- Guillem de Cervera, more commonly known as Cerverí de Girona (fl. 1259–1285), Catalan troubadour
- Guillem d'Efak, Majorcan singer born in Equatorial Guinea
- Guillem de Gellone (755 – 28 May (traditional) 812/4; Occitan spelling, Guilhèm de Gellone; anglicised William of Gellone) Second count of Toulouse, cousin of Charlemagne
- Guillem de Masdovelles (1389–1438), Catalan soldier, courtesan, politician, and poet
- Guillem de Ribes (born c.1140), nobleman (castellan) of Sant Pere de Ribes and troubadour
- Guillem de Saint Leidier, 12th century troubadour
- Guillem de Septimània (826 – 850; anglicised William of Septimania), Count of Barcelona and Toulouse
- Guillem Figueira, Languedocian jongleur and troubadour from Toulouse active at the court of the Emperor Frederick II in the 1230s
- Guillem Magret (fl. 1195–1210), troubadour
- Guillem Rainol d'At (fl. 1209), Provençal troubadour
- Guillem Ramon de Gironella, late 13th century troubadour
- Guillem Timoner Obrador (1926-), Majorcan cyclist
- Peire Guilhem de Luserna, 13th century troubadour
- Peire Guillem de Tolosa, 13th century troubadour

== People with the surname Guillem ==
- Pere Guillem, Bishop of Lleida 1126-1134
- Sylvie Guillem (1965-) French ballerina

== Other forms ==
- Guillemó or Guillemundus, Frankish Count of Rasez and Conflent, son of Berà

== See also ==
- Guilhèm, Occitan equivalent
- Guilherme, Portuguese equivalent
- Guillermo, Spanish equivalent
- Guillaume (given name), French equivalent
- Guglielmo, Italian equivalent
- William (name), English equivalent
