= Bertran Folcon d'Avignon =

Provençal nobleman and troubadour from Avignon

Bertran Folcon d'Avignon or Bertran Folco d'Avinhon (fl. 1202–1233) was a Provençal nobleman and troubadour from Avignon. He was a faithful partisan of Raymond VI and Raymond VII of Toulouse in Provence, and participated in the wars against the Albigensian Crusade. He was inside the city during the siege of Beaucaire in 1216. In 1226 Raymond VII appointed him bailiff of Avignon.

Of Bertran's poetic works are conserved only two coblas written in response to Gui de Cavalhon. This exchange between Bertran and Gui is of some historical interest. Raymond VII had moved an army against Castelnou d'Arry early in 1220 but was forced to lift his siege to deal with an offensive of Amaury de Montfort. He returned to besiege the place in July and brought in Gui to oversee the circumvallation. In the third month of the siege, October–November, Gui decided to request the assistance of Bertran in a poem, with the intention of hurrying the town's surrender. Gui evidently knew Bertran from some previous encounter and they address each other with friendly satire. This entire story is found in Gui's vida, with the exchange of coblas appended to it in manuscript H.

According to Alfred Jeanroy, Raimon de las Salas composed a partimen with Bertran, who proposed the dilemma: who are better at making war, feasts, and gifts, the Lombards or Provençals? Raimon praises his compatriots and puts down Lombard women as big and ugly. Linda Paterson, however, does not identify Raimon's interlocutor, who is known only as Bertran, with Folco d'Avinhon.

== Sources ==
- Egan, Margarita (1984). The Vidas of the Troubadours. New York: Garland. ISBN 0-8240-9437-9.
- Guida, Saverio (1972). "Per la biografia di Gui de Cavaillon e di Bertran Folco d’Avignon." Culture neolatina, 32, pp. 189–210.
- Guida, Saverio (2002). Premessa all’edizione in linea della tenzone fra Gui de Cavaillon e Bertran Folco d’Avignon (192.2, 83.2)
- Jeanroy, Alfred (1934). La poésie lyrique des troubadours. Toulouse: Privat.
- Paterson, Linda M. (1993). The World of the Troubadours: Medieval Occitan Society, c. 1100–c. 1300. Cambridge: Cambridge University Press. ISBN 0-521-55832-8.
