= Aicart =

Aicart is a given name and a surname with both Spanish and French origin. Notable people with the name include:

- Aicart or Aycart del Fossat (fl. 1250–68), Occitan troubadour
- José Manuel Pérez-Aicart (born 1982), Spanish auto racing driver
- Pepe Aicart (born 1986), Spanish footballer
