= Albertet =

Albertet is the Occitan diminutive of Albert (given name). It is commonly associated with two troubadours:

- Albertet Cailla
- Albertet de Sestaro (an unqualified "Albertet" usually means this troubadour)

== See also ==
- Albert
- Alberte
