= Vida (Occitan literary form) =

Vida: short biography Occitan literary form

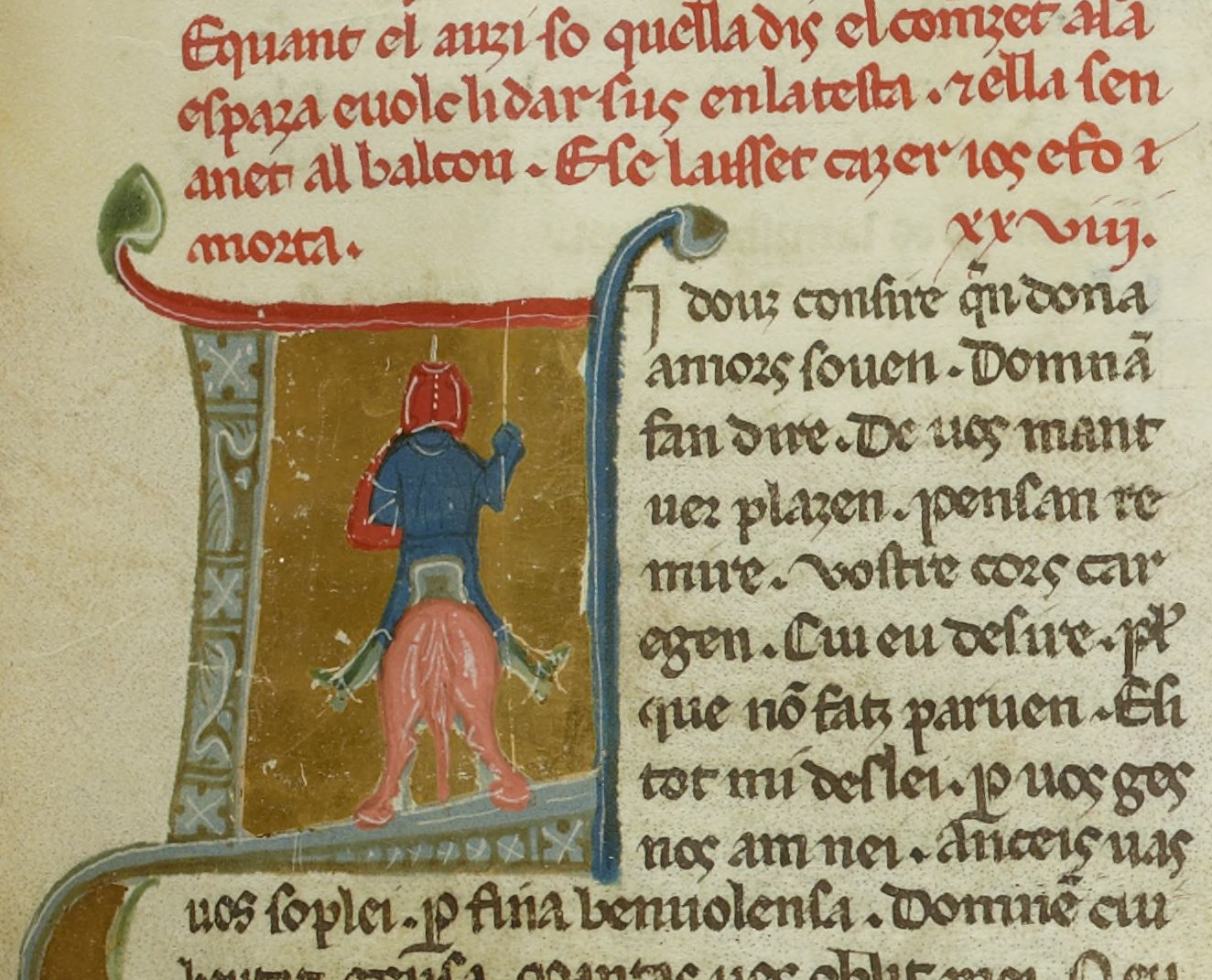
An illustration of Guillem de Cabestany accompanies his vida in the chansonnier. He is apparently leaving.

Vida (Old Occitan: [ˈvida]) is the usual term for a brief prose biography, written in Old Occitan, of a troubadour or trobairitz.

The word vida means "life" in Occitan languages; they are short prose biographies of the troubadours, and they are found in some chansonniers, along with the works of the author they describe. Vidas are notoriously unreliable: Mouzat, while complaining that some scholars still believe them, says they represent the authors as "ridiculous bohemians, and picaresque heroes"; Alfred Jeanroy calls them "the ancestors of modern novels". Most often, they are not based on independent sources, and their information is deduced from literal readings of the poems details. Most of the vidas were composed in Italy, many by Uc de Saint Circ.

Additionally, some individual poems are accompanied by razos, explanations of the circumstances in which the poem was composed.

== Troubadours with vidas ==
- Albert Malaspina
- Albertet Cailla
- Albertet de Sestaro
- Alfonso II of Aragon
- Almucs de Castelnau
- Aimeric de Belenoi
- Aimeric de Peguilhan
- Aimeric de Sarlat
- Arnaut de Meruoill
- Azalais de Porcairagues
- Beatritz de Dia
- Berenguier de Palazol
- Bertolome Zorzi
- Bernart de Ventadorn
- Bertran d'Alamanon
- Bertran de Born
- Bertran de Born lo Filhs
- Bertran del Pojet
- Blacasset
- Blacatz
- Cadenet
- Castelloza
- Cercamon
- Dalfi d'Alvernha
- Daude de Pradas
- Elias Cairel
- Elias Fonsalada
- Enric de Rodes
- Ferrari da Ferrara
- Folquet de Marselha
- Folquet de Romans
- Garin d'Apchier
- Garin lo Brun
- Gaucelm Faidit
- Gausbert Amiel
- Gauseran de Saint Leidier
- Gui de Cavalhon
- Gui d'Ussel
- Guillem Ademar
- Guillem Augier Novella
- Guillem de Balaun
- Guillem de Berguedà
- Guillem de Cabestany
- Guillem Figueira
- Guillem Magret
- Guillem de Montanhagol
- Guillem de Peiteus
- Guillem Rainol d'At
- Guillem de Saint Leidier
- Guillem de la Tor
- Guiraudo lo Ros
- Guiraut de Bornelh
- Guiraut de Calanso
- Guiraut de Salignac
- Iseut de Capio
- Jaufre de Pons
- Jaufre Rudel
- Jausbert de Puycibot
- Jordan Bonel
- Lanfranc Cigala
- Lombarda
- Marcabru
- Maria de Ventadorn
- Monge de Montaudon
- Peire d'Alvernhe
- Peire Bremon lo Tort
- Peire de Bussignac
- Peire Cardenal
- Peire Guillem de Tolosa
- Peire de Maensac
- Peire de la Mula
- Peire Raimon de Tolosa
- Peire Rogier
- Peire de Valeira
- Peire Vidal
- Peirol
- Perdigon
- Pistoleta
- Pons de Capduoill
- Raimbaut d'Aurenga
- Raimbaut de Vaqueiras
- Raimon de Durfort
- Raimon Jordan
- Raimon de Miraval
- Raimon de las Salas
- Rainaut de Pons
- Ricau de Tarascon
- Rigaut de Berbezilh
- Tibors de Sarenom
- Tomier and Palaizi
- Sail d'Escola
- Savaric de Mauleon
- Sordello
- Turc Malec
- Uc de la Bacalaria
- Uc Brunet
- Uc de Mataplana
- Uc de Pena
- Uc de Saint Circ

== Sources ==
There is a complete collection of vidas, with French translation and commentary, by Boutière and Schutz.

- Biographies des troubadours, edd. and trans. J. Boutière and A.-H. Schutz. Paris: Nizet, 1964.

There is a complete collection of English translations available as part of the Garland Library of Medieval Literature, Series B, translated by Margarita Egan.

- The Vidas of the Troubadours, ed. and trans. Margarita Egan. New York: Garland, 1984. ISBN 0-8240-9437-9.
