= O Teatro dos Vampiros =

Single by Legião Urbana

from the album V
- Released: 1991
- Genre: Alternative rock, Folk Rock
- Length: 3:37
- Label: EMI-Odeon
- Composers: Renato Russo, Marcelo Bonfá, Dado Villa-Lobos
- Producer: Mayrton Bahia

Legião Urbana singles chronology
"1965 (Duas Tribos)" (1989)	"O Teatro dos Vampiros" (1991)	"Vento no Litora" (1991)

"O Teatro dos Vampiros" (trans. "The Theater of Vampires") is a song by the Brazilian rock band Legião Urbana. It was originally released in 1991 as the first single of the 1991 album V.

It was the biggest hit of this album, between the 100 most played songs in Brazil, it was placing 27º in this list. This song later appeared on the collection Música P/ Acampamentos and also on the album Acústico MTV.
