= Raimon de Durfort and Turc Malec =

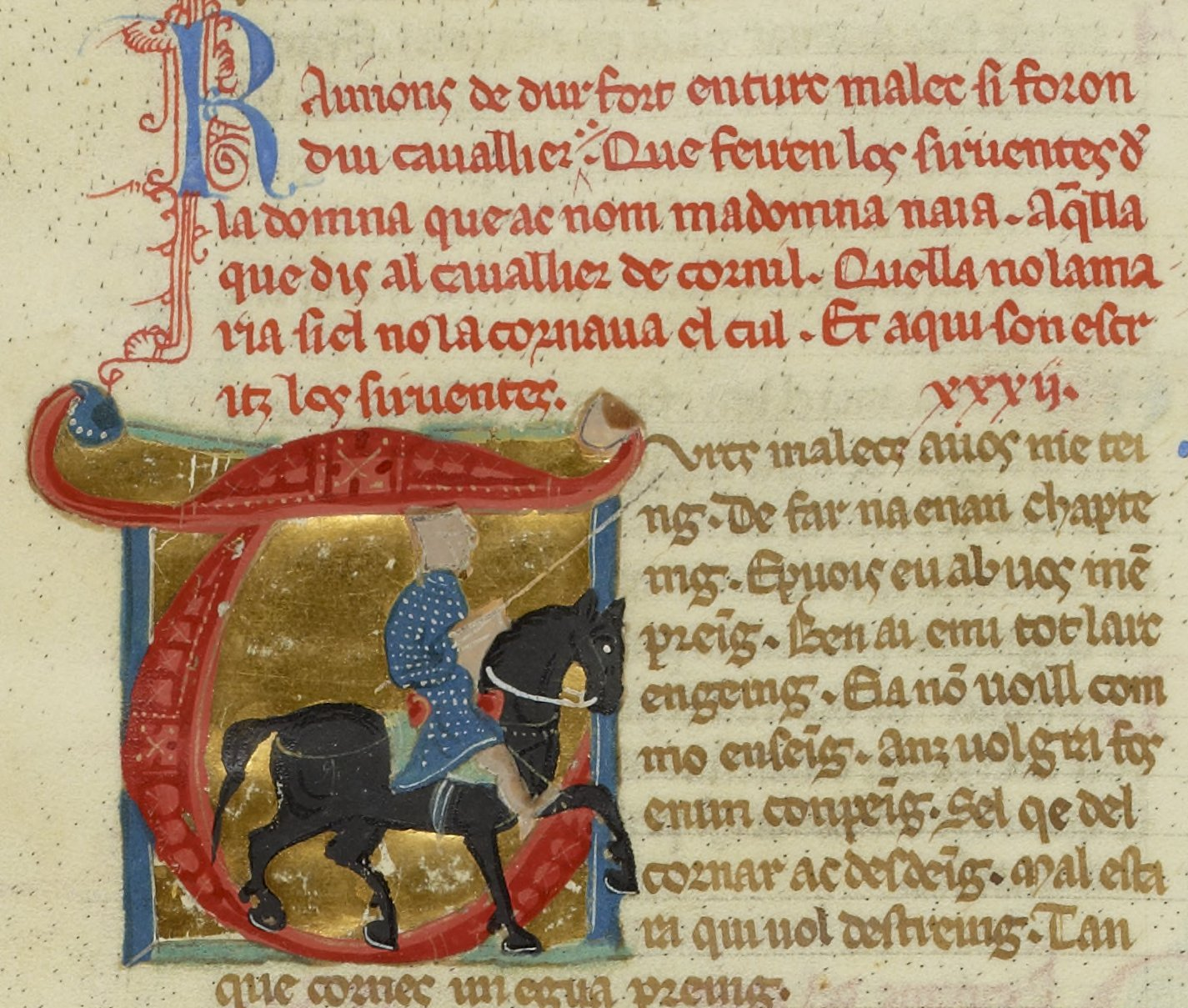
The red text of Raimon and Turc's vida above an image of a knight, from a 13th-century chansonnier

Turc Malec (also Turc Malet, Truc Malet, Truc Malec) was a minor troubadour and nobleman, probably from Quercy. He wrote the cobla esparsa En Raimon, be.us tenc a grat, the first (but the order is unclear) in a series of four poems (the other three being sirventes), constituting a debate with Raimon de Durfort (also from Quercy), and Arnaut Daniel. All three sirventes were written in monorhyming stanzas of nine lines, the first two of seven syllables and the last seven of eight, mirroring the structure of Turc's single one.

A vida-razo was composed for Raimon and Turc, which goes like this:

Raimons de Dufort e·N Turc Malec si foron du cavallier de Caersi que feiren los sirventes de la domna que ac nom ma donna n'Aia, aquella que dis al cavalier de Cornil qu'ella no l'amaria si el no la cornava el cul. Et aqui son escritz los sirventes.

Raimon de Durfort and Lord Turc Malec were two knights from Quercy who composed the sirventes about the lady called Milady Aia, the one who said to the knight of Cornil [possibly Bernart de Cornil, but actually a play on cornar, "to sound a horn"] that she would not love him if he did not blow in her arse. And here are written the sirventes.

In the poem, however, Aia (who is referred to as "Ena" in the pieces) does not ask to be "blown" in the cul (arse) but in the corn (literally "horn"). This may be a reference to the anal sphincter (which can make noise like a horn) or to the clitoris. Although Ugo Angelo Canello proposed in 1883 that the vida contains a concealed reference to homosexual sex (taking cornava for "sodomised"), today scholars believe it is either referring to typical vaginal sex or, insultingly, to oral stimulation of the anus; most scholars assume the latter.

== Sources ==
- Bibliografia Elettronica dei Trovatori, v. 2.0
