= Ricau de Tarascon =

Occitan poet

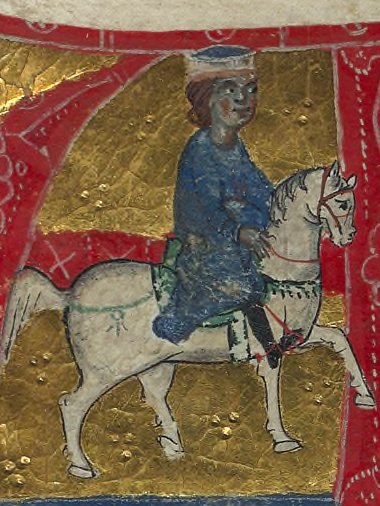
Ricau de Tarascon

Ricau de Tarascon (also spelled Ricautz or Ricavi) was a Provençal knight and troubadour from Tarascon, active between 1200 and 1240. He served Count Raymond Berengar V of Provence as an administrator.

His vida portrays him as a good "servant" of ladies. He wrote both sirventes and cansos, but only two songs survive. "Ab tan de sen cum Deus m'a dat", a canso, is accepted by scholars to be his and is generally ascribed to him in the chansonniers, although it is also ascribed to Gui de Cavalhon and Aimeric de Peguillan. Ricau knew Gui personally, since together they composed a tenso (debate poem), "Cabrit, al mieu vejaire", in which Gui is called "Cabrit". (Note: Chansonniers Da, I and K assign it to Ricauz de tarascon ... guis de cauaillon explicitly, while C names the authors Cabrit and Ricau.) The tenso is jocular in tone. Its poetic structure is borrowed from a song of Perdigon's that was also reused by Joan Esteve.

== Sources ==
- Egan, Margarita, trans. (1984). The Vidas of the Troubadours. New York: Garland. ISBN 0-8240-9437-9.
- Guida, Saverio. (1987). "La tenzone fra Ricau de Tarascon e ‘Cabrit’." Cultura Neolatina, 47, pp. 197–221. Re-published in Miscellanea di studi in onore di Aurelio Roncaglia a cinquant’anni dalla sua laurea (Modena, 1989), pp. 637–661.
