= Guillem de Balaun =

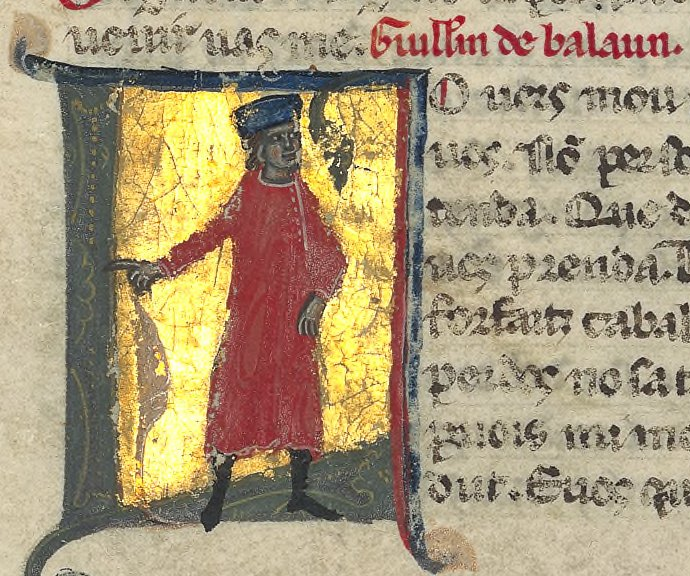
Guilhem de Balaun

Guillem (or Guilhem) de Balaun (fl. bef. 1223) was the castellan of Balazuc and a troubadour from the region around Montpellier. In his vida, which has the characteristics of a razo because it sets the background for the song Lo vers mou mercejan vas vos, he is described as "learned" (adretz).

== Vida ==
His vida is long and detailed, narrating the Guillem's love story. Guillem fell in love with Guilhelma, wife of Peire, lord of Jaujac (Javiac). He sang and talked for her and she said and did all that would please him. Guillem's friend, the troubadour Peire de Barjac, also loved a lady of Jaujac, Vierneta (or Uiernetta), probably the historical Vierna d'Anduza, wife of Raimon I of Gauges. He served her as a knight and she gave him all the love he wanted. Eventually Vierneta dismissed him on bad terms. He wandered about in a doleful with Guillem consoling him and promising to reconcile him to Vierneta when he next returned to see Guilhelma. After a long time he returned, did reconcile Peire and Vierneta, and gave Peire more joy than he had felt even when he first won his lady.

In order to test whether or not the joy of recovering a lady was greater than that of winning her, Guillem acted as though he were very angry with her. He ceased to discuss her or hear her discussed, to send her messages, or to visit her region. She sent him pleading messengers and letters of love, but he refused to receive them, "foolishly" in the eyes of his biographer. On hearing this, Guilhelma was saddened and sent messengers to determine in what way she could make amends. Guillem did not receive the messengers kindly and sent them back with word that her fault was unpardonable. At this she stopped sending him messages and fell into deep sadness; Guillem began to doubt the wisdom of his test. So he travelled to Jaujac by horse, on pretense of a pilgrimage, and stayed in a burgher's house. At night he was visited by Guilhelma and her lady-in-waiting, but when Guilhelma tried to kiss him he beat her until she fled the house. At this she resolved never to see him again.

Guillem then repented of his stupidity and went to the castle asking for a pardon so that he could explain why he had been so foolish, but Guilhelma rather had him thrown out. For the next year she refused to see him or hear about him, and he composed her a song begging forgiveness. He had the poem brought to her by "Bernart d'Anduza" (Bernard VII of Anduze, died 1223), an honoured baron of the region and a mutual friend. Bernard begged her to pardon him and to take revenge on him and she relented. She agreed to pardon him if he would pull out the fingernail of his longest finger and bring it to her. Upon learning of this, he immediately had his finger bled and de-nailed. He and Bernard brought the fingernail to her and they were reconciled.
