= Peire de Corbiac =

Peire de Corbiac or Corbian was a Gascon cleric and troubadour of the thirteenth century. His most famous works are a religious piece, the Prière à la Vierge (prayer to the Virgin), and his "treasures", Lo tezaurs (c. 1225).

Peire was born at Corbiac near Bordeaux to a poor family. He was educated at Orléans in the Scholastic tradition. His nephew was the troubadour Aimeric de Belenoi, whose vida refers to him as maestre (master, teacher) and Peire elsewhere calls himself maistre. Certainly Peire's Tezaur is didactic in nature: his purpose in writing was to convince the wise that though he was poor in material terms he was richer still. Composed in 840 alexandrines, the Tezaur is an encyclopaedic compilation of all that the troubadour knew. The work displays a great breadth of knowledge. He expends 547 lines narrating the chief events of the Old and New Testaments, then discusses the seven liberal arts, medicine, surgery, necromancy, mythology, the lives of the ancient Greeks and Romans, and those of the contemporary French and English.

Peire was familiar with the work of Venerable Bede, of John de Holywood, and of Chrétien de Troyes. He also provides the modern historian with several pieces of crucial information not found elsewhere. He refers to dancing the Sanctus, Agnus, and the Cunctipotens, showing that the liturgy was performed. The Tezaur also contains the first mention of contrapointamens, a century before its appearance in Latin as contrapunctus, today's counterpoint. The Tezaur had a lasting influence in the Late Middle Ages. The Jew Emanuele da Roma wrote the Ninth Meḥabbereth, a Hebrew poem based on the Tesoretto of Brunetto Latini, itself based on the Tezaur of Peire.

Peire was a religious man, as the dedicatory first verse of his Tezaur attests: it contains a dedication to Jesus and Mary and a statement of Trinitarian faith:

Domna, rosa ses espina, sobre totas flors olens, verga seca frug fazens, terra que ses labor grana, estela, del solelh maire, noirissa del vostre paire, el mon nulha no.us semelha ni londana ni vezina. Domna, verge pura e fina, ans que fos l'enfantamens, et apres tot eissamens, receup en vos carn humana Jesu Crist, nostre salvaire, si com ses trencamen faire intra.l bels rais, quan solelha, per la fenestra veirina. Domna, estela marina de las autras plus luzens, la mars nos combat e.l vens; mostra nos via certana; car si.ns vols a bon port traire non tem nau ni governaire ni tempest que.ns destorbelha ni.l sobern de la marina.	Lady, rose without thorn, sweet above all flowers, dry rod bearing fruit, earth bringing forth fruit without toil, star, mother of the sun, nurse of thine own Father, in the world no woman is like to thee, neither far nor near. Lady, virgin pure and fair before the birth was and afterwards the same, received human flesh in thee Jesus Christ our Saviour, just as without causing flaw, the fair ray enters when the sun shines through the window-pane. Lady, star of the sea, brighter than the other stars, the sea and the wind buffet us; show thou us the right way: for if thou wilt bring us to a fair haven, ship nor helmsman fears not tempest nor tide lest it trouble us.

== Sources ==
- Aubrey, Elizabeth (1989). "References to Music in Old Occitan Literature." Acta Musicologica, 61:2 (May–Aug.), pp. 110–149.
- Aubrey, Elizabeth (1996). The Music of the Troubadours. Indianapolis: Indiana University Press. ISBN 0-253-21389-4.
- Chaytor, Henry John (1912). The Troubadours. Cambridge: Cambridge University Press.
- Egan, Margarita, ed. and trans. (1984). The Vidas of the Troubadours. New York: Garland. ISBN 0-8240-9437-9.
- Paris, Gaston (1912). Melanges de litterature français du moyen âge. New York: Burt Franklin. ISBN 0-8337-4311-2.
- Jeanroy, Alfred, and Bertoni, Giulio (1911). "Le Thezaur de Peire de Corbian." Annales du Midi, 23, 289–308 and 451–71.
- Léglu, Catherine E. (2005). "The Two Versions of Peire de Corbian's Thezaur." Études de langue et de littérature médiévales, offertes à Peter T. Ricketts à l'occasion de son 70ème anniversaire. Brepols: Turnhout. ISBN 2-503-51640-8.
- Sacerdote, Gustavo. "The Ninth Mehabbereth of Emanuele da Roma and the Tresor of Peire de Corbiac." The Jewish Quarterly Review, 7:4 (July, 1895), pp. 711–728.
