= Uc de Lescura =

Uc de Lescura or de l'Escura (fl. 1190–1204) was a minor troubadour. The Lescura of his birth is unknown. There is a Lescurre in Ariège, Aveyron, and Tarn. Based on references in his work, historian Alfred Adler placed him at the court of Alfonso VIII of Castile (whom he calls "emperor") and in Catalonia.

Uc's only existing work is a sirventes, "De mots ricos no tem Peire Vidal", that begins with a gab proclaiming his superiority to eight of his contemporary troubadours: Peire Vidal, Albertet de Sestaro, Perdigon, and Aimeric de Peguilhan, as well as the otherwise unknown Arnaut Romieu, Gualaubert, and Pelardit. The rest of the poem is a ferocious attack on the morals of the baronage in the manner of Marcabru. The rime, metre, and melody of the work are copied entirely from a work of Peire Vidal, "Anc no mori per amor ni per al".
