= Peire de Barjac =

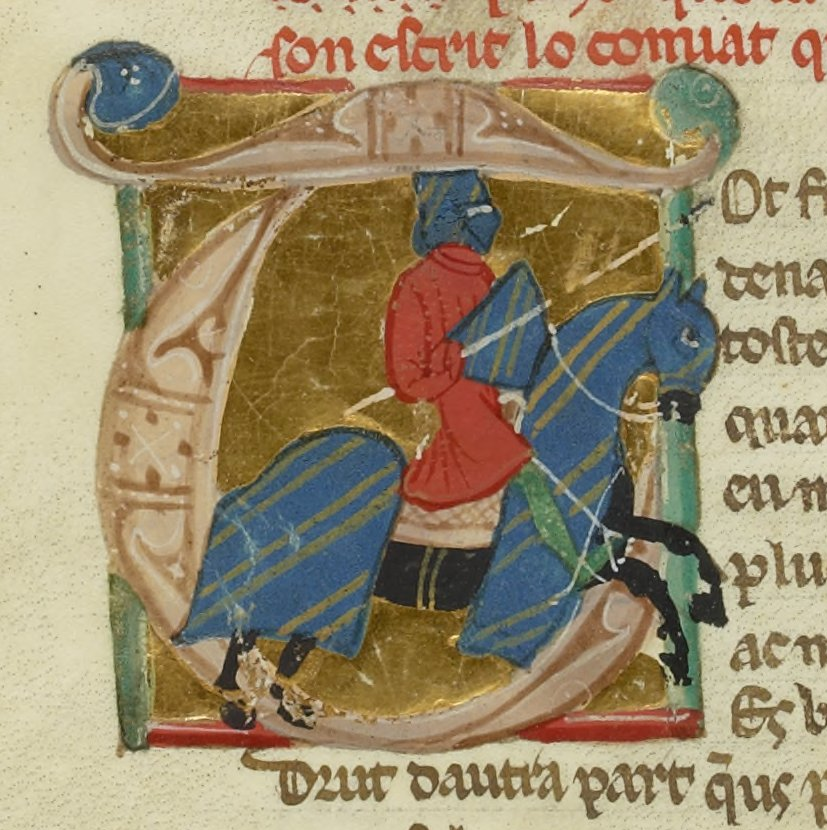
Peire, from a 13th-century chansonnier

Peire de Barjac was a Languedocian troubadour who flourished in the first half of the thirteenth century. He was a descendant of the troubadours Guillem de Randon and Garin lo Brun.

Only one of poem that was certainly written by Peire survives: "Tot francamen, domna, veing denan vos". The rubric above the poem in the manuscript labels it a conjat and scholars have classified it as a mala canso, or bad canso. It is a song about leaving his lover.

Many other songs are attributed to multiple troubadours in the manuscripts. Some attributed to Peire are also attributed to Peire de Bussignac, Berenguier de Palazol, Elias de Barjols, Guillem de la Tor, Pons de Capdoill and Uc de Saint Circ; yet few of these other attributions are reliable. One song attributed to Peire in one manuscript is unattributed in another. Stronski argues that the attribution to Elias de Barjols was an emendation by the scribe confronted with the unfamiliar name Peire de Barjac. Napolski considered the attribution to Pons de Capdoill dubious. Alfred Jeanroy refuted the attribution to Uc de Saint Circ.

== Bibliography ==
- Napolski, Max von. Leben und Werke des Trobadors Pons de Capduoill. Halle: Niemeyer, 1879.
- Stronski, Stanislaw. Le troubadour Elias de Barjols. Toulouse: Privat, 1906.
