= Girard Cavalaz =

Italian composer

Girardo Cavallazzi or Cavallazzo (Occitan: Girard or Girart Cavalaz; fl. 1225–1247) was an Italian troubadour from Lombardy. His only surviving work is four coblas of a partimen he exchanged with Aycart del Fossat concerning the nature of Heaven and Hell: Si paradis et enfernz son aital.

Girard's identity was unknown for many years because only his Occitan Christian name (a common one) was given in the London manuscript (Br. Mus. Harley 3041) from which his work was known. However, the discovery of documents in the Biblioteca Civica in Bergamo showed Girard to have been a "Cavalaz", probably a member of the Cavallazzi family of Novara. Indeed, a Girardo Cavallazzi is recorded in Novarese documents beginning in 1225. He was console del comune in 1227 and 1230 and console di giustizia in 1247. According to the Annales Placentini Gibellini, his family was Ghibelline in sympathy.

The Bergamasque manuscript contains a Latin rubric explaining the argument (razo) of the partimen between Girard and Aycart.

== Sources ==
- Bertoni, Giulio (1915). I Trovatori d'Italia: Biografie, testi, tradizioni, note. Rome: Società Multigrafica Editrice Somu.
