= Gab (song) =

A gab or gap (Old Occitan: [ˈɡap], "boast") is a troubadour boasting song. It is often considered related to the tenso and partimen, two types of debate poem. Sometimes the gab is not considered a separate genre of poetry but simply a boast found within another genre, commonly the sirventes.

The Occitan word gab means "boast" and comes from the verb gabar (to open the mouth wide, i.e. gape). The song is innately competitive and the boast is often presented as a challenge, which may generate poetical responses. The boasting, however, is made in good fun and typically follows a formula ensuring it will be well-received (unlike a real boast). Often it is heavily ironic, and the boasts are intended specifically to entertain the audience that knows better.

The first gab was "Ben vuelh", composed by William IX of Aquitaine (died 1126). The sirventes "De mots ricos no tem Peire Vidal" by Uc de Lescura begins with a gab proclaiming the composer's superiority to eight of his contemporary troubadours, including the man of the title, Peire Vidal, who was himself a famous composer of gabs. One of his works opens:

Drogoman senher, s'ieu agues bon destrier, en fol plag foran intrat tuich mei guerrier: qu'acqui mezeis quant hom lor mi mentau mi temon plus que cailla esparvier, e non prezon lur vida un denierm tan mi sabon fer e salvatg'e brau.	Lord Interpreter, if I had a good war-horse, my enemies would be in difficulty: for no sooner had they heard the mention of my name they would fear me more than the quail fears the hawk, and they would value their life no more than a farthing, for they would know how fierce, wild and ferocious I am.
