= Albertet de Sestaro =

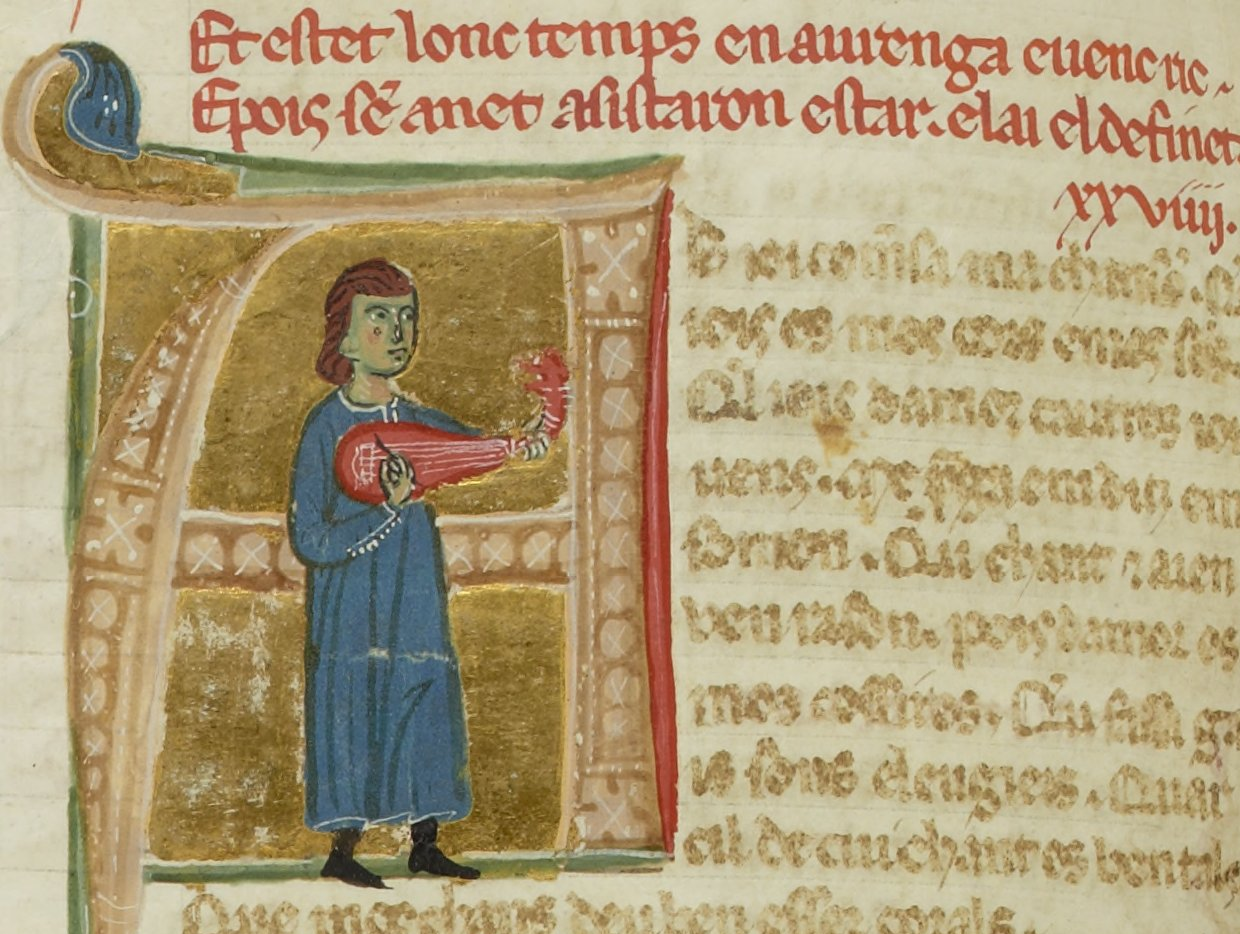
Albertet playing a lute

Albertet de Sestaro, sometimes called Albertet de Terascon (fl. 1194–1221), was a Provençal jongleur and troubadour from the Gapençais (Gapensés in Occitan). Of his total oeuvre, twenty three poems survive. "Albertet" or "Albertetz" is the Occitan diminutive of Albert. Unqualified, it usually refers to Albertet de Sestaro, but there was an Albertet Cailla.

According to his vida he was the son of a noble jongleur named Asar, one of whose pieces may survive. Albertet was reputed for his voice and for the innovative melodies of his short cansós, but not for his lyrics. Fellow troubadour Uc de Lescura praised Albertet's votz a ben dir ("well-spoken-of voice"). He was a welcomed performer and conversationalist in court society. Much of his life was spent at Orange, where he grew wealthy before moving to Lombardy, where he remained from 1210 to 1221. In Italy he frequented the courts of Savoy, Montferrat, Malaspina, Genoa, and the Este in Ferrara. At the Este court he probably came into contact with Guillem Augier Novella, Aimeric de Pegulhan, and Aimeric de Belenoi. He also travelled west of Provence as far as Montferrand, where he met Dalfí d'Alvernha, Gaucelm Faidit, and Peirol, and by some accounts he even took refuge in Spain at some point. Eventually he returned to Sisteron in the Forcalquier, where he died.

One of Albertet's most famous works is a satire which heaps praise on seven prominent women of his time, notably Beatrice of Savoy, wife of Raymond Berengar IV of Provence. There is also a tensó between Albertet and Aimeric de Pegulhan: N'Albertz, chausetz a vostre sen. This tensó is evidence that Albertet called himself Albert, though later scribes usually employed the diminutive. Albertet also composed a tenso with Aimeric de Belenoi. He praised Augier and Gaucelm Faidit, and he honoured Peirol by name in one tornada:

Peirol, violatz e chantatz cointamen
de ma chanzon los motz e·l son leugier

Translation:

Peirol, fiddle and sing my song gracefully,
the words and the light melody.

Asides from this request to Peirol, Albertet elsewhere begged his lady to learn his poems, possibly with an eye to the propagation through further singing and recitation:

Despite his reputation as a musician, only two of his surviving works—the Mos coratges m'es camjatz and A! mi no fai chantar foilla ni flors (both cansós)—have complete melodies, though one other (En mon cor ai un' aital encobida) is partially extant. There is another piece, a descort entitled Bel m'es oimais, which does not survive with music in its only manuscript but which might have been the model for the strophic lai Bel m'est li tans of the trouvère Colin Muset. Another trouvère, Mahieu le Juif, was probably influenced by a piece of Albertet's in composing the text for his song beginning Par grant. Each piece of Albertet's surviving musical work is distinct, though on the whole it is conservative, written within one tenth interval, syllabic with melismas only at the ends of phrases. Mos coratges is conventional but ornate; En mon cor appears to have been through-composed; and A! mi no fai chantar is complex and subtle, written in a simple style, but with unique intervals and phrasing.

== Sources ==
- Aubrey, Elizabeth. The Music of the Troubadours. Indiana University Press, 1996. ISBN 0-253-21389-4.
- Egan, Margarita, ed. and trans. The Vidas of the Troubadours. New York: Garland, 1984. ISBN 0-8240-9437-9.
- Falck, Robert. "Mahieu le Juif." Grove Music Online. Oxford Music Online. Accessed 20 September 2008.
- Falvy, Zoltán. "La cour d'Alphonse le Sage et la musique européenne." Studia Musicologica Academiae Scientiarum Hungaricae, 25, Fasc. 1/4. (1983), pp. 159–170.
- Jeanroy, Alfred (1898). "Une imitation d'Albert de Sisteron par Mahieu le Juif," Archived 2011-06-12 at the Wayback Machine Romania, 27, with an image of MS R 4,4 fol. 227ro Archived 2011-06-12 at the Wayback Machine from the Biblioteca Estense in Modena.
- Lewent, Kurt. "Old Provençal Miscellany." The Modern Language Review, 38:2 (Apr., 1943), pp. 106–116.
- Parker, Ian R. "Albertet de Sestaro", Grove Music Online ed. L. Macy, <http://www.grovemusic.com Archived 2008-05-16 at the Wayback Machine>
- Shepard, William P. "Two Provençal Tenzoni." Modern Philology, 23:1 (Aug., 1925), pp. 17–28.
