= Jaujac =

- Commune
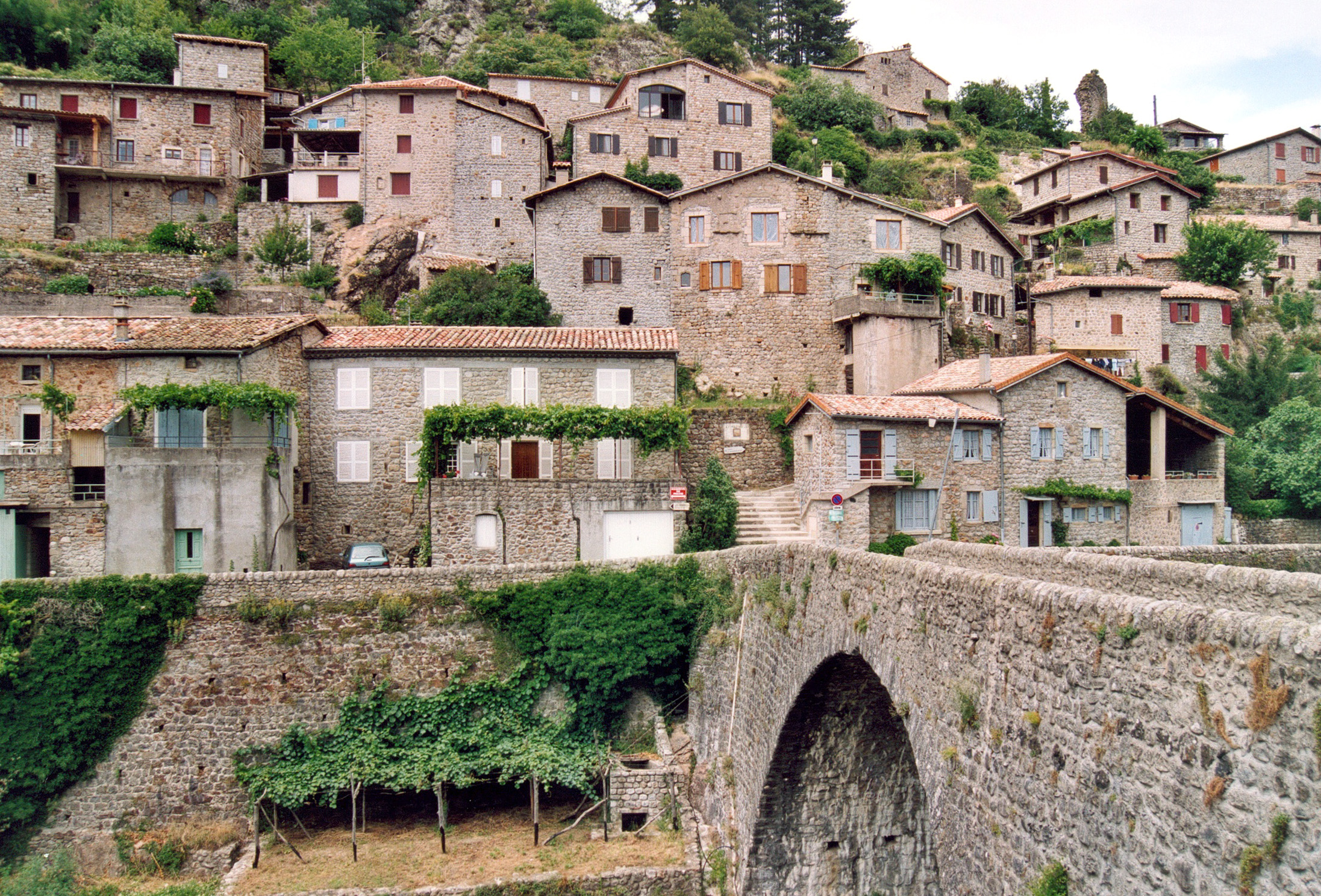
- A view of Jaujac, from adjacent to the bridge

- Coat of arms
- Location of Jaujac
- Location within France Location within Auvergne-Rhône-Alpes
- Coordinates: 44°38′16″N 4°15′25″E
- Country: France
- Region: Auvergne-Rhône-Alpes
- Department: Ardèche
- Arrondissement: Largentière
- Canton: Haute-Ardèche

Government
  - Mayor (2020–2026): Marion Houetz
- Area^{1}: 24.27 km^{2} (9.37 sq mi)
- Elevation: 404 m (1,325 ft)
- Highest elevation: 1,207 m (3,960 ft)
- Lowest elevation: 332 m (1,089 ft)
- Population (2023): 1,199
  - Density: 49.40/km^{2} (128.0/sq mi)
- Time zone: UTC+01:00 (CET)
  - Summer (DST): UTC+02:00 (CEST)
- INSEE/Postal code: 07107 /07380
- ^{1} French Land Register data, which excludes lakes, ponds, glaciers > 1 km^{2} (0.386 sq mi or 247 acres) and river estuaries.

Jaujac (French pronunciation: [ʒoʒak]) is a commune in the Ardèche department in southern France.

It was the site of the love story of Guillem de Balaun, the historicity of which is dubious.

== Geography ==
The village lies in the northeastern part of the commune, on the right bank of the river Lignon, which flows northeast through the commune.

== Population ==
Historical population
Year	Pop.	±% p.a.
1968	1,093	—
1975	1,077	−0.21%
1982	1,085	+0.11%
1990	1,020	−0.77%
1999	1,065	+0.48%
2007	1,181	+1.30%
2012	1,170	−0.19%
2017	1,228	+0.97%
2023	1,199	−0.40%
Source: INSEE

== See also ==
- Communes of the Ardèche department
