= Péguilhan =

- Commune
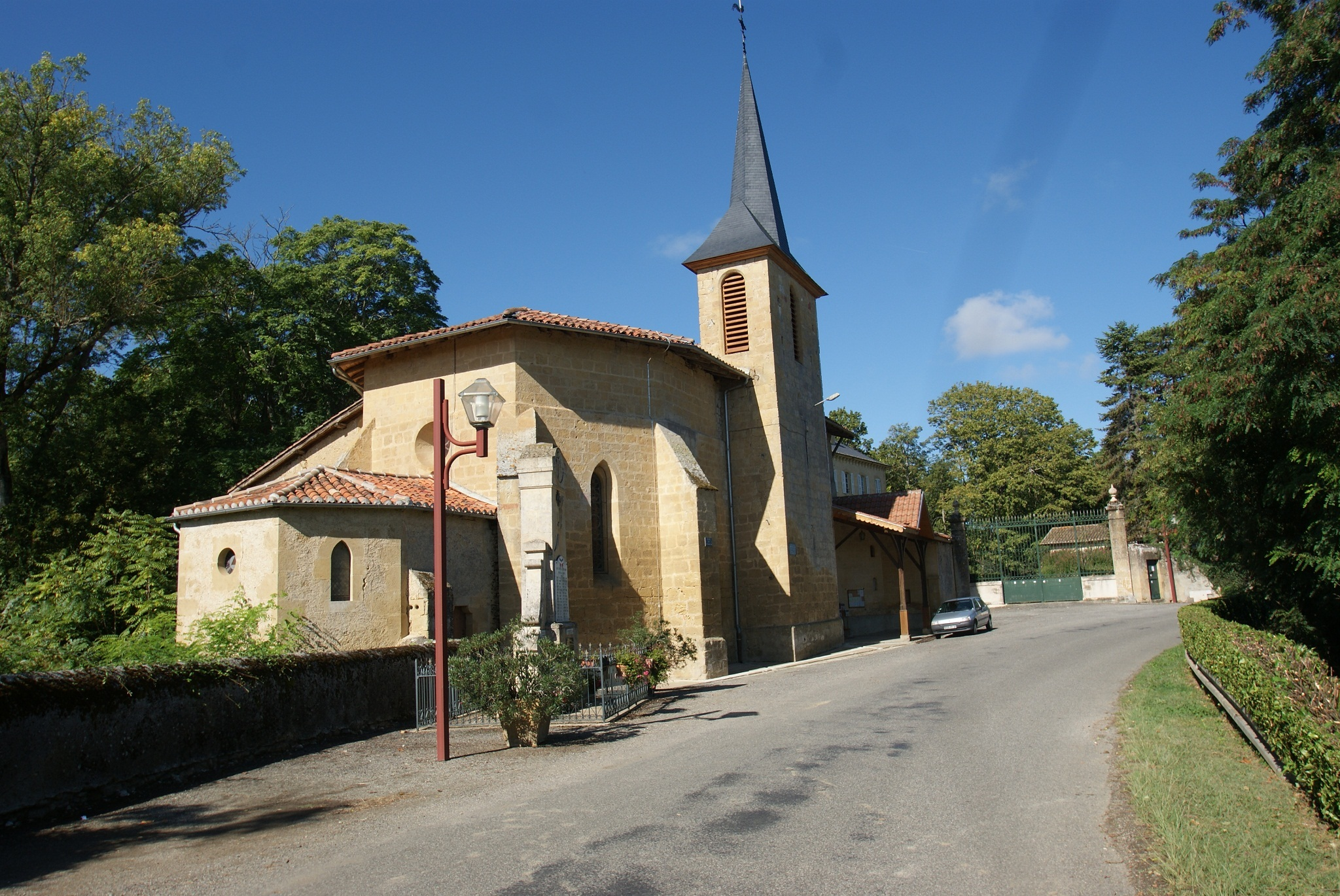
- The church in Péguilhan

- Coat of arms
- Location of Péguilhan
- Location within France Location within Occitanie
- Coordinates: 43°18′54″N 0°42′29″E
- Country: France
- Region: Occitania
- Department: Haute-Garonne
- Arrondissement: Saint-Gaudens
- Canton: Saint-Gaudens

Government
  - Mayor (2020–2026): Céline Laurenties Barrere
- Area^{1}: 23.58 km^{2} (9.10 sq mi)
- Elevation: 347 m (1,138 ft)
- Highest elevation: 345 m (1,132 ft)
- Lowest elevation: 218 m (715 ft)
- Population (2023): 274
  - Density: 11.6/km^{2} (30.1/sq mi)
- Time zone: UTC+01:00 (CET)
  - Summer (DST): UTC+02:00 (CEST)
- INSEE/Postal code: 31412 /31350
- ^{1} French Land Register data, which excludes lakes, ponds, glaciers > 1 km^{2} (0.386 sq mi or 247 acres) and river estuaries.

Péguilhan is a commune in the Haute-Garonne department in southwestern France in the historical region of Gascony. On 1 January 2017, the former commune of Lunax was merged into Péguilhan.

Péguilhan has far-reaching views towards the Pyrenees. It is surrounded by woodland and open countryside and a mixture of arable and livestock farming. Some houses in the area have been bought by British incomers, although the majority in recent times have been Dutch and German.

== Population ==
Historical population
Year	Pop.	±% p.a.
1968	438	—
1975	339	−3.59%
1982	323	−0.69%
1990	299	−0.96%
1999	277	−0.85%
2007	288	+0.49%
2012	307	+1.29%
2017	286	−1.41%
2023	274	−0.71%
Source: INSEE

== Personalities ==
It was possibly the birthplace of Aimeric de Peguilhan, a medieval troubadour, although this is debated.

== Geography ==
The river Gesse flows northwards through the commune towards the market town of Boulogne-sur-Gesse; the Gimone forms most its western border.

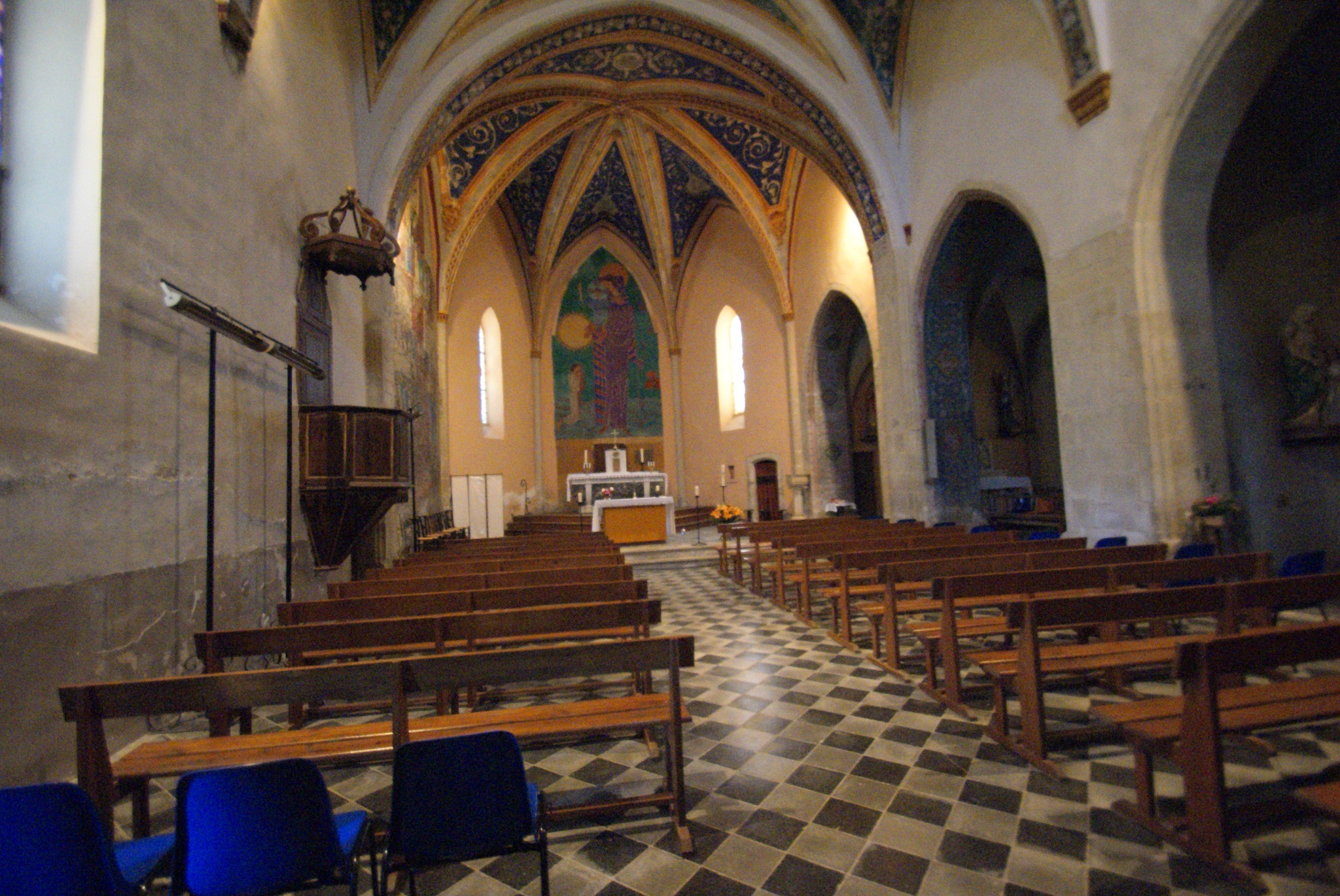
Interior of the church

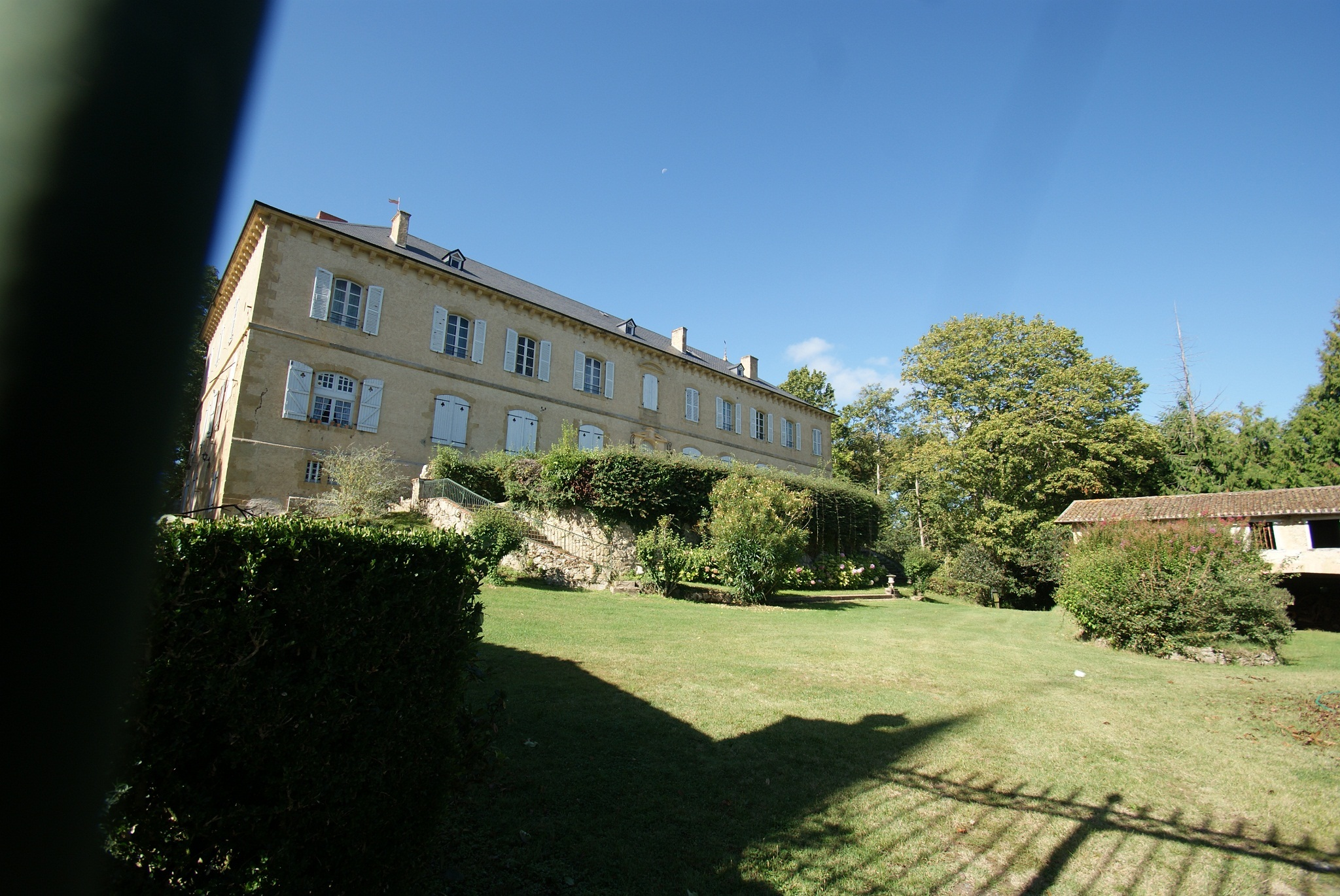
Château de Villeneuve

== Literature ==
Péguilhan is the setting for Martin Calder's travel memoir A Summer in Gascony, about life on a farm with a local Gascon family, centred on the inn at the end of the village. The book is set in the early 1990s and was published in 2008 by Nicholas Brealey publishing.

== See also ==
- Communes of the Haute-Garonne department
