= Lunax =

- Part of Péguilhan
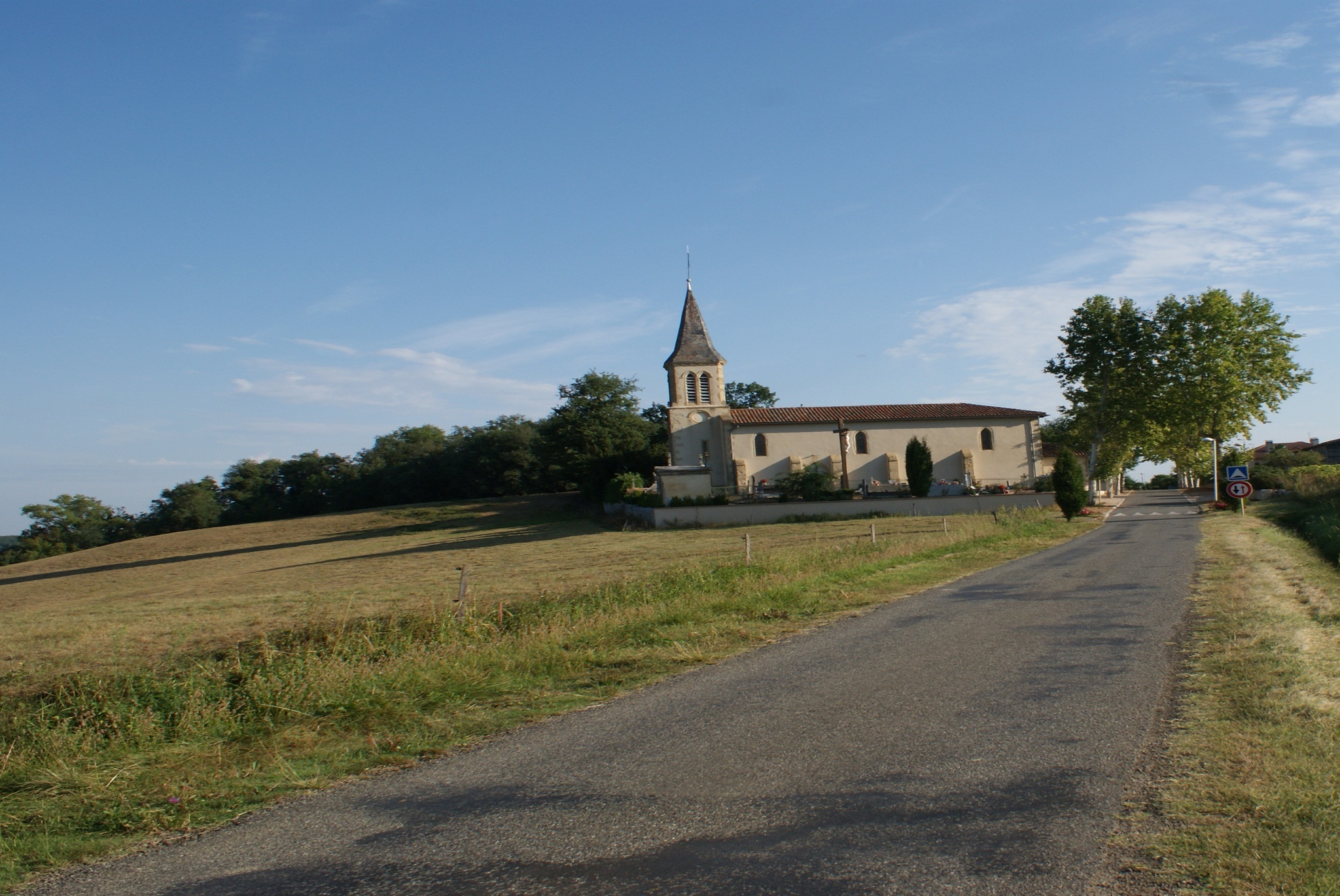
- Location of Lunax
- Location within France Location within Occitanie
- Coordinates: 43°20′25″N 0°41′16″E
- Country: France
- Region: Occitania
- Department: Haute-Garonne
- Arrondissement: Saint-Gaudens
- Canton: Saint-Gaudens
- Commune: Péguilhan
- Area^{1}: 5.1 km^{2} (2.0 sq mi)
- Elevation: 295 m (968 ft)
- Highest elevation: 298 m (978 ft)
- Lowest elevation: 217 m (712 ft)
- Population (2022): 60
  - Density: 12/km^{2} (30/sq mi)
- Time zone: UTC+01:00 (CET)
  - Summer (DST): UTC+02:00 (CEST)
- Postal code: 31350
- ^{1} French Land Register data, which excludes lakes, ponds, glaciers > 1 km^{2} (0.386 sq mi or 247 acres) and river estuaries.

Lunax (Gascon: Lunats or Lunacs) is a former commune in the Haute-Garonne department in southwestern France. On 1 January 2017, it was merged into the commune Péguilhan.

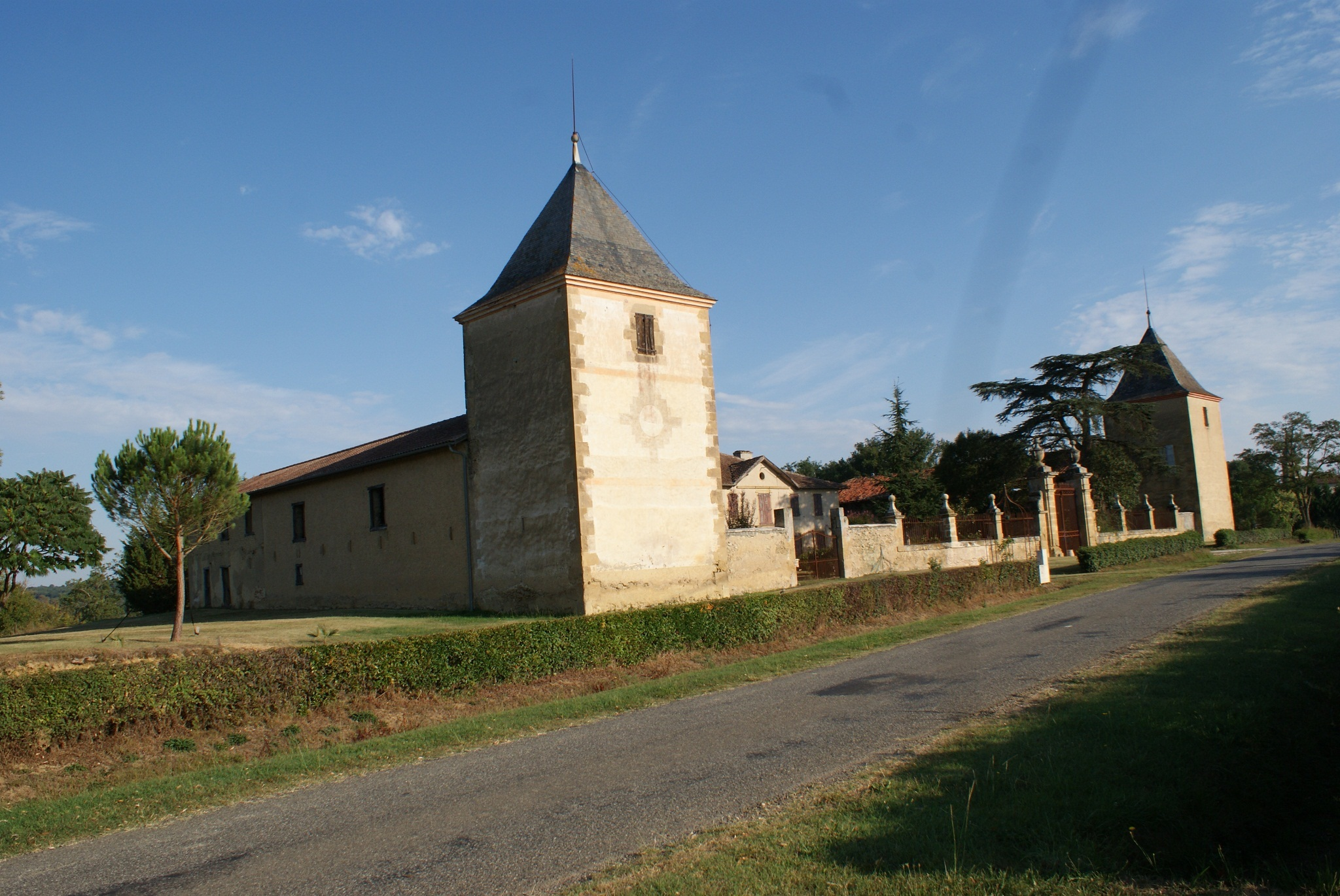
Château de Lunax

== Geography ==
The river Gesse forms all of the commune's eastern border; the Gimone forms all of its western border.
