= Alba (poetry) =

Genre of Old Occitan lyric poetry

The alba (Old Occitan: [ˈalba]; "sunrise") is a genre of Old Occitan lyric poetry. It describes the longing of lovers who, having passed a night together, must separate for fear of being discovered.

A common figure found in the alba is the guaita ("sentry" or "guard"), a friend who alerts the lovers when the hour has come to separate. The lovers often accuse the guaita of dozing, being inattentive or separating them too early. The lovers fear not just the lady's husband but also the lauzengiers, the jealous rival.

The following example, composed by an anonymous troubadour, describes the longing of a knight for his lady as they part company after a night of forbidden love. Though generally representative of the style, this particular verse uses an atypical strophic pattern.

Quan lo rosinhols escria
ab sa part la nueg e.l dia,
yeu suy ab ma bell'amia
jos la flor,
tro la gaita de la tor
escria: "Drutz, al levar!
Qu'ieu vey l'alba e.l jorn clar.

Translation:

While the nightingale sings,
both night and day,
I am with my beautiful
beneath the flowers,
until our sentry from the tower
cries: "Lovers, get up!
for I clearly see the sunrise and the day.

Under the influence of the Occitan troubadours, the Minnesingers developed a similar genre, the Tagelied, in Germany, and in northern France the trouvères developed an equivalent aube genre. The alba itself was imported into the Galician-Portuguese trovadorismo movement, but only one example of it, by Nuno Fernandes Torneol, survives.

In 1263, as a counterpart to the alba, Guiraut Riquier composed a song he called a serena (evening song), in which a lover complains about waiting for the evening.

== List of Occitan albas ==
Only 18 albas are known.

Composer	Incipit	Type	Notes
Bernart de Venzac	Lo Paire el Filh el sant Espirital	religious	
Raimbaut de Vaqueiras	Gaita be gaiteta del castel	profane	
Guiraut de Bornelh	Reis glorios, verais lums e clartatz	profane	
Folquet de Marselha	Vers Dieus el vostre nom e de Sainta Maria	religious	
Cadenet	S'anc fui belha ni prezada	profane	
Raimon de las Salas	Deus aidatz	profane	
Bertran d'Alamanon or Gaucelm Faidit	Us cavalier si jazia	profane	
Guilhem d'Autpol	Esperansa de totz ferms esperans	religious	
Guiraut Riquier	Ab plazer	profane	
Guiraut Riquier	Qui vuelha ses plazer	religious	
Uc de la Bacalaria	Per grazir la bon'estrena	profane	
Peire Espanhol	Ar levatz sus, franca cortesa gen	religious	
Anonymous	En un vergier, sotz folha d'albespi	profane	
Anonymous	Ab la gensor que sia	profane	
Anonymous	Quan lo rossinhol escria	profane	cobla esparsa
Anonymous	Drutz que vol dreitamen amar	profane	cobla esparsa
Anonymous	Eras airay co que·us dey dir	profane	
Cerveri de Girona	Aixi com cel c'anan erra la via	religious	

== See also ==
- Aubade
- Tagelied
