= Bertran del Pojet =

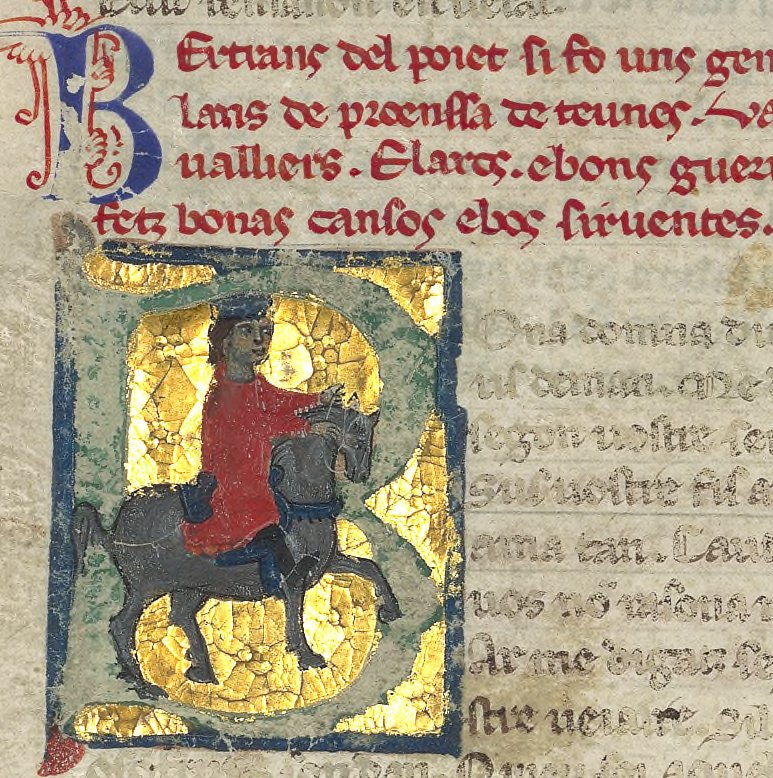
Bertrand del Pojet

Bertran del Pojet (fl. 1222) was a Provençal castellan and troubadour of the latter half of the thirteenth century, a period of Angevin rule in Provence and Italy.

He was born in Puget-Théniers, near Nice, and lived most of his life in Teunes, the region around Toulon. He first appears in documents in September 1222. His vida records that he was a valiant and generous knight and a skilled soldier. His cansos and sirventes were well-esteemed. Only two works of his survive, a sirventes and a tenso. Nonetheless, they were well known.

Bertran's tenso with an anonymous trobairitz, "Bona dompna, d'una re quieus deman", has been translated into English by Frank Chambers and Carol Jane Nappholz. Both his poems were first edited and published (in Italian) by C. de Lollis under the title "Bertran del Pojet, trovatore dell' età angioina" in Miscellanea in onore di Arturo Graf (Bergamo, 1903).

== Sources ==
- Egan, Margarita, ed. and trans. The Vidas of the Troubadours. New York: Garland, 1984. ISBN 0-8240-9437-9.
- Nappholz, Carol J. Unsung Women: The Anonymous Female Voice in Troubadour Poetry. New York: Peter Lang, 1994. ISBN 0-8204-2376-9.
- Vitaglione, Daniel. The Literature of Provence: An Introduction. McFarland and Company, 2000. ISBN 0-7864-0843-X.
