= Aimeric de Belenoi =

Gascon troubadour (floruit 1215–1242)

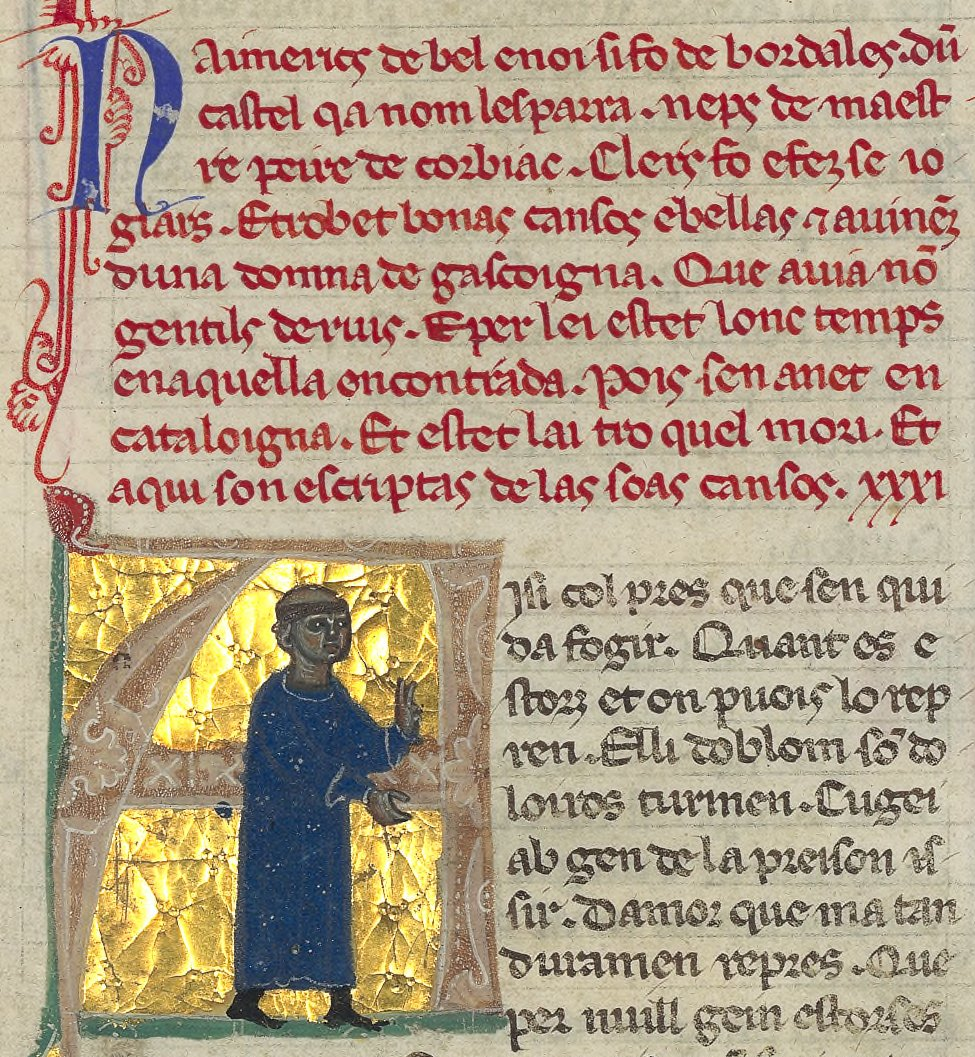
N'aimerics de belenoi si fo de bordales dun castel qa nom lesparra. . . "Sir Aimeric de Belenoi was from the Bordelais, from a castle called Lesparre. . ." In his picture he is portrayed tonsured, as a monk.

Aimeric de Belenoi (fl. 1215–1242) was a Gascon troubadour. At least fifteen of his songs survived. Seven others were attributed to him in some medieval manuscripts.

== Early life ==
Aimeric was born in the castle of Lesparra in the Bordelais (metropolis civitas Burdigalensium, the modern Gironde). His uncle was another troubadour, Peire de Corbiac. His vida says he was a cleric and later a jongleur before he took to "inventing good songs, which were beautiful and charming." He apparently was the feudal lord of Belenoi, an unknown location.

== Career ==
The chief object of his songs was a lady named Gentil de Rieux (Gentilis de Gienciaco), a Gascon from Gensac-Saint-Julien and the wife of Raimon de Benque. His biographer records that he lingered in Gascony a long time "for her" before moving on to Catalonia, where he died.

Aimeric's poetry refers to events at Toulouse, Provence, and Italy, implying that he travelled. He was at the Este court in Ferrara in the 1210s, where he probably had contact with Aimeric de Pegulhan, Albertet de Sestaro, Guillem Augier Novella and Peirol. He may also have made the acquaintance of Peire Cardenal.

Aimeric went to Castile before making his final trip to Catalonia. His last datable work was Nulhs hom en res no falh, a planh for Nuño Sánchez, who died in 1242. This planh was addressed to the comtessa Beatris, wife of Raymond Berengar IV of Provence, and senher N'Imo, her brother Aimone, son of Thomas I of Savoy. Though the work is often ascribed to Raimbaut de Vaqueiras in the chansonniers, the reference to this pair and the style of the work, favour ascription to Aimeric. It is the only piece of work by Aimeric which survives with a melody, though that melody is ascribed (with the lyrics) in its lone manuscript to Peirol. The melody is through-composed.

Aimeric's verses were first collected by Maria Dumitrescu as Poésies du troubadour Aimeric de Belenoi and published at Paris in 1935. She criticised his work as "banal", but it enjoyed widespread popularity in the High Middle Ages, especially in Italy, and it is varied in its intertwining themes moral, religious, and amorous.

== Works ==
All twenty two works that are sometime attributed to Aimeric are listed below, alphabetically:

- Aissi quo'l pres que s'en cuja fugir
- Aissi cum hom pros afortitz
- Ara'm destrenh Amors
- Meravilh me cum pot hom apelhar
- No'm laissa ni'm vol retener
- Nulhs hom no pot complir adrechamen
- Per Crist s'ieu crezes Amor
- Pos Dieus nos a restaurat
- Puois lo gais temps de pascor
- Selh que promet a son coral amic
- S'a midons plazia
- Ailas per que viu lonjamen ni dura
- Domna, flor
- Anc, puois qe giois ni canc
- Tant es d'Amor honratz sos senhoratges
- A'l prim pres de'ls breus jorns braus
- Fins e leials e senes tot engan
- Ja non creirai q'afanz ni cossirers
- Nulhs hom en re no falh
- Pus de Joy mou e de Plazer
- Can mi perpens ni m'arbire
- Consiros, cum partitz d'amor

== Sources ==
- Aubrey, Elizabeth (1996). The Music of the Troubadours. Indiana University Press. ISBN 0-253-21389-4.
- Egan, Margarita, ed. and trans. The Vidas of the Troubadours. New York: Garland, 1984. ISBN 0-8240-9437-9.
- Gaunt, Simon, and Kay, Sarah (edd.) The Troubadours: An Introduction. Cambridge: Cambridge University Press, 1999. ISBN 0-521-57473-0.
