= Guiraudo lo Ros =

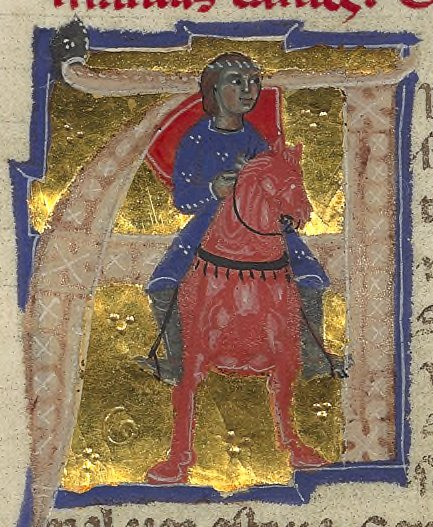
Giraudo on a red horse, from a 13th-century manuscript

Guiraudo lo Ros or Guiraudet le Roux (meaning "the redhead" or "the blonde") was a troubadour from Toulouse of a poor family of knightly rank. According to his vida he travelled to the court of his lord, called Count Alfonso, probably a reference to either Alfonso Jordan or his son, another Alfonso. At court he fell in love with Alfonso's daughter, which experience taught him how to compose songs. Only eight of his songs (seven cansos and one partimen) survive, the most famous being En greu pantais.
