= V (Legião Urbana album) =

Studio album by Legião Urbana
- Released: December 15, 1991
- Recorded: October/December 1991
- Genres: Alternative rock; art rock; progressive rock
- Length: 49:37
- Label: EMI-Odeon
- Producer: Mayrton Bahia

Legião Urbana chronology
As Quatro Estações (1989)	V (1991)	Música P/ Acampamentos (1992)

Singles from V
- 1. "O Teatro dos Vampiros" Released: 1991; 2. "Vento no Litoral" Released: 1991

V is the fifth studio album by the Brazilian rock band Legião Urbana, released on December 15, 1991.

The album was released amid the Plano Collor economic crisis and an alcoholism peak of vocalist, acoustic guitarist and leader Renato Russo, who had also just discovered to be HIV-positive - a condition he kept as a secret from most people back then. It sold around 465,000 copies.

== Background ==
The album was released as then Brazilian president Fernando Collor was implementing the measures of his Plano Collor, which limited citizens' financial power. The band was still touring for their previous album, As Quatro Estações, and the shows became even more important in order to allow them to retrieve the money they lost.

Meanwhile, Russo went to rehab, concerned with the example he was setting to his son Giuliano, born in 1989. There, he discovered he had the HIV virus. That prompted him to meet with the band's manager Rafael Borges and ask him to arrange everything after his death.

Aside from these two problems, the band experienced conflicts with Jorge Davidson, national artistic manager of p. It all started when Davidson insisted that they recorded one of their shows of the As Quatro Estações tour. When he finally got what he wanted, Borges asked him to send the material to PolyGram, where the band's longtime producer, Mayrton Bahia, was working. Davidson refused stating the band never cared about EMI's material, which made Russo furious. Davidson ended up not effectively participating in the album, despite being credit as artistic manager. Later, working for Sony Music, Davidson said he understood Russo's frustration. Having just been diagnosed as HIV-positive, Russo didn't know if he would live to see a live album by his band.

Working for a rival label, Bahia wasn't expected to produce V, but Russo still invited him after meeting him by chance at a Fernanda Abreu show.

== Recording ==
For the first time, the band did not use EMI-Oden studios to create the album. They opted for Estúdio Mega, instead. The studio was also located in Rio de Janeiro and, unlike in EMI's one, they weren't able to stay there for as long as they wanted, nor did they have exclusive use of it. They hired a session bassist, Bruno Araújo, who was already performing live with them. However, he wouldn't perform in the subsequent tour due to a fight with session acoustic guitarist Fred Nascimento. They were both close, but the fall out cost their jobs as Legião Urbana's session members.

It was on this album that Bahia managed to convinced Russo to switch his Roland Juno-106 keyboard for other models, in order to create new sounds.

== Content ==
=== Music and lyrics ===
"Vento no Litoral"
from the album V. Recorded in 1991.

V has been labeled a progressive rock effort. When asked about how the album would be like, Russo said in an interview: "Oh, there are some medieval things, some instrumentals. The first side is a trip. They'll be saying like: 'Legião repeats formula and releases progressive album (laughs)...'". In another interview, this one to Zeca Camargo on MTV in 1993, Russo said that "what we wanted to pass on to V was boredom and stagnation. That album was made slow on purpose".

The first track, "Love Song", is a love cantiga in Galician-Portuguese, composed in the 13th century by Nuno Fernandes Torneol. "Metal Contra as Nuvens" is divided in four parts and is 11:28 long, being the band's longest track ever. A part of it was recorded at the PolyGram studios, with 40 session musicians hired to play 12 violins, four violas and four cellos. "A Ordem dos Templários", which includes a section of "Douce Dame Jolie", by Guillaume de Machaut, from the 14th century, pays tribute to the knights who protected Christians during the Crusades.

On Acústico MTV, Russo explains that the song "O Teatro dos Vampiros" should speak about television. On the same live album, he said he had found out that the Italian city of Venice was known as "Sereníssima" only after he composed the song of same name.

=== Cover art ===
Russo wanted the moon-star on the cover and the "V" letter on the backcover to be embossed in a golden color, but Ronaldo Vianna, then product manager of EMI-Odeon, said that it would be too expensive in an economic conjuncture that required costs cuts and that the label's marketing consultancy disapproved the budget. Russo insisted and the cover was done the way he wanted.

== Promotion and tour ==
"I remember that, up to the third song, I couldn't hear a single note. It was all screams, screams, screams. The audience was in catharsis, total bliss. I had never seen anything like that. It took me a while to focus."

— Carlos Trilha about his first show ever with Legião Urbana, in Uberlândia.

This album, unlike the others, had no promotional videos, a product that the members disliked. Instead, the band accepted MTV's invitation to record their Acústico MTV in January 1992 using the album's repertoire. some of the songs were released on the compilation album Música P/ Acampamentos, in 1992, while the Acústico MTV show would only be released in 1999.

Following Araújo's and Nascimento's dismissals, the band had to look for new touring musicians. Keyboardist Mú Carvalho also quit the band due to scheduling conflicts. This paved the way for the arrival of Sérgio Serra (acoustic guitar), Tavinho Fialho (bass guitar) and, following a suggestion by Carvalho himself, Carlos Trilha (keyboards).

The tour was a short one, however, because Russo was taking drugs in excess, which generated conflicts with his bandmates Dado Villa-Lobos (guitar) and Marcelo Bonfá (drums). The situation culminated in the premature and abrupt end of the tour. Música P/ Acampamentos was released as part of a set of efforts to compensate for the fans' frustration. Following this event, Russo began his treatment and began to take AZT, besides attending Alcoholics Anonymous sessions.

== Track listing ==
All tracks are written by Dado Villa-Lobos, Renato Russo, Marcelo Bonfá except where noted

No.	Title	Title translation in English	Length
1.	"Love Song" (contains a section of "Cantiga de Amor", by Nuno Fernandes Torneol)		1:17
2.	"Metal contra as Nuvens"	Metal against the Clouds	11:29
3.	"A Ordem dos Templários" (instrumental)	Order of the Templars	4:29
4.	"A Montanha Mágica"	The Magic Mountain	7:46
5.	"O Teatro dos Vampiros"	The Theater of Vampires	3:38
6.	"Sereníssima"	Most Serene	4:03
7.	"Vento no Litoral"	Wind at the Coastline	6:05
8.	"O Mundo Anda Tão Complicado"	The World's Been So Complicated	3:43
9.	"L'Âge d'Or"	The Golden Age	5:07
10.	"Come Share My Life" (instrumental; American traditional)		2:00
Total length:			49:37

== Personnel ==
Legião Urbana

- Renato Russo — vocals, rhythm guitar and keyboards
- Dado Villa-Lobos — lead guitar
- Marcelo Bonfá — drums and percussion

Additional personnel

- Bruno Araújo — bass guitar

== Sales and certifications ==
Country	Certification	Sales
Brazil (Pro-Música Brasil)	Platina	465.000+
