= Gui de Cavalhon =

Provençal nobleman

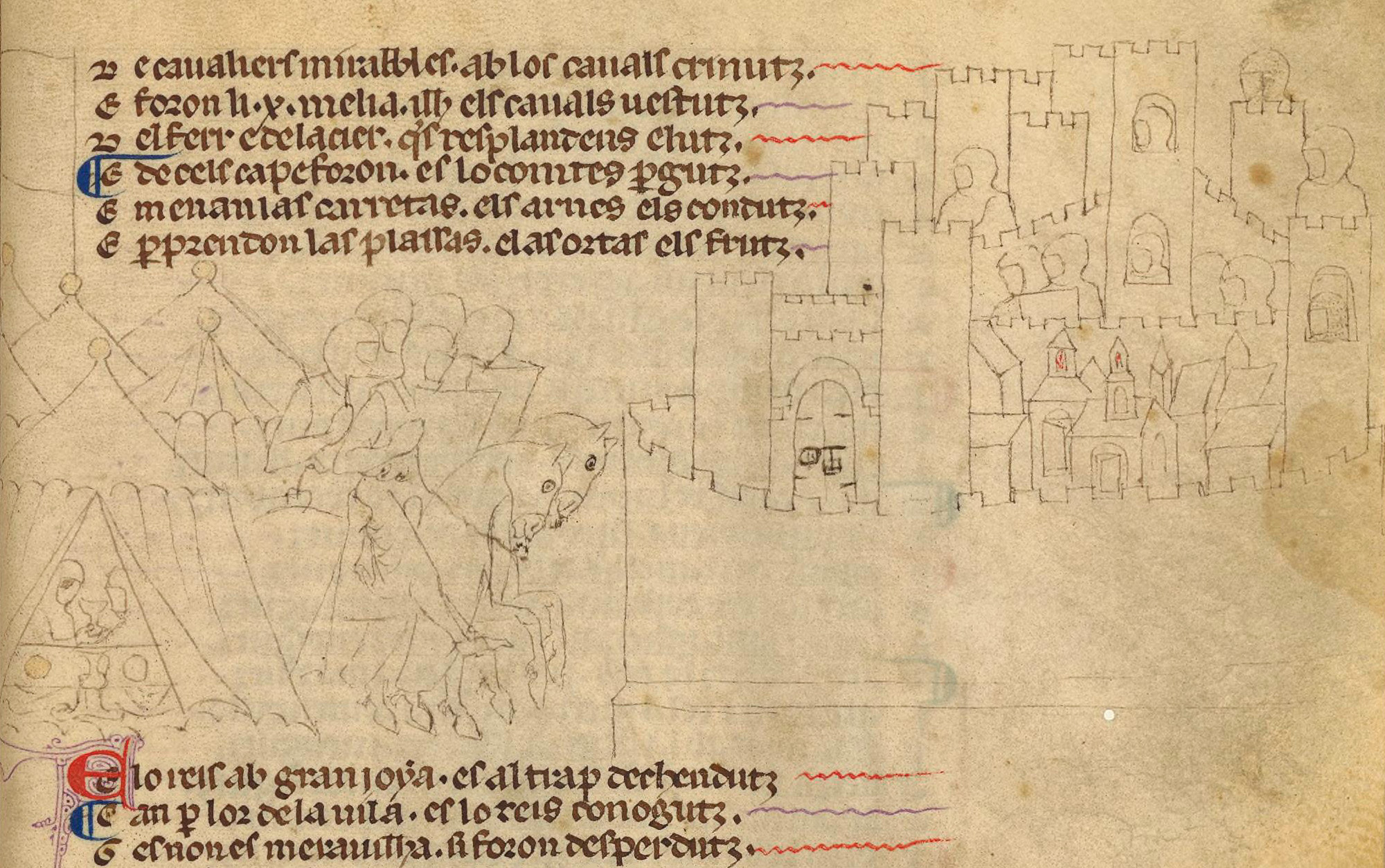
Louis VIII of France taking Marmande, from the sole surviving manuscript of the Song of the Albigensian Crusade. Recent studies have proposed Gui de Cavalhon as the author of the second part of the Song.

Gui de Cavalhon, Cavaillo, or Gavaillo (fl. 1200–1229) was a Provençal nobleman: a diplomat, warrior, and man of letters. He was probably also the Guionet who composed tensos and partimens with Cadenet, Raimbaut de Vaqueiras, Mainart Ros, Pomairol, and a certain Guillem.

== Knight and nobleman ==
Gui was born at Cavaillon in the Valclusa, though there is no evidence of him residing there. He is first encountered at the court of Alfonso II of Provence in 1200–07. In 1204 he was present at the marriage of Alfonso's elder brother, Peter II of Aragon, and Maria of Montpellier. Beginning in 1209 he was in the service of Raymond VI of Toulouse fighting the Albigensian Crusade. In 1215 he accompanied Raymond to the Fourth Lateran Council. In 1216–17 he was fighting in Provence, where he was a counsellor of Raymond Berengar IV. In 1220 he was besieged in Castel-Nou, now Castèlnòu d'Arri (Castelnaudary), by Amaury de Montfort. He later entered the Templar Order and became a counsellor of Raymond VII. For Raymond he led an embassy to Pope Honorius III and in 1225 he was rewarded with the title of viscount of Cavaillon. Gui was last mentioned in 1229.

== Literature ==
Gui's career would have been little out of the ordinary for a 13th-century nobleman if not for his literary pursuits, for he was an accomplished troubadour in the Occitan language, leaving behind five or six lyric poems (or fragments), including a sirventes and several tensos. His fame as a troubadour was enough that a vida of his life, long by the genre's standards, survives. He is described in glowing terms as generous, courtly, charming, loved of the ladies and the people, a capable knight and warrior. Besides his surviving work, his biographer records his composition of coblas (couplets) about love and "conversation" (de solatz, perhaps signifying humour or pleasure).

=== Tensos ===
His earliest tenso was with an otherwise unknown "Falco", which can be dated to 1200–07 on the basis of a charge of Falco's that Gui lived off the gifts of his patron, Count Alfonso: Senh'En Guy, del comte, / don enquer vos sove, / N'Anfos vostre senhor, / don ac man palafre / ses fre vostra seror ("Lord Sir Guy, you receive gifts from the count, Sir Alfonso your lord, your sister gifts of palfreys without end"). The last part of this line is probably an obscene joke, alleging, with or without basis, that Gui's sister had a sexual relationship with Alfonso.

In 1215, on their way to IV Lateran, Gui and his Raymond VI composed a short partimen about the invasion of Raymond's land and the possible recovery of lost ground. In 1220 while besieged in Castèlnòu d'Arri he addressed a poem to Bertran Folcon d'Avignon which survives in its entirety appended to his vida. Gui also creatively composed a "tenso" with his own mantle.

Gui vies for the identity of the "Esperdut" (a senhal) who composed three poems: a canso, a partimen with Pons de Monlaur, and a sirventes. Gui has also been posited as the co-author of a tenso with Garsenda of Forcalquier, the wife of Alfonso II. His vida repeats the rumour (probably unfounded) that he was the countess' lover. In her tenso, after she declares her love for him, Gui responds courteously but carefully:

Bona dompna, vostr'onrada valors mi fai temeros estar, tan es granz, e no·m o tol negun'autra paors qu'eu non vos prec; que·us volria enanz tan gen servir que non fezes oltratge— qu'aissi·m sai eu de preiar enardir— e volria que·l faich fosson messatge, e presessetz en loc de precs servir: qu'us honratz faitz deu be valer un dir.	Good lady, it's your rank that makes me shudder, your high birth that thwarts my good intent— because of that alone I'm reticent. You know I'd rather serve you as a brother than do anything that would abuse you (you see, I do know how to state my case). If only deeds were messengers to you, and you accepted them in wooing's place: for noble deeds, as much as words, deserve your grace.

=== Sirventes ===
Gui's lone surviving sirventes was written against Guilhem dels Baus, who, in 1215, had been confirmed by Frederick II in the titles King of Arles and Vienne. The sirventes was probably written between Summer 1216 and Guilhem's death, in an Avignonese prison, in June 1218.

=== "Cabrit" ===
Since the early 19th century, the identity of Gui with the "Cabrit" of the poem Cabrit, al meu vejaire, written with Ricau de Tarascon, has been generally accepted. It found support among T. B. Eméric-David, Paul Meyer, Ludwig Selbach, Stanislaw Stronski, C. Fabre, Adolf Kolsen, Carl Appel, D. J. Jones, Martín de Riquer, Dietmar Rieger, Andrea Brusoni, and P. T. Ricketts. The identification has rested on the attribution in three chansonniers, called D, I, and K. The rubric in these works gives the author as Ricautz de Tarascon e.n Guis de Cavaillon: "Ricau de Tarascon and Lord Gui de Cavalhon". In all other cases where there is an onomastic difference between a tenso and the ascription of the chansonnier, the latter is known to be correct (or to have good reason for the attribution). Further, in manuscript C, where the attribution is simply Tenso d'en Cabrit e d'eu Ricau, it immediately precedes a selection of Gui's pieces that, in the same way, are assigned to Guionet and Esperdut, other nicknames Gui used.

Only Martín Aurell has strongly objected to the identification. He argues that Cabrit must have been a member of the urban noblesse of Arles and owner of a small parcel of land near Tarascon, documented in a notarial act of August 1203 at the house of Bertran Porcelet and probably dead by 1225. A Guillelmus Aldebertus Cabritus (Guillem Aldebert Cabrit) was a consul of Arles in 1197 and man known only as Cabritus was a consul in 1209. Guillem Aldebert Cabrit also witnessed the testament of Rostanh Porcelet in 1186 and an 1198 donation to the Knights Templar in Arles by the Porcelet family. That these figures named Cabritus all acted in the same geographical theatre (Arles) and in connexion with the family (Porcelet) over a period of thirty years suggests that it was a single individual of some prominence at Arles. That this figure held land at Tarascon strongly suggests that he may have been Ricau's interlocutor.

== Legacy and influence ==
Gui is a major figure in the Canso de la crosada. He is mentioned among the bravest and most loyal of the Count of Toulouse' followers. The author of the second part of the Canso puts an eloquent speech in Gui's mouth, in which he praises the Paratge (nobility) and denounces lo coms de Monfort que destrui los baros e la gleiza de Roma ("the count of Montfort who destroyed the barons and the Church of Rome"). The speech was delivered upon the return of Raymonds VI and VII to Toulouse on 12 September 1217. It was designed as an instructive word of wisdom from the aged Gui to the young Raymond VII.

Gui's largest influence on other poets, however, was his cultivation of Alexandrins, popular already in chansons de geste, such as Gui de Nanteuil. Subsequent authors in Occitan and Catalan called this type of poetry la tonada de Gui, el so de Gui Nantull (Ramon Muntaner), the son d'En Gui (Peire Bremon Ricas Novas), or the son de meser Gui (Uc de Saint Circ). It has been suggested that these references (or at least some of them) may refer not, as traditionally believed, to Gui de Nanteuil (Muntaner's usage being the obvious exception), but to Gui de Cavalhon.
