= Gausbert Amiel =

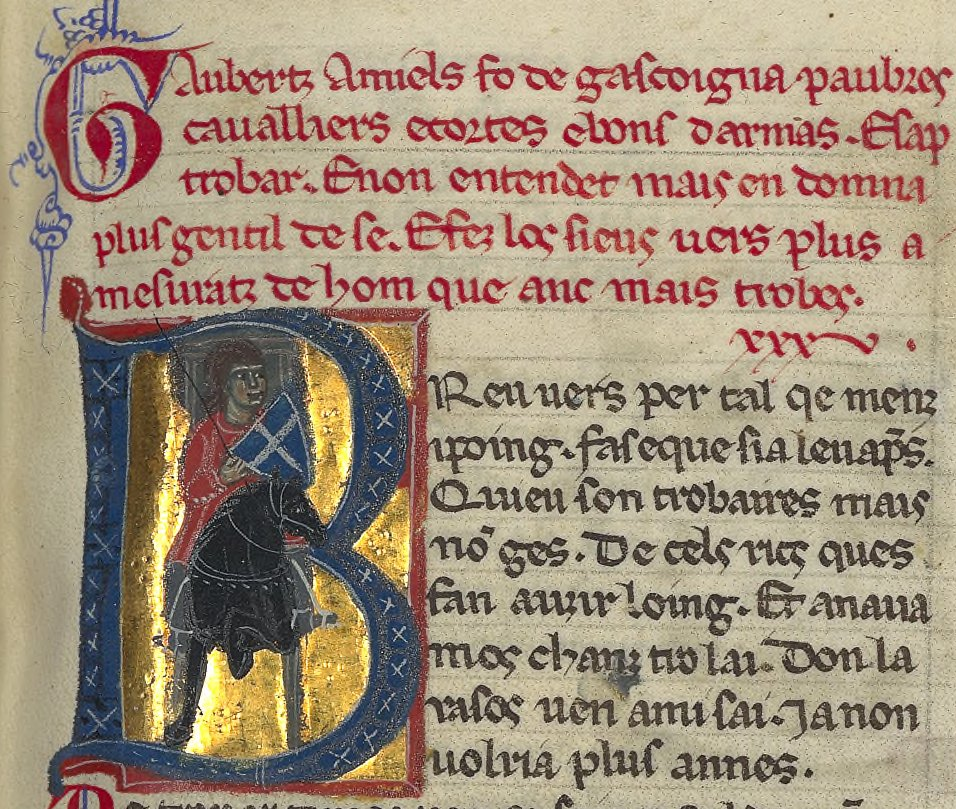
Gausbert the knight

Gau(s)bert Amiel or Gausbertz Amiels was a 13th-century Gascon troubadour. His only surviving song (canso) is Breu vers per tal que meins y poing, a humorous satire of contemporary courtly poetry. This lone example of Gausbert's work is well represented in the manuscripts, however, appearing six, labelled A, D, I, K, N, and V. The poem is only ascribed to him in MS "D", where a marginal note names "Gibert Amiels" as the author. Based on the manuscripts, the poem must have been written between 1200 and 1254.

All that is known of Gausbert that cannot be gleaned from his poem is found in his vida, which, however, seem to use, as its primary source, his poem. He is described as "a poor knight, courteous and skilled in arms", and "he never fell in love with a dame nobler than he". The purpose of his surviving poem is to attack the rics (rich men, implying nobility and rank as well as material wealth) and their pursuance of younger women, who are poor Gausbert's targets. There are affinities in content with the work of Marcabru.

== Sources ==
- Egan, Margarita (ed. and trans.) The Vidas of the Troubadours. New York: Garland, 1984. ISBN 0-8240-9437-9.
- Riquer, Martín de. Los trovadores: historia literaria y textos. 3 vol. Barcelona: Planeta, 1975.
