= Arnaut Daniel =

Occitan troubadour

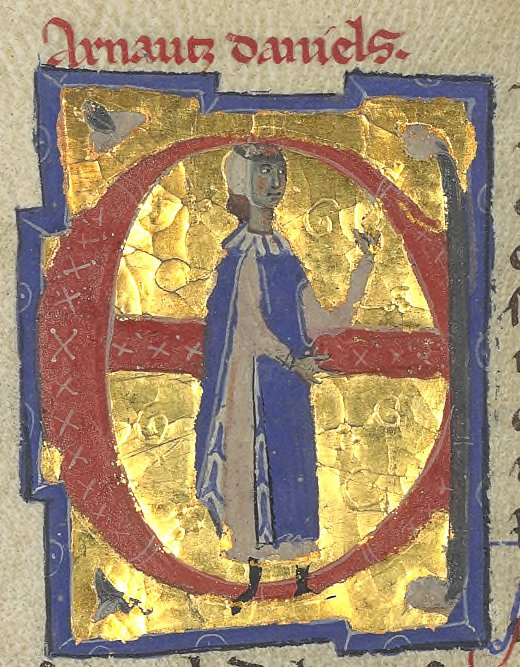

Background information
- Born: Ribérac, Périgord
- Origin: Occitania
- Occupation: Troubadour
- Years active: 1180-1200

Arnaut Daniel (Occitan: [aɾˈnawd daniˈɛl]; fl. 1180–1200) was an Occitan troubadour of the 12th century, praised by Dante as "the better craftsman" (miglior fabbro) and called a "grand master of love" (gran maestro d'amore) by Petrarch. In the 20th century he was lauded by Ezra Pound in The Spirit of Romance (1910) as the greatest poet to have ever lived.

== Life ==
According to one biography, Daniel was born of a noble family at the castle of Ribérac in Périgord; however, the scant contemporary sources point to him being a jester with pernicious economic troubles: Raimon de Durfort calls him "a student, ruined by dice and shut-the-box". His Vida, preserved in Troubadour Manuscript B, is as follows:

Arnautz Daniels si fo d’aquella encontrada don fo Arnautz de Maroill, de l’evescat de Peiregos, d’un chastel que a nom Ribairac, et fo gentils hom. Et amparet ben letras e deleitet se en trobar et en caras rimas, per que las soas chanssons non son leus ad entendre ni ad aprendre.Et amet una auta dompna de Gascoigna, moiller d’En Guillem de Buonvila, mas non fo crezut qez anc la dompna li fezes plazer en dreich d’amor. Per que el ditz: Eu sui Arnautz q’amas l’aura e caz la lebre ab lo boue nadi contra suberna.

"And Arnaut Daniel was from those areas from which was Arnautz de Maroill, of the bishopric of Peiregos, of a castle known by the name of Ribairac, and he was a gentleman. And he learned well how to read and write, enjoyed himself in 'trobar' in precious rhymes, and his songs are not easy to understand nor to learn. And he loved a noble woman of Gascony, wife of Sir Guillem de Buonvila, but it was not believed that she ever returned this love in a just way. And therefore he says: "I am Arnaut, who loves the wind and chases the hare with an ox, swims against the flood".

== Work and style ==
The dominant characteristic of Daniel's poetry is an extreme obscurity of thought and expression, a style called trobar clus ('hermetic verse'). He belonged to one school of troubadour poets that sought to make their meanings difficult to understand through the use of unfamiliar words and expressions, enigmatical allusions, complicated meters and uncommon rhyme schemes. Daniel further invented a form of stanza in which no lines rhymed with each other, finding their rhymes only in the corresponding line of the next stanza.

Daniel was the inventor of the sestina, a song of six stanzas of six lines each, with the same end words repeated in every stanza, though arranged in a different and intricate order. Henry Wadsworth Longfellow claims he was also the author of the metrical romance of Lancillotto, or Lancelot of the Lake, but this claim is completely unsubstantiated; Dante's reference to Daniel as the author of prose di romanzi ("proses of romance") thus remains a mystery. There are sixteen extant lyrics of Arnaut Daniel only one of which can be accurately dated, to 1181. Of the sixteen there is music for at least one of them, but it was composed at least a century after the poet's death by an anonymous author. No original melody has survived.

== Legacy ==
Daniel's attempt to avoid simple and commonplace expressions in favor of striving for newer and more subtle effects found an admirer in Dante who would imitate the sestina's form in more than one song. Petrarch also wrote several sestinas as the form later gained popularity with Italian poets.

In Dante's Divine Comedy, Arnaut Daniel appears as a character doing penance in Purgatory for lust. He responds in Old Occitan to the narrator's question about who he is:

Tan m'abellis vostre cortes deman,
qu'ieu no me puesc ni voill a vos cobrire.
Ieu sui Arnaut, que plor e vau cantan;
consiros vei la passada folor,
e vei jausen lo joi qu'esper, denan.
Ara vos prec, per aquella valor
que vos guida al som de l'escalina,
sovenha vos a temps de ma dolor.

(Purg., XXVI, 140–147)

Translation:

"Your courteous question pleases me so,
that I cannot and will not hide from you.
I am Arnaut, who weeping and singing go;
Contrite I see the folly of the past,
And, joyous, I foresee the joy I hope for one day.
Therefore do I implore you, by that power
Which guides you to the summit of the stairs,
Remember my suffering, in the right time."

It is not believed that it is a coincidence that Dante wrote about Daniel in eight lines, as that was the favored amount of lines per stanza that the troubadours preferred to write. Dante also replicated that style and stanza length in six out of the eleven Occitan poems that Dante references in his De Vulgari Eloquentia.

Throughout the entirety of the Divine Comedy, Dante upholds the ideas of Italian superiority extending from the Roman Empire into that of "modern" language. This is displayed in his writing of Arnaut Daniel in Occitan thus, in one commentator's opinion, mocking the closed and difficult style of troubadour poetry (trobar clus), compared to the open sweetness of Italian poetry.

In homage to these lines which Dante gave to Daniel, the European edition of T. S. Eliot's second volume of poetry was titled Ara Vos Prec. In addition, Eliot's poem The Waste Land opens and closes with references to Dante and Daniel. The Waste Land is dedicated to Pound as "il miglior fabbro" which is what Dante had called Daniel. The poem also contains a reference to Canto XXVI in its line "Poi s'ascose nel foco che gli affina" ("Then he hid in the fire that purifies them") which appears in Eliot's closing section of The Waste Land as it does to end Dante's canto.

Arnaut's 4th canto contains the lines that Pound claimed were "the three lines by which Daniel is most commonly known" (The Spirit of Romance, p. 36):

"leu sui Arnaut qu'amas l'aura
E chatz le lebre ab lo bou
E nadi contra suberna"

Translation:

"I am Arnaut who gathers up the wind,
And chases the hare with the ox,
And swims against the torrent."
