= Bertran de Born lo Filhs =

French knight and troubadour

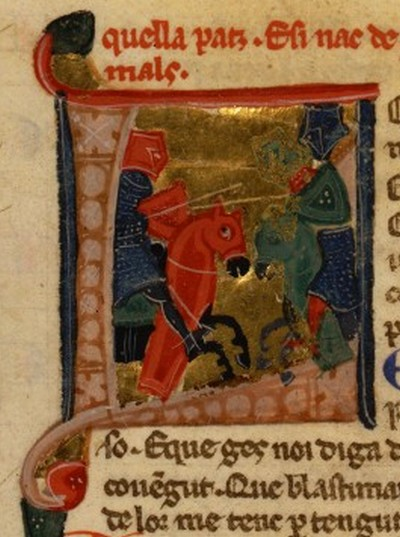
Bertrand de Born combattant

Bertran de Born (Occitan: [beɾˈtɾan de ˈbɔɾn]; c. 1179 – 1233), called lo Filhs ([lu ˈfiʎʃ], "the Son"), was a Limousin knight and troubadour. He wrote two sirventes and has three other works attributed to him. He participated in the wars of John Lackland in France.

He was a son of the famous troubadour Bertran de Born and his first wife, Raimonda, born shortly after their marriage in 1179. His full brother was Itier and his half brothers were Bertran and Constantin, sons of his father's second marriage, to Felipa, in 1192. Since the younger Bertran would have only been fourteen at the time of the troubadour's activity, the filhs of the chansonniers must be the eldest son. Bertran and his brother Itier were dubbed sometime before 1192.

The sirventes "Quan voi lo temps renovelar", written in 1206 in the style of his father, is attributed to "Bertran de Born" in the chansonniers, but since the elder Bertran had retired to the monastery of Dalon in 1197, this reference must be to his son. The sirventes is preceded by a long razo explaining the misfortunes of John Lackland and his evil, which is the subject of the poet's vitriol. An interesting cultural cross-reference occurs in the work when Bertran mentions the chanson de geste called the Siège d'Orange.

Bertran's second sirventes, "Un sirventes voil obrar d'alegratge", was a personal love poem to his lady, Flor de Lis (unknown by name). The other three works sometimes attributed to Bertran, but not definitively, are:

- "Gen part nostre reis liuranda"
- "Guerr'e pantais vei et afan"
- "Un sirventes farai novel plazen"

There is also a medieval attribution that is certainly in error:

- "A tornar m'er enquer al primer us" (actually by Guilhem Rainol d'At)
