= Peire Espanhol =

Limousin trobadour (c. 1150 – c. 1220)

Peire Espanhol (c. 1150 – c. 1220) was a Limousin troubadour with three extant cansos, including one religious alba, "Ar levatz sus, francha corteza gans!". His works have appeared, edited and with French translations, in Peter T. Ricketts, "Les poésies de Peire Espanhol: édition critique et traduction" in Studies in Honor of Hans-Erich Keller: Medieval French and Occitan Literature and Romance Linguistics, Rupert T. Pickens, ed. (Kalamazoo, 1993), pp. 383–95.

== Sources ==
- Bibliographie nationale française
