= Serena (genre) =

Old Occitan lyric genre

The serena (evening song) is a minor Old Occitan lyric genre. Despite the name, it is not a serenade. Rather, it is a counterpart to the alba (dawn song). In an alba, the lover laments the coming of the dawn that forces lovers to part. In the serena, the lover complains of the long wait for evening to arrive so he can consummate his love. The genre was invented late in the history of the Occitan lyric by the troubadour Guiraut Riquier in his song Ad un fin aman fon datz (A true lover once awaited), which he claimed to have completed in the year 1263, when he was living in Narbonne. The refrain of Guiraut's serena goes:

e dizia sospiran:
—Jorns, ben creyssetz a mon dan,
e·l sers
auci·m e sos loncx espers.

And with a sigh he said,
"Day, you grow long to my harm,
And this evening
Is killing me with waiting."

== Bibliography ==
- Chambers, F. M. (1985). An Introduction to Old Provençal Versification. American Philosophical Society.
- Chaytor, H. J. (1912). The Troubadours. Cambridge University Press.
- Paden, W. D.; Paden, F. F. (2007). Troubadour Poems from the South of France. D. S. Brewer.
- Riquer, M. de (1975). Los trovadores: historia literaria y textos. Vol. III. Editorial Planeta.
