= Aycart del Fossat =

Aycart (or Aicart) del Fossat (fl. 1250–68) was a troubadour from Le Fossat in Ariège. To him are attributed one sirventes and a partimen with Girard Cavalaz.

The sirventes is about the victory of Charles of Anjou over Conradin at the Battle of Tagliacozzo (1268). The partimen, "Si paradis et enfernz son aital", is a dilemma on the nature of Heaven and Hell (c. 1250). The debaters are known only as Aicart and Girart, but they have long been identified with Aycart and Girard. The partimen is preserved in a manuscript from Bergamo, where it has a Latin razo.

== Works ==
- Si paradis et enfernz son aital at Rialto
