= Guillem Magret =

French troubadour (1195–1210)

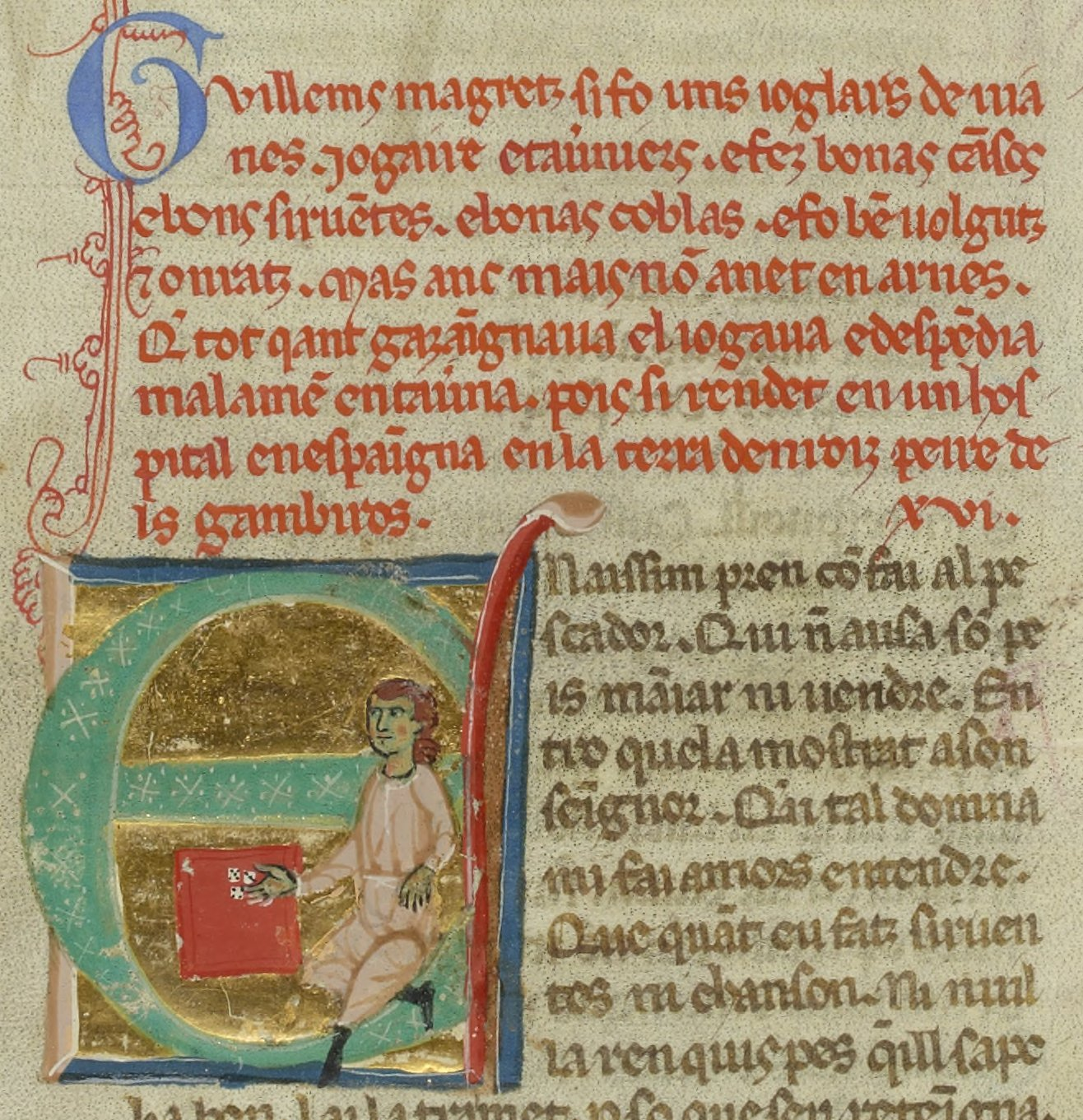
Miniature of Guillem found beneath his vida in MS I. He is shown playing dice; he has rolled a five, a four and a three.

Guillem or Guilhem Magret (Occitan: [ɡiˈʎɛm maˈɡɾɛt]; fl. 1195–1210) was a troubadour and jongleur from the Viennois. He left behind eight poems, of which survive a sirventes and a canso with melodies.

According to his vida, he was a gambler and publican who could not keep the money he earned but spent it away gambling and frequenting taverns, and so he was always ill-equipped for riding. In Maigret, pujat m’es el cap, a tenso with Guilhem Rainol d'Apt, he is despised by his debate partner as a joglar vielh, nesci, badoc: "an old, silly, stupid jongleur". Despite this, his biographer notes that he was well liked and honoured and his songs were "good".

Guillem travelled widely in Spain, sojourning at the courts of Peter II of Aragon and Alfonso IX of León. Eventually he entered a hospital in Spain, in the land of "Lord Roiz Peire dels Gambiaros" (probably Pedro Ruiz de los Cameros), and there ended his life. Among the dates which can be established for Guillem's life are 1196, when he composed a song on the death of Alfonso II and succession of Peter II in Aragon, and 1204, when he wrote a song to celebrate the November coronation of Peter by Pope Innocent III in Rome.

Guillem's music is rich, diverse, motivically-varied, and neumatically-textured. L'aigue puge contremont contains four unusual B–F leaps, which Guillem probably intended as a motive.

== Sources ==
- Aubrey, Elizabeth. The Music of the Troubadours. Indiana University Press, 1996. ISBN 0-253-21389-4.
- Egan, Margarita, ed. and trans. The Vidas of the Troubadours. New York: Garland, 1984. ISBN 0-8240-9437-9.
