= Pepe Aicart =

Spanish footballer (born 1986)

Personal information
- Full name: José Aicart Suis
- Date of birth: 17 October 1986 (age 40)
- Place of birth: Madrid, Spain
- Height: 1.83 m (6 ft 0 in)
- Position: Midfielder

Youth career
- Las Rozas
- Albacete

Senior career*
Years	Team	Apps	(Gls)
2005–2007	Albacete B		
2006	Albacete	1	(0)
2007–2009	Celta B	70	(1)
2008	Celta	1	(0)
2009–2011	Pontevedra	42	(1)
2011–2012	Gandía	29	(0)
2012–2013	Leganés	27	(0)
2013–2014	Huesca	33	(3)
2014–2016	Toledo	51	(3)
Total		254	(8)
- * Club domestic league appearances and goals as of 00:00, 12 June 2016 (UTC)

José "Pepe" Aicart Suis (born 17 October 1986 in Madrid) is a Spanish former professional footballer who played as a defensive midfielder.
