= Nuno Fernandes Torneol =

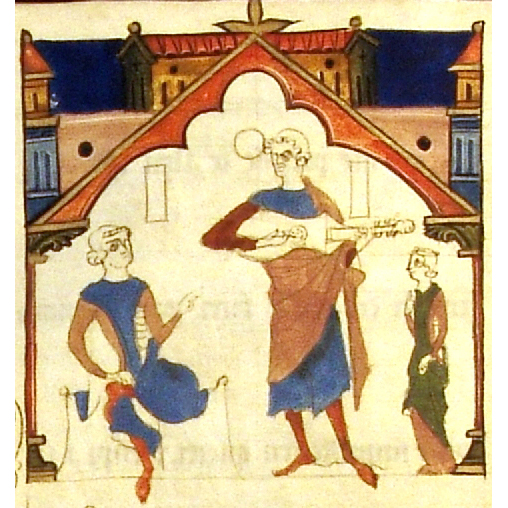
Miniature accompanying Nuno's song Ir-vos queredes, mia senhor in the Cancioneiro da Ajuda

Nuno Fernandes Torneol was a Galician-Portuguese trovador. He probably worked in the middle of the thirteenth century at the courts of Ferdinand III and Alfonso X of Castile. In "De longas vias, mui longas mentiras", the only cantiga de escárnio that he wrote, he mentions many Castilian place names. He is the also the author of the only known alborada (dawn song) in the Galician-Portuguese tradition: "Levad', amigo, que dormides as manhanas frías".

Nuno's name has been the subject of much speculation. In 1994 António Resende de Oliveira suggested that "Torneol" might not be a part of his name, but a note added by the 16th-century editor of the Cancioneiro da Biblioteca Nacional, Angelo Colocci, indicating the refrain (tornel) to be used in the following songs. In 1997, however, Vicenç Beltran discovered a reference in a document of 1244 to one João Fernandes Torniol who owned a vineyard in Córdoba. This may have been the trovador's brother. In a document of 1262 José António Souto Cable found a Fernandus Petri, dictus “Turniol” de Villari, who confirmed a sale to Archbishop Juan Arias (1238–66). This same Fernandus is mentioned as the second of three nephews in the 1269 will of Abril Fernandes. If these references are to Nuno's family, he was from Galicia, probably near Santiago.

== Sources ==
- Nuno Fernandes Torneol at Cantigas Medievais Galego-Portuguesas
