= Raimon de las Salas =

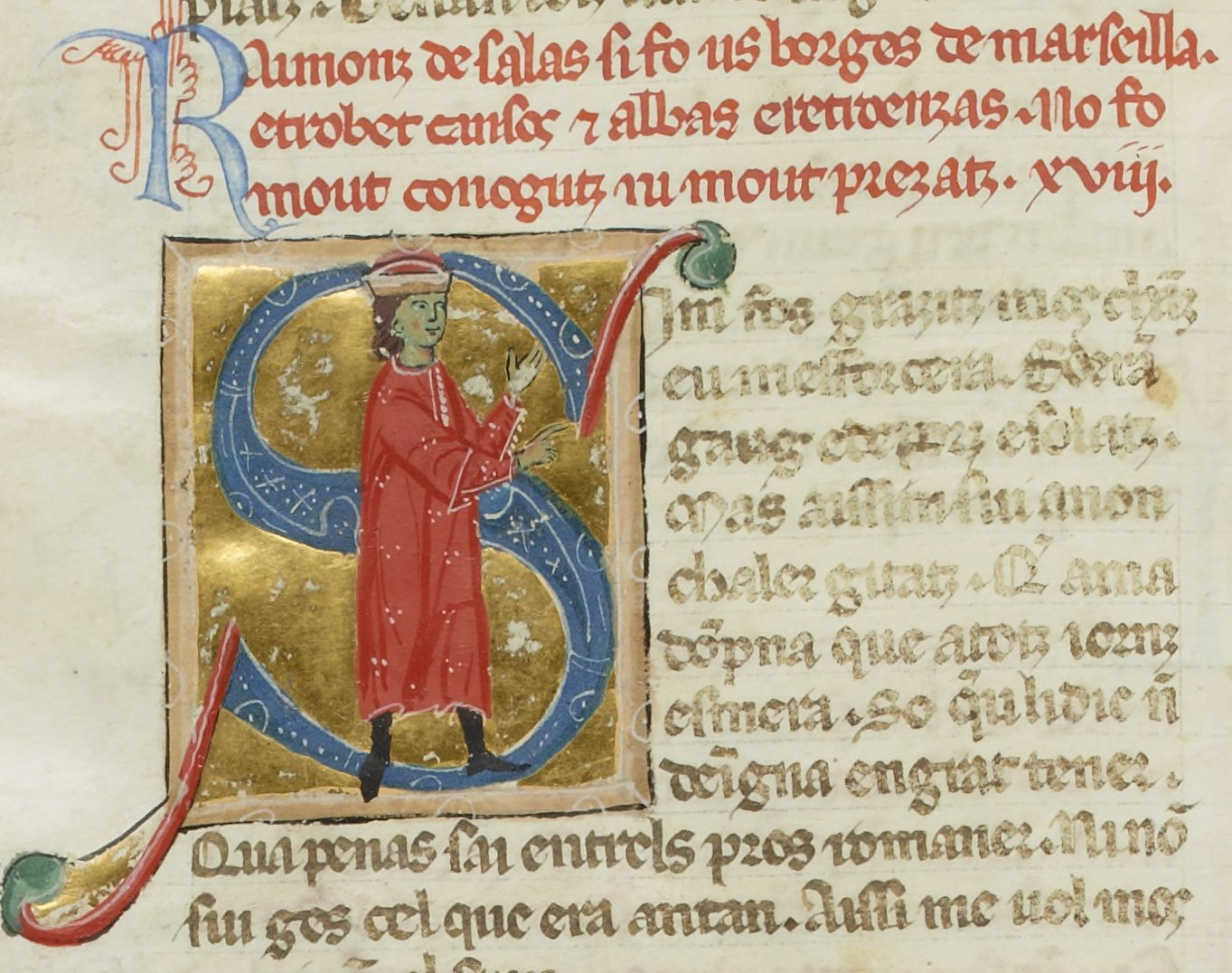
Raimonz de salas si fo us borges de marseilla e trober cansos e albas. . . "Raimon de Salas was a burger of Marseille and he composed love songs and dawn songs. . ."

Raimon de (las) Salas or la Sala was a Provençal troubadour probably of the 1220s/1230s. His short vida survives. He left behind four or five poems, but he must have composed more, since he is vida records his composition of cansos, albas, and retroensas. Along with Ferrari da Ferrara, he is the only troubadour known to have tried his hand at the retroensa.

Raimon was a burgess from Marseille. He may have served at the court of Hugh II des Baux, viscount of Marseille, from 1193 to 1240. He mentions Raimbalda des Baux in one of his poems. His vida records that he was neither well known nor esteemed.

Two of Raimon's tensos were composed with women, including Si.m fos graziz mos chanz, eu m'esforcera, which has a modern English translation by Meg Bogin. Raimon also composed a partimen with an otherwise unknown Bertran, who proposed the dilemma: who are better at making war, feasts, and gifts, the Lombards or Provençals? Raimon praises his compatriots and puts down Lombard women as big and ugly.

== Sources ==
- Bogin, Meg. The Women Troubadours. Scarborough: Paddington, 1976. ISBN 0-8467-0113-8.
- Bruckner, Matilda Tomaryn; Shepard, Laurie; and White, Sarah. Songs of the Women Troubadours. New York: Garland Publishing, 1995. ISBN 0-8153-0817-5.
- Caudill, Tamara B. "Half the Man I Used to Be: Raimon de las Salas and the Trouble with the Trobairitz." Tenso 32:1 (2017), pp. 1–18.
- Egan, Margarita, ed. The Vidas of the Troubadours. New York: Garland, 1984. ISBN 0-8240-9437-9.
- Paterson, Linda M. The World of the Troubadours: Medieval Occitan Society, c. 1100–c. 1300. Cambridge: Cambridge University Press, 1993. ISBN 0-521-55832-8.
- Riquer, Martín de. Los trovadores: historia literaria y textos. 3 vol. Barcelona: Planeta, 1975.
