= Peire de Bussignac =

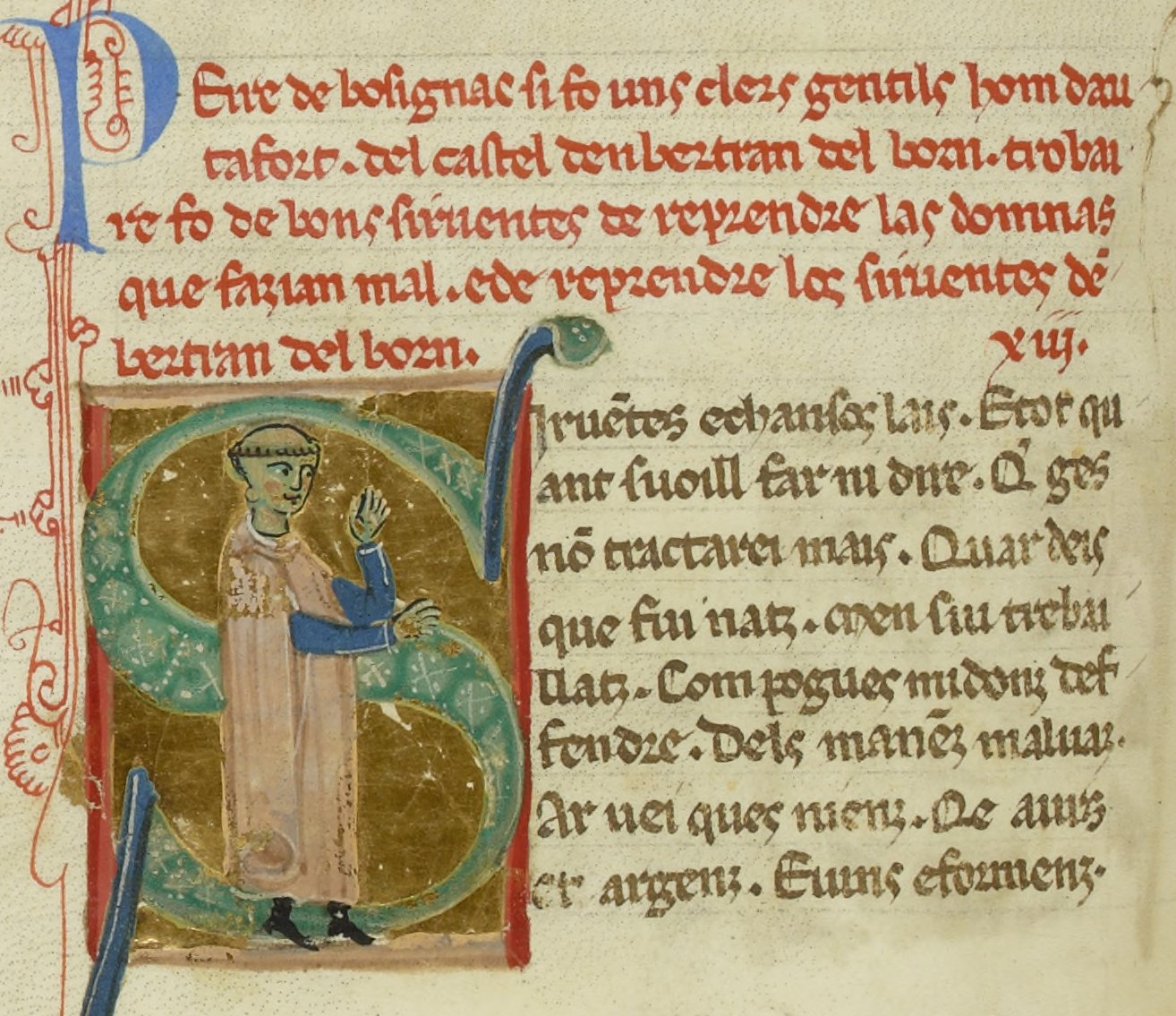
Peire de Bosignac si fo uns clercs gentils hom d'Autafort. . . "Peire de Bussignac was a cleric, a gentleman from Autrafort. . ."

Peire de Bussignac, Bossinhac, or Bocinhac (fl. c. 1160) was a nobleman, cleric, and troubadour from the Périgord. He was probably from Bussignac in Hautefort, but possibly Boussignac in Tulle. He was, according to his vida, "from the castle of Bertran de Born". Though his vida speaks of "good sirventes" to reproach ladies for bad behaviour and sirventes attacking Bertran, only one sirventes by Peire survives: Quan lo dous temps d'abril, an attack on women as ne'er-do-well gossips.

== Sources ==
- The Vidas of the Troubadours. Margarita Egan, trans. New York: Garland, 1984. ISBN 0-8240-9437-9.
