= Guillem Agel i Barrière =

Guillem Agel i Barrière was a leading Catalan printer and publisher who was born in Thuir, Roussillon, France (formerly North Catalonia) in 1753, and died in 1832.

During the years prior to the French Revolution, Agel i Barrière promoted the development of theater for the benefits of the Church of Thuir.

The continuity of these productions attracted the most important playwrights of Roussillon to the city (the so-called[Group of Thuir). In addition, the interest of Agel i Barrière for theater led him to collect scripts that were circulating, some of which he printed. For example, in the case of the Catalan translation of Racine's tragedy Esther (1792).

He also collected Catalan translations of French plays that had been translated by the members of the Group: Zaira by Voltaire, Atalia by Racine and Corneille’s Polyeucte, as well as original plays from these same authors.

Additionally, Agel i Barrière was the author of a rhetorical treatise entitled Poésies ad usum Guillelmi Barrière, which is now kept at the manuscript archives of the Department of Pyrenees-Orientales in Perpignan, France. <Diccionari de la Literatura Catalana, 2008>
