= Albertet Cailla =

Albigeois jongleur and troubadour

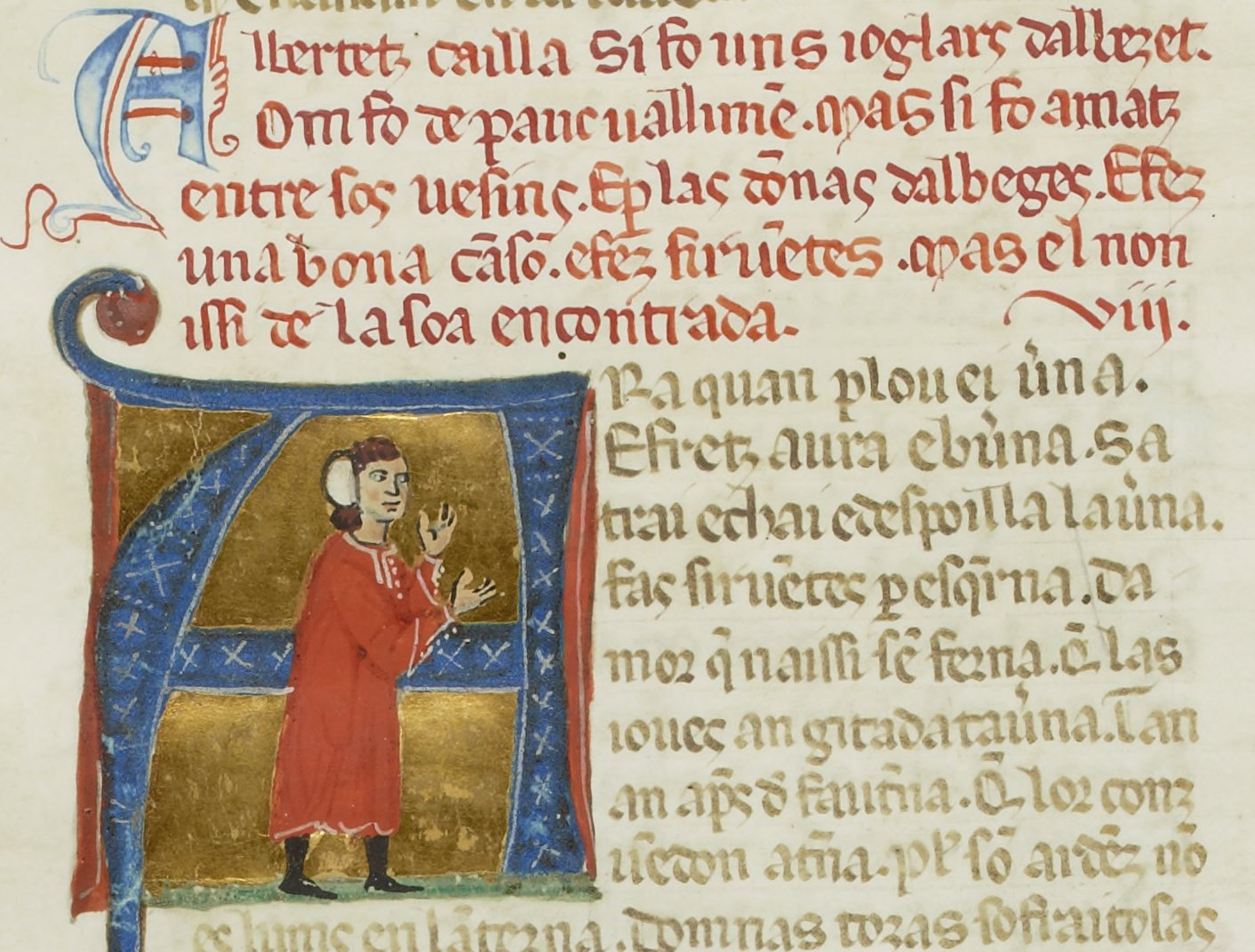
Albertetz cailla si fo uns ioglars dalbezet. . . "Albertet Cailla was a jongleur from Albezet. . ."

Albertet Cailla (Note: His first name may also be spelled Abertet, his surname Calha.) was an Albigeois jongleur and troubadour. According to his vida he was "of slight worth" but beloved by his neighbours and the local women. His vida says that he composed one good canso and several sirventes, but only one partimen survives. It was said he never left the Albigeois.

There is a tenso on the merits of old and young women which is ascribed to Albertet in at least two chansonniers, manuscripts I and K.

== Sources ==
- The Vidas of the Troubadours. Margarita Egan, trans. New York: Garland, 1984. ISBN 0-8240-9437-9.
- Shepard, William P. "A Provençal "Debat" on Youth and Age in Women." Modern Philology, Vol. 29, No. 2. (Nov., 1931), pp. 149–161.
