= Guilhem Rainol d'At =

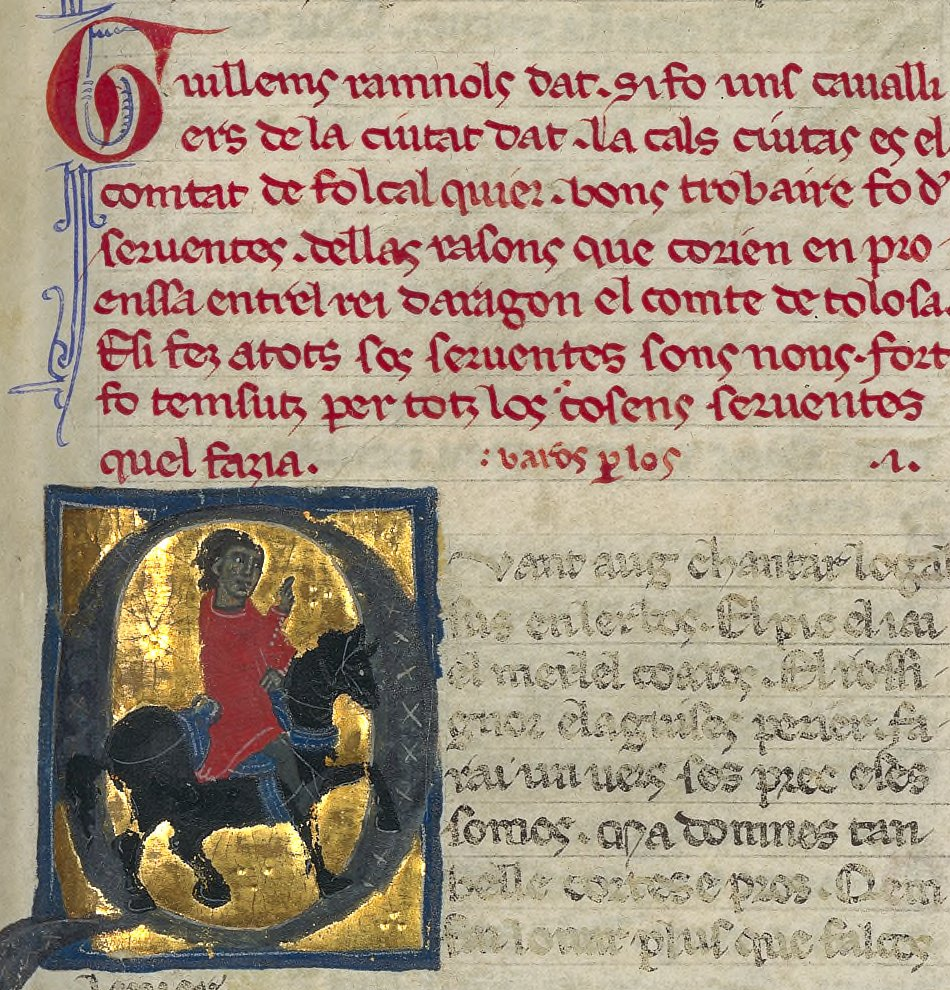
Guillems ramnols dat si fo uns cavalliers de la ciutat dat la cals ciutas es el comtat de folcalquier. "Guilhem Rainol d'At was a knight from the city of At, which city was in the county of Forcalquier"

Guilhem Rainol d'At (also Guillem; fl. 1209) was a minor Provençal troubadour from Apt in the Vaucluse.

Guilhem Rainol was probably the Guilelmus Ranoli who witnessed a document of Alfonso II of Provence in 1209. In the north Italian troubadour manuscript D (1254, now in the Biblioteca Estense, Modena), the poem A tornar m'er enquer al primer us is assigned to Guillems Rauols, probably an orthographic error for Guilhem Rainol. Elsewhere this same work is ascribed to Tomier and Palaizi, Bertran de Born, or Bertran lo Filhs.

Little to nothing is known of Guilhem's life. In a tenso with Guilhem Magret, his interlocutor alludes to his having left the religious life. Guilhem's own works hint at a religious inclination. In the sirventes L'aissatz m'era de chantar he attacks the rich, whom he portrays as humbled by the clerics. His most interesting works, however, give insight into his personality and his home life: his light songs Quant aug chantar lo gal sus en l'erbos and Auzir cugei lo chant e.l crit el glat were tensos he made up between him and his wife.

== Sources ==
- Riquer, Martín de. Los trovadores: historia literaria y textos. 3 vol. Barcelona: Planeta, 1975.
