= Razo =

Occitan preface to troubadour composition

A razo (Old Occitan: [raˈzu], literally "cause", "reason") was a short piece of Occitan prose detailing the circumstances of a troubadour composition. A razo normally introduced an individual poem, acting as a prose preface and explanation; it might, however, share some of the characteristics of a vida (a biography of a troubadour, describing his origins, his loves, and his works) and the boundary between the two genres was never sharp.

In the chansonniers, the manuscript collections of medieval troubadour poetry, some poems are accompanied by a prose explanation whose purpose is to give the reason why the poem was composed. These texts are occasionally based on independent sources. To that extent, they supplement the vidas in the same manuscripts and are useful to modern literary and historical researchers. Often, however, it is clear that assertions in the razos are simply deduced from literal readings of details in the poems. Most of the surviving razo corpus is the work of Uc de Saint Circ, composed in Italy between 1227 and 1230.

In one case, a manuscript from Bergamo, there is an explanatory rubric preceding the Occitan partimen Si paradis et enfernz son aital by Girard Cavalaz and Aycart del Fossat is in Latin.

== Sources ==
- Burgwinkle, William E. (2019) [1990]. Razos and Troubadour Songs. London: Routledge.
- Boutière, Jean; Schutz, Alexander Herman. Biographies des troubadours: textes provençaux des XIIIe et XIVe siècle. Paris: A. G. Nizet, 1964.
- Poe, Elizabeth W. "At the Boundary between Vida and Razo: The Biography of Raimon Jordan." Neophilologus, 72:2 (Apr., 1988) pp. 316–319.
- Schutz, A. H. "Where Were the Provençal Vidas and Razos Written?" Modern Philology, 35:3 (Feb., 1938), pp. 225–232.

== See also ==
- Linquo coax ranis, a Latin equivalent
