= Aimeric de Peguilhan =

Occitan troubadour (c. 1170-c. 1230)

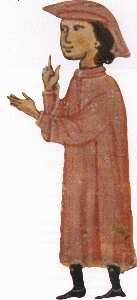
Aimeric de Peguilhan, from a 13th-century chansonnier now in the Bibliothèque nationale de France

Aimeric or Aimery de Peguilhan, Peguillan, or Pégulhan (c. 1170 – c. 1230) was a troubadour (fl. 1190–1221) born in Peguilhan (near Saint-Gaudens), the son of a cloth merchant.

Aimeric's first patron was Raimon V of Toulouse, followed by his son Raimon VI. However, he fled the region at the threat of the Albigensian Crusade and spent some time in Spain and ten years in Lombardy. It is said that he had secretly loved a neighbour while living in Toulouse, and that it was for her that he returned.

Aimeric is known to have composed at least fifty works, the music for six of which survives:

- Atressi·m pren com fai al jogador
- Cel que s'irais ni guerrej' ab amor
- En Amor trop alques en que·m refraing
- En greu pantais m'a tengut longamen
- Per solatz d'autrui chan soven
- Qui la vi, en ditz

Most of his works were bland cansos with a few tensos (with Sordello and Albertet de Sestaro).

== Sources ==
- Gaunt, Simon, and Kay, Sarah (edd.) The Troubadours: An Introduction. Cambridge: Cambridge University Press, 1999. ISBN 0-521-57473-0.
