= Eble of Ventadorn =

Eble of Ventadorn or, in French, Ebles de Ventadour is the name of a succession of rulers of a lordship in the Limousin (central France), including:

- Eble I of Ventadorn
- Eble II of Ventadorn (died 1155), said to have been a troubadour, though none of his poems survive
- Eble III of Ventadorn (died 1170), patron of the troubadour Bernart de Ventadorn
- Eble IV of Ventadorn
- Eble V of Ventadorn (died after 1236), husband of Maria de Ventadorn
- Eble VI of Ventadorn
