= Pons de Capduelh =

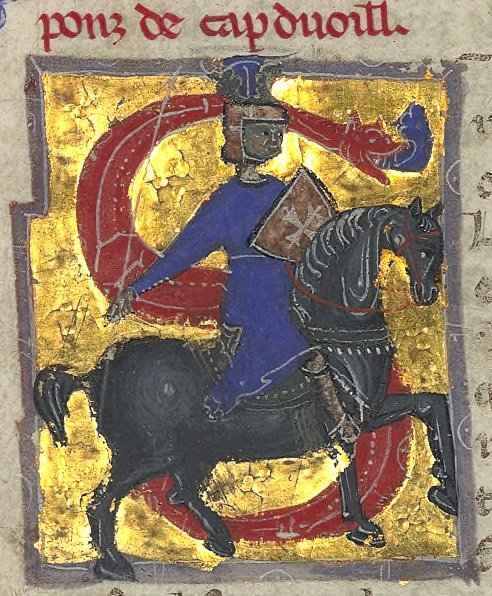
Pons portrayed as a crusader: a knight with a cross on his shield.

Pons de Capduelh (Note: His toponymic surname is also spelled Capduell, Capdveyll, Capdveill, Capduoill, Capdoill or Capdolh in medieval documents. His first may appear as Pontz.) (fl. 1160–1220 or 1190–1237) was a troubadour from the Auvergne, probably from Chapteuil. His songs were known for their great gaiety. He was a popular poet and 27 of his songs are preserved, some in as many as 15 manuscripts. Four of his cansos survive with musical notation.

== Biography ==
=== Vida and razo ===
There survives a vida, or short biography, of Pons written by a contemporary and fellow troubadour, Uc de Saint Circ. According to Uc, Pons and troubadour Guillem de Saint Leidier were both from the diocese of Le Puy, and while Guillem was "generous with money" (larcs donaire d'aver), Pons was very stingy (fort escars d'aver). He reportedly loved Azalais, daughter of Bernard VII of Anduze and wife of Oisil de Mercoeur (or Mercuor). (Bernard of Anduze was a patron of many troubadours.) The vida states that "[Pons] loved [Azalais] dearly and praised her and made many good songs about her; and as long as he lived, he loved no other, and when the lady died, he took the cross and went over the sea and died there." According to the razo (Note: A short explanation of a song.) that follows the vida in some manuscripts, Pons, to test Azalais's love for him, began loving another woman, Audiart, wife of Roselin, lord of Marseille. The rift between them was only healed by the intervention of Maria de Ventadorn and the viscountess of Aubusson. After Azalais's death in 1237, Pons wrote a planh (lament) for her, "De totz caitius sui eu aicel que plus". Some scholars argue that this planh was in fact written for Alazais de Boissazo, who died before 1220, and others have erroneously equated Azalais with the lady known only as Sail-de-Claustra in the poems of Peirol.

Pons was exiled from his homeland in the middle of the 1210s and travelled "through Provence" (per Proensa) in order to join the Fifth Crusade around 1220. According to the untrustworthy Jean de Nostredame, he died after participating in the conquest of Jerusalem, in 1227. Older scholars, such as Friedrich Christian Diez and Max von Napolski, believed that Pons died on the Third Crusade in 1189, but this is conclusively disproven.

=== Documentary evidence ===
The parents of Pons are unknown, but he was of the family of the lords of Fay and had six children identifiable in the records. Pons is probably to be identified with the "Pontius de Capitolio" who appears in documents between 1189 and 1220. Before 1196, Pontius married a woman named Jarentone who brought him the castle of Vertaizon, a fief of the bishop of Clermont, as a dowry. In 1199, Pons imprisoned Bishop Robert of Clermont. In 1205, responding to an inquiry begun by Pope Innocent III, King Philip II forced Jarentone to hand over Vertaizon to the bishop. In 1211, Pons and Jarentone, with their three sons, three daughters and three sons-in-law, sold Vertaizon to the bishop for 7,650 marks, of which 7,000 were to be retained by the bishop as compensation for his unlawful imprisonment. Pons's sons were Jourdain, Pierre de Fay and Jarenton.

Pons was probably acquainted with the trobairitz Clara d'Anduza and the troubadours Dalfi d'Alvernha, Folquet de Marselha (whom he praised in a song), and Peirol. Gui de Cavaillon and Ricau de Tarascon invoke Pons and Audiart as judges of their tenso, composed after 1210, and Elias de Barjols also mentions Pons. Pons is also mentioned by Gervase of Tilbury in his Otia Imperialia, where he is explained to have been the lord of the werewolf Raimbaud de Pouget, whose disinheritance by Pons led to his transformation and subsequent violent rampage.

Of all Pons's works, with the possible exception of the planh, only his two crusade songs can be dated with confidence to around 1213. "So qu'om plus vol e plus es voluntos" was written after the battle of Las Navas de Tolosa (16 July 1212) and before the battle of Muret (12 September 1213), since it was dedicated to Peter II of Aragon, who died there. The crusade song "En honor del pair'en cui es", which has the form of a sirventes, refers to war of the Holy Roman Emperor (probably Otto IV) and the King of England against Philip II and the "King of Apulia" (probably Frederick II). This is probably the War of Bouvines.

Pons's songs "S'eu fis ni dis nuilla sazo" and "Tuich dison q'el temps de pascor" are speculatively dated to around 1210.

== List of surviving works ==
Cansos

- Aissi m'es pres cum celui que cercan
- Astrucs es cel cui amors te jojos (Note: In one manuscript, ascribed to Peire de Mensac.)
- Ben es fols cel que reigna (Note: In one manuscript, ascribed to Albertet de Sestaro.)
- Ben sai que per sobrevoler (Note: In one manuscript, ...sobrevaler.)
- Coras que.m tengues jauzen
- Ges per la coindeta sason
- Humils e francs e fis soplei ves vos (Note: In one manuscript, ascribed to Bernart de Ventadorn.)
- Ja non er hom tan pros (Note: In one manuscript, ascribed to Arnaut de Maroill.)
- L'adregz solatz e l'aveinens compaigna (Note: In other manuscripts, ascribed to Peire Rogiers de Mirapeysh and Aimeric de Peguillan.)
- L'amoros pensamenz
- Lejals amics cui amors te jojos (with music)
- Ma domna.m ditz qu'eu fatz orgoill
- Meills qu'om no pot dir ni pensar
- Per joi d'amor e de fis amadors
- Qui per nesci cuidar
- S'eu fis ni dis nuilla sazo (Note: In one manuscript, S'anc fis ni....)
- Si com celui qu'a pro de valedors (Note: In some manuscripts, ascribed to Arnaut de Maroill and Bernart Amoros.)
- Si totz los gaugz e.ls bes (Note: In one manuscript, ascribed to Peire d'Alvernhe.)
- Tan m'a donat fin cor e ferm voler
- Tant mi destrein uns desconortz qi.m ve
- Tuich dison q'el temps de pascor
- Us gais conortz me fai gajamen far (with music)

Crusade songs

- Ar nos sia capdelhs e garentia (Note: In one manuscript, Er nos sia...)
- En honor del pair'en cui es
- So qu'om plus vol e plus es voluntos

Descorts

- Un gai descort tramet leis cui dezir (Note: Survives in several fragments in different manuscripts.)

Planhs

- De totz caitius sui eu aicel que plus

== Footnotes ==
Notes

Citations

== Sources ==
- Aubrey, Elizabeth. The Music of the Troubadours. Indiana University Press, 1996. ISBN 0-253-21389-4
- Chambers, Frank M. Review of "Le troubadour Pons, seigneur de Chapteuil et de Vertaizon: son temps, sa vie, son oeuvre" by Jean Perrel. Romance Philology 32, 1 (1978): 140.
- Lucas, H. H. "Pons de Capduoill and Azalais de Mercuor: A Study of the Planh". Nottingham Mediaeval Studies 2 (1958): 119–13.
- Poe, Elizabeth Wilson. "Old Provençal Escars/Escas: "Poor"? Reconsidering the Reputation of Pons de Capdoill". Tenso 4, 2 (1989): 37–58.
