= D'Ussel =

d'Ussel is a surname. Notable persons with that surname include:

- Eble d'Ussel (fl. c. 1200), Limousin troubadour
- Elias d'Ussel (fl. c. 1200), Limousin troubadour
- Gui d'Ussel (fl. 1195–1209), Limousin troubadour
- Peire d'Ussel (fl. c. 1200), Limousin troubadour
- Jeanne d'Ussel (marriage in 1371), countess of Forez
