= Raymond of Turenne =

Raymond of Turenne may refer to:

- Raymond I of Turenne, 7th Viscount of Turenne
- Raymond II of Turenne, 9th Viscount of Turenne
- Raymond III of Turenne, 10th Viscount of Turenne
- Raymond IV of Turenne, 11th Viscount of Turenne
- Raymond VIII of Turenne, 20th Viscount of Turenne
