= Maria de Ventadorn =

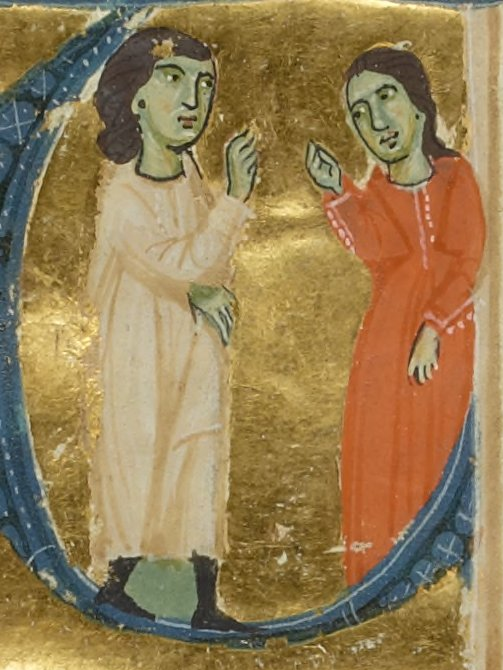
Gaucelm Faidit and Marie de Ventadour in a 13th century chansonnier.

Maria de Ventadorn (or Ventedorn) (French: Marie de Ventadour) was a patron of troubadour poetry at the end of the 12th century.

== Life ==
Maria was one of las tres de Torena, "the three of Turenne", the three daughters of viscount Raymond II of Turenne and of Elise de Séverac. These three, according to Bertran de Born, possessed tota beltat terrena, "all earthly beauty". Her date of birth is uncertain; she possibly died in 1222. Her name is variously recorded as Marie de Turenne and Marguerite de Turenne. She married viscount Eble V of Ventadour (Corrèze, France); they had a son, Eble (VI), who married Dauphine de la Tour d'Auvergne, and a daughter, Alix or Alasia.

Maria's husband was the grandson of Eble III (patron of the important early troubadour Bernart de Ventadorn), and the great-grandson of Eble le chanteur, believed to have been among the creators of the genre. Maria is addressed, or at least mentioned, in the work of several troubadours including Gaucelm Faidit, the Monk of Montaudon, Gausbert de Puicibot, Pons de Capduelh, Guiraut de Calanso, Bertran de Born and Gui d'Ussel. According to a poetic commentary included in the Biographies des Troubadours, Hugh IX of Lusignan was Maria's "knight" (era sos cavalliers).

Maria de Ventadorn is listed as a trobairitz in her own right on the strength of a single tensó or poetic debate (dated c. 1197), of which alternate verses were apparently composed by her and by Gui d'Ussel. The question at issue in the debate was this: once a man has succeeded in his plea to be accepted as a lady's lover, does he thereafter become her equal, or does he remain her servant? Maria takes the latter view.
