= Eble II of Ventadorn =

Eble II of Ventadorn was viscount of Ventadour (Corrèze, France). He was born at some date after 1086, the son of Eble I (died 1096) and of Almodis de Montberon.

Eble II was the Ebolus cantator (a singer named Eble, Eble le chanteur), who according to a contemporary historian, Geoffroy, prior of Vigeois, erat valde gratiosus in cantilenis ("gave a great deal of pleasure by his songs"). None of his poems survive: perhaps none were written down. He is often credited as the first Provençal troubadour, an immediate predecessor of and an influence on William IX of Aquitaine and Bernart de Ventadorn.

Eble II married Alix or Agnes, daughter of Guillaume de Montluçon. They had three sons, Eble (III), Guillaume, and Archambaud. Guillaume became lord of Ussel and apparently the founder of a family that included four troubadours, Eble, Peire, Gui and Elias d'Ussel.

Eble II of Ventadorn died in 1155 at Montecassino, Italy.
