= Boso I =

Boso I may refer to:

- Boso the Elder, first of the Bosonid dynasty
- Boso I of La Marche (fl. 944–997), count of La Marche and Périgord
- Boso I of Turenne (died 1091), viscount of Turenne
- Boso I (bishop of Aosta) (died 1113/1114), bishop of Aosta
- Boso I, Viscount of Aosta (died 1125)

== See also ==
- Boso II
- Boso III
- Boso of Provence
- Boso of Tuscany
- Boso of Arles
