= Gui d'Ussel =

French troubadour

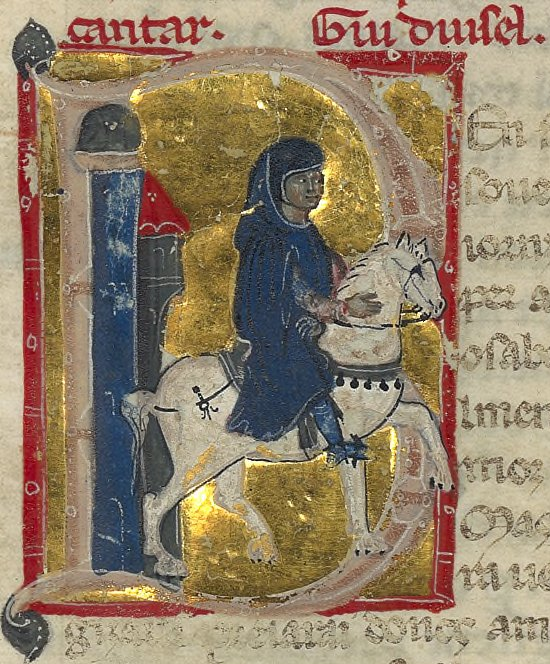
His name is "Gui duisel" above the top right of his miniature.

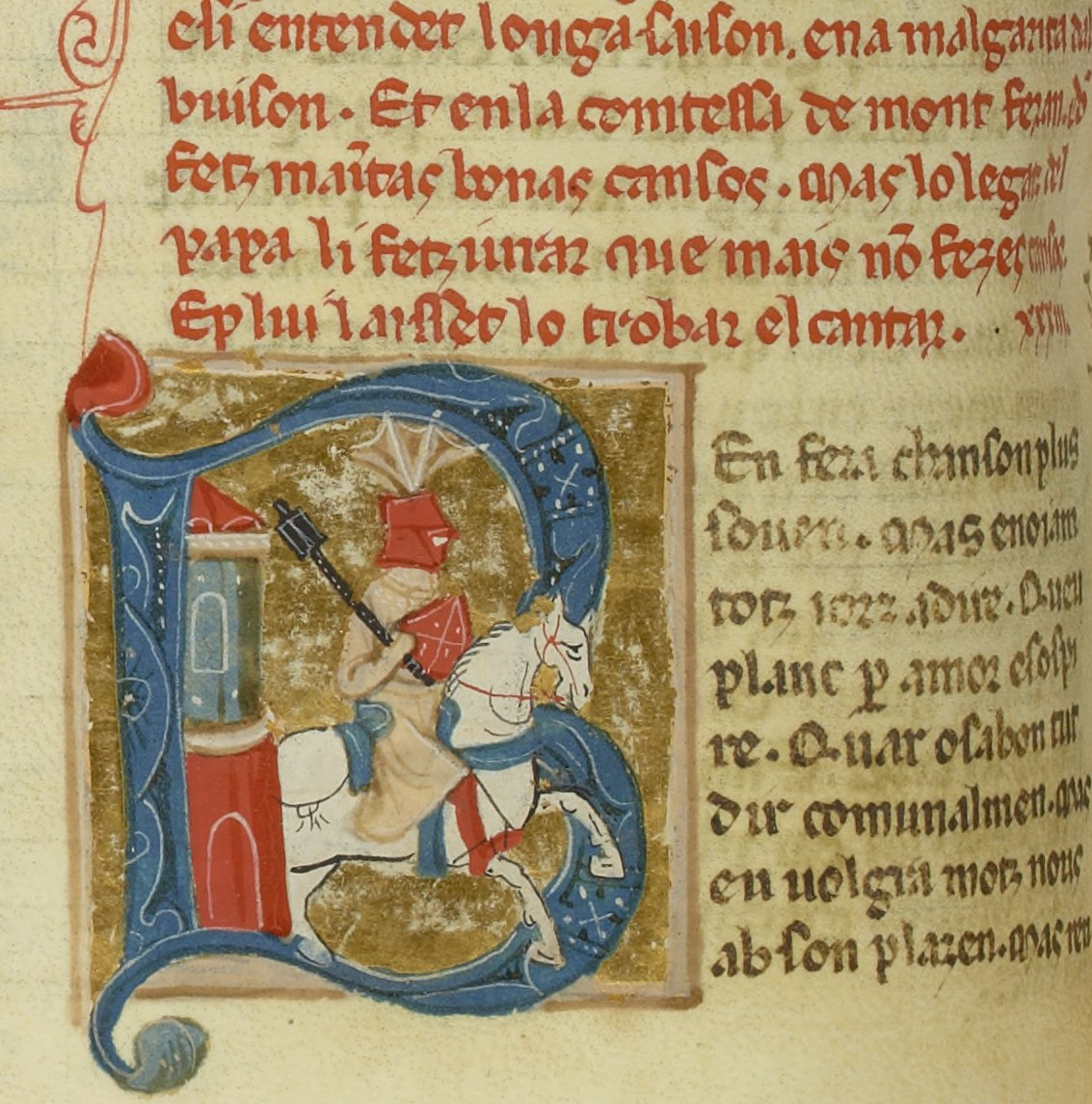
Gui depicted as a knight in armour bearing a mace.

Gui d'Ussel, d'Ussèl, or d'Uisel (fl. 1195–1209) was a troubadour from the Limousin. Twenty of his poems survive: eight cansos, two pastorelas, two coblas, and eight tensos, several with his relatives and including a partimen with Maria de Ventadorn. Four of his cansos melodies remain.

According to his vida, Gui was the youngest of three sons of a wealthy noble family of the castle Ussel-sur-Sarzonne, northeast of Ventadorn. He and his brothers Ebles and Peire, as well as his cousin Elias, are all reputed troubadours and castellans of Ussel according to the author of the vida, who makes Gui himself a canon of Montferrand and Brioude in the diocese of Clermont. Among his relatives Gui was known for his cansos. The only confirmation of Gui's family from outside his vida is a reference to the brothers Guido and Eblo Usseli donating land to the abbey of Bonaigue. Gui's biographer believed him to have been in love with Malgarita, wife of Rainaut VI, viscount of Aubusson. He supposedly later fell in love with Guillemette de Comborn, wife of Dalfi d'Alvernha, and composed many songs about her. Gui spent almost his entire life in the Limousin and Auvergne, rarely travelling abroad.

Gui addresses several of his songs to Maria de Ventadorn (including the partimen) and makes reference to Peter II of Aragon in one which survives with a melody. The reference to Peter's queen in the song's razo puts the date of its composition in 1204 or later, after Peter's marriage to Marie of Montpellier. His vida records how Gui obeyed a papal injunction from Pierre de Castelnau to cease composing in 1209 and the fact that none of his poems can be reliably assigned later than that date and none mention the Albigensian Crusade, it is probable that Gui did indeed obey papal orders and cease writing.

Gui's poetry to some measure imitates that of his contemporary Cadenet, whom he mentions in one piece. His melodies have something in common with those of Gaucelm Faidit, whom he may have met in Ventadorn. His melodies all stay within a minor tenth interval and use numerous thirds and triads, but never repeating phrases in the AAB form. His music is characterised by motivic variety and he has been praised for his "subtle and creative compositional faculty". The later troubadour Daude de Pradas referred to Gui in a tenso and his melody has given some indication that it may have been influenced by those of Gui.

Gui's works were reproduced in the anthology of Ferrarino Trogni da Ferrara.

== Sources ==
- Aubrey, Elizabeth. The Music of the Troubadours. Indiana University Press, 1996. ISBN 0-253-21389-4.
- Egan, Margarita, ed. and trans. The Vidas of the Troubadours. New York: Garland, 1984. ISBN 0-8240-9437-9.
- Gaunt, Simon, and Kay, Sarah, edd. The Troubadours: An Introduction. Cambridge: Cambridge University Press, 1999. ISBN 0-521-57473-0.
- Perrin, Robert H. "Descant and Troubadour Melodies: A Problem in Terms." Journal of the American Musicological Society, 16:3, (Autumn, 1963), pp. 313–324.
