= Robert of Auvergne =

French archbishop (died 1234)

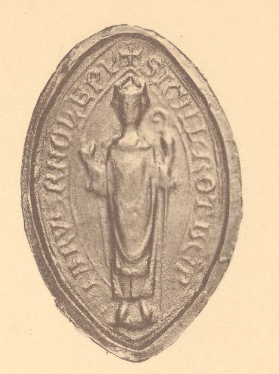
Robert's seal from 1186

Robert of Auvergne, also called Robert de la Tour (died 7 January 1234), was a French nobleman, prelate and poet from the Auvergne. He served as bishop of Clermont from 1195 until 1227 and thereafter as archbishop of Lyon until his death. He was also a troubadour, composing poetry in Occitan.

Robert was involved in several feudal conflicts between 1195 and 1211. Twice imprisoned (1199, 1207) and accused of murder and rapine, his disputes with family and vassals drew intervention from both king and pope. He emerged victorious and in control of the city of Clermont itself. He also added lands and castles to his diocese and took part in the Albigensian Crusade (1209). After his election as archbishop, he was imprisoned a third time for interfering with the marriage politics of the count of Champagne, but was soon liberated by his friends. He was less successful in Lyon, where his pontificate is marked by disputes with the rising merchant class. His health declined in his final two years.

Robert's known literary career fell between 1195 and 1212. He is describes as lo Vesques de Clarmon ('the bishop of Clermont') in the songbooks. Little of his poetry survives and all that does concerns disagreements with his cousin, Dalfi d'Alvernhe. Dalfi states that the bishop had a lady lover and the bishop hints at Dalfi's sexual inadequacy, but it is difficult to know what reality lies behind their joking exchange.

== Family and early life ==
Robert was born into the highest nobility of France. He was a younger son of Count Robert IV of Auvergne and Matilda, daughter of Duke Odo II of Burgundy. His elder brothers were Counts William IX and Guy II. He was a cousin of the troubadour Dalfi d'Alvernhe, a first cousin of Duke Odo III of Burgundy and a first cousin once removed of King Philip II of France (through the latter's grandmother, Matilda of Carinthia). He was also related to the counts of Forez and thus to Archbishop Renaud of Lyon.

Prior to his election as bishop, Robert was the dean of the chapter of the cathedral of Autun. Autun lay within the ecclesiastical province of Lyon.

== Bishop of Clermont ==
Robert was elected bishop of Clermont in 1195. In 1197, he dedicated the Abbey of Le Bouchet, founded by his father.

Between 1197 and 1201 Robert was involved in a quarrel with his brother Guy in which both resorted to force. In 1197, Robert excommunicated his brother and placed his lands under interdict. He then ravaged his lands with hired soldiers for the next two years. At the same time, Robert got into a dispute with the troubadour Pons de Capduelh over the castle of Vertaizon, which Pons had received from his wife as a dowry some time before 1196 and which the bishop claimed as a fief.

In 1199, Guy wrote to Pope Innocent III requesting intervention. Before receiving a response, he engineered Robert's capture. Pons seized the bishop and imprisoned him in Vertaizon before handing him over to Guy. The bishop was accused of murder, arson and pillage. When Innocent learned of his imprisonment, he authorized the archbishop of Bourges, Henry de Sully, to absolve Guy on condition of penance for his own excesses. Henry reconciled the brothers in July 1199, and mediated a peace agreement signed in May 1201.

As bishop, Robert sought to increase his hold on his castles and to expand his diocese's territory. In 1199, Count Guy did homage to his brother for the castle of Lezoux. In 1202, Guy committed the city of Clermont to the bishop's keeping until he had made peace with King Philip. Guy had sided with the English in the Anglo-French War of 1202–1204. Robert thus became the first bishop to govern the city directly, a position subsequent bishops retained down to 1552.

In 1205, Innocent III opened an inquiry into the dispute between Robert and Pons, which was still unresolved. At this, King Philip II intervened to force Pons' wife to turn the castle over to Robert. In 1211 Pons and his wife, with their three sons, three daughters and three sons-in-law, sold Vertaizon to the bishop for 7,650 marks, of which 7,000 were to be retained by the bishop as compensation for his unlawful imprisonment.

In 1206, Robert and Guy again fell into dispute. In 1207, Guy again imprisoned his brother. Although excommunicated by the pope, he only released Robert after King Philip marched an army against him. He had to pay reparations and give security. In 1207, Robert acquired the fiefs of Montmorin and Mauzun from the king. A castle was begun at Mauzun imitating the royal style introduced into the Auvergne by Philip.

Robert participated in the Albigensian Crusade with his own troops. In July 1209, he and Guy were among the leaders of the army that marched out of Lyon. They had returned to the Auvergne before the end of the year.

In 1211, according to the Chronicle of Bernard Ithier, a new dispute arose between Robert and Guy, during which the count destroyed the monastery of Saint-Pierre de Mozac. A royal army under Guy II of Dampierre and Archbishop Renaud of Lyon captured nearly all of Count Guy's possessions and confiscated his fiefs. This was the end of his disputes with his brother. In May 1212, a document issued by Robert indicates that Philip had given him the castle of Lezoux, the castle "between two rivers" (inter duos rivos) and that of Dallet.

In 1215, Robert again joined the Albigensian Crusade, this time accompanied by Géraud de Cros, archbishop of Bourges. He returned to his diocese in 1216. In 1217, with Countess Blanche of Champagne as his guarantor, he swore an oath of fealty to the king.

In 1217, as he was preparing to depart on the Fifth Crusade, Duke Odo III of Burgundy placed his six-year-old son and heir, the future Hugh IV, under the guardianship of Robert and William of Joinville. When Odo died suddenly in 1218, Robert became the guardian of the young duke.

In 1225, Robert attended the Council of Bourges. During his long episcopate in Clermont, the Franciscans set up in Montferrand and the Dominicans in Clermont itself (1219). He was succeeded at Clermont by his nephew, Hugh, in April 1227.

== Archbishop of Lyon ==
In 1227, Robert was elected to succeed Renaud de Forez (died 23 October 1226) as archbishop of Lyon in the Holy Roman Empire after a vacancy of several months. The papal bulls conferring on him the pallium and informing his suffragans of his election are dated 3 and 7 April 1227.

Robert has been accused of paying little attention to Lyon. Early in his pontificate, in his capacity as tutor to the young duke of Burgundy, he had advised Alice of Vergy, Hugh's mother and the regent of Burgundy, that Hugh should be married to Yolanda, daughter of Count Robert II of Dreux. This marriage alliance violated an agreement Alice had made with Count Theobald IV of Champagne. In response, a furious Theobald took Robert hostage in 1227. Yolanda's uncle and Robert's personal friend, Count Henry II of Bar, liberated the imprisoned bishop. By this stage of his career, Robert was an elderly and even "esteemed" man. In 1230, Theobald agreed to pay the bishop 1,000 marks of silver in compensation to the bishop.

Numerous documents and diplomas exist from Robert's pontificate in Lyon. He practised nepotism, appointing his nephew Hugh to the seneschalcy. He brokered an agreement between the monasteries of Saint-Martin d'Ainay and Saint-Martin de l'Île Barbe over the possession of Cuire. He imposed new taxes on wine, which caused the burgers of Lyon to complain and created the first stirrings of the communal movement in Lyon. The letter written by Pope Gregory IX to Robert on 28 September 1229 is an important witness to the evolution of the crusading movement, since for the first time Gregory offered the remission of sins to those who took part in the War of the Keys against the Emperor Frederick II.

Robert, calling himself "aged and ill", made out his will in 1232. He died on 7 January 1234 during a particularly harsh winter. He was buried in the cathedral of Lyon. There was a divided election following his death and the pope had to intervene to appoint an archbishop, Raoul de La Roche-Aymon, in 1235.

== Troubadour ==
Robert's sirventes in chansonnier D. The rubric (red text) reads los vesques de clermont.

Three poems by lo Vesques de Clarmon are known: two coblas and one sirventes. They can all be found in the Occitan chansonnier H, with the sirventes also preserved in chansonnier D. They are:

- Coms que vol enseignar
- Peire de Maensac, ges lo reis no seria
- Per Crist, si·l sirvens fos meus

All three pieces are directed against his cousin Dalfi. Coms que was written around 1199. Peire de Maensac, which is the sirventes and the only one longer than a single stanza, criticises Dalfi for anti-social behaviour and also criticises Dalfi's joglar, the Peire de Maensac of the opening line, for not acting like a knight. It can be dated to 1212 because of a reference to the Albigensian Crusade.

Per Crist and Dalfi's response are part of a private joke, full of innuendo. It can be dated no more precisely than between 1195 and 1209. The compiler of the chansonnier has supplied razos (explanations) for the lyrics, but these are certainly not based on an actual understanding of the reality that lies behind the text. He says that Robert loved the wife of Sir Chantart de Caulec from Pescadoires, based on his reading of Dalfi's poem. The bishop's poem, with strong sexual undertones, chides Dalfi for not supplying his lover with all the bacon she asked for. The first four lines are:

Per Crist, sil servens fos meus,
Dun cotel li dari al cor,
Can fez del bacon partida
A lei que lil queri tan gen.

Translation:

For Christ's sake, if the servant were mine
I'd give him a knife to the heart
For he gave only a part of the bacon
To her who asked him for it so graciously.

— trans. by William E. Burgwinkle

Outside of his and Dalfi's poems, Robert's feud with his brother is mentioned in a poem by Giraut de Borneil.

== Sources ==
- Areal, Thomas; Roques, Rémy (2016). Faire la guerre dans l'Auvergne des XII^{e}–XIII^{e} siècles: documents, histoire et écriture de l'histoire. XIV^{e} Rencontres romanes de Mozac: "La guerre médiévale: chevalerie, architecture et armes défensives", Club Historique Mozacois, septembre 2016. Mozac, France.
- Aston, Stanley C. (1974). "The Poems of Robert, Bishop of Clermont". In de Caluwé, Jacques; d'Heur, Jean-Marie; Dumas, René (eds.). Mélanges d'histoire litteraire, de linguistique et de philologie romanes offerts à Charles Rostaing. Vol. 1. Liège: Marche Romane. pp. 25–39.
- Aubrey, Elizabeth (1996). The Music of the Troubadours. Indiana University Press. ISBN 0-253-21389-4.
- Baldwin, John W. (1986). The Government of Philip Augustus: Foundations of French Royal Power in the Middle Ages. Berkeley: University of California Press.
- Burgwinkle, William E. (2019) [1990]. Razos and Troubadour Songs. London: Routledge.
- Galland, Bruno (1989). "Le rôle politique d'un chapitre cathédral: l'exercice de la juridiction séculière à Lyon, XII^{e}–XIV^{e} siècles". Revue d'histoire de l'Église de France. 75 (195): 273–296. doi:10.3406/rhef.1989.3472.
- Galland, Bruno (1994). Deux archevêchés entre la France et l'Empire: les achêvques de Lyon et les archevêques de Vienne, du milieu du XII^{e} siècle au milieu du XIV^{e} siècle. Rome: École française de Rome.
- Jones, John Winter (1844). "Auvergne, Gui II., Count d'". The Biographical Dictionary of the Society for the Diffusion of Useful Knowledge, Volume 4. London: Longman, Brown, Green, and Longmans. p. 236.
- Labouderie, Jean [in French] (1833). Chronologie des évêques de Clermont et des principaux événémens de l'histoire ecclésiastique de l'Auvergne. Clermont-Ferrand: Thibaud-Landriot.
- Lower, Michael (2005). The Barons' Crusade: A Call to Arms and Its Consequences. Philadelphia: University of Pennsylvania Press.
- Lucas, H. H. (1958). "Pons de Capduoill and Azalais de Mercuor: A Study of the Planh". Nottingham Medieval Studies. 2: 119–30. doi:10.1484/J.NMS.3.450.
- Marvin, Lawrence W. (2008). The Occitan War: A Military and Political History of the Albigensian Crusade, 1209–1218. Cambridge: Cambridge University Press.
- Monfalcon, Jean-Baptiste (1866). Histoire monumentale de la ville de Lyon. Vol. 5, pt 1. Paris: Firmin Didot.
- Poe, Elizabeth W. (1989). "Old Provençal Escars/Escas: "Poor"? Reconsidering the Reputation of Pons de Capdoill". Tenso. 4 (2): 37–58. doi:10.1353/ten.1989.0002. S2CID 143667682.
- Poe, Elizabeth W. (2005). "Lord Hermit and the Joglar from Velay: Peire de Maensac as the Author of Estat aurai de chantar (PC 194,7)". In Busby, Keith; Whalen, Logan E.; Guidot, Bernard (eds.). "De Sens Rassis": Essays in Honor of Rupert T. Pickens. Amsterdam: Editions Rodopi B.V. pp. 543–56. ISBN 90-420-1755-4.
- Prou, Maurice (1890). "Review of Les Registres de Grégoire IX". Revue critique d'histoire et de littérature. New series. 30 (2): 149–153.
- Raccagni, Gianluca (2016). "The Crusade Against Frederick II: A Neglected Piece of Evidence" (PDF). The Journal of Ecclesiastical History. 67 (4): 721–740. doi:10.1017/S002204691600066X.
- Rubellin, Michel (2003). Eglise et société chrétienne d'Agobard à Valdès. Lyon: Presses Universitaires de Lyon.
- Sharman, Ruth Verity, ed. (1989). The Cansos and Sirventes of the Troubadour, Giraut de Borneil: A Critical Edition. Cambridge: Cambridge University Press.
- Sumption, Jonathan (1978). The Albigensian Crusade. Faber and Faber.
- Taylor, Robert A. (2015). A Bibliographical Guide to the Study of Troubadours and Old Occitan Literature. Kalamazoo: Medieval Institute Publications.
- Whalen, Brett Edward (2019). The Two Powers: The Papacy, the Empire, and the Struggle for Sovereignty in the Thirteenth Century. Philadelphia: University of Pennsylvania Press.

Preceded by Gilbert	Bishop of Clermont; 1195–1227	Succeeded by Hugh of La Tour-du-Pin
Preceded by Renaud de Forez	Archbishop of Lyon; 1227–1234	Succeeded by Raoul de La Roche-Aymon
