= Eble V of Ventadorn =

Eble V of Ventadorn was viscount of Ventadour (Corrèze, France). He was the son of Eble IV and of Sybille de la Faye (daughter of Raoul de Châtellerault, grand seneschal of Aquitaine). His date of birth is unknown; he probably died soon after 1236.

Eble V was the great-grandson of Eble le chanteur, sometimes credited as a precursor of the troubadours.

Eble V's first wife was Marie de Limoges, born in 1170, daughter of Adhémar Boson, viscount of Limoges, and of Sarah de Cornouailles: they had a daughter, Dauphine or Alixène de Ventadour, who married Guillaume de Mercœur.

In 1186 Eble was married again, to Marguerite or Marie de Turenne (daughter of viscount Raymond II of Turenne and of Elise de Séverac). She is better known as Maria de Ventadorn, trobairitz and patron of troubadours. They had a son, Eble (VI), who married Dauphine de la Tour d'Auvergne, and a daughter, Alix or Alasia. Alix married Robert d'Auvergne, count of Clermont, a great-grandson of the long-lived Dauphin d'Auvergne.
