= Azalais de Porcairagues =

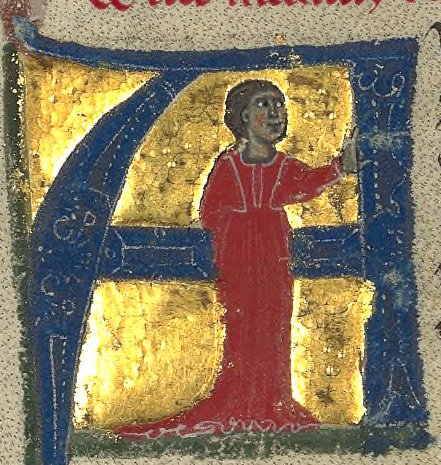
Azalais from a 13th-century chansonnier now in the Bibliothèque nationale de France.

Azalais de Porcairagues (also Azalaïs) or Alasais de Porcaragues was a trobairitz (woman troubadour), composing in Occitan in the late 12th century.

== Life ==
The sole source for her life is her vida, which tells us that she came from the country around Montpellier; she was educated and a gentlewoman; she loved Gui Guerrejat, the brother of William VII of Montpellier, and made many good songs about him; meaning, probably, that the one poem of hers known to the compiler had been addressed to Gui.

Gui was perhaps born around 1135; he fell ill early in 1178, became a monk, and died later in that year. Nothing is known of the dates of Azalais's birth and death. From her name, and from the statement in the Biographies cited above, it can be concluded that she came from the village of Portiragnes, just east of Béziers and about ten kilometers south of Montpellier, close to the territories that belonged to Gui and to his brothers. Aimo Sakari argues that she is the mysterious joglar ("jongleur") addressed in several poems by Raimbaut of Orange (a neighbour, and a cousin of Gui Guerrejat).

One poem attributed to Azalais, classically simple and emotional, survives today. As usually printed, it has fifty-two lines, but the text varies considerably between manuscripts, suggesting that it was not written down immediately on its composition. No music is attached to it. The poem alludes to the death in 1173 of Raimbaut of Orange; it was possibly first composed before that date and emended afterwards. The poem's envoi seems to mention Ermengarde of Narbonne (1143–1197), a well known patroness of troubadour poetry.

As observed by Sakari, the third strophe of the poem seems to contribute to a poetical debate begun by Guilhem de Saint-Leidier as to whether a lady is dishonoured by taking a lover who is richer than herself. Raimbaut of Orange also comments in his poem A mon vers dirai chanso. Soon afterwards there follows a partimen on the topic between Dalfi d'Alvernha and Perdigon, and then a tensó between Guiraut de Bornelh and king Alfonso II of Aragon.

== Excerpt ==
Ar em al freg temps vengut quel gels el neus e la fainga el aucellet estan mut, c'us de chanter non s'afrainga;	Now we are come to the cold time when the ice and the snow and the mud and the little birds are mute (for not one inclines to sing);

== Sources and bibliography ==
- Pierre Bec, Chants d'amour des femmes-troubadours: trobairitz et chansons de femme (Paris: Stock, 1995) pp. 65–70: complete poem in Occitan and French.
- Biographies des troubadours ed. J. Boutière, A.-H. Schutz (Paris: Nizet, 1964) pp. 341–2.
- A. Sakari, 'Azalais de Porcairagues, le "Joglar" de Raimbaut d'Orange' in Neuphilologische Mitteilungen vol. 50 (1949) pp. 23–43, 56–87, 174–198.
