= Elias d'Ussel =

Elias or Elyas d'Ussel or d'Uisel (fl. c. 1200) was a Limousin troubadour, the cousin of the three brothers Eble, Peire, and Gui, and co-castellan with them of the castle of Ussel-sur-Sarzonne, northeast of Ventadorn.

According to Gui's vida, Elias composed "good tensos. He has left behind four tensos, one partimen, and two coblas. He composed one series of verses with Gaucelm Faidit. The complete works of the four relations of Ussel, including Eble, were first compiled in one volume by J. Audiau as Les poésies des quatre troubadours d'Ussel (Paris, Delagrave, 1922). They are all available online at trobar.org.
