= Guy II of Auvergne =

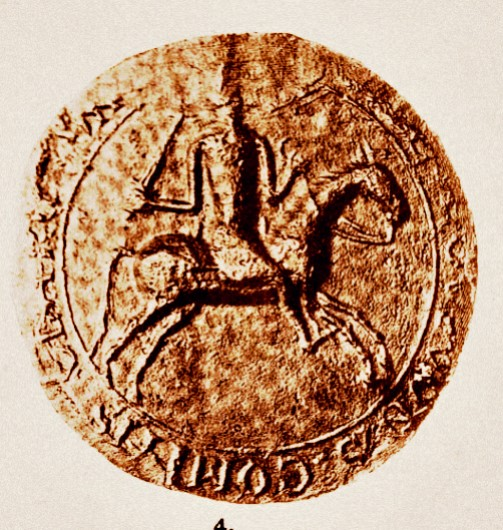
- Seal of Guy II

Count of Auvergne
- Reign: 1199-1222
- Predecessor: William IX of Auvergne
- Successor: William X of Auvergne
- Born: c.1165
- Died: 1222
- Spouse: Péronnelle de Chambon
- Issue: William X of Auvergne; Elise; Ermengarde of Auvergne; Marguerite of Auvergne
- House: House of Auvergne
- Father: Robert IV of Auvergne
- Mother: Mahaut of Burgundy

Guy II of Auvergne (c. 1165 – 1222) was the Count of Auvergne between 1199 and 1222. Like his predecessors, he was a vassal of the King of England during the first phase of his reign. In the second part of his reign, his County was invaded twice in 1196 and in 1210, by his neighbor King Philip August of France, after which the majority of Auvergne was annexed by the King of France.

== Biography ==
He was the second son of Count Robert IV of Auvergne and Matilda of Burgundy, a daughter of Odo II, Duke of Burgundy. He succeeded his elder brother William IX in 1199.

Guy was involved in the war between King Philip II Augustus of France and the English ruler of the "Angevin Empire", Richard the Lionheart. The latter was the direct feudal lord of Auvergne as Duke of Aquitaine, but allowed the count to rule largely independently.
In the spring of 1196, however, Richard the Lionheart ceded his sovereign rights over Auvergne to Philip II in the Treaty of Louviers, which meant that the French crown became the direct overlord of the counts of Auvergne rather than the indirect overlord. Guy was not prepared to recognize this new order, because he saw his independent position threatened by the French crown. He tried to consolidate his rule by building castles such as the Château de Tournoël and Châtel-Guyon ( literally : "Castle of Guy").
When the King invaded Auvergne and laid siege to Issoire, Guy and his cousin, the Dauphin Robert, called on Richard the Lionheart for help. Richard initially promised them his support, but then withheld it, in order not to endanger his peace with King Philip. When war between Richard the Lionheart and Philip II broke out again in the summer of 1196, Lionheart now asked Count Guy and Dauphin Robert to support him in battle. Both refused, because Lionheart had previously abandoned them.

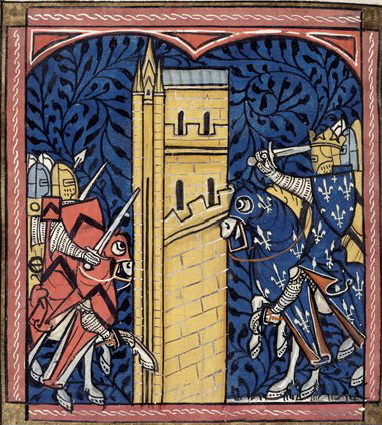
Philip II August of France in combat with Guy II, Count of Auvergne. (British Library, Royal 16 G VI f. 369v)

Guy's hostile attitude towards the French Crown also led to a conflict within his own family. In contrast to him, his brother, Bishop Robert of Clermont, supported the King, from whom he hoped to strengthen the episcopal position against the count's. In the civil war, Guy was excommunicated, but in return he was able to capture Bishop Robert in 1211. He also attacked several religious institutions, including the Royal Abbey of Saint-Pierre Mozac.
In response, the King sent an army under Guy of Dampierre to the Auvergne, which captured several castles. In December 1213, Guy's son was captured by the enemy at the fall of the Château de Tournoël, whereupon Guy was forced to surrender. He had to submit completely and was fully dispossessed. Only his son received a significantly reduced part of the Auvergne back, the rest remained in the possession of the French Crown as Terre Royale d'Auvergne.

After his death, Guy was buried in the Monastery of Le Bouschet-Vauluisant (Manzat).

=== Crusade against the Cathars ===
According to the "Canso de la Crozada" by William of Tudela, Guy led the first military actions of the Albigensian Crusade in May 1209. Together with the Viscount of Turenne, the Archbishop of Bordeaux and the Bishops of Limoges, Agen and Cahors, he led a crusader army into the Quercy region, which belonged to Raymond VI, Count of Toulouse, who was exiled at the time. After they had taken over smaller towns, they laid siege to the castle of Casseneuil. The Cathars present in the town were burned on the stake. But when the minimum fighting period for crusaders of forty days had passed, they ended the operation and retreated to their lands. A few months later, the main army of the crusade set out, but Guy did not take part.

=== Marriage and Children ===
Guy II of Auvergne married Péronnelle de Chambon, who brought him the barony of Combrailles through the marriage.
They had four children:

- William X of Auvergne (1195–1247),
- Elise (1190–1222), married Raymond IV of Turenne,
- Ermengarde of Auvergne (1196–1225), engaged to Guigues IV of Forez, marriage canceled,
- Marguerite of Auvergne (1200–1263).

== Sources ==
- Baluze, Preuves de l'Histoire généalogique de la maison d'Auvergne, tome 2.
- Preuves de l'Histoire généalogique de la maison d'Auvergne.
- Justel, Histoire généalogique de la maison d'Auvergne.
- Chroniques de Saint-Martial de Limoges.
- Baluze, Preuves de l'Histoire généalogique de la maison d'Auvergne, tome 1.
- Layettes du trésor des chartes : de l'année 1224 à l'année 1246.
- Obituarium Lugdunensis ecclesiæ.

French nobility
Preceded by William IX	Count of Auvergne; 1199–1222	Succeeded by William X
