= Raymond IV =

Raymond IV may refer to:

- Raymond IV of Pallars Jussà (count, 1047–1098)
- Raymond IV, Count of Toulouse (r. 1094 - 1105), also count of Tripoli (1102–1105)
- Raymond IV, Count of Tripoli (r. 1187–1189)
- Raymond IV of Turenne (c. 1187 – c. 1243), viscount
