= Raymond III =

Raymond III may refer to:

- Raymond III, Count of Toulouse (10th century)
- Raymond III of Rouergue (count, 961–c.1008)
- Raymond III of Pallars Jussà (count, 1011–1047)
- Raymond III of Tripoli (count, r. 1152–1187)
- Raymond III of Turenne (died 1219), viscount
