= Eble IV of Ventadorn =

12th century viscount of Ventadour

Eble IV was viscount of Ventadour (Corrèze, France) in the 12th century. He was the son of Eble III of Ventadorn (died 1170) and Alais, daughter of William VI of Montpellier and elder sister of William VII.

Eble IV married Sybille de la Faye (daughter of Raoul de Châtellerault, grand seneschal of Aquitaine) and had eight children, one of whom was to be Eble V and was to marry Marie de Turenne, better known as Maria de Ventadorn, a trobairitz and patron of troubadours.
