= Eble d'Ussel =

Eble or Ebles d'Ussel (also d'Ussèl or d'Uisel; fl. c. 1200) was a Limousin troubadour, the eldest of three brothers, castellans of the castle of Ussel-sur-Sarzonne, northeast of Ventadorn. His younger brothers were Peire and Gui and he also had a cousin named Elias, all troubadours. Of his corpus only one tenso, one partimen (with Guilhem Ademar), and a cobla survive. The only sources for his life, besides his own songs, are the vida of his brother Gui and a document recording the donation of land to the abbey of Bonaigue by two brothers Guido and Eblo Usseli. According to Gui's vida, Eble composed "bad tensos".

The complete works of the four relations of Ussel, including Eble, were first compiled in one volume by J. Audiau as Les poésies des quatre troubadours d'Ussel (Paris, Delagrave, 1922). They are all available online at trobar.org.
