= Eble III of Ventadorn =

Eble III of Ventadorn was viscount of Ventadour (Corrèze, France). He was the son of Eble II, known as Eble le chanteur (Eble the singer), and of Agnes de Montluçon. His date of birth is unknown; he died in 1170.

Eble III was the patron and protector of Bernart de Ventadorn, one of the earliest troubadours whose works survive.

In 1148 he married Marguerite de Turenne, daughter of Raymond, viscount of Turenne and of Mathilde du Perche. They had one daughter, Matabrune. This marriage had ended before 1150, when Marguerite remarried: she died in 1173.

Meanwhile, before 1156, Eble married Alais, daughter of William VI of Montpellier and elder sister of William VII. They had a son, Eble. This son, who became Eble IV of Ventadorn, married Sybille de la Faye (daughter of Raoul de Châtellerault, grand seneschal of Aquitaine) and had eight children, one of whom was to be Eble V and was to marry Marie de Turenne, better known as Maria de Ventadorn, a trobairitz and patron of troubadours.
