= Gaucelm Faidit =

12th-century French troubadour

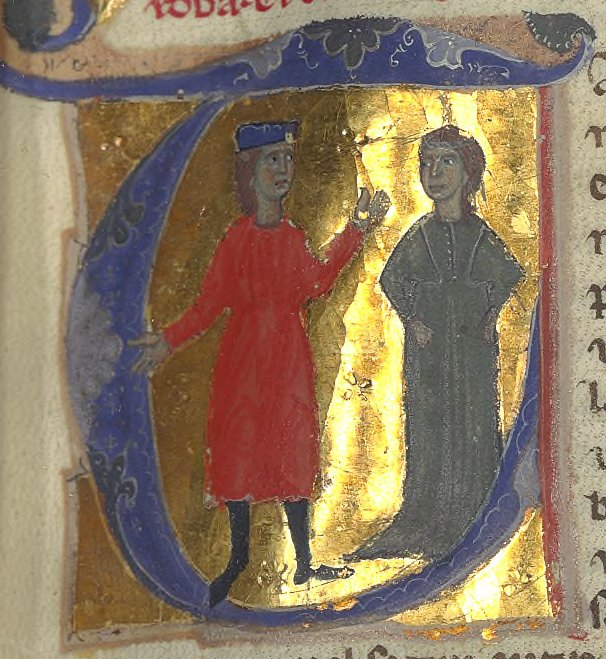
Gaucelm Faidit and Guillelma Monja, from a manuscript in the Bibliothèque Nationale

Gaucelm Faidit (Old Occitan: [ɡawˈtʃɛlm fajˈdit] literally "Gaucelm the Dispossessed" c. 1156 – c. 1209) was a troubadour, born in Uzerche, in the Limousin, from a family of knights in service of the count of Turenne. He travelled widely in France, Spain, and Hungary. His known patrons include Geoffrey II, Duke of Brittany and Dalfi d'Alvernha; he was also at one time in Poitiers at the court of Richard I of England, for whose death he wrote a famous planh (lament) in 1199. It is possible, though controversial, that Gaucelm took part in the Third Crusade from 1189–1191; it seems clear that in 1202 he set out on the Fourth Crusade, as did his then-patron, Boniface of Montferrat, but after 1202 there is no further historical trace of Gaucelm.

Three sources – the anonymous vida (biography) of Gaucelm, an exchange of verses between Gaucelm and Elias d'Ussel, and the satirical sirventes on rival troubadours by the Monk of Montaudon – allege that Gaucelm married a prostitute. According to the vida, her name was Guillelma Monja: "she was very beautiful and well educated" and accompanied her husband on Crusade. The vida also claims that Gaucelm was rather fat, and that after their marriage, Guillelma also put on weight.

About seventy of Gaucelm's poems and fourteen of his melodies survive. Six poems are addressed to Boniface of Montferrat, and twelve to Maria de Ventadorn. Several of his poems are accompanied in the manuscripts by detailed explanations (razós), usually concerning love affairs and rivalries that allegedly inspired the poems. These tales involve Gaucelm with Hugh IX of Lusignan, his son Hugh X, Alfonso II, Count of Provence, and others.
