= Guilhem Ademar =

French troubador

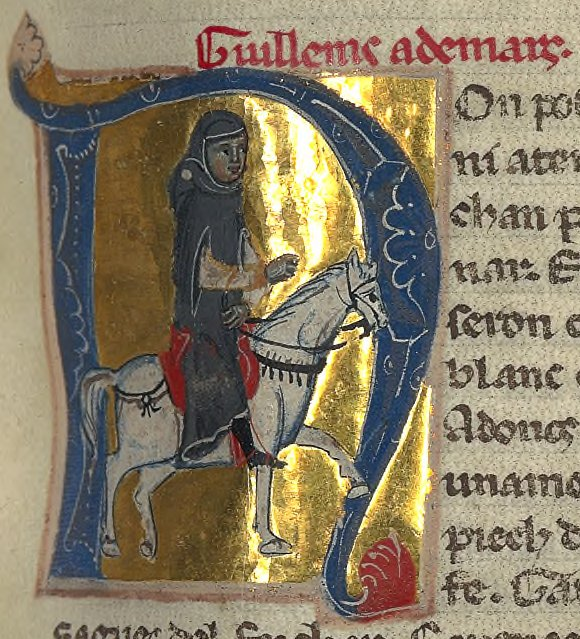
Miniature of Guilhem from a 13th-century Lombard chansonnier (BnF ms. 12473)

Guilhem Ademar (Old Occitan: [ɡiˈʎɛm adeˈmaɾ]; also spelled Guillem, Adamar, or Azemar; fl. 1190/1195–1217) was a troubadour from the Gévaudan in France. He travelled between the courts of Albi, Toulouse, Narbonne, and Spain. He achieved fame enough during his life to be satirised by the nobleman and monk, Monge de Montaudon. Guilhem entered holy orders towards the end of his life. Sixteen poems—fourteen cansos, a sirventes, and a partimen with Eble d'Ussel—form his surviving corpus. His cansos are his most famous pieces. Usually humorous, several mock the poetry of Ademar's more illustrious contemporary Arnaut Daniel. One canso survives with a tune.

== Life ==
According to his vida, Guilhem was the son of a poor knight from Meyrueis (Maruois), the lord of which castle created him a knight. He was an eloquent man who "knew well how to invent (trobaire) poetry." When he was no longer able to support himself as a knight he took to minstrelsy and "was greatly honoured by all the high society." Towards the end of his life he joined the Order of Grandmont (Granmon).

Guilhem Ademar's career can be dated from a reference in a poetic satire of contemporary troubadours by the Monge de Montaudon around 1195. The Monge playfully insults Guilhem as a "bad joglar" who always wears old clothes and whose lady has thirty lovers. The earliest reference to a W. Ademars, a petty noble of the Gévaudan, occurs in 1192, though this figure, who (variously as Ademars or Azemars) appears in documents until 1217, cannot be definitively identified with the troubadour.

== Works ==
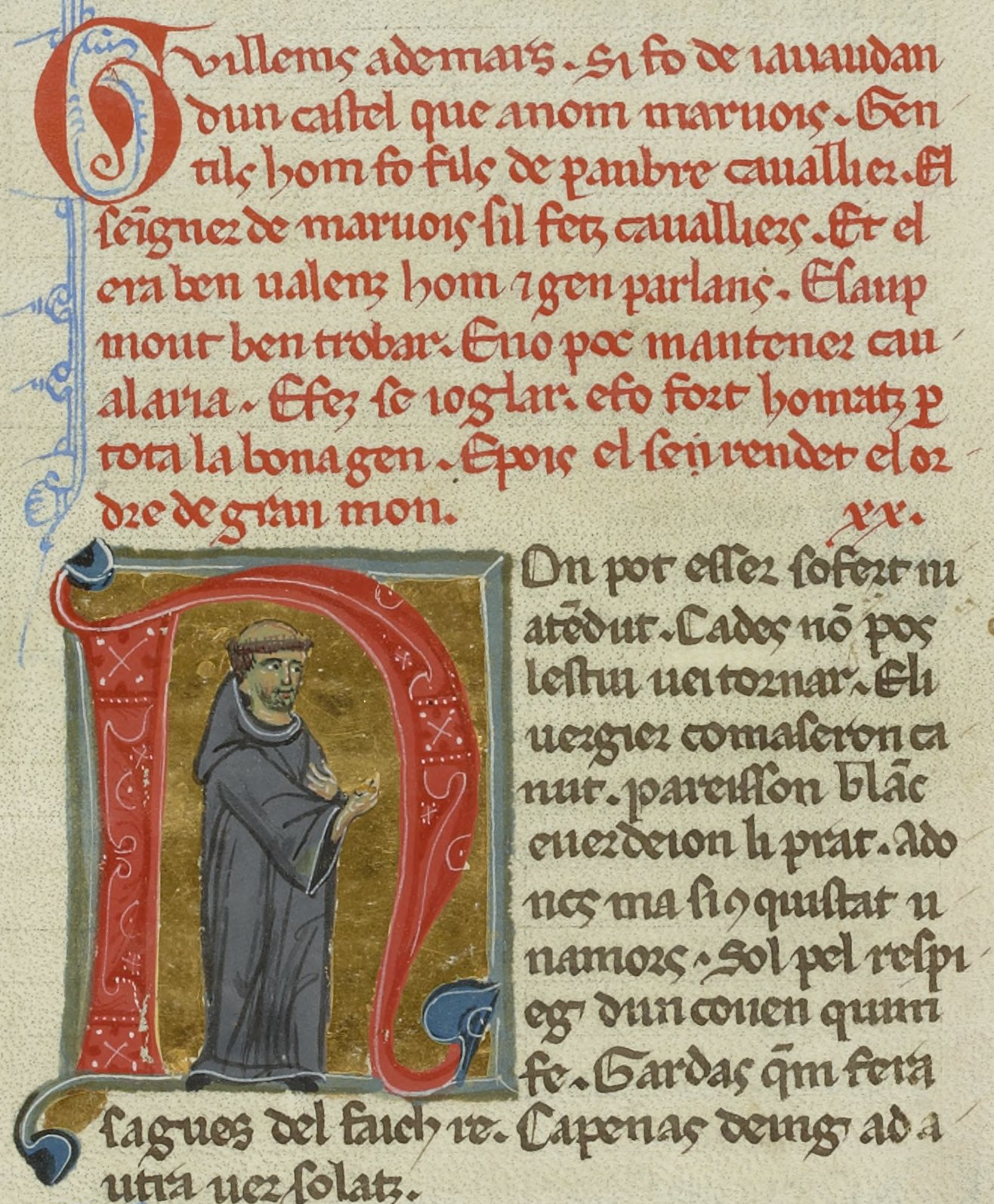
Guillem as a monk. The text of his vida is in red above him (BnF ms. 854).

One of Guilhem's more famous pieces is Non pot esser sofert ni atendut, a sensuous canso of courtly love wherein he is wishing that his lady's husband would go far away. It has presented a riddle for its dating through references to two Spanish kings: a rey Ferrans ("king Ferdinand") and reis N'Amfos, cui dopton li masmut / e.l mieiller coms de la crestiantat ("king Don Alfonso, whom the Almohads fear / and the greatest count in Christendom"). Ferrans may be either Ferdinand II of León (died 1188) or Ferdinand III of Castile (began reigning in 1217), both of whom present difficulties because their reigns lie outside the usual dating of Guilhem's career. The Alfonso could be Alfonso II of Aragon (contemporary with Ferdinand II), who was also the Count of Barcelona. It could also be Alfonso IX of León, Ferdinand II's successor, whose kingdom lay about as far away as Guilhem could possibly hope to send his lover's husband; or Alfonso VIII of Castile, whose exploits against the Almohads culminated in the definitive victory at Las Navas in 1212. Since Guilhem wrote a poem sometime between 1215 and 1217 in which he referred to Raymond VI of Toulouse as En Raimon, mon seigner ("Lord Raymond, my lord"), it has also been posited that the mieiller coms referred to in the previous work is Raymond, who was with Alfonso at Las Navas in 1212. Guilhem may thus have had in mind the events of Las Navas and been writing at a time after Ferdinand III's succession. Guilhem may have even been at Las Navas with Raymond.

Guilhem's poetry is in general light, easy-going, and characterised by irony. Like Peire Raimon, his contemporary at the court of Raymond VI of Toulouse, he seems to have been influenced by (and perhaps had an influence on) Arnaut Daniel. Guilhem's lone surviving piece of music is neumatic in texture and motivic in phrasing.

In his primary love songs, Guilhem praises two ladies, one from Albi (Na Bona Nasques, a pet name) and another from Narbonne (Beatriz, perhaps her real name). Despite this, Guilhem has been accused of misogyny for his poem El temps d'estui, qan par la flors el bruoill. His love song Ben for'oimais sazos e locs is written as a message to his lover to be delivered by her porter, who is strictly warned to follow through. In his only sirventes, Ieu ai ja vista manhta rey, Guilhem moralises in a slightly Marcabrunian fashion on how loyal and generous suitors are rejected in favour "fools and misers".

== Sources ==
- Aubrey, Elizabeth. The Music of the Troubadours. Indiana University Press, 1996. ISBN 0-253-21389-4.
- Egan, Margarita, ed. and trans. The Vidas of the Troubadours. New York: Garland, 1984. ISBN 0-8240-9437-9.
- Riquer, Martín de. Los trovadores: historia literaria y textos. 3 vol. Barcelona: Planeta, 1975.
