= Château de Tournoël =

Medieval castle in Puy-de-Dôme, France

Coordinates: 45.8850°N 3.0383°E

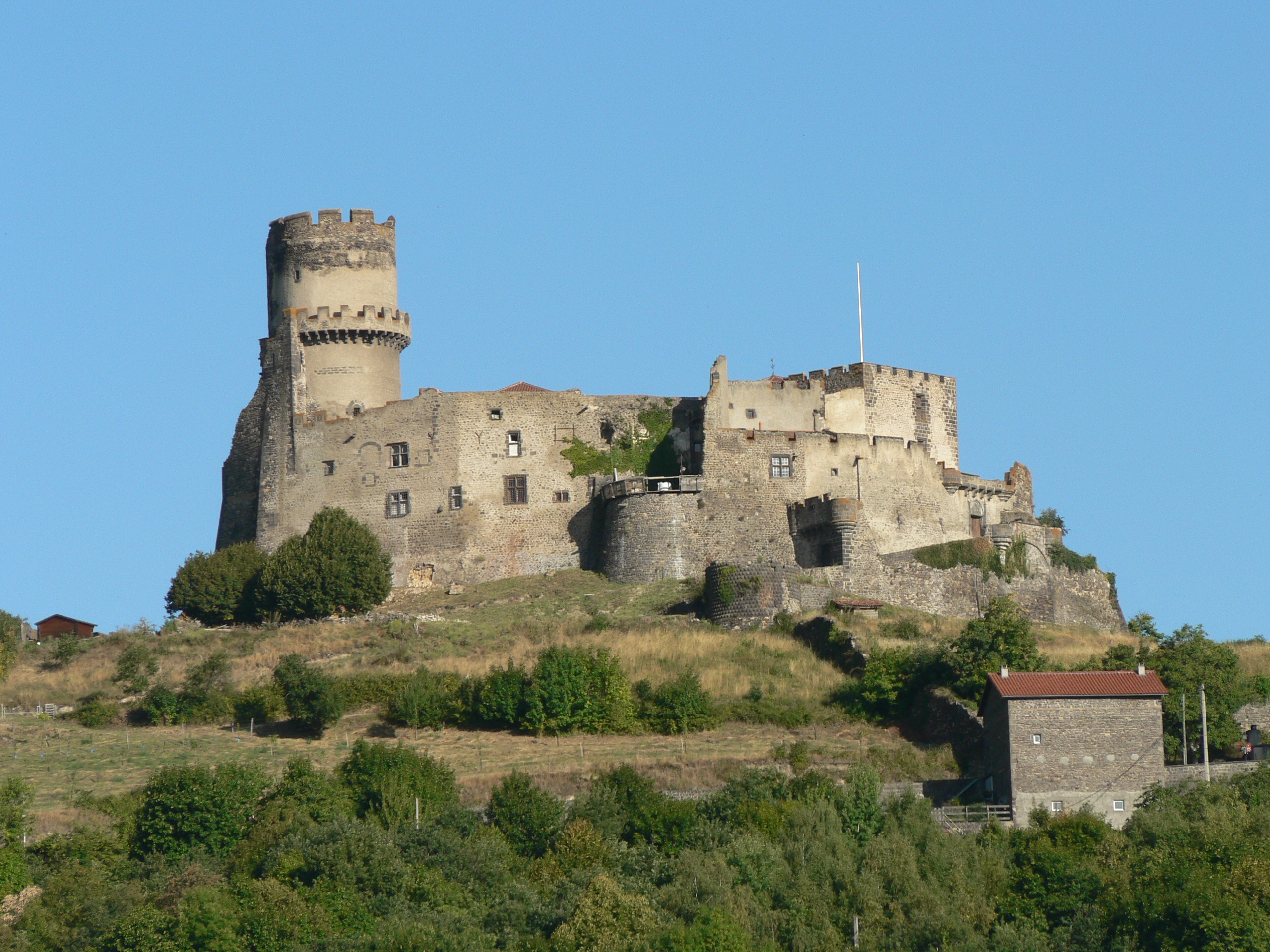
Château de Tournoël

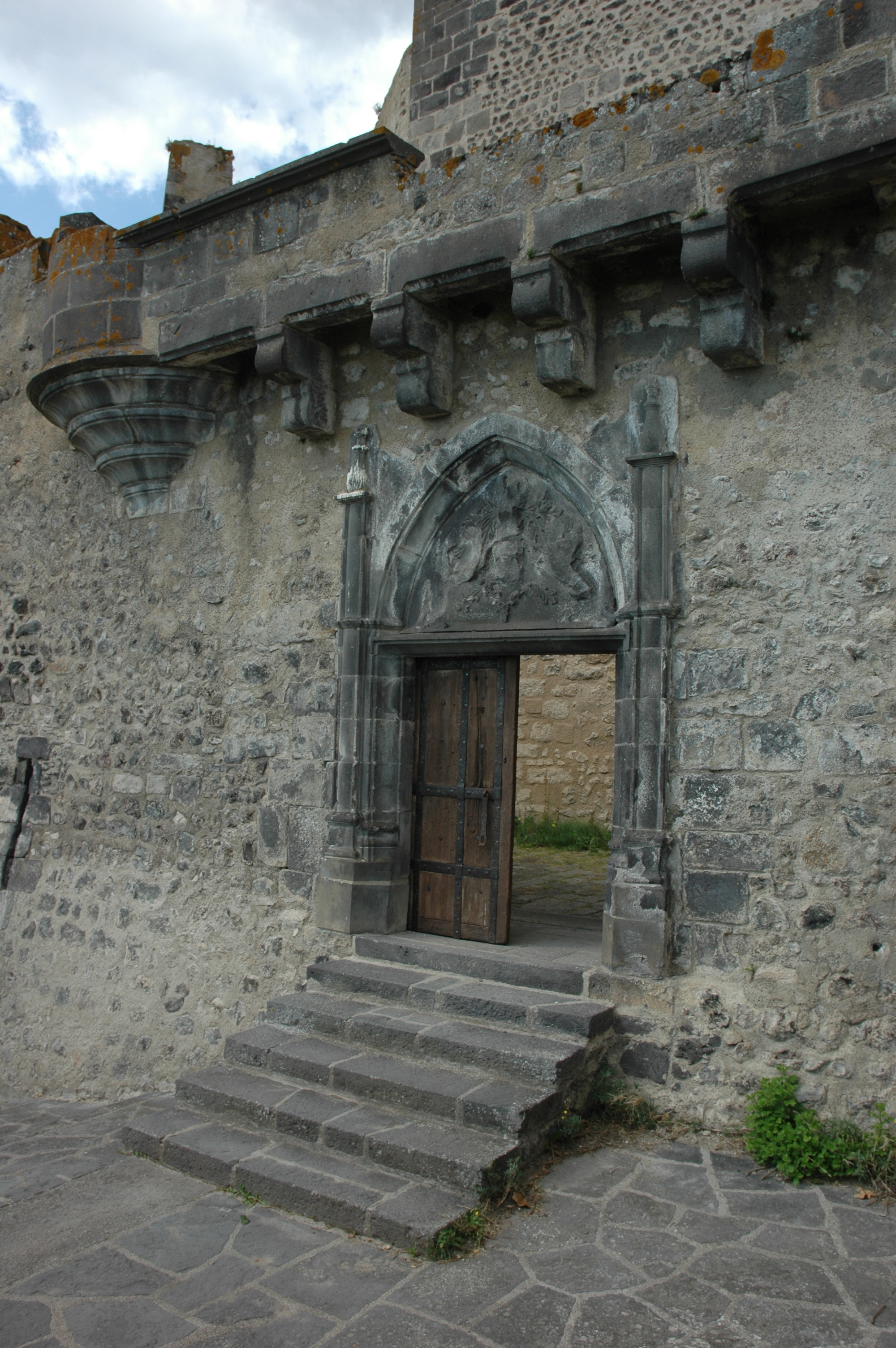
Château de Tournoël

The Château de Tournoël is a medieval fortified castle partly in ruins in the commune of Volvic, in the Puy-de-Dôme département of France. The castle is located on a rocky mountain spur at an altitude of 594 m in the foothills of the Puy de la Bannière which dominates the Limagne plains (about 350 m altitude above the level of Riom).

The Château de Tournoël is privately owned and has been listed as a monument historique by the French Ministry of Culture since 1889.

== Strategic location ==
The castle, by dominating the Limagne plains, watched over the surroundings of the “bonne ville” (which means a town with a peculiar status with the king) of Riom which was the commercial and legal capital city of the Basse-Auvergne, and the royal Mozac Abbey. Therefore, Tournoël was, within a radius of 5 km, a seigniorial anti-establishment in this group of three consular, royal and religious powers.

Its isolation on this volcanic overhang also ensured a better safety in case of withdrawal. Moreover, the castle was known to be “unassailable” or “impregnable, defended on the outside by extremely high slopes, very deep valleys, multiple towers and walls, filled with armed men and supplies” as described by William the Breton at the beginning of the 13th century.

== History ==
=== Bertrand of Tournoël ===
The castle’s early background is unknown because no document exists before the 11th century. The first documented owner of Tournoël dates back to between 1076 and 1096 and is in a document kept in the regional archives of the Puy-de-Dôme. In this certificate, Bertrannus (Bertrand in French), Lord of “Tournoile” (toponym at that time), had taken the church of Cébazat that he gave back to the cathedral chapter of Clermont.

=== Tournoël, property of the rulers of Auvergne ===
Arms of Guy II and of comtes d'Auvergne : or a gonfanon gueules frangé de vert

The family of the rulers of Auvergne took possession of the castle at an unknown date. Guy II of Auvergne owned it from at least 1190.

Whereas Guy II favored the claims of Richard the Lionheart to the Auvergne, his brother Robert, bishop of Clermont, sided with King Philip-Augustus. The tensions between the two brothers led to the imprisonment of Robert at Tournoël in 1199.

At the end of 1212, the French king sent his army led by Guy of Dampierre, lord of Bourbon, who besieged and took the castle. Guy II lost almost all of his possessions in Auvergne, only keeping the region around Vic-le-Comte. Philip-Augustus ordered the restitution of the assets belonging to the Mozac Abbey.

This event — the siege of Tournoël — allowed for the first time the annexation of the Basse-Auvergne to the crown lands. The territories seized by the king were called "lands of Auvergne".

=== A royal castle ===
Arms of Guy II de Dampierre : gueules two léopards or

In 1213, Guy de Dampierre took possession of the castle for the king, to whom he sent an inventory of the castle in a letter dated 20 December 1213.

Guy de Dampierre died on 18 January 1216. His son and successor, Archambaud VIII, retained ownership of Tournoël by the King's decision.

Arms of Alphonse de Poitiers : parti d'azur semé de fleurs de lys d'or et de gueules semés de château d'or

In 1225, King Louis VIII planned to convey his Auvergne possessions to his son Alphonse de Poitiers, who was made for the purpose Count of Auvergne. The County of Auvergne, just like the counties of Poitiers and Saintonge, was conceded as appanage. Alphonse took possession of the lands of Auvergne on his majority in 1241. The city of Riom became the capital of Lower Auvergne and, in 1270, Alphonse granted it a charter, called the "Alphonsine". Prince Alphonse stayed several times in his castle at Riom but also at Tournoël in 1251. Following his death in 1271, the land of Auvergne returned to the Crown of France.

=== The exchange with the heirs of Geraud Maulmont ===
Arms of the family of Maumont : azur, au sautoir or flanked by four towers argent maçonnées sable

In 1306, King Philip the Fair concluded an agreement with the heirs of Geraud Maulmont (or Maumont), a noble Limousin family who owned Saint-Julien-Maumont. Tournoël Châteauneuf and part of the lordship of Cébazat were exchanged for strategic places between Limousin and Périgord, such as Bourdeilles, Chalus Chabrol, Châlus Maulmont (both located in the present town of Chalus), to better counter the English domain of Aquitaine and thus strengthening the border.

Pierre de Maumont officially became lord of Tournoël on 12 February 1313. He died in 1345 and had only one daughter, Martha, who took the castle to her husband, Gerald, lord of Roche Limousin.

=== The de La Roche family ===
Shield of the De La Roche family

Géraud de La Roche died on an unknown date. His son Hugues de La Roche became the owner.

Hugues
In 1343, Hugues married Dauphine Rogier, the niece of Pope Clement VI and the sister of the future Pope Gregory XI. Thereby, Hugues became Rector of the Comtat Venaissin and Marshall of the Papal Court. In 1359, he was named Captain general of Basse-Auvergne and fought against England during the Hundred Years’ War. He died in 1398, with the title of Great Lord Chancellor of France.

Hugues de La Roche reinforced the fortifications of the castle, especially the big circular 13th century keep, adding to it a chemin de ronde about two-thirds of its height, supported by machicolations.

Nicolas
His son, Nicolas de la Roche, took over from him in 1398. In 1404, he married Alix de Chauvigny, daughter of Chateau Rocher's lord. Their oldest son, Jean de La Roche, married Louise de La Fayette (daughter of Marshal Gilbert Motier de La Fayette) in 1419 and inherited Tournoël subject to an usufruct. He was killed during the Battle of Verneuil in August 1424 at the age of 22. He was survived by three children. When Nicolas died in 1428, his other sons claimed the property of Tournoël from Jean's widow. Château de Tournoël was sequestered by the seneschal until a judicial settlement. In 1429, the castle was given to the widow, Louise de La Fayette, and her children: the eldest, Antoine de La Roche, acquired the castle at the age of majority.

Antoine
Antoine de La Roche lived in Tournoël with Jeanne de Vieuville (cousin of Agnès Sorel) whom he had married in 1448. During this period the couple embellished the inside architecture of the fortress to change it into a residency. When the nobles rose up against Louis XI, creating the League of the Public Weal, Antoine de La Roche did not join Charles the Bold's followers. Louis XI rewarded him by naming him advisor and chamberlain of the court. A competition began between him and his suzerain, John II, Duke of Bourbon, who did participate in the League of the Public Weal. In 1478, as Antoine refused to give homage to him, John II of Bourbon sent him to jail in Moulins, then to the Conciergerie of Paris. The Duke of Bourbon put Tournoël under sequestration and his guards occupied it. On that occasion a detailed inventory of all furnitures was made. Two years later, in 1480, the Duke was ordered to return the castle to Antoine de La Roche by the Parliament of Paris but he seized it once again in 1487 giving as an excuse that people had been manhandled. One year later this seizure was nullified.

Antoine died in 1493.

Jean
His son Jean succeeded him. He was the husband of Françoise Talaru (Foréz family). He died in 1501 leaving only a daughter:

Charlotte
Charlotte de la Roche de Tournoelle married in 1509 Jean d'Albon (b. 1472 - d. 1559), son of Guichard, lord of Saint-André and Anne de Saint-Nectaire. They had a daughter Marguerite, and two sons, Jacques (Marshal of France) and François (Bishop of Limoges).

== See also ==
- List of castles in France
