= Boso II =

Boso II may refer to:

- Boso II of Arles (died 965/967), count of Avignon and Arles
- Boso II of La Marche (died 1008), count of La Marche and Périgord
- Boso II of Turenne (r. 1122–1143), viscount of Turenne
- Boso II (bishop of Aosta) (fl. 1143–1147), bishop of Aosta
- Boso II of Challant (died 1210), viscount of Aosta

== See also ==
- Boso I
- Boso III
