= Guilhem de Saint-Leidier =

12th-century French troubadour

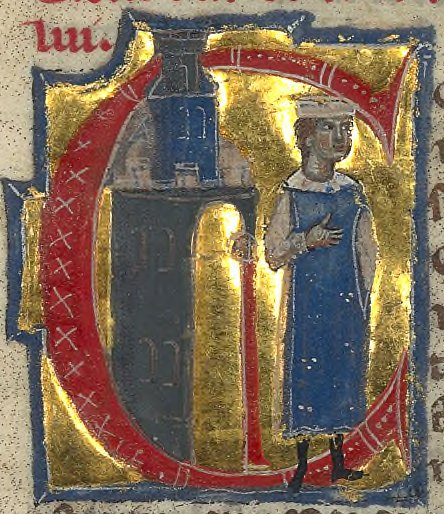
Guilhem is depicted next to a castle in the manuscript that contains his vida

Guilhem de Saint-Leidier, also spelled Guilhem de Saint Deslier, Guillem de Saint Deidier and Guilhèm de Sant Leidier was a troubadour of the 12th century, composing in Occitan. He was lord of Saint-Didier-en-Velay, was born at some date before 1150, and died between 1195 and 1200. He was said to have loved Belissende, sister of Dalfi d'Alvernha and wife of Eracle III of Polignac, Guilhem's feudal overlord.

His known work includes fifteen cansos, one tensó and one planh. Indications in the text and in his vida suggest that he worked in Gascony, Comminges, the Agenais, and the Bordelais. He is the first poet named in the poetical survey by the Monk of Montaudon, written around 1195.

With one of his poems Guilhem began a poetical debate on the question whether a lady is dishonoured by taking a lover who is richer or more powerful than herself. The one known poem by the trobairitz Azalais de Porcairagues appears to contribute to this debate, as does one by her friend Raimbaut of Orange, A mon vers dirai chanso. Soon afterwards there is a partimen on the topic between Dalfi d'Alvernha and Perdigon, and then a tensó between Guiraut de Bornelh and king Alfonso II of Aragon.

Guilhem's daughter's son, Gauseran, was also a troubadour.

== Bibliography ==
- A. Sakari, Poésies du troubadour Guillem de Saint-Didier. Helsinki, 1956.
- A. Sakari, 'Azalais de Porcairagues, le "Joglar" de Raimbaut d'Orange' in Neuphilologische Mitteilungen vol. 50 (1949) pp. 23–43, 56-87, 174-198.
- Biographies des troubadours ed. J. Boutière, A.-H. Schutz (Paris: Nizet, 1964) pp. 271–283.
