= Eble I of Ventadorn =

Viscount of Ventadour

Eble I (died 1096) was viscount of Ventadour (Corrèze, France). He married Almodis de Montberon and his children included Eble II of Ventadorn.
