= William IX of Auvergne =

Count of Auvergne
- Reign: 1194-1198?
- Predecessor: Robert IV of Auvergne
- Successor: Guy II of Auvergne
- Died: ca. 1198?
- House: House of Auvergne
- Father: Robert IV of Auvergne
- Mother: Mahaut of Burgundy

William IX of Auvergne (died ca. 1198?) was count of Auvergne.

== Life ==
He was the son of Robert IV of Auvergne and Mahaut of Burgundy.

The only source about him is Alberic of Trois-Fontaines's chronicle, which states that he was the count of Auvergne and the brother of Guy II of Auvergne and Robert of Auvergne.

Since his brother is first recorded as count in 1198, it is assumed that he died or abdicated around that time.

French nobility
Preceded by Robert IV	Count of Auvergne ca. 1194–1198	Succeeded by Guy II
