= Viscounty of Turenne =

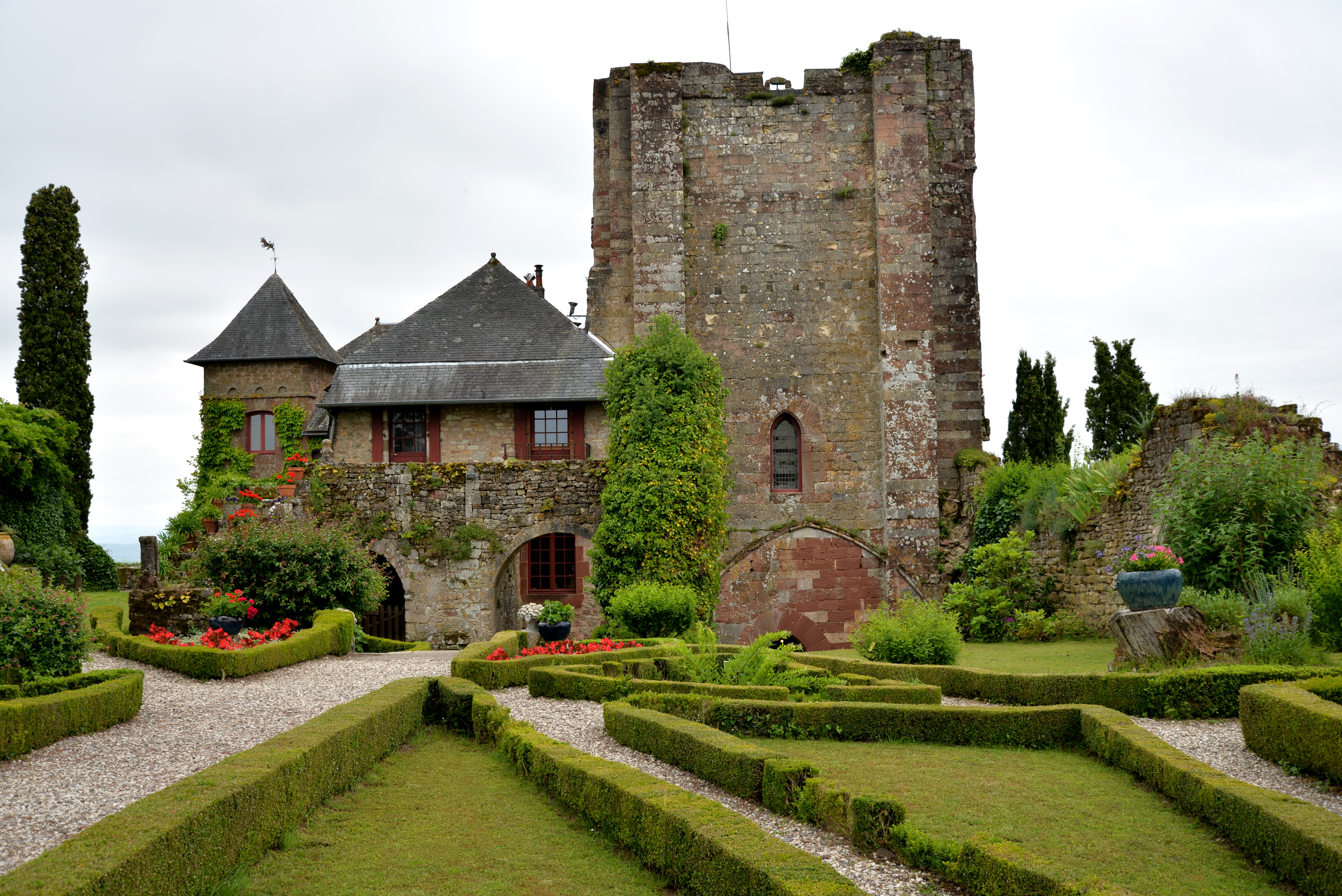
Château de Turenne today

The Viscounty of Turenne was a viscounty in France between the 10th century and 1738, when it was sold to the Crown. Its seat was the Château de Turenne in the lower Limousin.

== Origins ==
The earliest attestation of what would become the viscounty of Turenne is found in Odo of Cluny's biography of Gerald of Aurillac. One of Gerald's opponents was Godfrey, described as count of Turenne. He was descended from the counts of Quercy, which county was annexed to the county of Toulouse in 852. As Odo was writing about half a century after the events he recounts, his terminology may be anachronistic.

The first explicit referred to as viscount of Turenne is Bernard. A document from the abbey of Tulle dated 947 or 948, shows him to have been an illegitimate son of Ademar I, also called viscount. In 984, the widowed viscountess Deda made a donation to Tulle in the name of her late husband and son, Bernard and Ademar II, both called viscounts. The succession to Turenne was disputed between Bernard's sons-in-law: Ramnulf Cabridel, the viscount of Aubusson and husband of Aina, and Archambaud I, the viscount of Comborn and husband of Sulpicia.

== Partition ==
Viscount Raymond IV did homage for some fiefs to Count Raymond VII of Toulouse in 1236. In the act of homage, he declared that neither he nor his predecessors had ever done homage to any king of France. When he died in 1243, his heir was his daughter Alix, who was married to Hélie Rudel II, lord of Bergerac. Turenne was seized by her uncle, Raymond V. In June 1251, a compromise between the parties was reached under the auspices of the queen regent, Blanche of Castile.

As a result, the viscounty was partitioned between Alix and her cousin Raymond VI. Alix and Hélie Rudel received the castles of Ribérac, Epeluche, Montfort, Aillac, Carlux, Terrasson and Larche; the lordships of Souillac and of the castle of Salignac; the port of Creysse; the places of Jayac and La Cassagne and half of Martel; and the homages owed by the abbot of Sarlat and by the vassals of Carlux, Terrasson, Salignac and Larche. The right to mint money was confirmed to Raymond VI by Blanche and later by King Henry III of England as duke of Aquitaine (1263) and by King Philip III of France as sovereign (1280).

== Territory and size ==
The viscounts gradually expanded their holdings between the Vézère and the Dordogne rivers, acquiring a number of parishes from the counties of Limousin, Quercy and Périgord. The viscounty was partitioned in 1251 and part of it sold in 1350, but it reached its greatest extent in 1442. In 1645, its territory was roughly 30 leagues long and 12–13 leagues wide. In the follow decades it was gradually broken up and sold off. When acquired by the Crown in 1738, it measured approximately seven by eight leagues and encompassed seven towns and 1,200 villages or hamlets. Its population was 18,500 households.

== Rights ==
The viscounts acquired many privileges from the kings of France and of England. They owed no monetary dues nor military contributions to the Crown. They had the right to administer justice, to collect tolls, mint coint, issue safe conducts and to convoke their estates. They held these prerogatives down to 1738. Their subjects, on the other hand, had only the right to assemble as the estates when convoked and so assembled to vote on taxes and their apportionment. In the final century and a half of the viscounty's existence, when the viscount did not reside in Turenne, the total tax burden rose from 3,500 livres to 100,000.

== Sale ==
When Charles Godefroy, duc de Bouillon, acquired the viscounty of Turenne as part of his inheritance in 1730, he also took on six million francs in debt. On 8 May 1738, he sold the viscounty to King Louis XV for 4.2 million francs. The negotiations for the sale were conducted by Charles Godefroy's tutor, Claude Linotte, and the minister of finances, Philibert Orry. When Orry offered Linotte a bribe of 40,000 livres, Linottoe reported it to Charles Godefroy, who matched it by granting Linotte a life annuity of 2,000 livres and, by a contract signed on 22 April 1738, an annuity of 1,000 livres to Linotte, his wife and their heirs. This annuity obligation, the rente Linotte, still exists and is included in the French budget.

== List of viscounts ==
- Ademar I ... before 948
- Bernard ... fl. 947/8
- Ademar II ... before 984

Succession disputed by Bernard's sons-in-law:

- Aina
  - Ramnulf Cabridel of Aubusson, jure uxoris
- Sulpicia
  - Archambaud I of Comborn, jure uxoris

House of Comborn

- Eble ... 988/999 – after 1030
- William ... after 1030 – before 1074
- Boso I ... before 1074 – 1091
- Raymond I ... 1091–1122
- Boso II ... 1122–1143
- Raymond II ... 1143–1191
- Boso III ... 1191–1197/1200
- Raymond III ... 1197/1200–1212?
- Raymond IV ... 1212?–1243
- Raymond V ... 1243–1245
- Raymond VI ... 1245–1285
- Raymond VII ... 1285–1304
- Margaret ... 1304–1335
  - Bernard VIII of Comminges ... 1304–1335, jure uxoris

House of Comminges

- John ... 1335–1339
- Cecilia ... 1339–1350

House of Roger de Beaufort

- Guillaume III Roger de Beaufort ... 1350–1396
- Raymond VIII de Beaufort ... 1395–1413
- Antoinette de Beaufort ... 1413–1416
- Aliénor de Beaufort ... 1416–1420
- Amanieu de Beaufort ... 1420
- Pierre de Beaufort ... 1420–1444
- Anne de Beaufort ... 1444
  - Agne IV de La Tour ... 1445–1490, jure uxoris

House of La Tour

- François I de La Tour ... 1490–1494
- Antoine de La Tour ... 1494–1528
- François II de La Tour ... 1528–1532
- François III de La Tour ... 1532–1557
- Henri de La Tour ... 1557–1623

== Sources ==
- Abbott, Paul D. (1981). Provinces, Pays and Seigneuries of France. Pirie Printers. ISBN 0959377301.
- Bruel, Alexandre (1904). "Inventaire d'une partie des titres de famille et documents historiques de la maison de La Tour d'Auvergne". Annuaire-Bulletin de la Société de l'histoire de France. 41 (2): 193–241. JSTOR 23411866.
- Engel, Arthur; Serrure, Raymond (1894). Traité de numismatique du Moyen Âge. Vol. 2. Ernest Leroux.
- Leroux, Alfred (1898). Le Massif central: histoire d'une région de la France. Vol. 1. Librairie Émile Bouillon.
- Manetti, Roberta, ed. (2008). Flamenca: romanzo occitano del XIII secolo. Mucchi Editore.
- Maubourguet, Jean (1926). Le Périgord méridional des origines à l'an 1370: Étude d'histoire politique et religieuse. A. Coueslant.
- Pataki, Tibor (1987). "Les institutions seigneuriales de la vicomté de Turenne jusqu'en 1350". Bulletin de la Société des études littéraires, scientifiques et artistiques du Lot. 108 (4th fasc., 2nd part): 100–137.
- Settipani, Christian (2004). La Noblesse du Midi Carolingien: Études sur quelques grandes familles d'Aquitaine et du Languedoc, du IX^{e} au XI^{e} siècles. Toulousain, Périgord, Limousin, Poitou, Auvergne. Linacre College, Unit for Prosopographical Research.
- Stroński, Stanislaw (1914). La légende amoureuse de Bertran de Born. Champion.
- Velde, François R. (2009). "The Case of the Undying Debt". Federal Reserve Bank of Chicago, Chicago, IL.
