= Peire de Maensac =

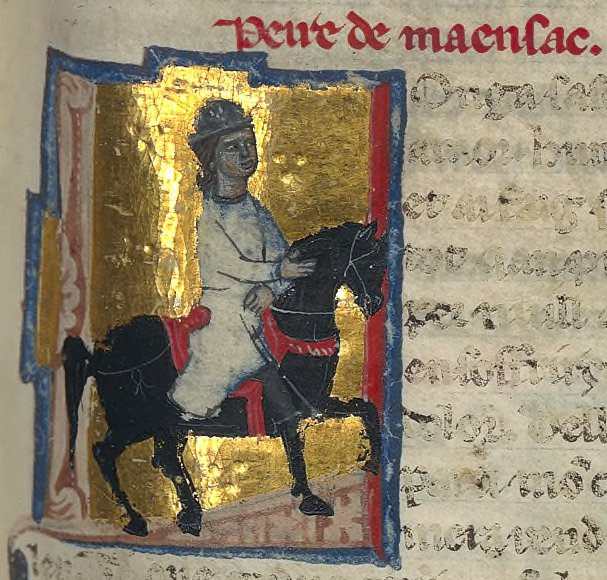
Peire de Maensac

Peire de Maensac was an Auvergnat knight and troubadour. He was from Maensac (either Mauzat, Manzat or Mainsat) in the lands of Dalfi d'Alvernha. He came from the petty nobility. His brother Austor or Austors was also a troubadour, but none of his works survives. According to Peire's vida the brothers agreed that one of them would "have the castle" (i.e. inherit) and the other would be the "inventor" (i.e. troubadour). Peire became the troubadour.

He wrote poems dedicated to the (unnamed) wife of Bernart de Tierci. According to his vida he sang so much to her that she eventually allowed herself to be "abducted" by him. He fled with her to the castle of Dalf d'Alvernha, but her husband waged a "great war" to bring her back. Dalfi reputedly defended the castle so well that Bernart was unable to ever reclaim her.

Peire was called a "pleasant companion" by his biographer. He wrote mostly cansos of courtly love with "pleasing melodies", but also coblas de solatz. The meaning of this last phrase is not certain. It could mean "good entertaining couplets" (bon couplets divertissants) according to Boutière-Schutz, the first of the vida's editors, but it could also mean simply tensos, as preferred by Egan, the vida's first English editor.

He was attacked by Robert of Auvergne in a sirventes.

== Sources ==
- The Vidas of the Troubadours. Margarita Egan, trans. New York: Garland, 1984. ISBN 0-8240-9437-9.
