= Giraut de Bornelh =

French troubadour (c. 1138 – 1215)

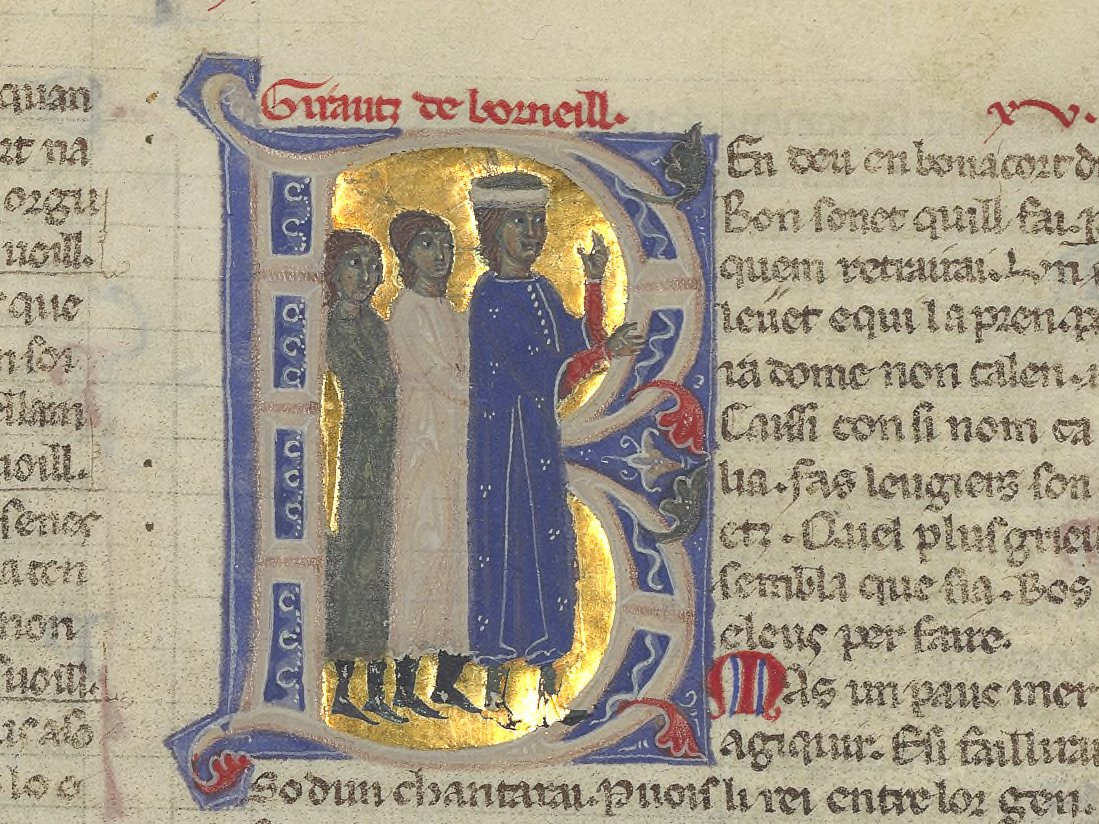
"Girautz de Borneill" (as written at top) in a 13th-century chansonnier.

Giraut de Bornelh (Occitan: [ɡiˈɾawd de βuɾˈneʎ]; c. 1138 – 1215), whose first name is also spelled Guiraut and whose toponym is de Borneil or de Borneyll, was a troubadour connected to the castle of the viscount of Limoges. He is credited with the formalisation, if not the invention, of the "light" style, or trobar leu.

Giraut was born to a lower-class family in the Limousin, probably in Bourney, near Excideuil in modern-day France.

Giraut's poems were first published in various collections, including Millot's Histoire litteraire des troubadours (Paris, 1774) and Raynouard's Choix des poésies originales des troubadours (Paris, 1816). Several of his poems were publosher in Alan R. Press' Anthology of Troubadour Lyric Poetry (1971). An English edition by Ruth V. Sharma has been published in 1989.

One of the most popular troubadours of his day, Giraut's reputation endured throughout the 13th century, when he was known as the Master of the Troubadours. Dante placed him in Paradise as a poeta rectitudinis, but implied that he thought Arnaut Daniel a better poet. Petrarch called him "master of the troubadours". Though rebarbative to modern taste when they adopt the high moral tone that recommended them to Dante, Giraut's songs are not devoid of lyricism or humour.

== Works ==
Giraut at his desk, from chansonnier M

Giraut de Bornelh was formally inventive and composed in a variety of genres: cansos, sirventes, pastorelas, and tensos. About ninety of his poems and four of his melodies survive; these were held in high esteem in the 13th century. Notable pieces include:

- S'anc jorn aqui joi e solaz, a planh about the death of Raimbaut d'Aurenga.
- Ara·m platz, Giraut de Borneill, a tenso with Raimbaut d'Aurenga discussing trobar clus versus trobar leu.
- Be me plairia, senh'en reis, a tenso with king Alfons II of Aragon Giraut contributes to the poetical debate as to whether a lady is dishonoured by taking a lover who is richer than herself. This debate was begun by Guilhem de Saint-Leidier, taken up by Azalais de Porcairagues and Raimbaut d'Aurenga, and continued in a partimen between Dalfi d'Alvernha and Perdigon.
- Reis glorios (glorious king), a well-known alba.

== Bibliography ==
- Sharman, Ruth V. (1989). The Cansos and Sirventes of the Troubadour Giraut de Borneil. Cambridge: Cambridge University Press. ISBN 0-521-25635-6.
- Gaunt, S. (1995). "Giraut de Bornelh". The New Oxford Companion to Literature in French. Oxford: Oxford University Press.
