= Peire d'Ussel =

Peire d'Ussel or d'Uisel (Pèire d'Ussèl in modern Occitan; fl. c. 1200) was a Limousin troubadour, the middle of three brothers, castellans of the castle of Ussel-sur-Sarzonne, northeast of Ventadorn. His elder brother was Eble and his younger Gui, and he also had a cousin named Elias; all four were troubadours.

According to Gui's vida, Peire descanted his relatives’ songs. This should not be understood to imply that Peire was only a musician. One cobla addressed to Gui exists under his name. The complete works of the four relations of Ussel, including Eble, were first compiled in one volume by J. Audiau as Les poésies des quatre troubadours d'Ussel (Paris, Delagrave, 1922). They are all available online at trobar.org.
