= Boso III =

Boso III may refer to:

- Boso III of Périgord (died 1031/1044), count of Périgord
- Boso III of La Marche (died 1091), count of La Marche
- Boso III of Turenne (fl. 1191–1197), viscount of Turenne
- Boso III of Challant (died 1239), viscount of Aosta

== See also ==
- Boso I
- Boso II
