= Raymond VIII of Turenne =

Viscount of Turenne

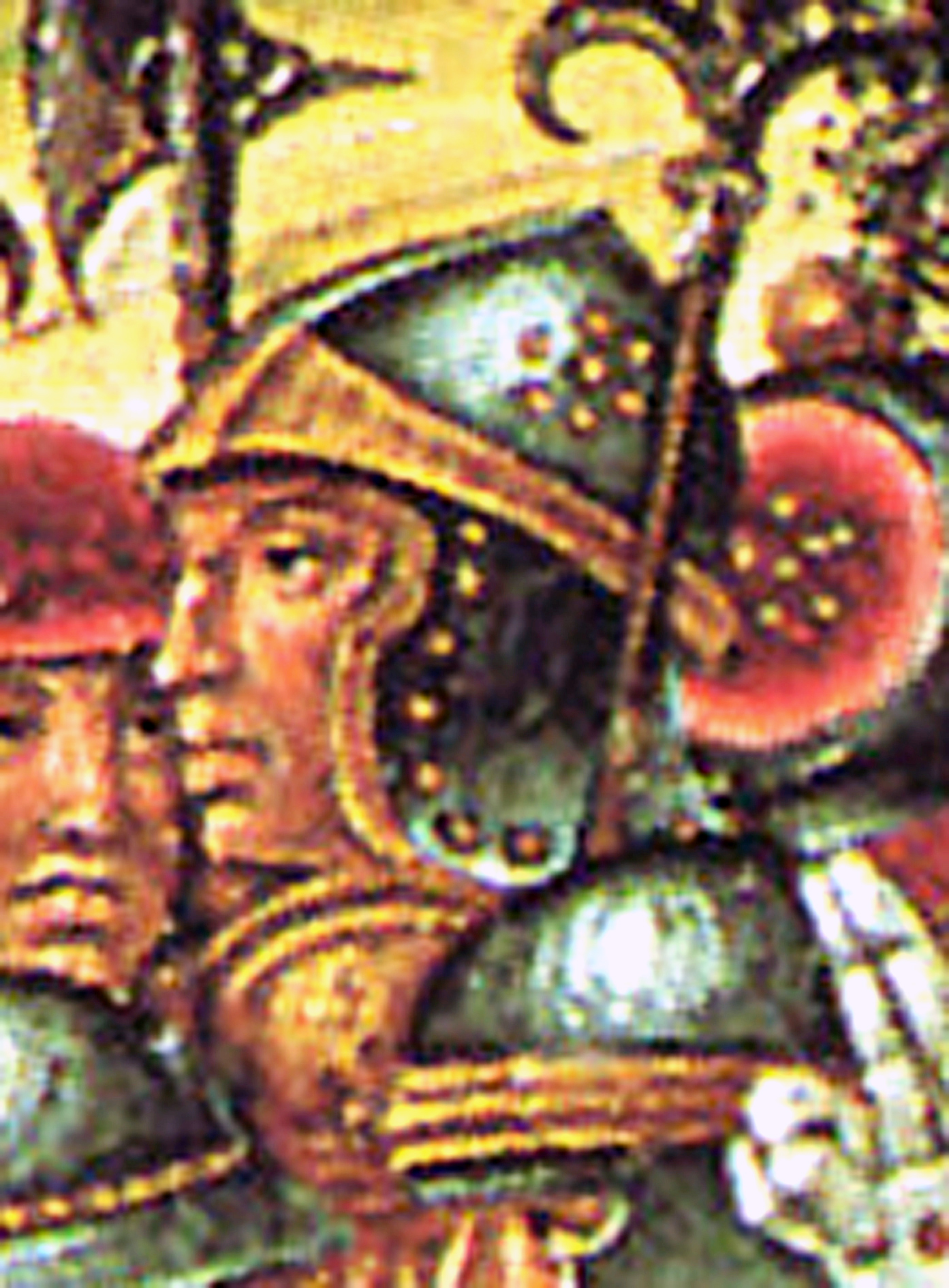
Raymond, detail from a fresco attributed to Girolamo di Benvenuto in Santa Maria della Scala, Siena

Raymond-Louis Roger de Beaufort (1352–c. 1413) was a French nobleman and military leader who was the viscount of Turenne (as Raymond VIII) from 1395. He belonged to the Roger de Beaufort family and was a grandnephew of Pope Clement VI and a nephew of Pope Gregory XI.

== Biography ==
Raymond served as a papal captain in the Comtat Venaissin and later in Italy, commanding troops in northern Italian campaigns. He accompanied Gregory XI on his return to Rome in 1376, an episode that preceded the outbreak of the Great Schism. During the schism, he opposed the Avignon Papacy and its principal political ally, the Angevin dynasty, after Duke Louis I of Anjou seized Pertuis, Raymond's principal seat.

The legal justification underlying his violent resistance was that Antipope Clement VII had defaulted on wages and loans owed to Raymond's family. From the late 1380s to the end of the century, Raymond waged a prolonged private war in Provence and neighboring regions against papal and comital authorities, notably Clement VII, Benedict XIII, and the regent Marie of Blois. Nonetheless, he supported Marie of Blois during the war against the Union of Aix.

Raymond rejected Angevin attempts to secure his allegiance through marriage and instead arranged the marriage of his only daughter, Antoinette, to Marshal Boucicaut, a leading figure of the French crown. This choice reflected his determination to preserve his autonomy and rank rather than submit to dynastic subordination.

The chronicler Bertrand Boysset accused Raymond of having "waged war on France for no reason, and [done] a lot of harm to the land". Because of the devastation caused by his campaigns, he became known as the "Scourge of Provence".

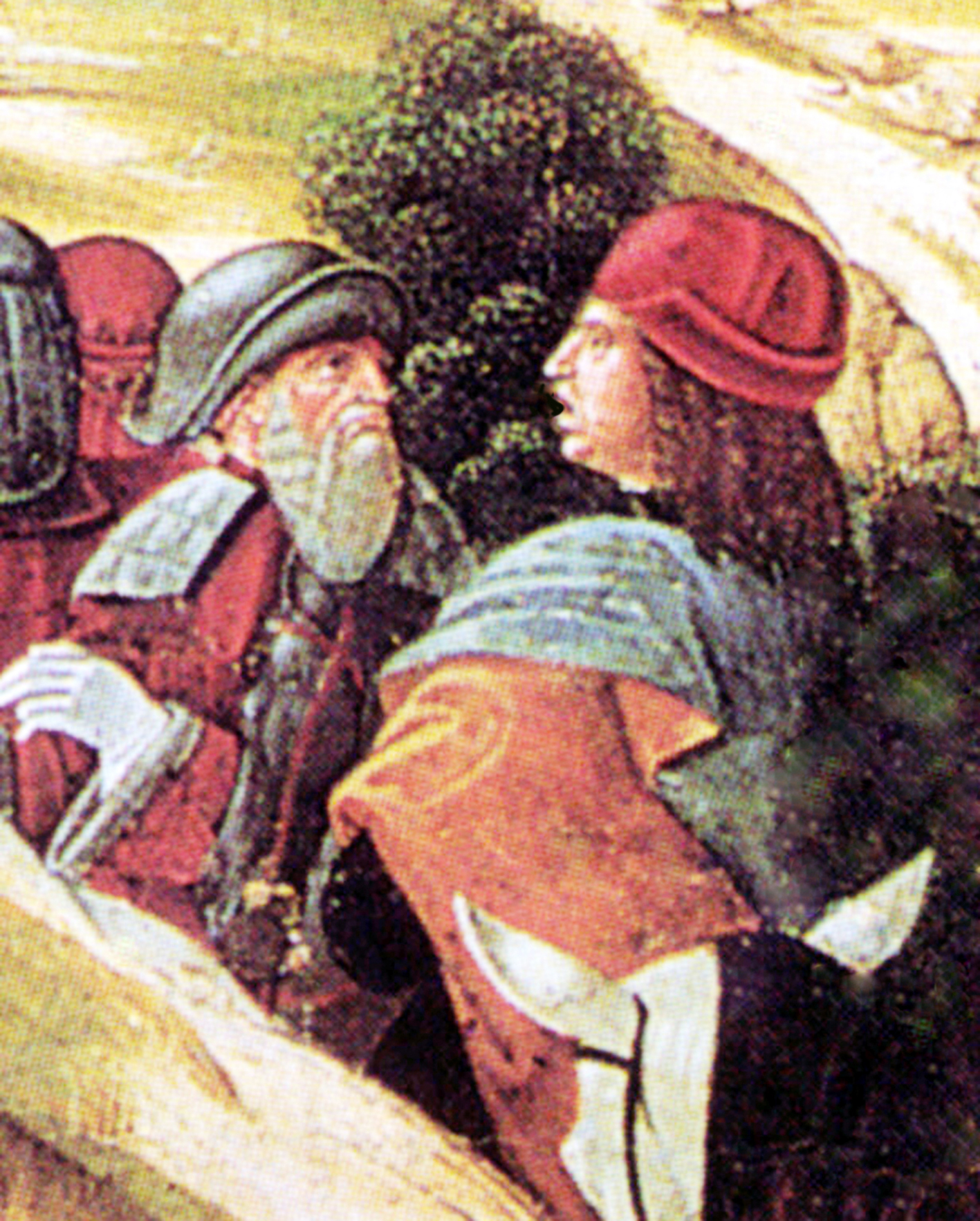
Juan Fernández de Heredia and Raymond VIII of Turenne during the return of Pope Gregory XI to Rome from Avignon

Raymond died around 1413, though the circumstances and place of his death remain unknown. His physical appearance was described by the Provençal historian César de Nostredame, whose account later enabled historians to identify Raymond in a late-14th-century fresco in Santa Maria della Scala, Siena, where he appears among papal forces facing Juan Fernández de Heredia. This identification makes Raymond one of the rare Provençal nobles of his generation to be plausibly recognized in contemporary art.

== Sources ==
- Bruel, Alexandre (1904). "Inventaire d'une partie des titres de famille et documents historiques de la maison de La Tour d'Auvergne". Annuaire-Bulletin de la Société de l'histoire de France. 41 (2): 193–241. JSTOR 23411866.
- Rollo-Koster, Joëlle (2022). The Great Western Schism, 1378–1417: Performing Legitimacy, Performing Unity. Cambridge University Press.
- Veydarier, Regis (1994). Raymond de Turenne, la deuxième maison d'Anjou et de Provence: Étude d'une rébellion nobiliaire à la fin du Moyen Âge (PhD dissertation). University of Montreal.
- César de Nostredame (1614). Histoire et chronique de Provence (in French). Lyon.
