= Renaud de Forez =

French archbishop (died 1226)

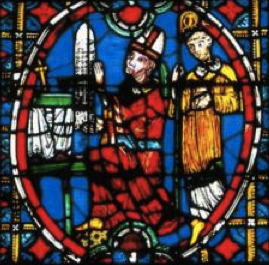
Renaud de Forez in stained glass in Lyon Cathedral

Renaud de Forez (died in Lyon October 22, 1226) was a French churchman who was Archbishop of Lyon as Renaud II (1193–1226). A son of Count Guigues II of Forez, Renaud acted as regent of the county of Forez for his nephew, Guigues IV, between 1203 and 1218. He joined the Lyon chapter during the episcopate of Guichard of Pontigny. He became abbot of Saint-Just in 1182.

== Biography ==
Born into a vassal feudal family of the King of France, with close military and financial support for the crown. During his episcopate, tensions with the citizens of Lyon were increasing, particularly over tax, and these tensions erupt into armed conflict in 1208 and was resolved through the mediation of Eudes III of Burgundy, which negotiated to restore the rights of the archbishop.

Scalded Renaud moved into Castlerock Scize and as Acting feudal lord, he began to build Lyon fortifications. Furthermore, in connection with a dispute between dynasty of (Forez) Drill and Beaujeu, he took possession of fiefs that they had in the Lyon.

In 1215, he established an annual celebration at Montbrison for the anniversary of the death of his brother Guigues III of Forez.

== Religious work ==
As Bishop, Renaud II continued the reconstruction of the Cathedral in the Gothic style, at great expense. In 1218, it hosts the Dominicans in Lyon, and in 1220, the Franciscans. Not neglecting his diocese, he established the first known parishes, and seems to be the origin of the first synodal statutes.

After writing his will October 16, 1226, he died in Lyon and is buried at St. Irenaeus Church in the burial chamber of the Counts of Forez.

== See also ==
- Catholic Church in France
