= Château de Ventadour =

Ruined castle in Nouvelle-Aquitaine, France

Coordinates: 45°23′32″N 2°7′0″E

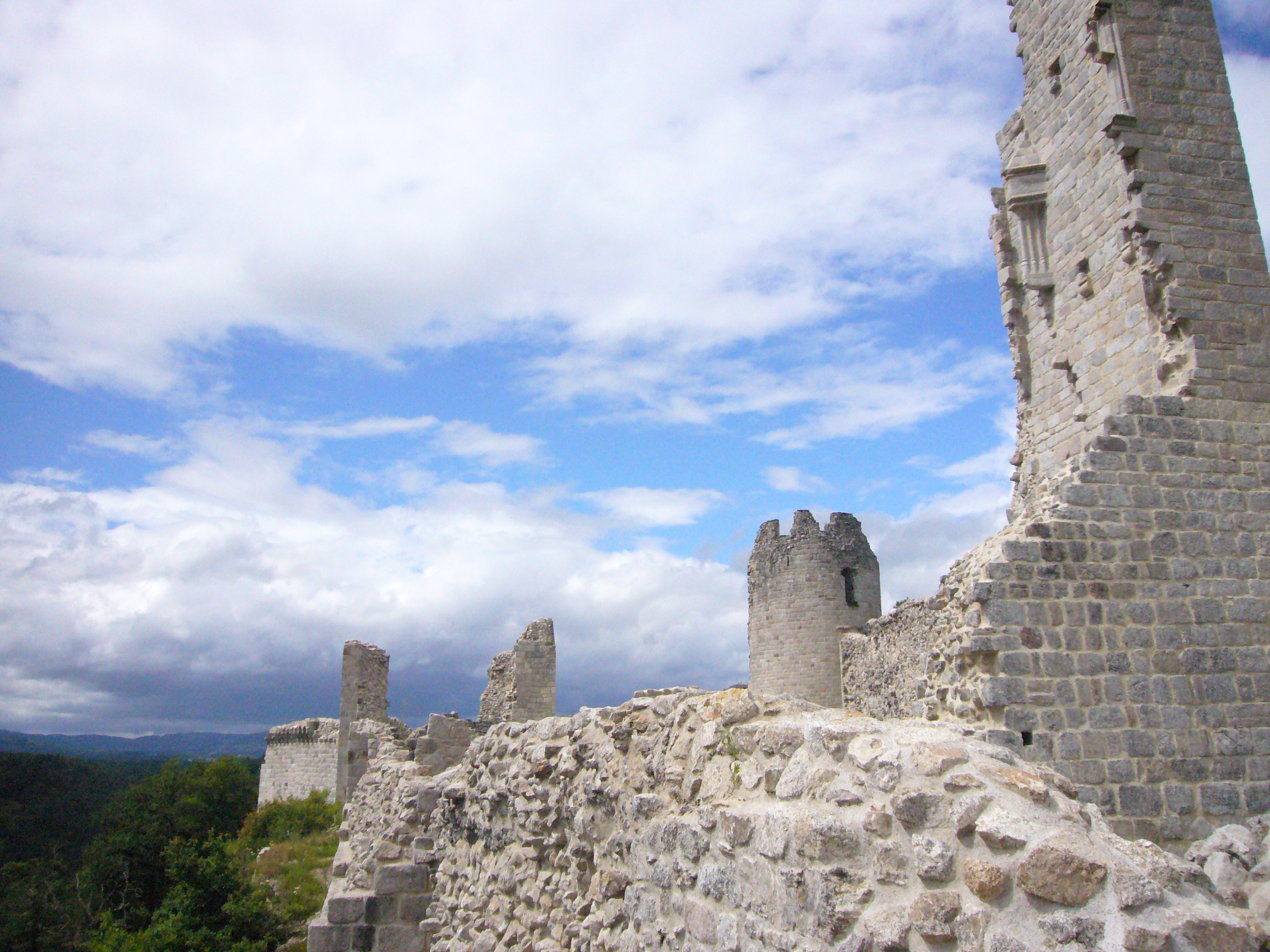
Ruins of the Château de Ventadour

The Château de Ventadour is in the commune of Moustier-Ventadour in the department of Corrèze (Limousin).

== Situation ==
Placed on a rocky outcrop overhanging the valley of Luzège, only few vestiges remain on the site of this feudal castle, which is still remarkably wild. The existing enclosure follows the contour of the plateau thus protecting a place of 170 m length and 30 m wide at its maximum. One finds inside some traces of a chapel and a residence, an important round tower and a section of wall seeming to be that of a square keep. (Though most impressive when glimpsed from the D991, access is advised from the Égletons direction. Access is possible from the D991 but is a steep, single track with tight hair-pin bends).

== History ==
The castle was built in the eleventh century, and probably altered during several periods of construction and rebuilding extending from the twelfth to the fifteenth century. It controlled the viscounty of Ventadour, whose political centers were Égletons and Ussel. Ventadour became a county in 1350 under Philippe de Valois, and a Duchy-Peerage in 1578. It was held by the noble family of Ventadour until 1472, when the last heiress married Louis de Lévis, Baron de la Voulte. Later the stronghold passed by marriage to Rohans, and from the Rohan-Soubises-Ventadour line to the Prince of Condé, who allowed it to fall into disrepair. Sold as a national asset, the castle gradually was dismantled, especially after the Bourbon Restoration, when it was acquired by the merchant and materials dealer Pertuis du Gay. It was then the property of the duke of Lévis-Mirepoix.

== Restoration ==
The site was classified as an historic site in 1946, but required major renovations due to the extensive damage it had suffered in previous centuries. In 1965, consolidation work and excavations were undertaken to try to restore the former splendor of the fortress. By 1980, it became possible to identify the original location of a certain number of rooms within the enclosure, and several important decorative features of the lordly residence were recovered. Further excavations took place in 2003 (the north-eastern curtain wall) and 2004-2005 (the barbican and tower); nevertheless, the site is now open to the public (for a modest fee). In the summer of 2017 guided tours (in French) were offered.

== Chronology ==
- 1059: One of the sons of the Viscount of Archambaud II of Comborn received the prerogative of Ventadour and decided to establish a fortress there. Construction continued until 1060 with the simultaneous establishment of several châtellenies like Lieuteret, Fontmartin, and in several cities like Égletons, Neuvic, Corrèze, Meymac and Ussel.
- 1060: Ebles I founded the priory of Moustier-Ventadour then those of Meymac and Bonnesaigne.
- 1096: Ebles I died and his son Ebles II was interested in courteous art of Languedoc and became friend with Guillaume IX of Aquitaine, one of the most famous troubadours of the time. Ebles has founded a poetic school with Ventadour.
- 1125: birth of Bernard, son of a servant who became a famous troubadour
- 1182: Henry II of England established a siege of Ventadour. After a few months, the fortress not succumbing, the siege was raised.
- 1198: Richard the Lionheart once again attempted a siege, after which he went to Châlus where he was killed.
- 1250-1350: The fortress is deeply altered with higher and thicker ramparts and also more decorated and more comfortable apartments.
- 1379: During the Hundred Years' War, the castle was invested by the robber Geoffroy and a band of plundering rovers who, starting from the fortified place, ransomed and plundered all the area during nearly 10 years.
- 1450: a new residence was built in the walls of the castle by Charles de Ventadour.
- 1450-1500: Charles and his Louis son organized a military academy in Ventadour for the formation of pages for the service of the King.
- 1575: Gilbert III of Ventadour became governor of the Limousin; important religious confrontations ruined his territory. The abbey of Bonnesaigne was burned but Ventadour remained intact.
- 1578: Henri III raised the county of Ventadour to a duchy. It became the first Duchy of the Bas-Limousin
- 1599: The wars of religion were sources of destruction and plunderings of fortified towns in the Limousin but Ventadour, citadel of the governors, has resisted.
- 1631: Charles, new Duke of Ventadour was admitted among the close relations of Louis XIII. He was at the same time Lieutenant Général of Languedoc and Gouverneur of the Limousin.
- 1649: Charles’ son, Louis-Charles became Duc and Pair of France. He lived in Paris and it was the beginning of the decline of the castle.
- 1793: The Comité de salut public of Égletons and the Conventional of Tulle ordered the destruction of Ventadour. The castle was plundered and the roofs were destroyed.
- 1796: On July 11, Ventadour is sold to a farrier of Égletons.
- 1800: The castle is resold to a demolition contractor who sold materials and who undertook to take off the stones.
- 1804: An access path and an opening in the enclosing wall were carried out to facilitate the transport of materials of demolition.
- 1829: The vestiges of Ventadour were purchased by Madam d' Ambert de Lamazière to organize pastoral afternoons in the “romantic ruins”.
- 1895: The site was transferred to the Lévis-Mirepoix, cousins of the Lévis-Ventadour.
- 1900: A feast celebrates Bernard, the troubadour.
- 1930-1939: Feasts were organized annually in the site by the mayor of Moustier-Ventadour.
- 1940-1945: Used as an observation post by the resistance. Site of a brief engagement with a Nazi column retreating on the D991 where a roadside memorial can be found.
- 1965: Beginning of the excavations and of the emergency works of consolidation.

== See also ==
- List of castles in France
