= Robert IV of Auvergne =

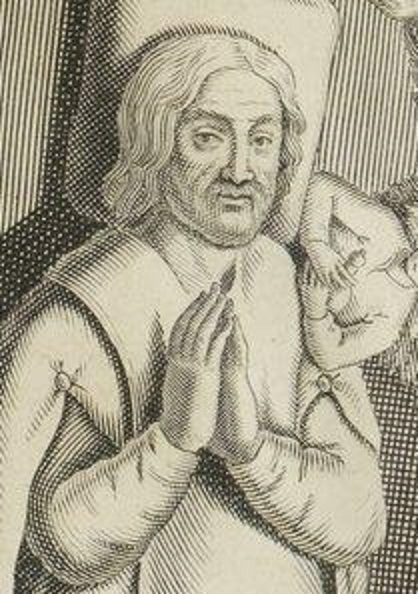
- Detail of the recumbent figure of the tomb of Robert IV, Count of Auvergne, in the abbey of Bouschet-Vauluisant, Yronde-et-Buron.

Count of Auvergne
- Reign: 1182-1194
- Predecessor: William VIII of Auvergne
- Successor: William IX of Auvergne
- Died: 1194
- Spouse: Mahaut of Burgundy
- Issue: William IX of Auvergne; Guy II of Auvergne; Robert of Auvergne; Robert 'of Clermont'; Marie
- House: House of Auvergne
- Father: William VIII of Auvergne
- Mother: Anne of Nevers

Robert IV of Auvergne (died 1194) was count of Auvergne from 1182 until his death.

== Life ==
Robert was the first-born son of William VIII, the count of Auvergne, and Anne of Nevers. In 1182, William VIII died and Robert inherited the county of Auvergne.In 1183, he repelled an assault by the Brabançons merecenaries working for Geoffrey II, Duke of Brittany.

Robert founded the Abbey of Bouschet in 1191. He died in 1194 and was interred there.

== Family and issue ==
He married Mahaut (Matilda) of Burgundy, daughter of Odo II, Duke of Burgundy and Marie of Blois, Duchess of Burgundy. They had six children:

- William IX of Auvergne, count of Auvergne.
- Guy II of Auvergne, count of Auvergne.
- Robert of Auvergne, bishop of Clermont and Archbishop of Lyon
- Robert "of Clermont", addressed as lord of Oliergues in 1208 and is also cited in 1210 by the son of his sister Marie.
- Marie, that married Albert II, lord of La Tour-du-Pin.
- An unnamed daughter (died 1210), who married Guy V, Viscount of Limoges.

French nobility
Preceded by William VIII	Count of Auvergne; 1182–1194	Succeeded by William IX
