= Dalfi d'Alvernha =

French count in the 12th century

- Count of Clermont and Montferrand
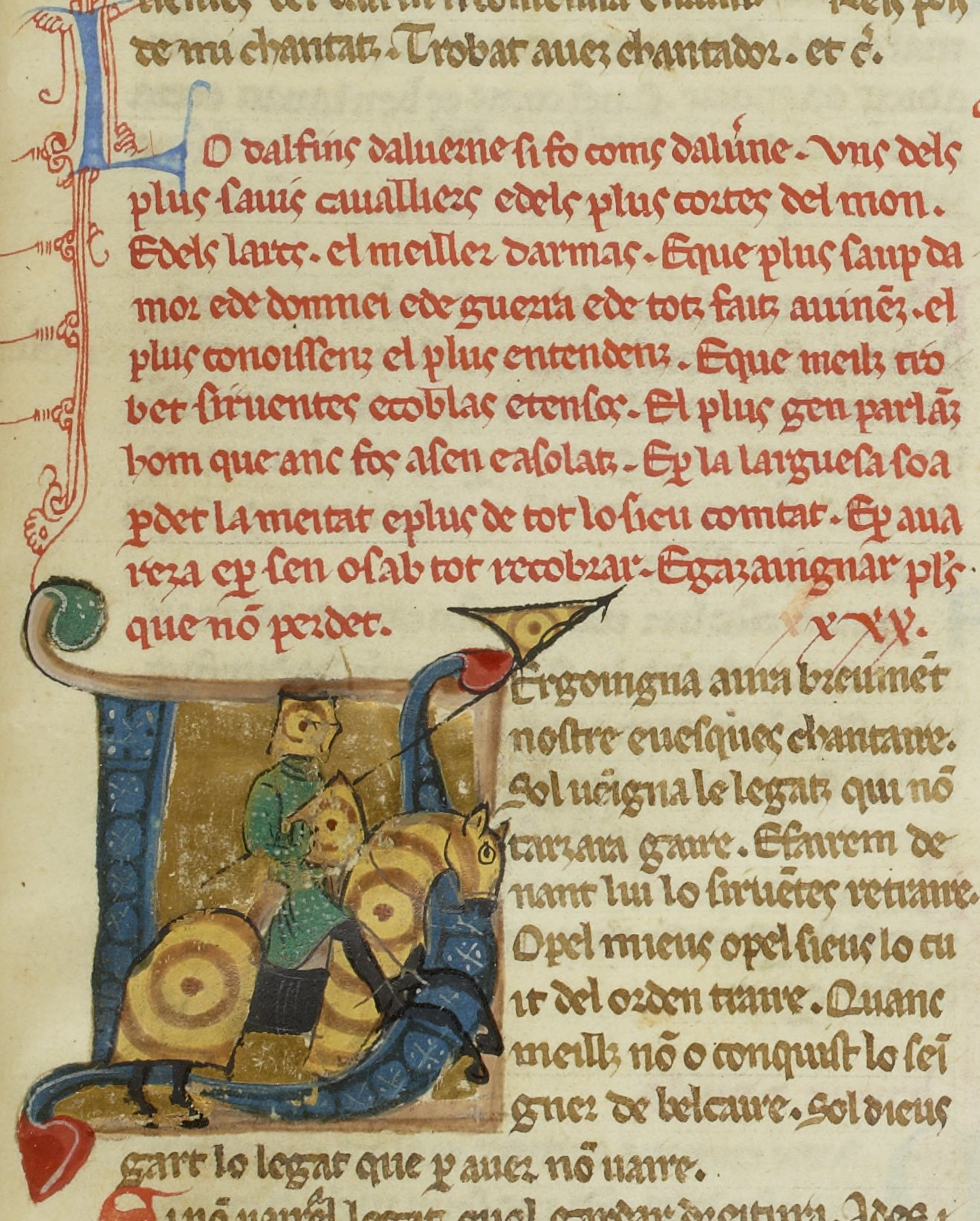
- Lo dalfins dalverne si fo coms dalverne, uns dels plus savis cavalliers e dels plus cortes del mon... "The Dauphin of Auvergne was the Count of Auvergne, one of the wisest and most courtly knights of the world…"
- Born: c. 1150
- Died: 1234 or 1235
- Spouse: Guillemette de Comborn
- Father: William VII the Young of Auvergne
- Mother: Jeanne de Calabre
- Occupation: Troubadour

Dalfi d'Alvernha (French: Dauphin d'Auvergne) was the Count of Clermont and Montferrand, a troubadour and a patron of troubadours. He was born around 1150 and died in 1234 or 1235. He is sometimes called Robert IV, but there is no solid evidence for the name Robert, and the name can cause confusion, since his first cousin once removed was Robert IV, Count of Auvergne, who died in 1194.

Dalfi d'Alvernha was the son of William VII the Young of Auvergne, Count of Clermont, and of Jeanne de Calabre. He married Guillemette de Comborn, Countess of Montferrand, daughter of Archambaud, Viscount of Comborn, and Jourdaine of Périgord. Their children were Aélis, Guillaume (William, later Count of Clermont), Blanche, and Alix.

Troubadours who worked with Dalfi or sang at his court include Peirol, Perdigon, Peire de Maensac, Gaucelm Faidit, and Uc de Saint Circ; his cousin, bishop Robert of Clermont, exchanged satirical and erotic verses with him, as did Richard Coeur de Lion. One partimen between Dauphin and Perdigon marks a stage in the poetical debate, begun by Guilhem de Saint-Leidier and taken up by Azalais de Porcairagues and Raimbaut of Orange, as to whether a lady is dishonoured by taking a lover who is richer than herself. A tensó on the same subject was composed by Guiraut de Bornelh and king Alfonso II of Aragon.

== Bibliography ==
- Biographies des troubadours ed. J. Boutière, A.-H. Schutz (Paris: Nizet, 1964) pp. 284–298.

French nobility
Preceded by William VII	Dauphin of Auvergne; 1169–1235	Succeeded by William VIII
