= Raymond II of Turenne =

Viscount of Turenne

Raymond II (c. 1143 – 1190 at Acre) was the 9th Viscount of Turenne from the House of Comborn. He was a son of Viscount Boson II and Eustorgie d'Anduze, and grandson of Raymond I of Turenne.

Raymond was born posthumously four months after his father's death. Together with his cousin Aimar V of Limoges, he took part in several revolts against Duke Richard I. He joined the Third Crusade, in which he died during the Siege of Acre in 1190.

Raymond was married to Helie, a daughter of Bernard of Castelnau. She later became a nun at Obazine Abbey. Their children were:

- Raymond III (died 1219), Viscount of Turenne
- Boso
- Contors, married Elijah of Comborn
- Marie, married Viscount Eble V of Ventadorn (died around 1236)
- Helie, married Bernard of Casnac

The troubadour Bertran de Born sang about his three daughters.
