= Raymond IV of Turenne =

Viscount of Turenne

Raymond IV (c. 1187 – c. 1243) was the 11th Viscount of Turenne from the House of Comborn. He was a son of Viscount Raymond III and Helie of Severac.

Raymond declared his willingness to participate in a crusade (Fifth Crusade) in a document issued in 1219 in Martel. He was married to Alix, a daughter of Count Guy II of Auvergne. They had a daughter together named Hélis, who was married to Elias Rudel of Bergerac. His daughter's inheritance was successfully contested by Raymond's nephew, Raymond V, at the latest after the death of her mother around 1250.
