= Bernart de Ventadorn =

French troubadour (c. 1130–40 – c 1190–1200)

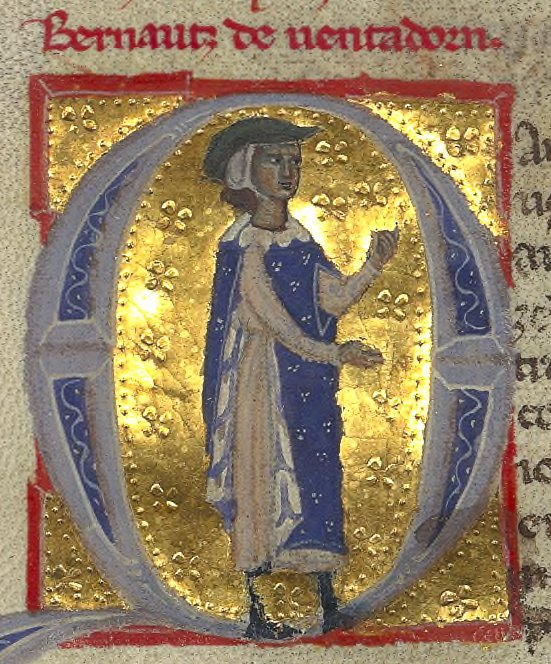
Depiction of Bernart from fol. 15v of the Chansonnier BnF ms. 12473

Bernart de Ventadorn (also Bernard de Ventadour or Bernat del Ventadorn; c. 1130–1140 – c. 1190–1200) was an Occitan poet-composer troubadour of the classical age of troubadour poetry. Generally regarded as the most important troubadour in both poetry and music, his 18 extant melodies of 45 known poems in total is the most to survive from any 12th-century troubadour. He is remembered for his mastery as well as popularization of the trobar leu style, and for his prolific cançons, which helped define the genre and establish the "classical" form of courtly love poetry, to be imitated and reproduced throughout the remaining century and a half of troubadour activity.

Now thought of as "the Master Singer," he developed the cançons into a more formalized style which allowed for sudden turns. Bernart was known for being able to portray his women as divine agents in one moment and then, in a sudden twist, as Eve – the cause of man's initial sin. This dichotomy in his work is portrayed in a "graceful, witty, and polished" medium.

== Life and career ==
According to the troubadour Uc de Saint Circ, Bernart was possibly the son of a baker at the castle of Ventadour (Ventadorn), in today's Corrèze (France). Yet another source, a satirical poem written by a younger contemporary, Peire d'Alvernha, indicates that he was the son of either a servant, a soldier, or a baker, and his mother was also either a servant or a baker. From evidence given in Bernart's early poem Lo temps vai e ven e vire, he most likely learned the art of singing and writing from his protector, viscount Eble III of Ventadorn. He composed his first poems to his patron's wife, Marguerite de Turenne.

Forced to leave Ventadour after falling in love with Margerite, he traveled to Montluçon and Toulouse, and eventually followed Eleanor of Aquitaine to England and the Plantagenet court; evidence for this association and these travels comes mainly from his poems themselves. Later Bernart returned to Toulouse, where he was employed by Raimon V, Count of Toulouse; later still he went to Dordogne, where he entered a monastery. Most likely he died there.

== Works ==
Bernart is unique among secular composers of the twelfth century in the amount of music which has survived: of his forty-five poems, eighteen have music intact, an unusual circumstance for a troubadour composer (music of the trouvères has a higher survival rate, usually attributed to them surviving the Albigensian Crusade, which scattered the troubadours and destroyed many sources). His work probably dates between 1147 and 1180. Bernart is often credited with being the most important influence on the development of the trouvère tradition in northern France, since he was well known there, his melodies were widely circulated, and the early composers of trouvère music seem to have imitated him. Bernart's influence also extended to Latin literature. In 1215 the Bolognese professor Boncompagno wrote in his Antiqua rhetorica that "How much fame attaches to the name of Bernard de Ventadorn, and how gloriously he made cansos and sweetly invented melodies, the world of Provence very much recognises."

== Cultural references ==
On screen, Bernart was portrayed by actor Paul Blake in the BBC TV drama series The Devil's Crown (1978).

In the final fragment (Canto CXX) of his epic poem The Cantos, American expatriate poet Ezra Pound, who had a lifelong fascination with the trouveres and troubadours of Provence and southern France, quotes from Bernart's Can vei la lauzeta mover twice.
