= Raymond III of Turenne =

Viscount of Turenne

Raymond III (c. 1165 – 1219) was the 10th Viscount of Turenne of the House of Comborn. He was a son of Viscount Raymond II and Helie of Castelnau.

Raymond participated in the first military engagement of the Albigensian Crusade. Together with Count Guy II of Auvergne, the Archbishop of Bordeaux and the Bishops of Limoges, Cahors and Agen, he led a Crusader army into the Quercy region in May 1209. After taking three smaller towns, their advance stopped in front of the castle of Casseneuil. However, they terminated the coalition after forty days and withdrew to their lands.

Raymond died due to a head injury. He was married to Helie, the heiress of Guy of Severac. Their children were:

- Boson III (died 1209), co-regent in Turenne
- Raymond IV (died c. 1243), Viscount of Turenne
- Raymond, lord of Servières and Malemort; father of Raymond V
