= Limousin (province) =

Province of the former Kingdom of France (1589–1790)

Limousin Occitan: Lemosin
- Province of Kingdom of France
- 1589–1790
- Coat of arms

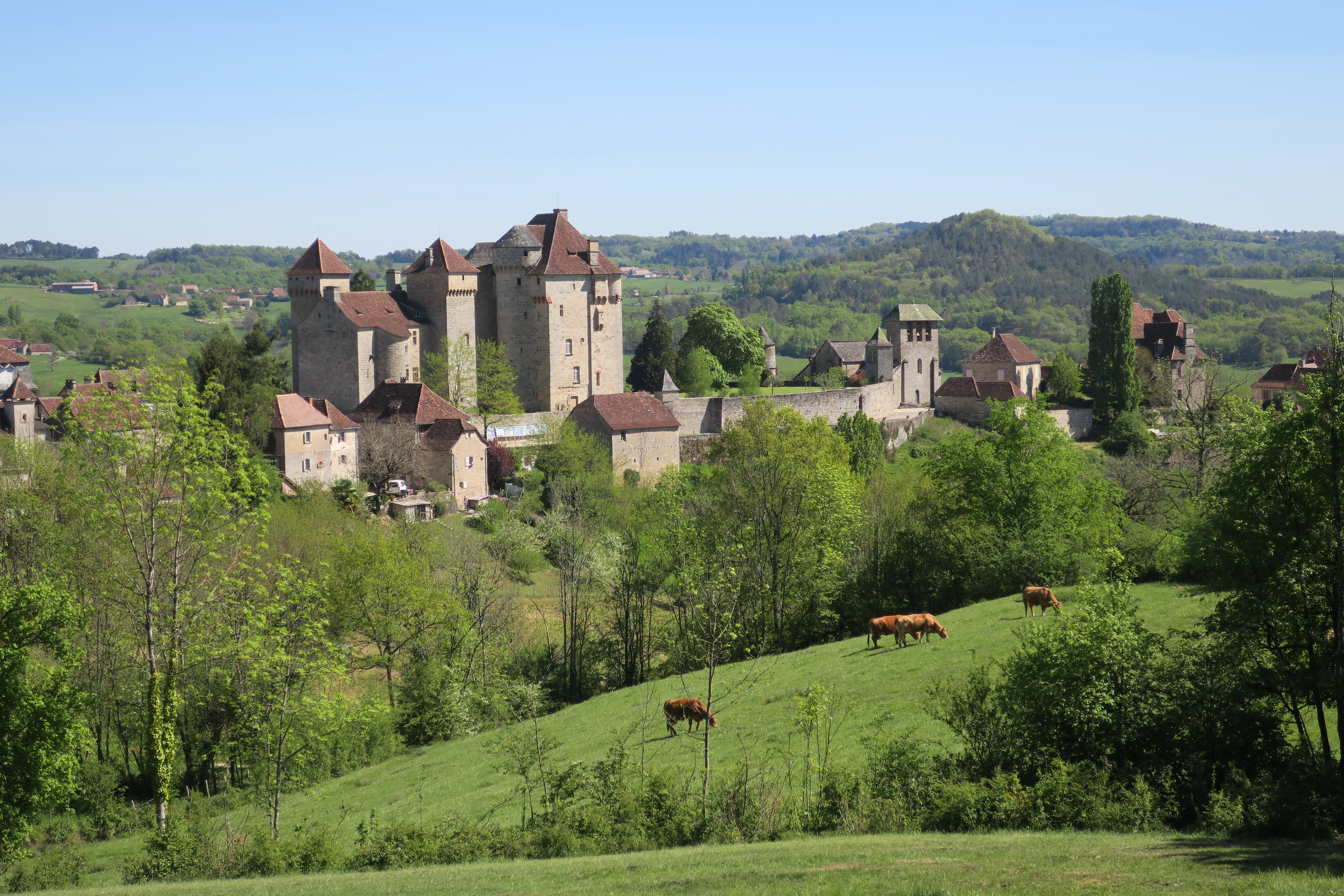
- The Château des Plas, in Curemonte

- History
  - Established: 1589
  - Disestablished: 1790
Preceded by
Viscounty of Limoges
Succeeded by
Corrèze
Haute-Vienne
Dordogne

Limousin (French pronunciation: [limuzɛ̃]; Occitan: Lemosin [lemuˈzi]) is a former province of the Kingdom of France. It existed from 1589 until 1790, when the National Constituent Assembly adopted a more uniform division into departments (départements) and districts (arrondissements). It is located in the foothills of the western edge of the Massif Central and surrounds the city of Limoges (Occitan: Limòtges).

The territory of the former province of Limousin corresponds to an area smaller than the administrative region, comprising the current department of Corrèze, the southern half of Haute-Vienne (including Limoges, its historic capital), and a small part of the Dordogne.

== History ==
The history of Limousin reaches back to Celtic and Roman times (50 BC to 550 AD). Its name is derived from the name of a Gallic tribe, the Lemovices, whose main sanctuary was recently found in Tintignac and became a major research site of the Celtic world.

During the 10th century, Limousin was divided into many seigneuries. The most important of them, located in the southern part of the region, were the vicomtés of Limoges, Comborn (in present-day Corrèze), Ventadour (today Ussel and Plateau de Millevaches), and Turenne. The northernmost part of Limousin belonged to the County of La Marche, while the bishops of Limoges controlled most of present-day Haute-Vienne. Such political fragmentation led to the construction of many castles, whose ruins still evoke memories of that historical period.

The territory was attached to the kingdom of France in 1589, with the accession to the throne of Henry IV of France. The province of Limousin disappeared during the French Revolution. It was dismantled and divided between three new departments established by the National Constituent Assembly: mostly Corrèze and Haute-Vienne, and to a lesser extent the Dordogne.

The region was reconstituted in 1960 as an Limousin (administrative region) until 2015, when it was merged into the Nouvelle-Aquitaine region.

Map of the former province of Limousin, France, showing the communes according to the current administrative division.

== See also ==
- Limousin (former administrative region)
- Provinces of France

== Bibliography ==
- Bernard-Allée, Philippe; André, Marie-Françoise; Pallier, Ginette (1994). L'Atlas du Limousin. Limoges: Pulim
- Bonneton, Christine ed. (2000). "Limousin". Encyclopédie Bonneton. Paris: Bonneton
- Bourdelas, Laurent (2001). Plaidoyer pour un limogeage. Limoges: Lucien Souny
- Capot, Stéphane; Valade, Jean-Michel (2008). Limousin 14–18, un abécédaire de la Grande guerre. Limoges: Les ardents éditeurs
