= Tenso =

Style of troubadour song

A tenso (Old Occitan: [tenˈsu, teⁿˈsu]; French: tençon) is a style of troubadour song. It takes the form of a debate in which each voice defends a position; common topics relate to love or ethics. Usually, the tenso is written by two different poets, but several examples exist in which one of the parties is imaginary, including God (Peire de Vic), the poet's horse (Bertran Carbonel) or his cloak (Gui de Cavalhon). Closely related, and sometimes overlapping, genres include:

- the partimen, in which more than two voices discuss a subject
- the cobla esparsa or cobla exchange, a tenso of two stanzas only
- the contenson, where the matter is eventually judged by a third party.

== Notable examples ==
- Marcabru and Uc Catola: Amics Marchabrun, car digam, possibly the earliest known example.
- Cercamon and Guilhalmi: Car vei finir a tot dia, another candidate for the earliest known example.
- Raimbaut d'Aurenga and Giraut de Bornelh: Ara·m platz, Giraut de Borneill, where major exponents of the two styles extol trobar clus and trobar leu, respectively.
- Raimbaut de Vaqueiras: Domna tan vos ai preiada, where an (imaginary) Genoese lady answers the poet in her own dialect, is the only early document written in it.
- Peire de Vic: L’autrier fui en paradis, a contrast with God
- Montan: Eu veing vas vos, Seingner, fauda levada, considered the most obscene of Old Occitan lyrics.
- Carenza and Iselda: Na Carenza al bel cors avenens, about whether a lady should get married, between two trobairitz.

== Legacy ==
In Italian literature, the tenso was adapted as the tenzone. In Old French, it became the tençon.

In the Galician-Portuguese lyric, it was called tençom.
