= Moustier-Ventadour =

- Commune
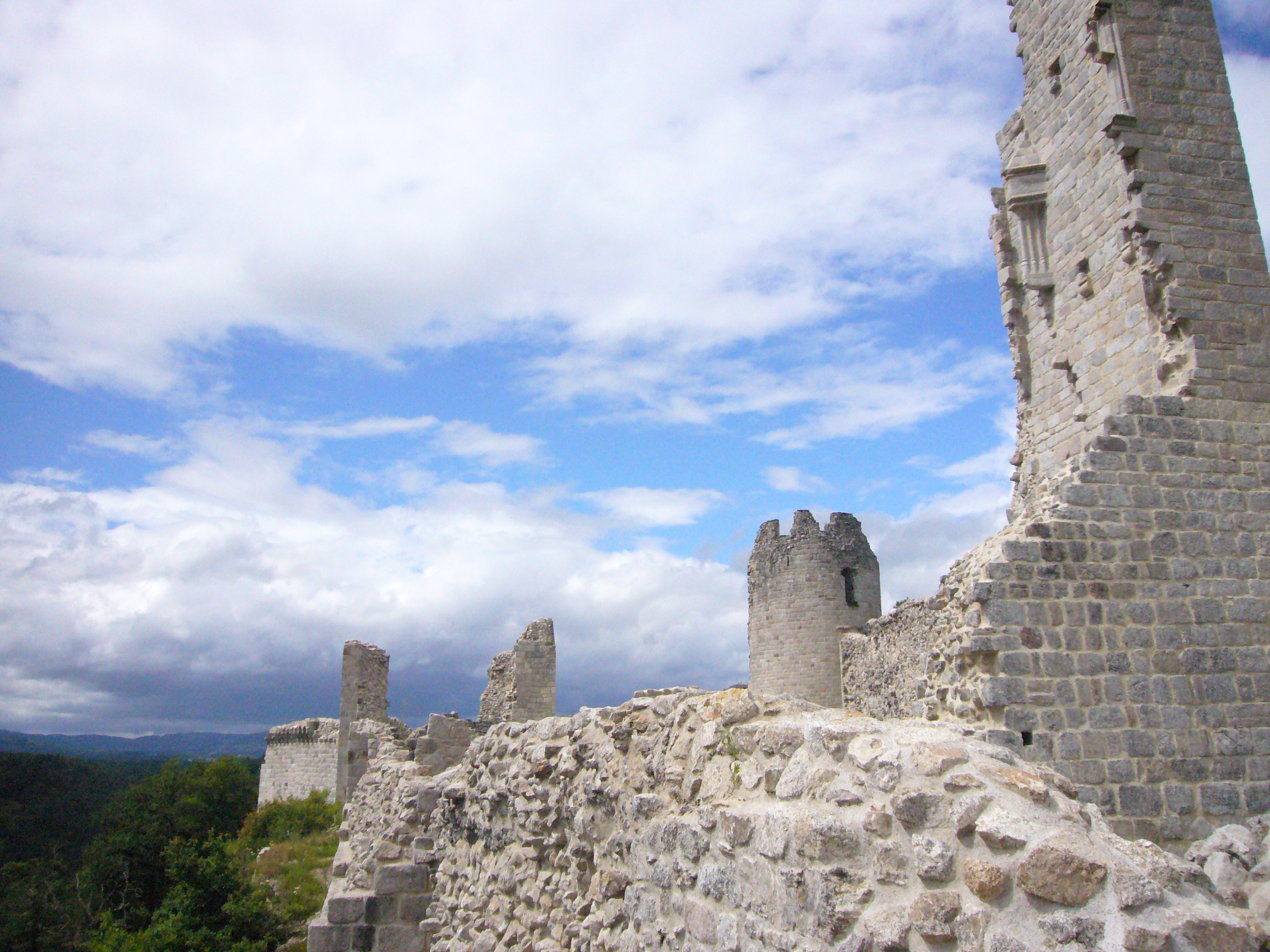
- The Château de Ventadour

- Coat of arms
- Location of Moustier-Ventadour
- Location within France Location within Nouvelle-Aquitaine
- Coordinates: 45°23′46″N 2°06′18″E
- Country: France
- Region: Nouvelle-Aquitaine
- Department: Corrèze
- Arrondissement: Ussel
- Canton: Égletons

Government
  - Mayor (2020–2026): Christophe Petit
- Area^{1}: 29.85 km^{2} (11.53 sq mi)
- Elevation: 590 m (1,940 ft)
- Highest elevation: 689 m (2,260 ft)
- Lowest elevation: 390 m (1,280 ft)
- Population (2023): 405
  - Density: 13.6/km^{2} (35.1/sq mi)
- Time zone: UTC+01:00 (CET)
  - Summer (DST): UTC+02:00 (CEST)
- INSEE/Postal code: 19145 /19300
- ^{1} French Land Register data, which excludes lakes, ponds, glaciers > 1 km^{2} (0.386 sq mi or 247 acres) and river estuaries.

Moustier-Ventadour (French pronunciation: [mustje vɑ̃taduʁ]; Occitan: Mostier de Ventadorn) is a commune in the Corrèze department in central France.

== Geography ==
The Luzège forms most of the commune's eastern boundary.

== Population ==
Historical population
Year	Pop.	±% p.a.
1968	355	—
1975	316	−1.65%
1982	302	−0.65%
1990	383	+3.01%
1999	416	+0.92%
2007	455	+1.13%
2012	496	+1.74%
2017	451	−1.88%
2023	405	−1.78%
Source: INSEE

== Personalities ==
- Bernart de Ventadorn, medieval troubadour

== See also ==
- Château de Ventadour
- Communes of the Corrèze department
