= Jaufre (disambiguation) =

Jaufre is a medieval Arthurian romance in the Occitan language.

Jaufre may also refer to:

- Jaufre Rudel (12th century), Occitan nobleman and troubadour
- Jaufre de Pons (13th century), Occitan knight and troubadour
- Jaufre Reforzat de Trets (13th century), Occitan nobleman and troubadour
