= Isnart d'Entrevenas =

Provençal troubadour

Isnart or Iznart d'Entrevenas or d'Antravenas (fl. 1203–1225) was a Provençal troubadour, the son of Raimon d'Agout, a patron of troubadours, and husband of Beatrice, daughter of Jaufre Reforzat de Trets.

Isnart held land in Agoult, Pontevès, and Entrevennes, from which he took his name. His poetry implies a sojourn in Lombardy. In Provence he figures in various documents between 1203 and 1225 and was the podestà of Arles in 1220. On 22 November 1251 an Isnart d'Entrevenas witnessed the peace treaty between Barral of Baux and Charles of Anjou, but it was probably not the troubadour but his son.

Isnart's work is preserved in two chansonniers, named D (the Poetarum Provinciali) and N (the Philipps Manuscript). He wrote two coblas (in series) attacking Blacatz, sometimes classed as a sirventes. The second cobla goes:

| Si plagues a.n Blacatz, pos novels es lo sos, mais valgra sa chanzos s'i meses puois e praz, horz e vergers foillaz, Espaign'et Almaria e Franz'e Lombardia e los bous (bautzes or bauç) Bertelai (Bertalai) e los loncs iornz de mai e.l dotze mes de l'an e l'herba Saint Iohan e la pasqa floria. |

"Bertelai" is a reference to the Bertolai of Arthurian legend, who appears in Lancelot du Lac. Isnart probably took the idea from a poem of Giraut de Bornelh. He also composed a partimen, "Del sonet", with the jongleur Pelestort sometime before 1237.

== Sources ==
- Jeanroy, Alfred (1934). La poésie lyrique des troubadours. Toulouse: Privat.
