= Agoult =

Agoult is a surname. Notable people with the surname include:

- Charles Constance César Joseph Matthieu d'Agoult (1747–1824), French bishop
- Reforce d'Agoult, Angevin seneschal of medieval Lombardy
- Marie d'Agoult (1805–1876), Franco-German romantic author and historian
- Raymond Agoult (1911–1992), English conductor
