= Elias de Barjols =

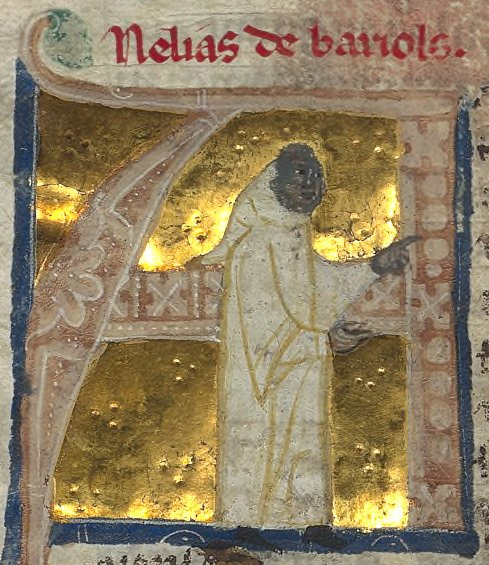
N'Elias de Bariols (red text) portrayed as a frater pontifex one of the bridge-building brothers

Elias de Barjols (fl. 1191–1230) was a bourgeois Aquitainian troubadour who established himself in Provence and retired a monk. Eleven of his lyrics survive, but none of his music.

According to his vida Elias was the son of a merchant and came from Agenais. The name of his birthplace is peiols in the manuscripts, but such a name can not be found in Agenais nor elsewhere: the most recent edition suggests that peiols is a scribal error for Poiols, ancient name of Pujols, castle placed in Agenais, about 25 km from Agen. The identification of peiols as Pérols-sur-Vézère, as Stronski proposed in 1906, is untenable, because this place was not a castle and was not in Agenais, but in Limousin. According to his vida he was the greatest singer of his age (but such a statement is very frequent in the vidas') and he travelled widely from court to court as a jongleur with a fellow jongleur named Oliver. They eventually found favour with Alfonso II of Provence: a document dated to 1208 seems to confirm this. Alfonso gave them wives and land in Barjols, where Elias is witness in a document of Ramon Berenguer IV, count of Provence (Alfonso's son) in 1222.

According to his vida Elias fell in love with (i. e. celebrated) Garsenda of Sabran, the widow of Alfonso II (died 1209), and composed songs for her "as long as she lived", but none of his songs names her explicitly, whereas three of them are dedicated to Beatrice of Savoy, wife of Ramon Berenguer IV, count of Provence. The vida is therefore inaccurate in this case.

He later entered a hospital of the Fratres Pontifices founded by Beneic in Avignon, where he died.

Elias was a practitioner of the trobar leu style. Among his works are a descort, a partimen, and nine cansos; a sirventes, two cansos and another descort have a questionable attribution. Probably around 1200 Elias (but attribution is uncertain) wrote a poem describing the cavalier soissebut (or cavalher benestan: ideal, or model, knight) with his characteristics taken from his contemporaries, in imitation of a work by Bertran de Born in which the domna soissebuda (or dompna soiseubuda) is described by features of the exemplary noblewomen of Bertran's time. Elias constructs this knight for his lady from the "elegance" of Aimar, the "affability" of Giraut IV Trencaleon d'Armagnac, the "generosity" of Randon (a lord of this name died before 1219, when he is mentioned in the testament of his son-in-law; he was the nephew of the troubadour Garin lo Brun), the "good responses" of Dalfi d'Alvernha, the "wits" of Peir cui es Monleos (maybe the troubadour Peire de Gavaret), the "chivalry" of Brian, the "wisdom" of Bertran, the "courtesy" of a Bels Castellas (beautiful castellan), the "conviviality" of a certain Neblos, the "songs" (chansos) of Raimon de Miraval, the "gaiety" (guaieza) of Pons de Capdoill, and the "probity" of Bertran II de la Tor.

Another poem, Ben deu hom son bon senhor, written probably around 1225, has two tornadas referring to Beatrice of Savoy, husband of Ramon Berenguer IV of Provence, and the lord Blacatz respectively. The stanza preceding them is full of praise for the Emperor Frederick II, suzerain of Provence, who had good relations with both Raymond Berengar and Blacatz at the time.

Comtessa Beatris, gran be
aug de vos dir e retraire,
quar del mon etz la belaire,
de las autras dompnas qu'om ve.

Countess Beatrice, great good
I hear said and related of you,
for you are the most beautiful
of the ladies seen in the world.

Besides Beatrice and Blacatz, Elias wrote poems to Jaufre Reforzat de Trets and Ferdinand III of Castile-León.

== Sources ==
- Egan, Margarita, ed. and trans. The Vidas of the Troubadours. New York: Garland, 1984. ISBN 0-8240-9437-9.
- Gaunt, Simon, and Kay, Sarah (edd.) The Troubadours: An Introduction. Cambridge: Cambridge University Press, 1999. ISBN 0-521-57473-0.
- Harvey, Ruth. "Courtly culture in medieval Occitania" (pp. 8–27). The Troubadours: An Introduction. Simon Gaunt and Sarah Kay, edd. Cambridge: Cambridge University Press, 1999. ISBN 0-521-57473-0.
- Stronski, Stanislas, ed. Le Troubadour Elias de Barjols. Toulouse: Edouard Privat, 1906.
- Topsfield, L. T. "Raimon de Miraval and the Art of Courtly Love." The Modern Language Review, 51:1 (January 1956), pp. 33–41.
