= Raymond Agoult =

Conductor and composer

Raymond A. Agoult (1 July 1911 – 20 July 1992), was a conductor and composer.

There is very little written about him. Hungarian born, Agoult lived in London on Fellows Road in the St. John's Wood district. In 1954, the BBC considered him to conduct their Scottish Variety Orchestra. but in early 1955 the job instead went to Michael Collins. Agoult was instead invited to form a new light orchestra for the Morning Music and Music While You Work radio programmes. This became known as Raymond Agoult and His Players, sixteen members strong. This combination broadcast until 1966. In the late 1960s he sometimes conducted the BBC Radio Orchestra, and in the 1970s he formed the Raymond Agoult Master Band for Brass and Strings, Listen to the Band and Friday Night Is Music Night.

He conducted two albums, both for Decca Records. These albums were coproductions with RCA Victor, utilizing Decca engineers and producers. The recordings were first released by RCA Victor in the U.S. in the early stereo era, and reissued by Decca (London) later:

- Overture! Overture (released in November 1957 on RCA Victor LM 2134 and September 1959 on LSC 2134 and also on in March 1958 on RD 27044 and reissued in 1971 on London STS 15223 (then titled Favorite Overtures, and including some additional overtures recorded by Albert Wolff) was recorded by producer Erik Smith (stereo) and James Walker (mono) and engineer Cyril Windebank (stereo) and Kenneth Wilkinson (mono) at Kingsway Hall on 9 January – 5 February 1957. This album was also released under the title Overtures – in Spades (RCA Victor LM 2134). Six overtures by four composers were included.
- Clair de Lune (released in October 1959 on RCA Victor LSC 2326 and reissued in 1970 on London STS 15160) was recorded by engineer Kenneth Wilkinson and producer Michael Williamson on 28–31 May 1958 at Walthamstow Assembly Hall. This was also released by Decca in November 1970 on SPA 111 and by RCA Victor in May 1960 on SF 5054. Nine light classical pieces are included.

Each of these albums became audiophile standards highly rated for their sound qualities. They were re-released as vinyl records decades later by Classic Records under license from PolyGram Special Markets with their original RCA artwork and liner notes and "shaded dog" record labels intact.

The New Symphony Orchestra of London and the London Proms Symphony Orchestra (recording orchestras) are listed on these recordings. These are apparently the same orchestra since for Clair de Lune, RCA listed the London Proms Symphony Orchestra and the later London reissue listed The New Symphony Orchestra of London.

== Compositions and arrangements ==
Amongst Agoult’s compositions for band are Bulgarian Bugle Boy (which was recorded by The Scottish C.W.S. Band on Pye GSGL 10430). Agoult also composed two additional compositions for band, Culloden and Caramba!. His Caramba! is likely the work heard on the LP What We Want is Watney's Silver Band issued on MFP 1303. Other compositions for light orchestra include Bessie Larkin, La Canniebiere, Honouring the Haggis, Madame Guillotine,Bulgarian Bugle BoyBack to Baroque and Betty Dear, the latter composition being dedicated to his wife. Agoult also made an arrangement of When Johnny Comes Marching Home which can be heard on a recording with the Band of the Grenadier Guards on Entertainment Sales ESI-106. Other arrangements for band by Agoult include the Coronation March from Le prophète by Giacomo Meyerbeer and the Grand March from Aida" by Giuseppe Verdi.
