= Entrevennes =

- Commune
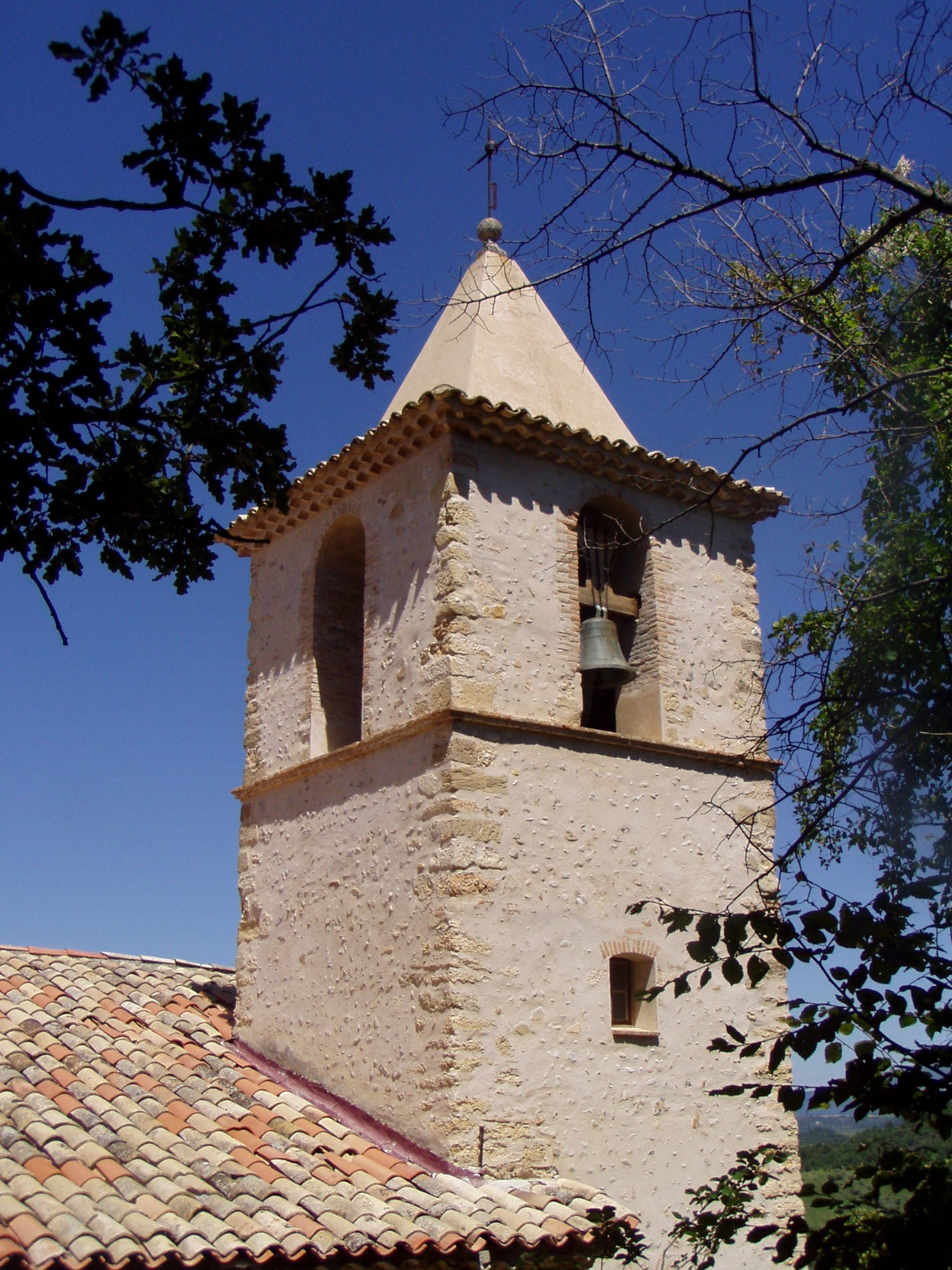
- The bell tower of the church in Entrevennes

- Coat of arms
- Location of Entrevennes
- Location within France Location within Provence-Alpes-Côte d'Azur
- Coordinates: 43°56′19″N 6°01′26″E
- Country: France
- Region: Provence-Alpes-Côte d'Azur
- Department: Alpes-de-Haute-Provence
- Arrondissement: Forcalquier
- Canton: Riez
- Intercommunality: Durance-Luberon-Verdon Agglomération

Government
  - Mayor (2026–32): Jérôme Blanc
- Area^{1}: 29.81 km^{2} (11.51 sq mi)
- Elevation: 600 m (2,000 ft)
- Highest elevation: 800 m (2,600 ft)
- Lowest elevation: 451 m (1,480 ft)
- Population (2023): 163
  - Density: 5.47/km^{2} (14.2/sq mi)
- Time zone: UTC+01:00 (CET)
  - Summer (DST): UTC+02:00 (CEST)
- INSEE/Postal code: 04077 /04700
- ^{1} French Land Register data, which excludes lakes, ponds, glaciers > 1 km^{2} (0.386 sq mi or 247 acres) and river estuaries.

Entrevennes (French pronunciation: [ɑ̃tʁəvɛn]; Occitan: Entrevenas) is a commune in the Alpes-de-Haute-Provence department in southeastern France.

== Population ==
Historical population
Year	Pop.	±% p.a.
1968	104	—
1975	98	−0.85%
1982	109	+1.53%
1990	128	+2.03%
1999	163	+2.72%
2007	163	+0.00%
2012	164	+0.12%
2017	168	+0.48%
2023	163	−0.50%
Source: INSEE

In French, its inhabitants are referred to with the demonym "Entrevennois".

== Personalities ==
The troubadour Isnart d'Entrevenas was lord of Entrevennes in the early thirteenth century.

== See also ==
- Communes of the Alpes-de-Haute-Provence department
