= Jaufre Reforzat de Trets =

13th-century French troubadour

Jaufre Reforzat de Trets (Latin: Gaufridus Reforciatus; fl. 1213–1237), known as Jaufrezet, was the viscount of Marseille, lord of Trets and Forcalquier, and a man of letters. He was a member of the Baus family, the son of Raymond Geoffrey II of Marseille.

Jaufre was recorded as viscount of Marseille as early as 1213. His father died in 1216 or 1217 and he ruled the patrimony with his younger brother Bergundio d'Agoult. By charter dated 21 June 1217 he granted rights in Allauch to Peter, Bishop of Marseille. In 1228 he became lord of Rocharon and in 1231 castellan of Château-Réal. Jaufre may have been the father of Beatrice, wife of Isnart d'Entrevenas.

Jaufre was deeply connected within the troubadour culture. He wrote a sirventes attacking Guilhem dels Baus, his nominal overlord as King of Arles. He got involved in the poetical disputes and mudslinging between fellow troubadours Sordello and Peire Bremon Ricas Novas and wrote a sirventes attacking both of them. He also wrote a partimen with Elias de Barjols, which is where his nickname "Jaufrezet" is first recorded. He was also the judge of several other partimens: between Blacatz and Guilhem de San Gregori and between Peirol, Guionet and Pomairol.
