= Crusades =

Religious wars of the High Middle Ages

14th-century miniature of the Battle of Dorylaeum (1147), a Second Crusade battle, from the Estoire d'Eracles

The Crusades were a series of military campaigns launched by the papacy between 1095 and 1291 against Muslim rulers for the recovery and defence of the Holy Land, as part of a wider crusading movement. The First Crusade was proclaimed by Pope Urban II at the Council of Clermont in November 1095—a call to arms for Christians to reconquer Jerusalem from the Muslims, with promises of spiritual reward. By this time, the papacy's position as head of the Catholic Church had strengthened, and earlier conflicts with secular rulers and wars on the frontiers of Western Christendom had prepared it for the direction of armed force in religious causes. The successes of the First Crusade led to the establishment of four Crusader states in the Levant—the Kingdom of Jerusalem, the Principality of Antioch, and the counties of Tripoli and Edessa—whose defence required further expeditions from Catholic Europe. The organisation of such large-scale campaigns demanded complex religious, social, and economic institutions, including crusade indulgences, military orders, and the taxation of clerical income. Over time, the crusading movement expanded to include campaigns against pagans, Christian dissidents, and other enemies of the papacy, promoted with similar spiritual rewards and continuing into the 18th century. (Note: The List of Crusades delineates the numbered Crusades and other Holy Land expeditions through the 17th century, the Northern Crusades, Iberian Crusades, popular Crusades and Crusades against Christians.)

The Crusade of 1101, the earliest papally sanctioned expedition inspired by the First Crusade, ended in disastrous defeats. For several decades thereafter, only smaller expeditions reached the Holy Land, yet their role in consolidating and expanding the Crusader states was pivotal. The fall of Edessa, the capital of the first Crusader state, prompted the Second Crusade, which failed in 1148. Its failure reduced support for crusading across Latin Christendom, leaving the Crusader states unable to resist Saladin's expansion. Having united Egypt and Muslim Syria under his rule, Saladin destroyed their combined armies at the Battle of Hattin in 1187. The Crusader states survived largely owing to the Third Crusade, a major campaign against Saladin, though Jerusalem remained under Muslim control. Initially directed against Egypt, the Fourth Crusade was diverted to the Byzantine Empire, culminating in the Sack of Constantinople and the establishment of the Latin Empire in 1204. The Fifth Crusade again targeted Egypt but failed to conquer it in 1219–21. By this period, crusade indulgences could also be obtained through other campaigns—such as the Iberian, Albigensian, and Northern Crusades—thereby diminishing enthusiasm for expeditions in the eastern Mediterranean.

Jerusalem was regained through negotiation during the Sixth Crusade in 1229, and in 1239–41 the Barons' Crusade restored much of the territory the Crusader states had lost. However, the Sack of Jerusalem by Muslim freebooters soon ended Crusader rule in the Holy City. Louis IX of France launched two major campaigns—the Seventh Crusade against Egypt in 1248–51 and the Eighth Crusade against Tunis in 1270—both of which ended in failure. In place of the large-scale passagium generale, the smaller passagium particulare became the predominant form of crusading campaigns in the late 13th century. The Crusader states, however, were unable to withstand the advance of the Mamluks. Having reunited Egypt and Muslim Syria by 1260, they went on to attack the Crusader states, capturing the Crusaders' last mainland strongholds in 1291. Although plans for the reconquest of the Holy Land continued to be made in the following decades, only the Alexandrian Crusade briefly revived crusading activity in the region in 1365.

== Terminology ==
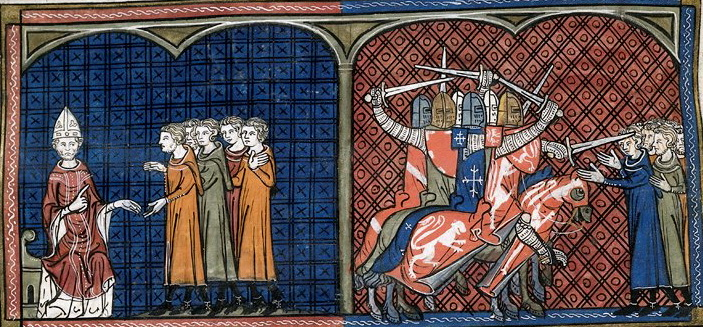
A 14th-century miniature depicting Pope Innocent III excommunicating Cathars and a subsequent massacre of heretics during the Albigensian Crusade in southern France.

The Crusades were military campaigns undertaken by Western Christians to reclaim the Holy Land, or Palestine, from Muslim control between the 11th and 13th centuries. Launched by the papacy with promises of spiritual reward, they were occasionally accompanied by unauthorised movements—driven by popular zeal—commonly referred to as popular crusades. In scholarly usage, the term is frequently applied more broadly to include papally authorised conflicts in other regions, conducted within the wider framework of the crusading movement, including the Iberian, Northern and Albigensian Crusades.

Terminology evolved gradually, primarily reflecting the close association between the Crusades and Christian pilgrimage. Early usage favoured terms denoting mobility—iter ('journey'), expeditio ('expedition'), passagium ('passage')—typically accompanied by references to the intended destination, such as the Church of the Holy Sepulchre in Jerusalem. Other early expressions invoked the crucifixic immissa ('Latin cross') (crux), and by around 1250, canon lawyers were distinguishing between campaigns in the Holy Land—crux transmarina ('the cross overseas')—and those within Europe—crux cismarina ('the cross this side of the sea'). Participants, who traditionally sewed a cross onto their garments, came to be known as crucesignati ('those signed with the cross'). (Note: Although a comparable phrase—hominum multitude cruce signata est ('a multitude of men was signed with the cross')—appears in a late-11th-century papal letter, the earliest attested use of the term crucesignatus occurs in a chapter heading of the Chronicle of Monte Cassino from the mid-12th century.)

Vernacular terminology reflected the ritual of "taking the cross". The earliest attested form, crozada, appeared in Spain in 1212. The Middle English croiserie, derived from Old French, emerged in the 13th–14th centuries, later supplanted by forms such as croisade and crusado, both influenced by Spanish through French. The modern term crusade was established by 1706. The medievalist Thomas Asbridge notes that the term's conventional use by historians imposes "a somewhat misleading aura of coherence and conformity" on the earliest crusading efforts.

== Background ==
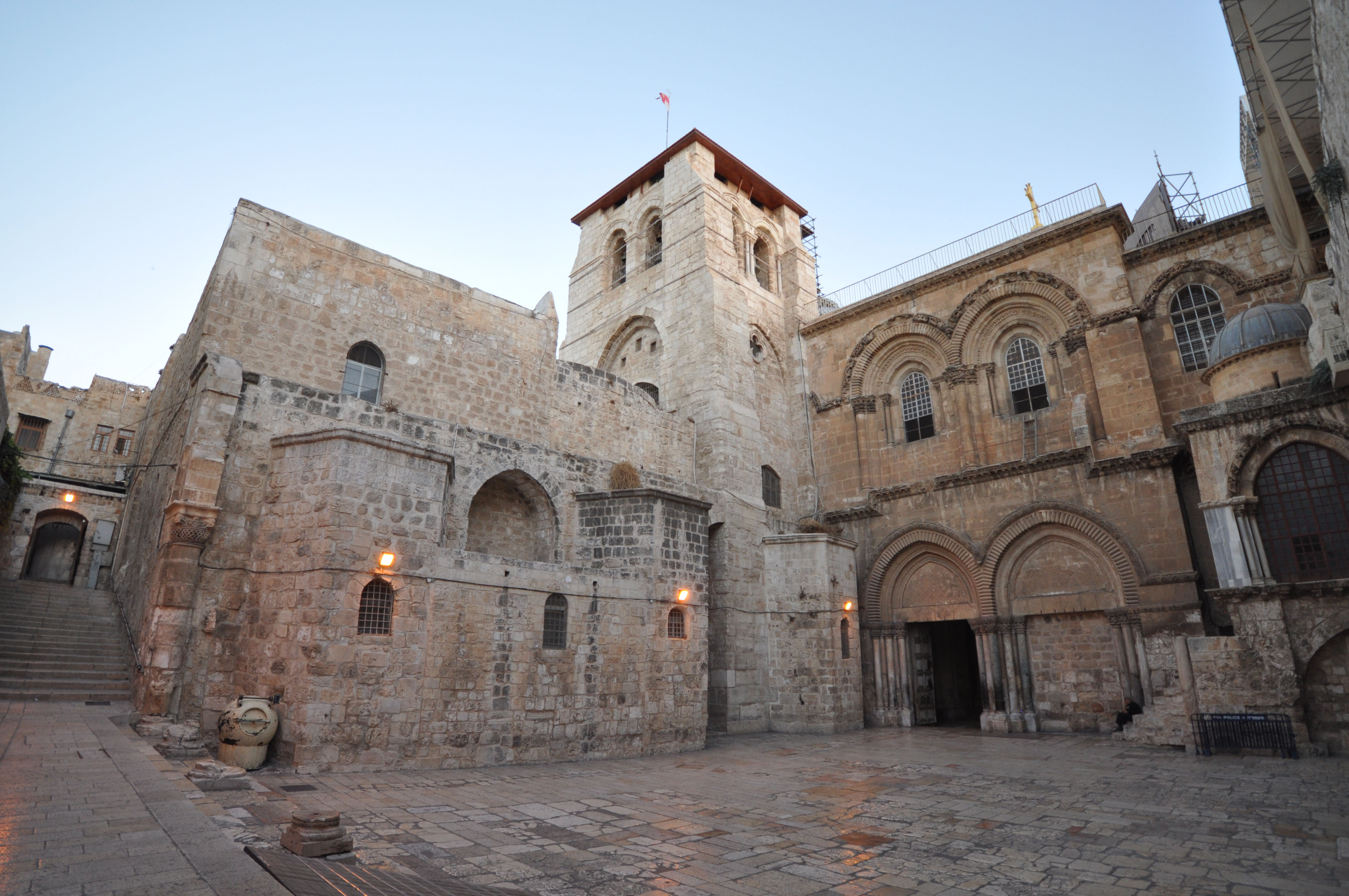
The Church of the Holy Sepulchre in Jerusalem, which was captured by the Seljuk Turks in 1071, triggering the geopolitical crises that led to the Crusades.

Sites linked to Jesus's ministry became popular pilgrimage destinations in Roman Palestine. Christian emperors built churches at these locations, including the Church of the Holy Sepulchre, marking Jesus's crucifixion and resurrection in Jerusalem. In 395, the Roman Empire split into eastern and western halves. The Western Roman Empire had fragmented into smaller kingdoms by 476, while the Eastern Roman (Byzantine) Empire persisted, though it lost vast territories to the rising Islamic Caliphate in the 7th century. Jerusalem fell to Caliph Umar in 638. Islamic expansion, motivated by jihad (holy war), reached Western Europe with the Muslim conquest of much of the Iberian Peninsula after 711. Christians under Muslim rule were dhimmi—legally protected but socially subordinate. Islam's ideological unity fractured over disputes about leadership. The Shi'a believed authority belonged to the descendants of Muhammad's cousin and son-in-law, Ali, while the Sunni majority rejected the Alids' hereditary claim. By the mid-10th century, three rival caliphates had emerged: the Umayyads in al-Andalus (Muslim Spain), the Shi'ite Fatimids in Egypt, and the Abbasids in the Middle East.

To Muslim observers, such as Ibn Khordadbeh, the remote and less developed Western Europe was merely a source of slaves and raw materials. However, between c. 950 and c. 1070, drought and cold spells across North Africa, the Middle East, and Central Asia led to famine and migration. Interfaith tensions escalated, culminating in the temporary destruction of the Holy Sepulchre in 1009. From the 1040s, nomadic Turkomans disrupted the Middle East. In 1055, their leader Tughril I of the Seljuk clan assumed authority within the Abbasid Caliphate with Caliph Al-Qa'im's consent. Tughril's nephew Alp Arslan crushed the Byzantines at the Battle of Manzikert in 1071, opening Anatolia to Turkoman migration. The Seljuk Empire emerged as a loose federation of provinces ruled by Seljuk princes, Turkoman warlords and Arab emirs. As Byzantine control collapsed, Armenian and Greek strongmen took over frontier cities and fortresses.

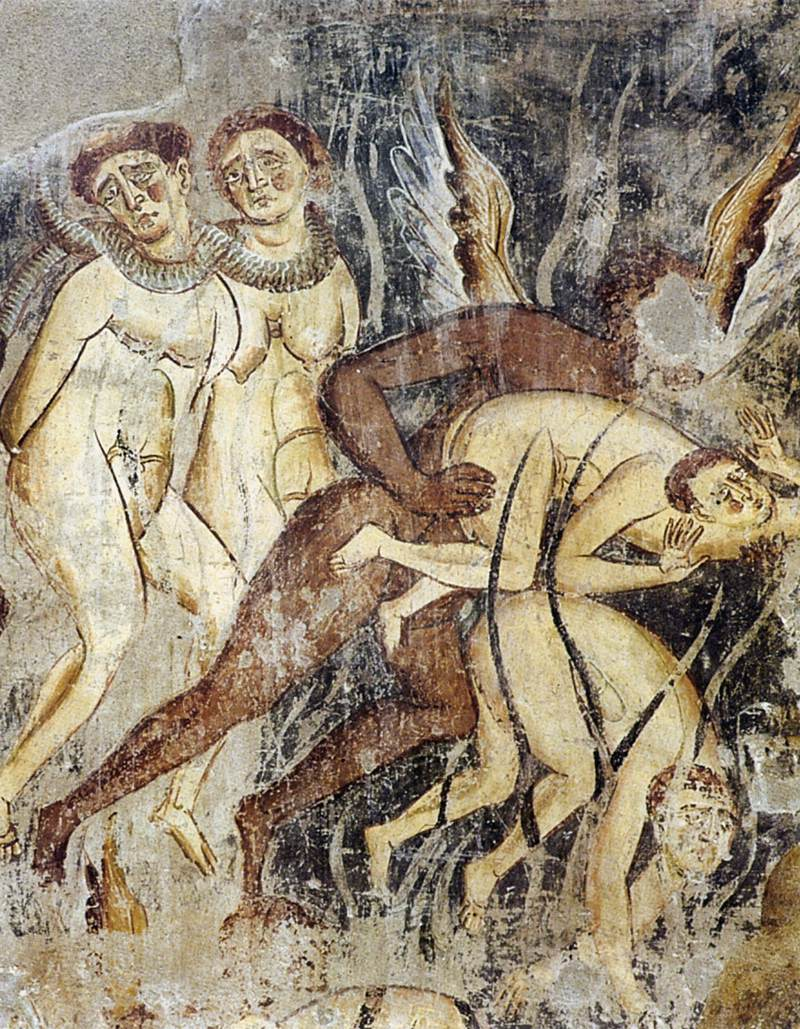
Detail of an 11th-century mural depicting a scene of the Last Judgement in the Abbey of Sant'Angelo in Formis, Italy

From the mid-9th century, central authority in Western Europe weakened, and local lords gained power, commanding heavily armoured knights and holding castles. Their territorial disputes made warfare a regular feature across regions. To protect church property and unarmed groups, church leaders launched the Peace of God movement, threatening offenders with excommunication. As sins permeated daily life, Christians feared damnation. Sinners were expected to confess and undertake priestly prescribed penance. Thousands made the penitential journey to Jerusalem, though attacks on pilgrims became increasingly frequent.

From c. 1000, the Medieval Warm Period favoured Western Europe, spurring economic and population growth. Within a century, Italian merchants supplanted their Muslim and Jewish rivals as the leading force in Mediterranean trade. In 1031, al-Andalus fragmented into taifas—smaller kingdoms—that could not resist the Reconquista—the expansion of the northern Christian states—prompting intervention by the radical Almoravids from the Maghreb. In southern Italy, Norman warriors from northern France founded principalities and completed the conquest of Muslim Sicily by 1091.

In the mid-11th century, clerics promoting the "liberty of the Church" rose to power in Rome, banning simony and clerical marriage. The popes, regarded as successors to Saint Peter in Rome, claimed supremacy over Christendom, but Eastern Christian leaders rejected this. Combined with long-standing liturgical and theological differences, this led to mutual excommunications in 1054 and ultimately the division between the Catholic West and Orthodox East. Reformist clerics' rejection of lay control triggered the Investiture Controversy with secular powers. Popes had already courted allies by offering spiritual rewards, and the Controversy revived interest in the theology of just war, first articulated by Augustine in the 5th century. Theologians, under Pope Gregory VII's auspices, concluded that dying in a just war equated to martyrdom. Still, the idea of penitential warfare drew sharp criticism from anti-papal figures like Sigebert of Gembloux.

== First Crusade ==
By the late 11th century, the development of Christian just war theory, increasing aristocratic piety, and the popularity of penitential journeys to the Holy Land created a context for armed pilgrimages. Strengthened by the church reforms, the papacy was well positioned to channel anxiety over sin and hopes of remission into a papally orchestrated war. In 1074, Gregory VII was the first pope to plan a campaign against the Turkomans, though it was never launched. In March 1095, his successor, Urban II, received envoys from Emperor Alexios I Komnenos, who requested military aid at the Council of Piacenza.

By this time, the Seljuk Empire had descended into civil war following the deaths of Vizier Nizam al-Mulk and Sultan Malik-Shah I in 1092. Malik-Shah's brother Tutush I contested the succession of Malik-Shah's son Berkyaruq. Although Tutush was killed in battle in 1095, his sons Ridwan and Duqaq, seized control of the Syrian cities of Aleppo and Damascus, respectively, while Tutush's former mamluk (slave soldier), Yaghi-Siyan, maintained his rule over Antioch. In Anatolia, the breakaway Seljuk prince Kilij Arslan I founded the independent Sultanate of Rum, while an autonomous Turkoman clan, the Danishmendids, seized control of the north.

Meanwhile, Fatimid Egypt faced its own succession crisis after the deaths of Caliph al-Mustansir and his vizier al-Jamali. Al-Jamali's son and successor al-Afdal Shahanshah installed al-Mustansir's youngest son al-Musta'li as caliph bypassing the eldest son Nizar. Although Nizar was murdered, his supporters rejected al-Musta'li's legitimacy and established a new branch of radical Shi'a Islam—the Nizaris, also known as the Assassins.

=== Council of Clermont and its aftermath ===
In July 1095, Pope Urban began a tour of France, negotiating with local elites, and ending with the Council of Clermont. Here, on 27 November, he announced a military campaign against the Turkomans. According to most accounts, he urged military support for eastern Christians, promising spiritual rewards, and condemning knightly violence. Accounts differ on whether he promised reduced penance or full remission of sin. Urban's appeal reportedly prompted the crowd to cry Deus vult! ('God wills it!'). The ritual of "taking the cross" was introduced on the spot, with Bishop Adhemar of Le Puy setting the precedent. He was soon appointed papal legate.

Urban held further councils in France, and set 15 August—two weeks after the harvest began—as the campaign's start date. His message spread mainly through those present at Clermont, leaving much of Western Europe unaware of the crusade. He also urged Catalan counts not to join, granting them equal spiritual rewards for fighting the Almoravids, marking an early instance of crusading in Iberia.

=== People's Crusade ===
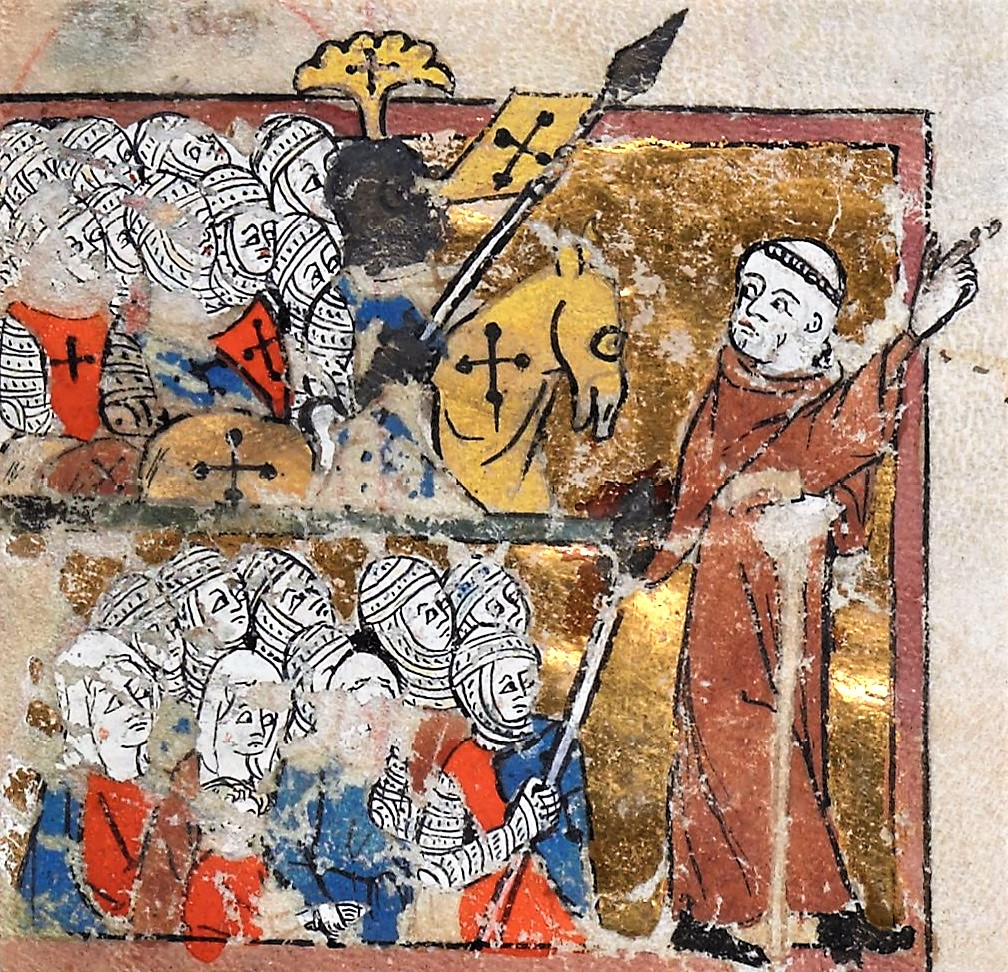
Miniature of Peter the Hermit leading the People's Crusade (from a 14th-century manuscript of the Abreujamen de las estorias)

Pope Urban sought to restrict enlistment to trained warriors, but popular enthusiasm proved uncontrollable. The charismatic Peter the Hermit preached in regions Urban had avoided, reportedly bearing a heavenly letter urging the expulsion of "pagans" from the Holy Land. He attracted thousands of peasants and townsfolk, alongside some nobles such as Walter Sans Avoir. In Germany, the preachers Folkmar and Gottschalk assembled similar groups.

Several contingents departed before the harvest, from March 1096. Walter and Peter each led forces of 10,000–15,000. While travelling, Peter threatened Jewish communities in pursuit of provisions. King Coloman of Hungary granted market access, but during their passage the host, by then c. 20,000 people, plundered the border town of Zemun. Entering Byzantine territory in June, their continued looting provoked imperial raids, causing severe losses. Meanwhile, Folkmar and Gottschalk's 15,000-strong host was destroyed by Coloman on Hungary's western frontier in July. A parallel rising under the Swabian count Emicho launched the anti-Jewish Rhineland massacres in western Germany, beginning at Speyer on 3 May 1096. Despite episcopal efforts at protection, his force spread anti-semitic violence until Hungarian troops dispersed it in mid-July.

Walter reached Constantinople on 20 July, Peter on 1 August. Distrustful of their disorder, Emperor Alexios shipped them across the Bosporus to Anatolia. Germans captured the Seljuk fortress of Xerigordos, but it was retaken by the Turkomans on 29 September. Kilij Arslan destroyed the crusaders at Civetot on 21 October; Peter survived with a few followers.

=== Princes' Crusade ===
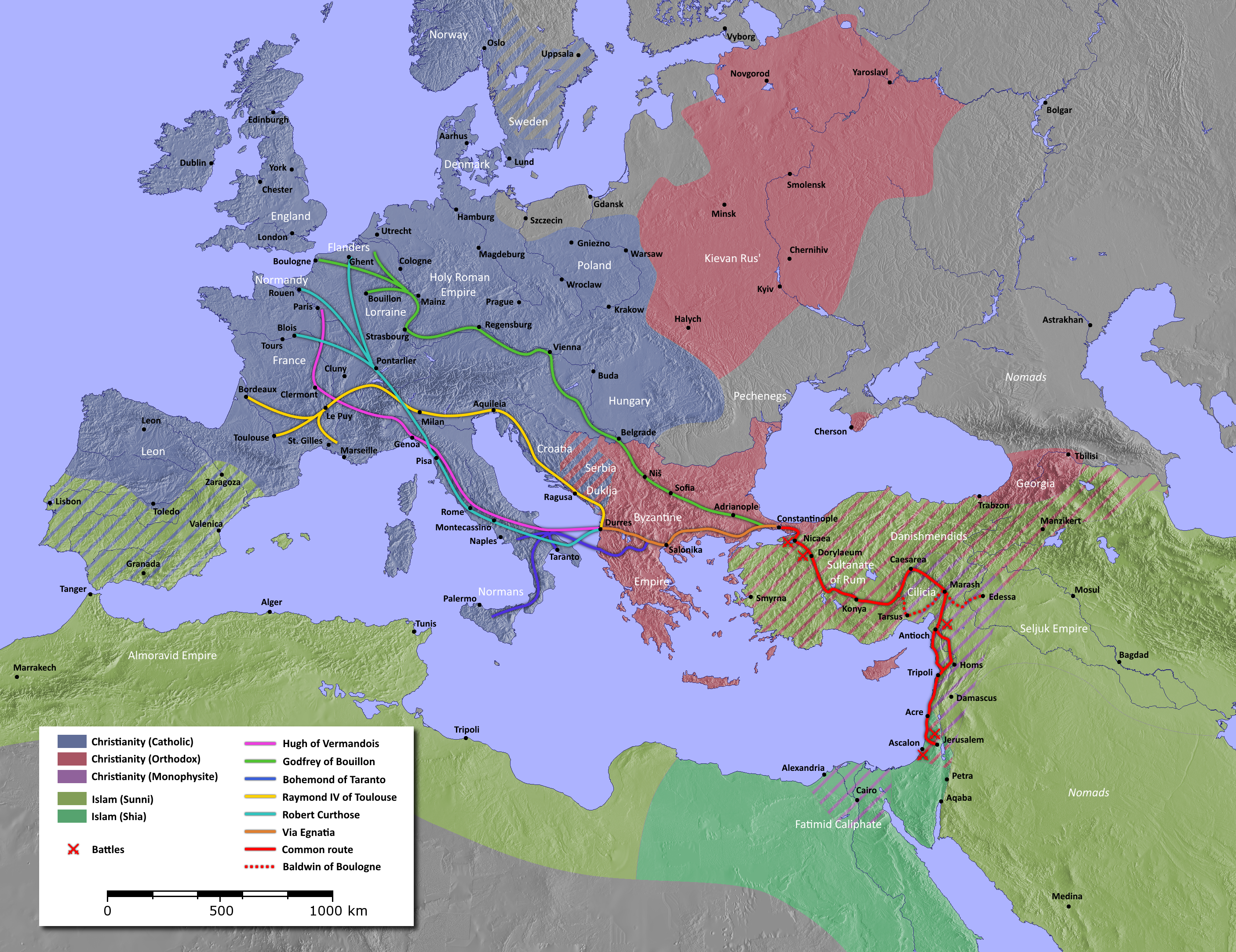
Map of the Princes' Crusade (1096–1099)

No crowned ruler joined the First Crusade, largely because of tensions with the Church. The first major noble to depart was Hugh of Vermandois, brother of King Philip I of France. Godfrey of Bouillon, Duke of Lower Lorraine, set off in August 1096, followed by Bohemond of Taranto, a veteran of anti-Byzantine campaigns, in October, and Raymond of Saint-Gilles, Count of Toulouse, who led the largest force. Other leaders included Robert Curthose, Duke of Normandy; Stephen of Blois; and Robert II of Flanders. Their armies, as the historian Thomas Madden notes, were "a curious mix of rich and poor, saints and sinners", motivated by both faith and gain. As a knight's participation could cost four years' income, it was often financed through loans or donations; the less wealthy joined noble retinues.

At Constantinople, tensions with the Byzantines resulted in skirmishes. Emperor Alexios demanded oaths from the crusader leaders to return former Byzantine lands before allowing passage into Anatolia. The crusading host numbered 60,000–100,000, including 30,000 non-combatants and up to 7,000 knights. Exploiting Seljuk distractions, the crusaders and Byzantines captured Nicaea in June 1097 and advanced toward Antioch, once a Byzantine provincial capital in Syria. They repelled Kilij Arslan's lightly armoured cavalry at the Battle of Dorylaeum.

After a gruelling march, c. 40,000 crusaders reached Antioch and began the city's prolonged siege in October 1097. During this time, Baldwin of Boulogne—Godfrey's brother—left with 100 knights and, with Armenian support, seized fortresses and the city of Edessa, founding the first Crusader state, the County of Edessa, in March 1098. The Seljuk general Kerbogha assembled a 40,000-strong army in Iraq, but arrived in June after Bohemond had secured Antioch through collusion with a guard. The crusaders massacred the Muslim inhabitants and some of the native Christians. Despite famine, disease, and desertion, they—encouraged by the mystic Peter Bartholomew—defeated Kerbogha at the Battle of Antioch on 28 June 1098.

The march on Jerusalem was halted due to intense summer heat and a plague that claimed Adhemar of Le Puy's life. In the Byzantines' absence, Bohemond persuaded the other leaders to recognise his rule over Antioch, establishing a new Crusader state, the Principality of Antioch. The crusade resumed under pressure from the common soldiers in November. After massacring the defenders of Ma'arra, the crusaders were granted safe passage by local Muslim rulers. They reached Jerusalem, then held by a Fatimid governor, on 7 June 1099. The siege stalled until Genoese craftsmen arrived with supplies. Their siege towers enabled the crusaders to conquer the city on 15 July. Over the next two days, they slaughtered the population and looted the city. Godfrey was elected Jerusalem's first Western ruler, while Arnulf of Chocques, a Norman priest, was named the first Latin patriarch. Meanwhile, al-Afdal mobilised c. 20,000 Egyptian troops to retake the city, but the crusaders—roughly 9,000 infantry and 1,200 knights—defeated his army at the Battle of Ascalon on 12 August. With their vow fulfilled, most crusaders returned home, leaving Godfrey with just 300 knights and 2,000 foot soldiers.

== Conquest, consolidation and defence ==
The historian Malcolm Barber notes that the Crusader states' creation "committed western Europeans to crusading for the foreseeable future". In the century after the First Crusade, the resurgence of Muslim unity shaped Middle Eastern history. During the first half of this period, the Franks sought Western military aid only four times; between 1149 and 1186, they made at least sixteen such appeals.

=== Aftermath of the First Crusade ===
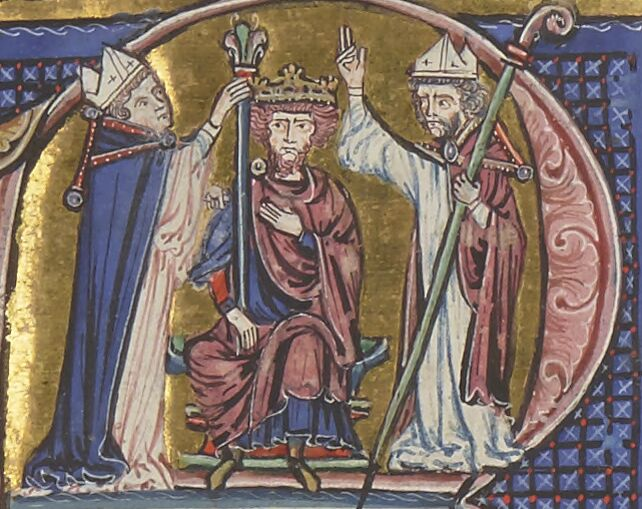
Baldwin of Boulogne is crowned as the first king of Jerusalem (a miniature from the late 13th-century Histoire d'Outremer).

The Italian merchant republics pledged naval aid for the crusade but needed time to prepare. The Pisan fleet of 120 ships arrived under Archbishop Daimbert in September 1099. As papal legate, he deposed Arnulf and was installed patriarch on Christmas Day, with Godfrey and Bohemond doing homage to him. Meanwhile, Tancred, Bohemond's nephew, completed the conquest of Galilee.

Vitale I Michiel, Doge of Venice, soon arrived with over 200 ships. After Godfrey's unexpected death on 18 July 1100, the Venetians helped Tancred take Haifa. Daimbert, seeking to make Jerusalem an ecclesiastical lordship, lost support when Bohemond was captured by the Danishmendid Gazi Gümüshtigin in August. Meanwhile, Godfrey's followers invited Baldwin of Boulogne to succeed him. Before going to Jerusalem, Baldwin granted Edessa to his cousin Baldwin of Bourcq, then seized Jerusalem and forced Daimbert to crown him king on Christmas Day. Within nine months, he captured Arsuf and Caesarea with Genoese aid, and defeated a superior Egyptian force at the First Battle of Ramla.

=== Crusade of 1101 ===
After Antioch's capture, crusader leaders wrote to senior Catholic clerics urging them to rally oath-breakers. In December 1100, Pope Urban's successor Paschal II launched a new crusade. Nicknamed the "Crusade of the Faint-Hearted", it included deserters such as Stephen of Blois and Hugh of Vermandois. The first contingent, led by Anselm, Archbishop of Milan and Albert of Biandrate, left Lombardy in September 1100. The Lombards reportedly aimed at Baghdad or Egypt, and even attacked the Blachernae Palace in Constantinople before being ferried to Anatolia in early 1101.

They were soon joined by French and German forces led by William IX of Aquitaine, William II of Nevers, Welf I of Bavaria, the widowed Marchioness Ida of Austria, and Archbishop Thiemo of Salzburg. Reaching Constantinople in June, they met Raymond of Saint-Gilles. Ignoring his and Stephen's warnings, the Lombards pressed to free Bohemond. Joined by other crusaders, they advanced into eastern Anatolia, but were crushed at the Battle of Mersivan in August by a coalition of Turkoman rulers. William of Nevers' army, heading south, was almost destroyed at Heraclea, where a third mainly German force was also routed. Ida vanished, later giving rise to tales she became mother of the powerful Turkoman ruler Zengi.

The failure of the 1101 Crusade shattered crusader invincibility, with Westerners chiefly blaming Byzantines. Few survived. William of Aquitaine, Welf, and Stephen regrouped at Antioch, aiding Raymond and Genoese allies in capturing Tortosa. Some, including Stephen, reached the Holy Land, where he died at the Second Battle of Ramla on 17 May 1102. On that occasion Egyptians caught the crusaders by surprise, but survivors redeemed themselves at the Battle of Jaffa ten days later.

=== Bohemond's crusade ===
Bohemond I of Antioch marries Constance, the daughter of King Philip I during his visit to France.

Bohemond of Antioch secured his release by ransom, exploiting Danishmendid–Seljuk conflict. He supported Baldwin II of Edessa in an attack on Harran, but in May 1104, Jikirmish, atabeg (governor) of Mosul, defeated them at the Battle of Harran. Jikirmish's victory allowed Ridwan to retake border fortresses, while the Byzantines expelled Antiochene garrisons from Cilicia.

Seeking support in the West, Bohemond left Tancred in charge of Antioch in autumn 1104. Pope Paschal named Bishop Bruno of Segni as papal legate to promote a crusade for Jerusalem in France. Though highly regarded, Bohemond drew only lesser nobles like Hugh of Le Puiset and Robert of Vieux-Pont to take the cross. He then chose to invade the Byzantine Empire from Italy, accusing the Byzantines of heresy. In October 1107, he besieged the fortress of Dyrrachium, but Alexios had reinforced its defences, allied with Venetians, and, with Turkoman mercenaries, blockaded Bohemond's army. Bohemond had to withdraw and accept Byzantine suzerainty over Antioch in the 1108 Treaty of Devol, but Tancred did not implement the treaty.

=== Coastal towns ===
King Baldwin I of Jerusalem expanded his realm to secure defence and attract knights with rewards. Naval aid for coastal conquests came from Pisans, Genoese, and Venetians, compensated with trade privileges. He captured Acre in 1104 and Beirut and Sidon in 1110. Sigurd I of Norway, the first crowned monarch on crusade, assisted at Sidon. Baldwin's position was strengthened by Duqaq of Damascus's death. Though Duqaq's successor, Toghtekin joined an Egyptian invasion, the Muslim coalition was defeated at the Third Battle of Ramla in 1105. Around the same time, the Damascene scholar Ali ibn Tahir al-Sulami urged Muslim unity in jihad against the Franks.

Raymond of Saint Gilles began the Siege of Tripoli in 1103 but died within two years. A dispute between his son Bertrand of Toulouse and cousin William Jordan was resolved by King Baldwin at the Council of Tripoli. Soon after, Frankish forces with Genoese aid seized the city in July 1109. William Jordan was killed, leaving Bertrand sole ruler of the County of Tripoli.

Tripoli's fall alarmed the Muslim world. The Seljuk sultan Muhammad I Tapar ordered Mawdud, atabeg of Mosul to invade, but his campaigns of 1110–13 failed amid desertions. In 1115 his successor Aqsunqur also failed at Edessa. That year Toghtekin sheltered his kinsman Ilghazi, angering the Sultan. Toghtekin allied with Tancred's successor in Antioch, Roger, who defeated the Sultan's army at the Battle of Sarmin on 14 September 1115. Meanwhile, Ridwan's death in 1113 sparked a succession crisis in Aleppo, enabling Roger to exact tribute from the city.

=== Venetian Crusade ===
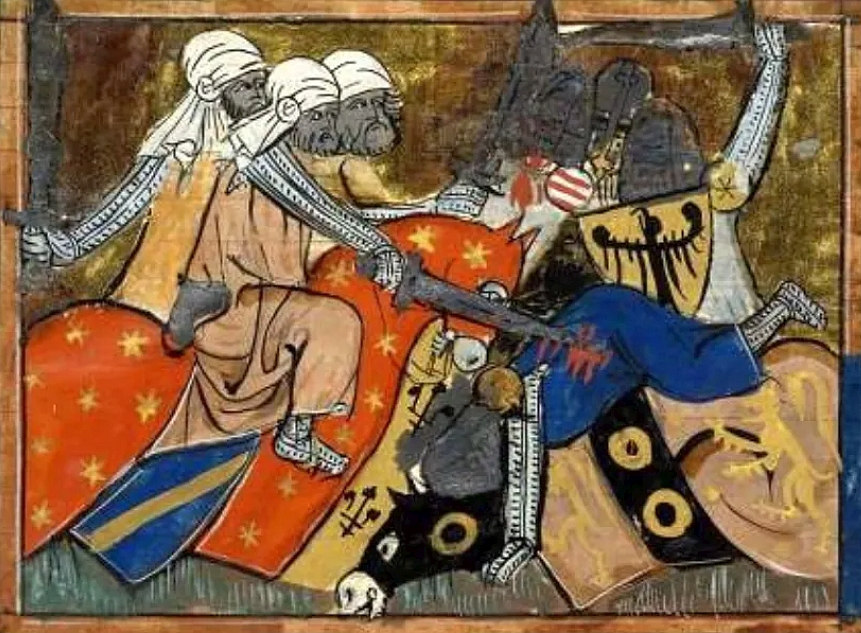
Battle of the Field of Blood (a miniature from the 1337 manuscript of William of Tyre's Historia)

Baldwin I of Jerusalem died of illness during a campaign against Egypt on 2 April 1118. He was succeeded by Baldwin of Bourcq, who ceded Edessa to his kinsman Joscelin I. Facing Roger of Antioch's repeated demands for tribute, the Aleppans appealed to Ilghazi, who with Toghtekin's aid invaded Antiochene lands. They defeated Roger at the Battle of the Field of Blood on 28 June 1119, where some 700 knights and 3,000 infantry perished along with Roger. Antioch was saved by Baldwin II of Jerusalem, who became regent for the absent Bohemond II, son of Bohemond I.

Amid famine and military disaster, Jerusalem's leaders met at the Council of Nablus in 1120, issuing decrees against sexual offences such as sodomy and relations with Muslims. Patriarch Warmund approved Hugues de Payens' knightly confraternity, whose members vowed poverty, chastity, obedience, and protection of pilgrims. This marked the birth of the military orders. Baldwin II installed them in the former Al-Aqsa Mosque, identified by the Franks as Solomon's Temple, whence their name Knights Templar.

Seeking aid, Baldwin II sent envoys to the West. Pope Paschal urged the Venetian doge Domenico Michiel to lead a naval expedition. As regent Baldwin prioritised Antioch's defence, though it was unpopular in Jerusalem. After Ilghazi's death, his nephew Belek Ghazi captured Joscelin and, in April 1123, Baldwin himself. In his absence Patriarch Warmund concluded the Pactum Warmundi with Venice, securing the conquest of Tyre on 7 July 1124. Baldwin returned to Jerusalem in April 1125.

=== Crusade of 1129 ===
Aqsunqur united Aleppo and Mosul, recovering much territory from the Franks before his assassination in 1126. That year Bohemond II assumed power in Antioch, but his conflict with Joscelin I of Edessa prevented him from exploiting unrest in Aleppo. In 1127 the Turkoman commander Zengi became atabeg of Mosul.

In preparation for a major offensive against Damascus, Baldwin II of Jerusalem sent envoys to Europe to raise troops and arrange the marriage of his heir, Melisende. Her betrothal to Fulk V of Anjou included the promise of joint succession. In May 1128 Toghtekin of Damascus died, succeeded by his son Buri, while Zengi reunited Aleppo with Mosul.

Fulk arrived in May 1129 and married Melisende. Though lacking papal sanction, the Crusade of 1129 drew some 60,000 warriors. The Franks invaded Damascene territory in November, but a sortie routed their foragers. On hearing of this, the main force withdrew, perhaps also driven by a violent storm.

=== Internal conflicts ===
The Crusader states in 1135

In February 1130 Bohemond II of Antioch was killed in a skirmish. His widow Alice—daughter of Baldwin II of Jerusalem—sought power with Zengi's support, but Baldwin assumed the regency for her daughter by Bohemond, Constance. When Baldwin died on 21 August 1131, Fulk and Melisende succeeded him in Jerusalem, while Fulk secured the regency in Antioch by defeating Alice's allies Pons of Tripoli and Joscelin II of Edessa. Muslim pressure mounted: Zengi plundered Antioch and Edessa, and Buri's successor, Ismail of Damascus raided Jerusalemite and Tripolitan lands, causing Pons's death.

In 1136, Fulk arranged Constance's marriage to the French Raymond of Poitiers. The next year Raymond did homage to Byzantine emperor John II Komnenos, but John's campaigns against Aleppo and Shaizar failed. Zengi took Homs, but his assault on Damascus was repelled by the city's new ruler Unur allied with Fulk. Fulk died in a hunting accident on 10 November 1143. His reign saw the Hospitallers evolve from a nursing confraternity into a military order. The widowed Melisende resisted sharing power with their son Baldwin III.

=== Second Crusade ===
In the early 1140s Zengi sought dominance over Muslim rivals, notably the Artuqids in Iraq. Kara Arslan, an Artuqid prince, sought aid from Joscelin II of Edessa, offering land in exchange. Joscelin accepted, provoking Zengi to besiege Edessa. When the city fell on 26 December 1144, most of its Frankish population was killed or enslaved. Zengi was assassinated in 1146, but when Joscelin briefly regained Edessa, Zengi's son Nur al-Din expelled him and the Turkomans massacred fleeing Christians. Nur al-Din destroyed the city's fortifications, making its reconquest futile. He secured a marriage alliance with Unur of Damascus.

News of Edessa's fall reached Pope Eugenius III through Bishop Hugh of Jabala and Armenian clergy. He responded with the bull Quantum praedecessores on 1 December 1145, granting remission of sins, protection of property, and debt suspension to those who took the cross—establishing the model for later crusade bulls. Louis VII of France, troubled by guilt over a massacre in a church, declared his intention to lead a crusade. At Vézelay in 1146 the Cistercian abbot Bernard of Clairvaux persuaded many French nobles to join.

Bernard went on preaching across France and Germany. In the Rhineland, anti-semitic pogroms incited by the monk Radulf ended only after Bernard recalled him. In a Christmas sermon Bernard persuaded Conrad III of Germany to take the cross at Speyer. When Saxon lords resisted abandoning war against the pagan Wends, he convinced Pope Eugenius to issue the bull Divina dispensatione in April 1147, extending crusade indulgences to the Wendish campaign, later seen as the first Northern Crusade. The Pope also named Iberia as a crusading target. A critic to the Wendish campaign, Helmold of Bosau later described the Second Crusade as fought in three theatres—the Holy Land, the Baltic and Iberia. Despite leadership by nobles such as the Saxon duke Henry the Lion, the crusaders failed against the Wendish prince Niklot.

The crusaders departed for the Holy Land in May and June 1147. A distinctive feature was the prominent presence of women: Louis VII was joined by his wife Eleanor of Aquitaine and her household, while regulations for the crusader fleet mention wives. The fleet of 150 ships carried about 10,000 crusaders from northwestern Europe. They aided Afonso I of Portugal in his successful Siege of Lisbon in October 1147 and Ramon Berenguer IV of Barcelona in capturing Tortosa in December 1148, but only a small contingent reached the Holy Land.

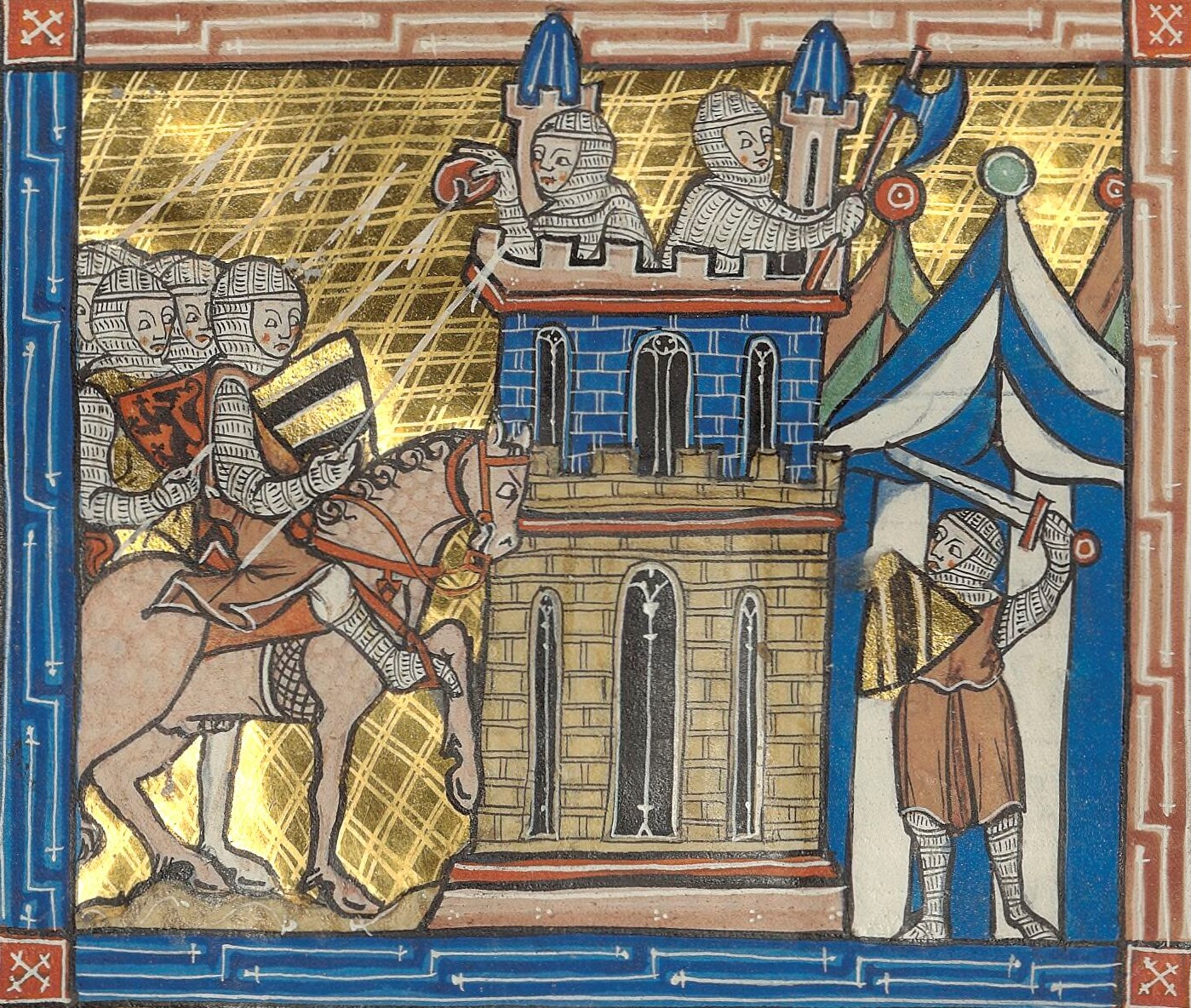
Siege of Damascus (1148) (a miniature from a 13th-14th–century manuscript of William of Tyre's Historia)

The German army, with many pilgrims, retraced the First Crusade's route through Hungary and the Balkans. Emperor Manuel I Komnenos, fearing attack, made peace with Mesud I, Sultan of Rum. Roger II of Sicily invaded the Balkans, heightening Byzantine suspicion of a coordinated western action. After clashes at Constantinople, the Germans crossed into Anatolia without waiting for the French. On 25 October 1147 Mesud's forces crushed them at the Battle of Dorylaeum; many died, but Conrad, wounded, escaped into Byzantine territory.

The French reached Constantinople in October 1147. Clashes followed, and Bishop Godefroy of Langres urged Louis VII to seize the city, but he advanced into Anatolia. The crusaders endured shortages, desertions and raids while wintering at Ephesus. At Antalya Louis and his knights sailed for Syria on Byzantine ships; most left behind perished, deserted or were enslaved.

Louis reached Antioch on 19 March 1148. Raymond of Poitiers urged an attack on Aleppo and Shaizar, but Louis pressed on to Jerusalem, despite Eleanor—Raymond's niece—supporting her uncle. At Acre he joined Conrad, who had arrived by sea from Constantinople. The Council of Acre resolved to besiege Damascus, beginning on 24 July. Though Conrad repelled attacks, Damascene raids and news of Nur al-Din's approaching reinforcements soon forced the crusaders to abandon the siege. A plan to attack Ascalon, the last Fatimid port, also collapsed, and the crusaders withdrew from the Holy Land. The failure gravely weakened crusading fervour in Europe. Conrad blamed Jerusalem's leaders, while others, including Bernard of Clairvaux, accused the Byzantines.

=== Towards Muslim unity in the Levant ===
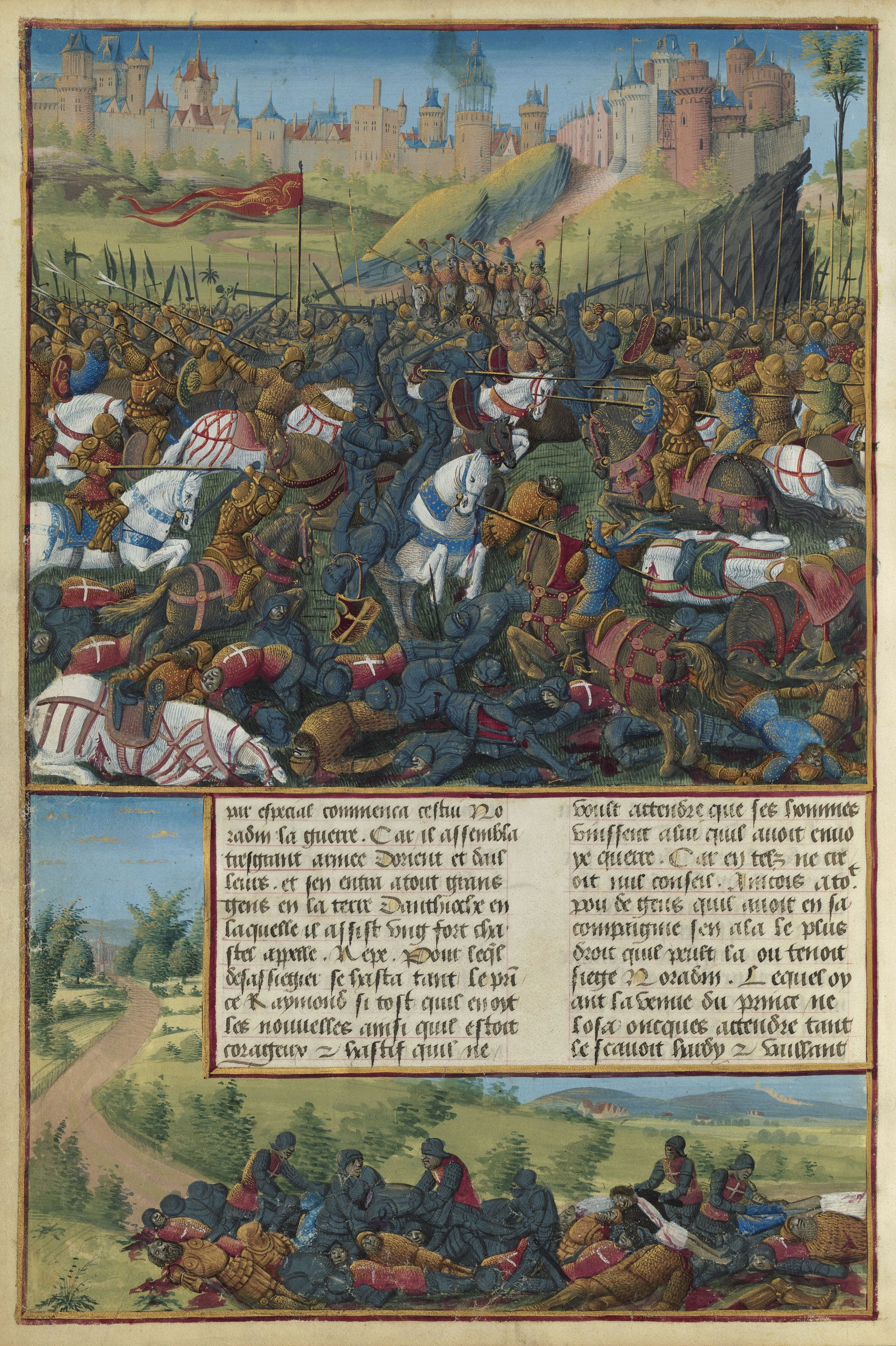
Nur al-Din's victory at the Battle of Inab, 1149 (illustration from the Passages d'outremer, c. 1490)

Muslim forces pressed the northern Crusader states. Raymond of Poitiers was killed at the Battle of Inab on 29 June 1149; Nur al-Din seized Antiochene fortresses and destroyed Tortosa, while the Artuqids and Seljuks of Rum attacked the ruined County of Edessa. Joscelin II of Edessa was captured, and in 1150 his wife Beatrice sold the remnants of his county to Byzantium. Unur's death ended the Aleppo–Damascus alliance, as his successor Abaq allied with the Franks.

In 1151 Assassins murdered Raymond II of Tripoli and his son Raymond III succeeded him. The following year, Baldwin III of Jerusalem deposed his mother Melisende. He captured Ascalon in 1153, completing the conquest of the coast. He arranged the marriage of the French crusader Raynald of Châtillon to Constance of Antioch. Between 1154 and 1157, Nur al-Din blockaded Damascus, forced Abaq to withdraw, and took Shaizar, uniting Muslim Syria. The Franks failed to retake Shaizar despite the support of Thierry of Flanders, a veteran of the Second Crusade. In 1159 Emperor Manuel I invaded Syria, halting Nur al-Din's advance, but Raynald was captured by Turkomans in 1160/61.

The childless Baldwin III died of illness on 10 February 1163. His brother Amalric's succession was made conditional on the annulment of his marriage to Agnes of Courtenay. Their children, Sibylla and Baldwin, nevertheless were recognised as legitimate. In Antioch, Bohemond III, son of Constance and Raymond of Poitiers, took power and expelled his mother.

Under Amalric, the wealthy but divided Egypt became the main battleground with Nur al-Din. Between 1163 and 1169, Amalric launched five campaigns, but Nur al-Din's forces blocked his conquest. In early 1169, the Fatimid caliph al-Adid appointed Nur al-Din's Kurdish general Shirkuh as vizier; on his death, his nephew Saladin succeeded him. Amalric renewed the Byzantine alliance, but their joint invasion of Egypt failed. In September 1171, Saladin abolished the Fatimid caliphate, but soon quarrelled with Nur al-Din. In response to Amalric's appeals, Louis VII of France imposed a levy—one penny on every pound of property and income—for the Holy Land over five years. His initiative was soon matched by Henry II of England.

In 1174, Nur al-Din and Amalric both died, leaving underage heirs: as-Salih and the leper Baldwin IV. In his final years, Nur al-Din had made the conquest of Jerusalem the chief aim of jihad, inspiring a new Muslim literary genre, the Merits of Jerusalem. The struggle for his legacy was won by Saladin, who took Damascus in 1174, Aleppo in 1183, and compelled the Zengid ruler of Mosul, Izz al-Din, to submit in 1186. As early as 1176, the Abbasid caliph al-Mustadi urged Saladin to renew the jihad against the Franks, but he instead fought his Muslim rivals. Once he secured much of the Near East, however, he needed a new target to furnish his troops with plunder.

Jerusalem's leaders sought Western support by marrying Baldwin's heir Sibylla to William of Montferrat, a kinsman of German and French royalty, but he died in 1177. That year Philip I of Flanders led a futile armed pilgrimage to the Holy Land, and a Byzantine–Frankish invasion of Egypt failed amid disputes over its future. Before his death Baldwin designated Sibylla's posthumous son by William, Baldwin V his successor. On the child's death in 1186, Sibylla and her second husband Guy of Lusignan seized power with the support of leading figures, including Raynald of Châtillon, by then lord of Transjordan. Their rival, Raymond III, allied with Saladin, granting his troops free passage through Galilee.

== Fall and recovery ==
Disillusioned by the failure of the Second Crusade, Western rulers were unwilling to launch another expedition to the Holy Land, despite the threat from Saladin. Criticism of crusading intensified, recorded in the 1187 Military Affairs by the historian Ralph Niger, who questioned the efficacy of crusading indulgences without corresponding spiritual renewal. In this climate only a major defeat in the East could revive crusading zeal. The Byzantine Empire, a traditional ally of Jerusalem, was destabilised by coups in 1183 and 1185, while the massacre of Italian merchants deepened its isolation from the West. In 1185 Emperor Isaac II Angelos concluded an anti-Seljuk alliance with Saladin, recognising his claim to Syria except Antioch.

=== Third Crusade ===
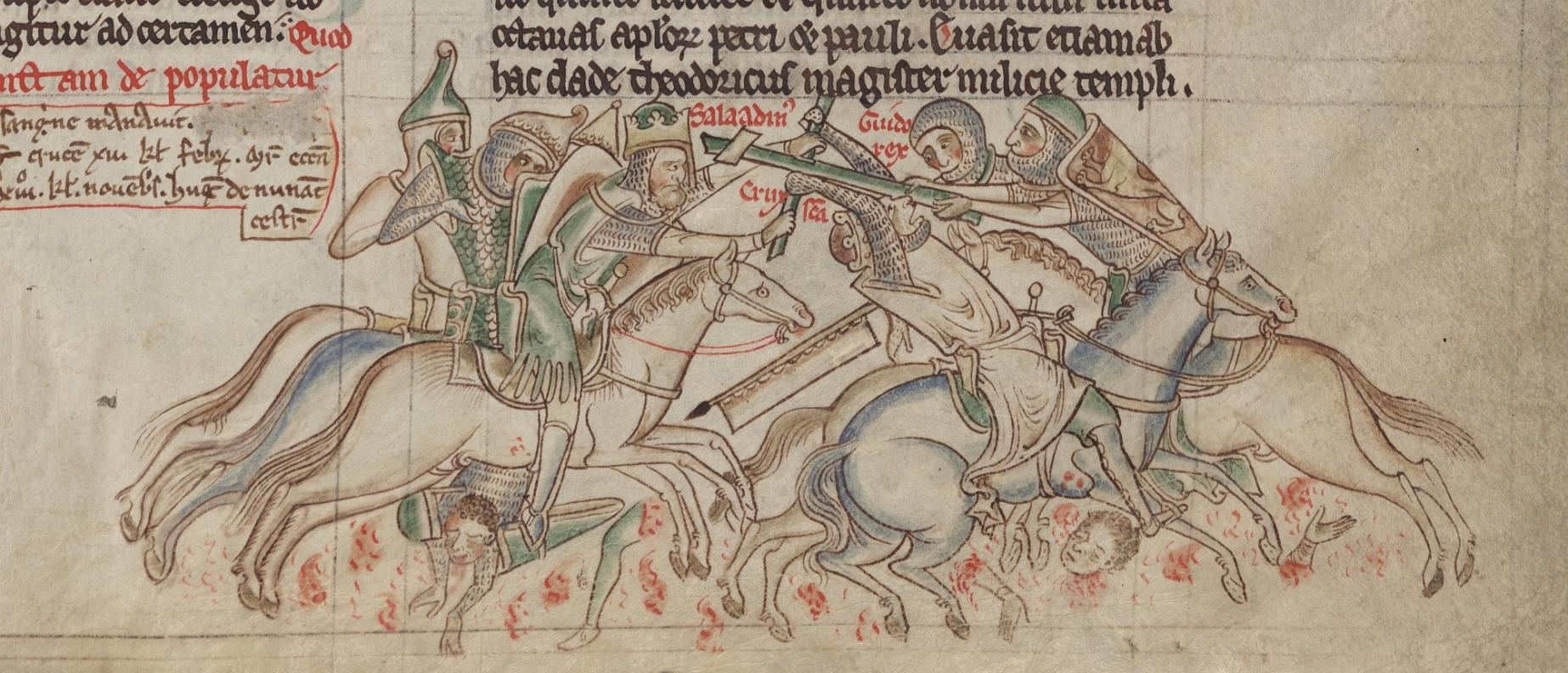
Muslim warriors seize the True Cross at the Battle of Hattin (from a manuscript of Matthew of Paris's Chronica maiora)

Despite a truce signed in 1185 still in force, Raynald of Châtillon attacked a Muslim caravan in Transjordan in early 1187, prompting Saladin to muster troops across his empire. Guy of Jerusalem and Raymond III of Tripoli were reconciled, but the Jerusalemite field army, exhausted by a long march, was crushed at the Battle of Hattin on 4 July 1187. Raymond fled while others were killed or captured. Saladin executed Raynald, the Templars and Hospitallers, but spared other leaders including Guy. The kingdom lay defenceless—after a 12-day siege the city of Jerusalem surrendered to Saladin on 2 October. Tyre resisted under the newly arrived crusader Conrad of Montferrat, who sent Archbishop Joscius west for aid. Saladin's siege of Tyre was lifted on 1 January 1188. The first reports of the disaster reached Italy through Genoese merchants. William II of Sicily dispatched c. 50 ships and 200 knights, and his fleet's support strengthened the defence of Antioch, Tripoli, and Tyre. Raymond III died of illness, and the County of Tripoli was seized by Bohemond IV, son of Bohemond III of Antioch.

Pope Gregory VIII launched the new crusade with the bull Audita tremendi on 29 October 1187. The English prince Richard was the first to take the cross. Pope Gregory appointed Joscius of Tyre to preach in France and Henry of Albano in Germany. On 22 January 1189 Joscius reconciled Philip II of France and Henry II of England at Gisors, where both kings and many nobles took the cross. Troubadours such as Conon of Béthune also spread the message of the bull. To fund the crusade, the "Saladin tithe"—a levy of 10% on income and movable goods—was imposed in England and France. On 27 March 1188 Emperor Frederick I swore his oath at the Curia Christi ('Court of Christ') in Mainz. The English, French, and part of the German host chose the sea route, but Frederick resolved to march overland.

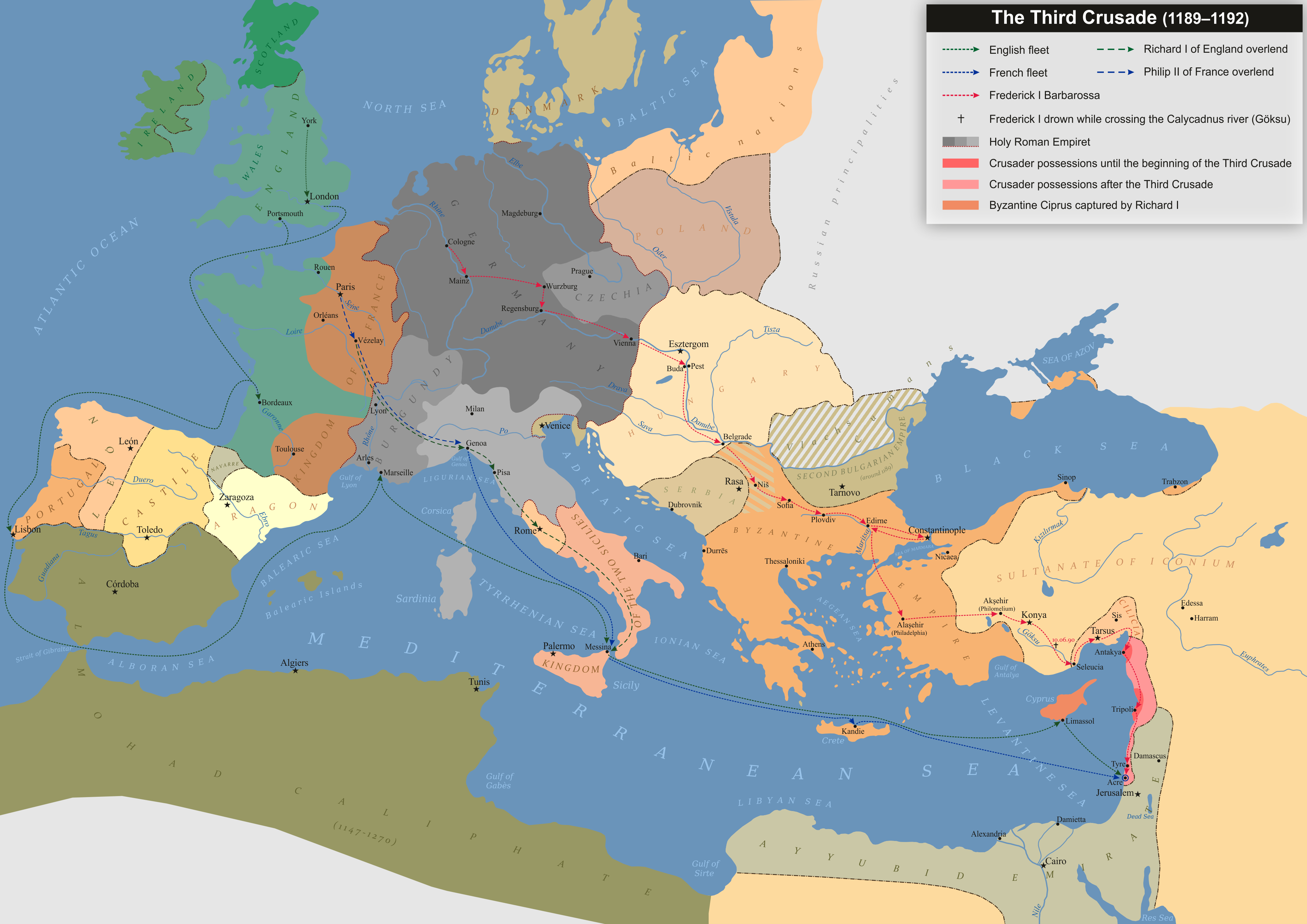
Map of the Third Crusade

Frederick set out in May 1189 with c. 15,000 troops. By then Frankish control was reduced to Tyre, Antioch, Tripoli, and the fortresses of Beaufort, Margat, and Krak des Chevaliers. Saladin had freed Guy in May 1188, but Conrad barred him from Tyre. Gathering c. 9,000 men, Guy laid siege to Acre in August 1189 with Pisan naval support, his army reinforced by arriving western contingents. Fearing a German–Seljuk alliance, Emperor Isaac II denied Frederick safe passage. Frederick retaliated by attacking Byzantine towns, forcing Isaac in March 1190 to allow transport into Anatolia on Genoese and Pisan ships. Despite Turkoman raids and scarce supplies, the Germans briefly took Konya, capital of Rum, but the crusade collapsed when Frederick drowned in the river Saleph on 10 June 1190. His son Frederick of Swabia failed to sustain morale: many deserted or died, and only remnants reached Acre in October.

Franco-English tensions persisted until Henry II's death in July 1189. Richard I succeeded and swiftly prepared for the crusade, raising further funds by exacting a taillage from the Jews. He met with Philip II at Vézelay on 4 July 1190 before departing. Richard's host numbered c. 17,000, while the French force was smaller, as many had already left under Henry II of Champagne. Richard hired ships in Marseille, Philip in Genoa, and both sailed to Sicily. There Richard seized Messina, compelling the new Sicilian king Tancred of Lecce to pay a substantial sum. From Sicily the French sailed directly to Acre, arriving on 20 April. A storm drove several English ships onto Cyprus, where the local Byzantine ruler Isaac Komnenos seized the wrecks and captives. Richard conquered the island before reaching Acre on 6 June 1191.

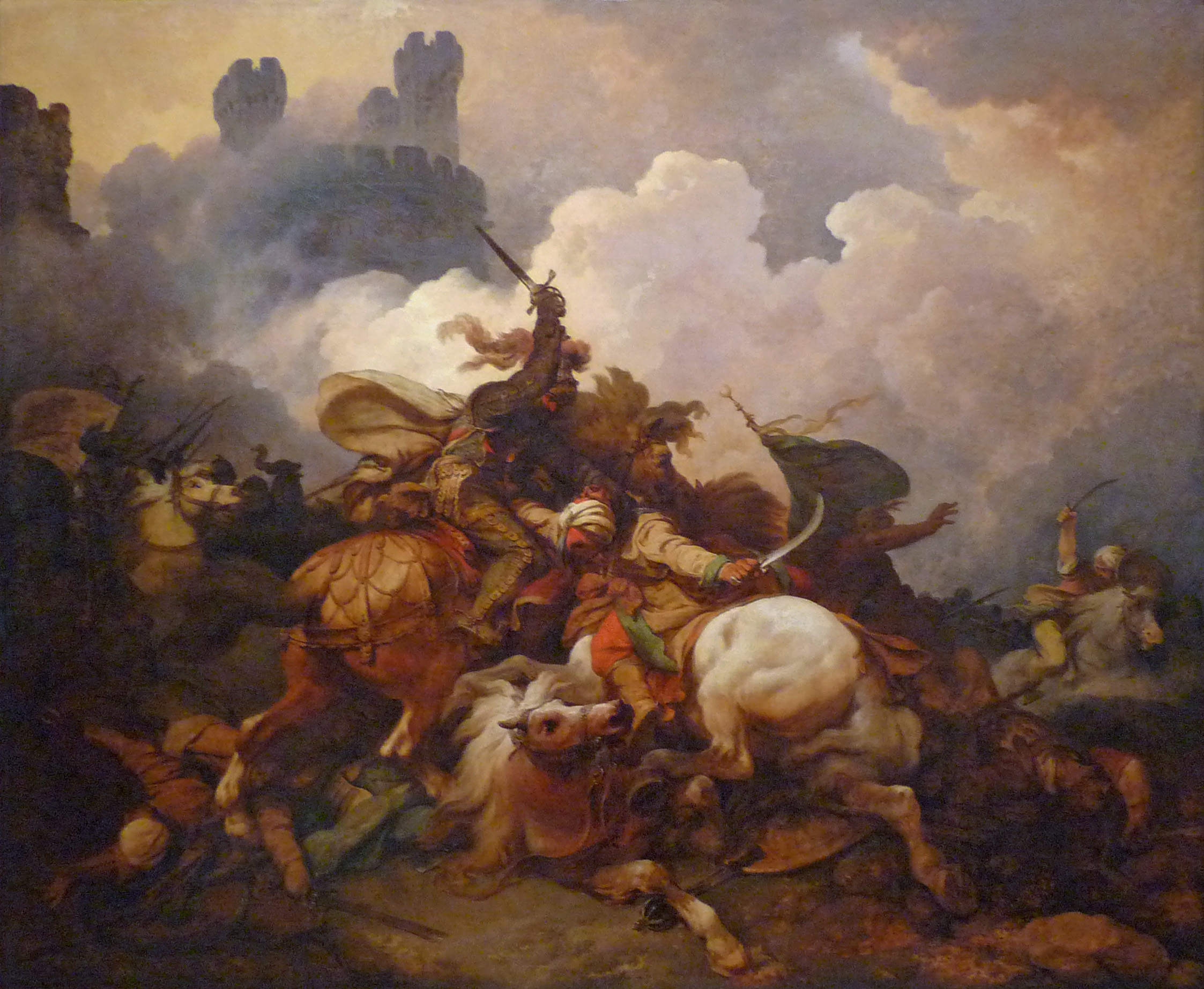
Richard the Lionheart during the siege of Acre, as depicted by Philip James de Loutherbourg (1807)

Meanwhile, the long siege caused a deadly plague at Acre, killing Queen Sibylla. As Guy's kingship relied on her, her death voided his claim. Supported by French and German crusaders and the papal legate Ubaldo of Pisa, Conrad married Sibylla's half-sister Isabella on 24 November 1190. Guy refused to abdicate and sought Richard's backing. The siege intensified with the arrival of two royal armies, and on 12 July 1191 the defenders surrendered without Saladin's approval, under safe-conduct terms. Richard's and Philip's banners rose on Acre's walls, but when Leopold V of Austria raised his flag, Richard tore it down. Stricken by illness, Philip II soon withdrew from the crusade. Acre's surrender required Saladin to free 1,600 Frankish prisoners and return the True Cross within a month; when he failed, Richard ordered 2,700–3,000 Muslim captives executed. From Acre, Richard advanced south, defeated Saladin at the Battle of Arsuf, and secured Jaffa.

News that Richard's brother John was attempting to seize England reached the Holy Land, prompting Richard to plan his return. On 20 April 1192 he recognised Conrad's claim to the remnant Kingdom of Jerusalem and granted Cyprus to Guy as compensation. Conrad was assassinated eight days later, and his pregnant widow Isabella soon married Henry of Champagne, a kinsman of both the French and English kings. In June Richard advanced towards Jerusalem, but the crusaders halted at Bayt Nuba, 13 miles (21 km) away, fearing defeat, and withdrew to the coast. Saladin counterattacked at Jaffa, but Richard relieved the town. Peace talks begun the previous year led to the Treaty of Jaffa on 2 September, a three-year truce confirming Frankish control of the coast between Tyre and Jaffa and allowing Christian pilgrims access to the holy sites of Palestine. Richard left Palestine on 9 October 1192 but was captured in Austria by Leopold V. In 1193 he was handed to Emperor Henry VI, who freed him for a ransom of 100,000 marks.

=== Crusade of 1197 ===
Revival of the Crusader states between 1197 and 1205

Saladin died of illness on 4 March 1193. His empire soon collapsed, as his eldest son and designated heir, al-Afdal, proved unable to restrain the ambitions of his many Ayyubid kinsmen. Of these, Saladin's brother al-Adil was the most astute, securing control of Damascus in 1196.

The Third Crusade, with its heavy naval use, set a model for later expeditions: sea travel limited non-combatants and eased army supply. Though no campaign matched its scale, new plans arose. Emperor Henry VI, after taking the Kingdom of Sicily from Tancred, revived Norman ambitions in the eastern Mediterranean. He took the cross in April 1195, and Pope Celestine III authorised preaching a new crusade in Germany. By then Leo I of Cilician Armenia and Aimery of Lusignan, Guy's successor in Cyprus, had recognised Henry's suzerainty.

Henry planned to recruit 3,000 mercenaries and demanded tribute from the new Byzantine emperor Alexios III Angelos to fund the venture. Alexios levied the heavy Alamanikon ('German tax'), raising over 7,000 pounds of silver, but payment ended when Henry died of illness on 28 September 1197. Earlier, the ailing emperor had named his marshal Henry of Kalden, and the imperial chancellor Bishop Conrad of Hildesheim to lead the crusade. German forces sailed from southern Italian ports between March and September. That same month al-Adil captured Jaffa, but the crusaders took Botrun, Sidon and Beirut before abandoning the campaign when news of Henry's death reached Palestine in February 1198.

During the crusade, Aimery of Cyprus and Leo I of Cilicia Armenia were crowned kings by imperial envoys. After marrying the widowed Isabella I of Jerusalem, Aimery was also crowned king of Jerusalem in January 1198. He soon prolonged the truce with the Ayyubids until 1204. The same year the German nursing confraternity that had run a hospital at Acre since the Third Crusade assumed military functions, forming the Teutonic Knights.

=== Fourth Crusade ===
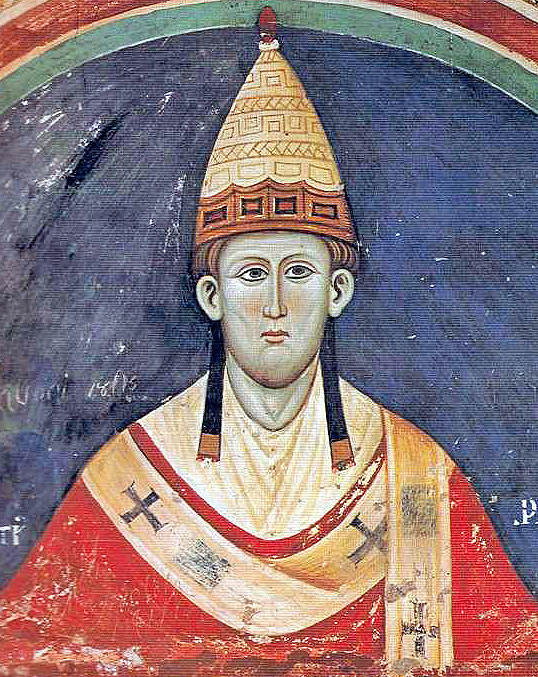
Pope Innocent III: his policies had a major influence on the ideological and institutional framework of crusading (a fresco in St. Benedict's Cave at the Subiaco Abbey, c. 1219).

Pope Celestine III died in 1198 and was succeeded by Innocent III, a learned theologian and jurist. That year he proclaimed a new crusade, but the Anglo–French war and the German throne dispute between Philip of Swabia and Otto of Brunswick blocked any large-scale campaign. Markward von Annweiler, a veteran of the Third Crusade, rejected Innocent's claim to act as regent in Sicily for the child Frederick, son of Emperor Henry VI. Innocent accused him of endangering the Holy Land and extended crusading indulgence to those fighting him, though only Walter of Brienne, a French claimant to southern Italian fiefs, joined this first "political crusade".

Innocent pressed on with plans for a crusade to the Holy Land. He sent his legate Peter Capuano to mediate peace between England and France, but talks ended when Richard I died in April 1199. By then Innocent had tasked the preacher Fulk of Neuilly with promoting the crusade in France. To fund it, he imposed a 2.5% extraordinary levy on clerical income. Theobald III of Champagne was the first to take the cross on 28 November, followed by his cousin Louis of Blois and, in February 1200, his brother-in-law Baldwin IX of Flanders. They secretly agreed to strike Egypt first, concealing the plan to avoid rank-and-file opposition. Six envoys, including Geoffrey of Villehardouin—later the crusade's chronicler—were appointed to hire a fleet. They agreed with Doge Enrico Dandolo that Venice would build, by June 1202, a fleet for 33,500 crusaders for 85,000 marks (over 20 tons of silver). After Theobald's unexpected death in May 1201, Boniface of Montferrat, linked to royal houses in East and West, became leader.

The crusade faltered when only a third of the expected force gathered at Venice; many embarked elsewhere or failed to keep their vows. The Venetians had invested heavily but the crusaders could not pay the agreed sum. To recover losses, Dandolo proposed attacking Zara, a Christian city in Dalmatia under King Emeric of Hungary, himself a sworn crusader. Despite papal prohibition and protests from some, including Simon de Montfort, the leaders agreed and captured Zara for Venice in November 1202.

While wintering there, Alexios Angelos, son of the deposed Emperor Isaac II, offered to reunite the Byzantine Church with Rome, pay 200,000 marks, and supply 10,000 troops if restored to Constantinople. Though only recently absolved for attacking a Christian city, the leaders accepted and diverted the expedition, prompting several hundred dissenters to quit or sail directly to the Holy Land. The army reached Constantinople in June 1203 and began the siege. Their first assault in July forced Emperor Alexios III to flee; Isaac II was restored and his son crowned co-emperor as Alexios IV. Alexios raised only 100,000 marks and promised more if the crusaders stayed until March, which a parlament, attended by both commanders and knights, accepted. As he failed to pay, the crusaders began plundering. Losing support, Alexios IV and Isaac were deposed by the aristocrat Alexios Doukas, crowned Alexios V in February 1204.

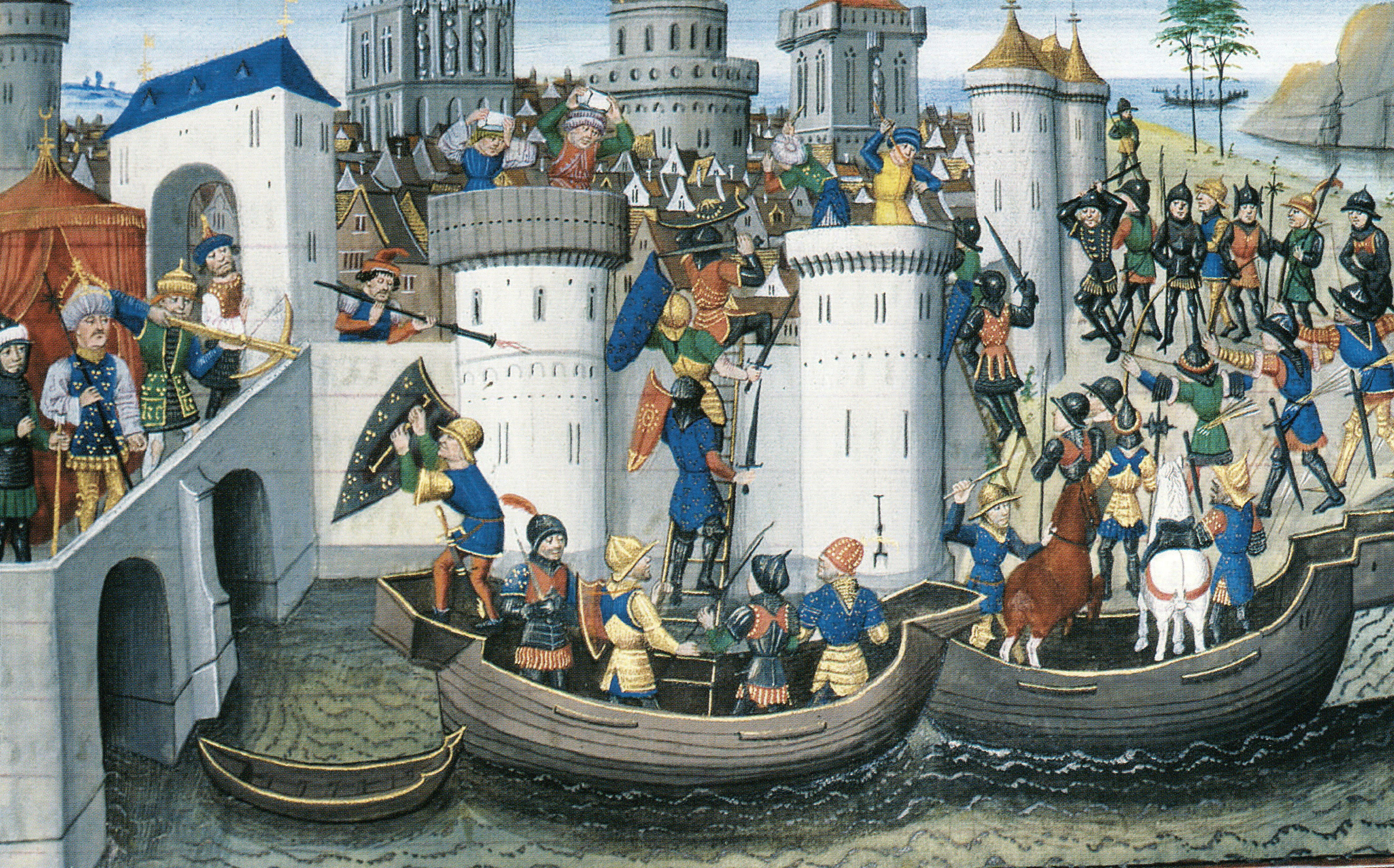
Conquest of Constantinople (from a 15th-century manuscript illuminated by David Aubert)

Lacking supplies, the crusader leaders resolved to attack Constantinople after agreeing on how to divide its spoils and partition the empire. Their first assault failed, but clergy kept morale with sermons branding the Byzantines schismatics "worse than the Jews". The second attack, on 12 April, succeeded and the Sack of Constantinople lasted for days. The crusaders massacred thousands, desecrated holy sites and seized the city's movable wealth. Relics were taken in great numbers to Western churches. The brutality shocked contemporaries, including the Pope and the Muslim scholar Ibn al-Athir. The Byzantine historian Nicetas Choniates contrasted Saladin's clemency in Jerusalem with the crusaders' slaughter of Orthodox Christians in Constantinople.

A committee of six Venetian and six French crusaders elected Baldwin of Flanders as the first Latin Emperor. Boniface of Montferrat received Macedonia and Thessaly, founding the Kingdom of Thessalonica; his vassals created the Duchy of Athens in Attica and the Principality of Achaea in the Peloponnese. Venice gained many Aegean islands, including Crete, and thereafter a Venetian cleric was appointed as Latin Patriarch of Constantinople. Frankish control of former Byzantine lands proved precarious. Baldwin died in Bulgarian captivity after defeat at the Battle of Adrianople in 1205, and Boniface was killed fighting Bulgarians in 1207. Greek resistance centred on three Byzantine successor states: Epirus, Nicaea, and Trebizond. From the Crusader states' view, the Fourth Crusade was almost a failure: only about a fifth of those who took the cross around 1200 reached the Holy Land—enabling Aimery of Jerusalem to extend the 1198 truce for six years in 1204—while most participants in Constantinople's sack returned home without going east.

=== Towards a new Levantine crusade ===
After the Fourth Crusade's collapse, Pope Innocent III considered a new eastern campaign. Yet large-scale plans had little chance amid the prolonged German throne dispute and renewed war between France and England. The Crusader states faced no immediate danger because of divisions within the Ayyubids. In 1212 John of Brienne, the new king of Jerusalem, concluded a five-year truce with al-Adil, by then ruler of Egypt and Damascus, and soon asked Innocent to call a crusade once it expired. John had gained the throne by marrying Queen Isabella's daughter and heir, Maria of Montferrat; after his wife's death, he reigned with their infant daughter, Isabella II.

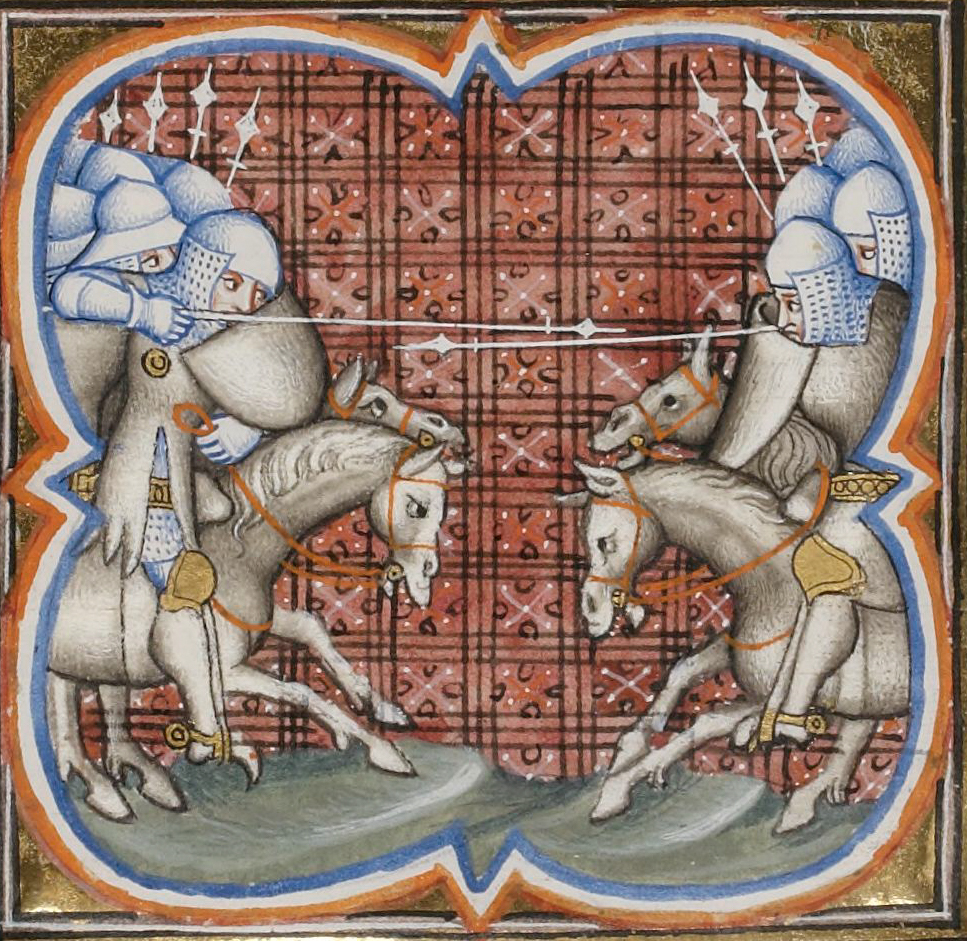
The Battle of Muret, a key engagement of the Albigensian Crusades (a miniature from the late 14th-century Grandes Chroniques de France)

The medievalist Andrew Jotischky sees Innocent's crusade policy as "pragmatic reactions to problems". One challenge was Catharism, a dualist religious movement in southern France. He launched the Albigensian Crusade against them in 1208, denouncing the Cathars as "more evil" than Muslims.

Popular zeal for crusading persisted, though recent failures drew criticism of noble-led campaigns and expeditions. Petition processions for Iberian Christians resisting the Muslim revivalist Almohads and preaching against the Cathars stirred fervour in central France and the Rhineland in the early 1210s. In 1212 this produced popular movements later called the "Children's Crusade". Sources conflict and mix myth with moral tales, but agree the participants were children and youths seeking to retake Jerusalem, but none reached the Holy Land.

=== Fifth Crusade ===
Unlike in the Levant, crusading in Europe was succeeding. In Iberia the Reconquista struck a decisive blow to the Almohads at the Battle of Las Navas de Tolosa in July 1212. That year Simon de Montfort, now leader of the Albigensian Crusade, completed the conquest of much of southern France. These victories, with the spontaneous zeal of the Children's Crusade, let Pope Innocent III plan a new Levantine crusade. He proclaimed it in the bull Quia maior, citing a new Muslim fort on Mount Tabor as pretext. According to Madden, this "impressive document represents the full maturation of the crusading idea". The Fourth Crusade had shown the ruinous effect of poor organisation, and Innocent concluded only papal direction could ensure success. He also broke with the tradition of appealing solely to the military class and granted full indulgence to those who funded a warrior's journey if unable to go themselves, and partial indulgence to donors.

The expedition's terms were set at the Fourth Lateran Council in November 1215. Crusaders were to gather at Brindisi or Messina in southern Italy by 1 June 1217, when the 1212 truce ended. A 5% levy on clerical income across Europe for three years was imposed, and Innocent pledged 30,000 pounds of silver. The appeal failed in France, preoccupied with the Albigensian Crusade, but found support elsewhere. Andrew II of Hungary and Leopold VI of Austria took the cross. Frederick II, Innocent's protégé in the German throne dispute, also vowed to join though had not yet defeated Otto of Brunswick Oliver of Paderborn, a crusade preacher, toured the Low Countries recounting visions such as three crosses in the sky, while Jacques de Vitry won over Genoese patricians through their wives. During preparations Innocent died on 16 July 1216, but his successor, Honorius III, carried on his policy. For the first time in crusading history, the crusade was also preached in the Crusader states and in Cyprus.

Hungarian and Austrian crusaders embarked at the Dalmatian port of Spalato on Venetian ships rather than the more distant southern Italian harbours. By late September they reached Acre, where John of Brienne, Hugh I of Cyprus, and Bohemond IV of Antioch joined them. After a failed siege of Mount Tabor, Andrew II deemed his vow fulfilled and, with most Hungarians, withdrew. Frisian, German, and Italian forces then joined, and in May 1218 the army advanced on Damietta, a thriving Nile Delta port. The city's subsequent siege saw a shifting host as Western contingents arrived and others departed. John of Brienne was chosen commander but soon challenged by the papal legate Pelagius.

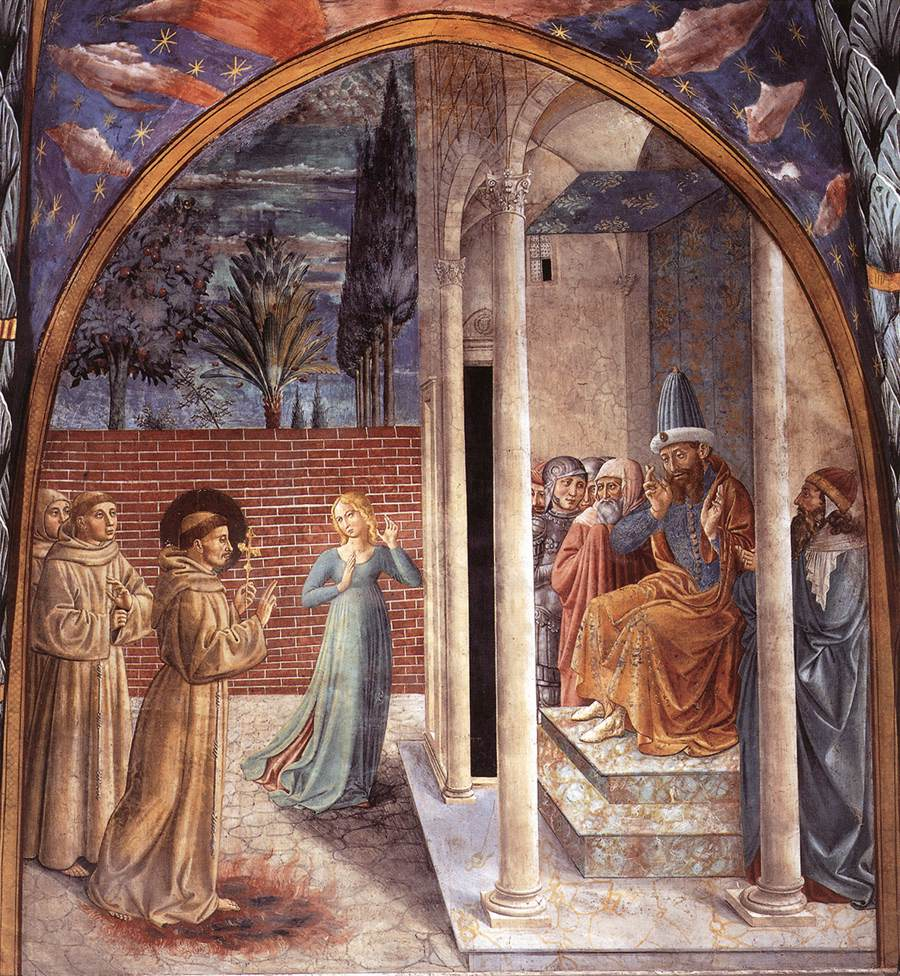
Francis of Assisi before Sultan al-Kamil during the Fifth Crusade (a 15th-century fresco by Benozzo Gozzoli)

In late August the crusaders seized the Tower of the Chain, guarding the Delta. Al-Adil reportedly died of shock; his son al-Kamil offered to restore the pre-1187 borders of the Kingdom of Jerusalem (excluding Transjordan) for withdrawal. On learning of the offer, al-Kamil's brother al-Mu'azzam dismantled Jerusalem's walls, but the crusaders rejected the offer as the kingdom was indefensible without the fortresses over the Jordan. In August 1219, the mystic Francis of Assisi met al-Kamil, seeking to convert him to Christianity unsuccessfully. Prophecies promised victory and aid from the mythical Prester John, fuelled by distorted reports of the Mongol conquests in Central Asia.

Damietta fell to the crusaders in November 1219, but its possession soon sparked renewed conflict between John of Brienne and Pelagius. A year later Frederick reaffirmed his crusading vow at his imperial coronation in Rome. The first German forces arrived under Louis I of Bavaria in 1221. That July, ignoring Frederick's orders, Louis and Pelagius advanced towards Cairo, but al-Kamil, aided by his brothers al-Muʿazzam and al-Ashraf, forced a northward retreat. With the Nile in flood, he opened the sluices, flooding their route. Trapped, the crusaders accepted terms: Damietta was surrendered for safe conduct and an eight-year truce. Al-Kamil re-entered the city in September as the crusaders withdrew. The sudden collapse shocked Western Christendom. Many blamed Pelagius for the disastrous final campaign, while others—including returning crusaders and Honorius—condemned Frederick for failing to honour his vow.

=== Sixth Crusade ===
By 1218 Frederick II had secured his authority in Germany, but the union of Sicily with the Holy Roman Empire under his rule threatened the papacy. Yet, relations with Pope Honorius III stayed cordial, aided by mediators such as Hermann of Salza, Grand Master of the Teutonic Knights, and Thomas of Capua, head of the papal penitentiary. Frederick renewed his crusading vow in May 1223, setting June 1225 for departure, and agreed to marry Isabella II of Jerusalem in the presence of her father, John of Brienne. With little response to the crusade call, he renewed the vow again in March 1225, pledging under threat of excommunication to depart in August 1227. In November 1225 he married Isabella and exacted oaths of fealty from the barons of the Kingdom of Jerusalem despite earlier assurances that he would allow John to rule.

In 1226 tensions between al-Kamil and al-Mu'azzam grew so severe that al-Kamil sent an envoy to Frederick, offering Jerusalem's return to the Christians for aid against his rival. In March 1227 Pope Honorius died and the energetic Gregory IX succeeded him. He soon clashed with Frederick over papal rights in Sicily, though preparations for the crusade continued. To win Lombard support Frederick used force, yet many eagerly joined, including the German noble Louis IV of Thuringia, the Italian aristocrat Thomas of Acerra, and the English bishop Peter des Roches. Several crusaders sailed from Brindisi on 15 August 1227. Frederick followed on 8 September with c. 800 knights and 10,000 infantry but fell ill and returned to southern Italy. Enraged, Pope Gregory excommunicated him before the end of the month. Learning of Frederick's illness and excommunication, many crusaders in the Holy Land abandoned the campaign; the rest repaired coastal fortifications. They also seized Sidon and built Montfort Castle near Acre after al-Mu'azzam died in November 1227.

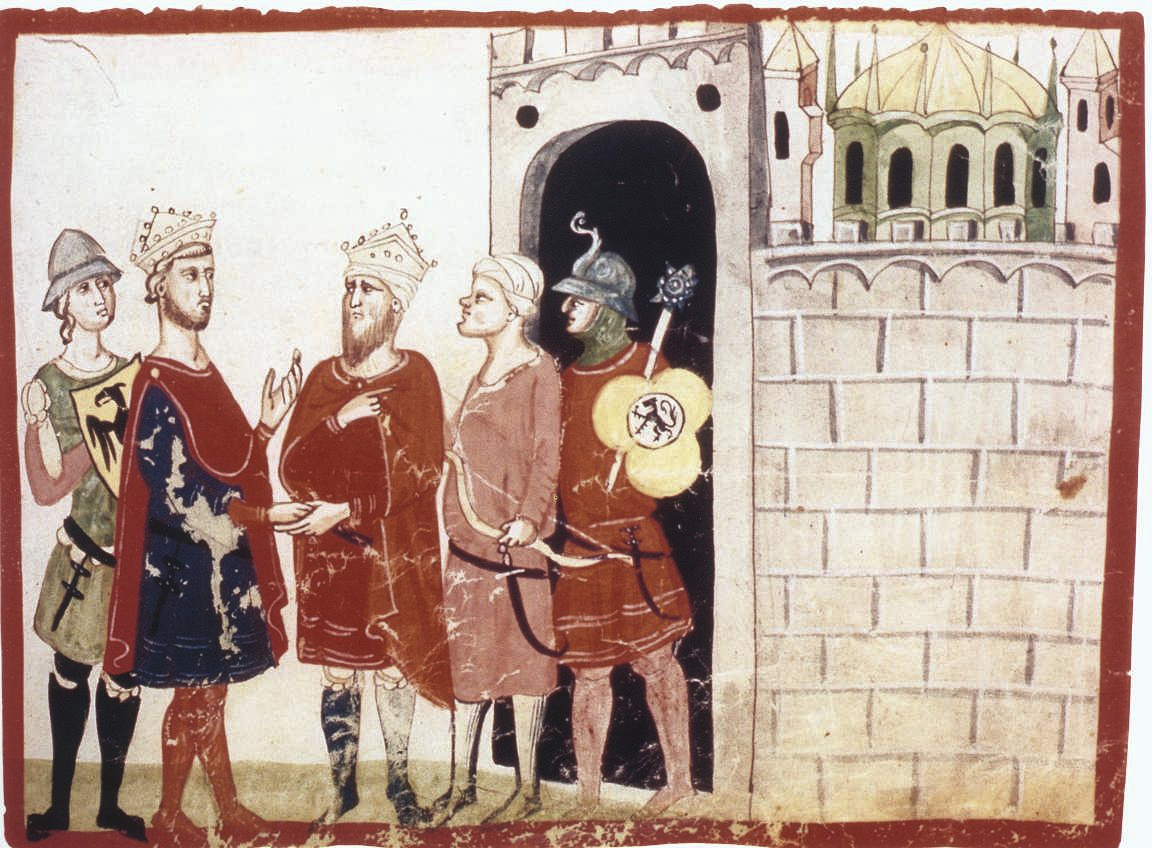
Holy Roman Emperor Frederick II (left) meets al-Kamil (right) (14th-century illumination from Giovanni Villani's Nuova Cronica).

Disregarding papal demands to seek absolution before resuming the crusade, Frederick resolved to lead an expedition to the Holy Land. As Isabella died shortly after giving birth to their son, Conrad, he departed only in late June 1228. Reaching Cyprus, an imperial fief, he deposed John of Ibelin, regent for the underage King Henry I, and demanded fealty from Bohemond IV of Antioch and Tripoli, who refused. Frederick landed at Acre on 7 September. As the Hospitallers, the Templars, and devout crusaders would not follow an excommunicated leader, he used intermediaries to issue orders. He renewed talks with al-Kamil, displaying tolerance toward Islam and notable learning. On 18 February 1229 the Treaty of Jaffa ceded Jerusalem, Bethlehem, and other key cities to the Christians, while preserving the Temple Mount, the Dome of the Rock, and the al-Aqsa Mosque as Muslim places of worship; it also established a ten-year truce, excluding Antioch, Tripoli, and the Hospitaller and Templar lands. Though gaining more than any earlier crusade, the treaty drew sharp criticism. Visiting Jerusalem, Frederick entered Muslim shrines and on 18 May crowned himself king in the Church of the Holy Sepulchre.

Meanwhile, with papal backing, John of Brienne invaded southern Italy, compelling Frederick to abandon his eastern campaign in May. He landed at Brindisi in June and, by the end of October, had driven his former father-in-law back into papal territory.

=== Barons' Crusade ===
By Emperor Frederick II's return from his eastern campaign, the Treaty of Paris had ended the Albigensian Crusades on 12 April 1229. The period also saw crusader successes in Iberia: James I of Aragon conquered the Balearic Islands and Valencia by 1238, while Ferdinand III of Castile took Córdoba in 1236 after a successful siege. In the Baltic, the Teutonic Knights assumed command of the crusade against the pagan Prussians in 1230. Pope Gregory IX meanwhile launched the Drenther and Stedinger Crusades against peasant rebels and the Bosnian Crusade against dissident Christians.

Frederick reconciled with the papacy in May 1230. The following year Frederick appointed Richard Filangieri as bailli (deputy) in the Kingdom of Jerusalem. Supported by the Teutonic Knights, Pisans, and some local nobles, Filangieri seized Tyre, but most Jerusalemite barons, led by John of Ibelin and backed by the Genoese and Henry I of Cyprus, resisted. Upon John's death in 1236, his son Balian of Beirut assumed command of the resistance.

Pope Gregory called for a new crusade in separate encyclicals to the English and French in 1234. The expedition was to depart for the Holy Land when the 1229 truce expired in 1239. He ordered taxation of clerical income and promoted commuting crusading vows for cash. He also proposed the establishment of a garrison in Palestine, to be maintained for ten years and financed by lay contributions in return for partial crusade indulgences. Mendicant friars preached the crusade, but bishops held the funds, which were distributed by papal authorisation to aristocrats who had taken the cross. In France, Theobald IV of Champagne (also king of Navarre), Hugh IV of Burgundy, and Peter of Dreux were among the nobles who joined. Most had earlier rebelled against Blanche of Castile, regent for King Louis IX of France, and by taking the cross gained church protection. Louis aided them with gifts, loans, and authorised them to fight under the royal banner. In England, several nobles hostile to royal authority enlisted, including Richard of Cornwall—one of Europe's wealthiest men—and his brother-in-law Gilbert Marshal; the army also attracted former enemies such as Simon de Montfort and Richard Siward.

In the late 1230s the Crusader states faced little threat from their Muslim neighbours. After al-Kamil's death in 1238, a two-year struggle followed before his son Ayyub secured Egypt. He recruited new mamluk troops, stationed on a Nile island, forming the Bahri ("river") mamluks. By contrast, the Latin Empire came under pressure from a Bulgarian–Nicaean alliance. Pope Gregory tried to divert crusaders to Constantinople, but only a few—among them Humbert V de Beaujeu and Thomas of Marle—agreed. By their arrival in 1239, the anti-Latin coalition had collapsed, and the crusaders mounted only minor raids in Thrace.

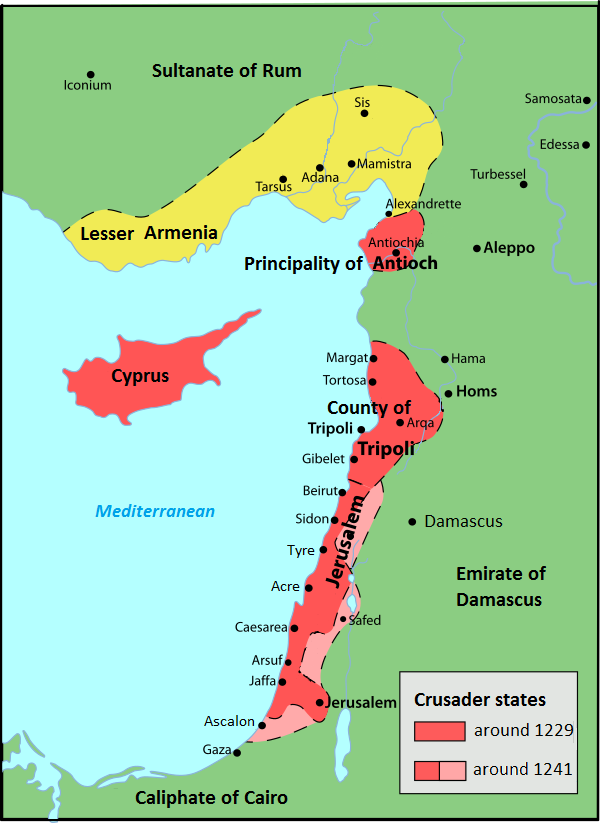
The Crusader states and their neighbours (c. 1241)

The French crusaders offered command to Frederick II, who promised that he or his son Conrad would join. Yet his bid to assert power in Lombardy led to renewed conflict with Pope Gregory, who excommunicated him in March 1239. The French reached Acre that September. Leadership was divided, and in November an Egyptian force routed a contingent at the Battle of Gaza. The defeat emboldened Dawud, Ayyubid emir of Damascus, to sack Jerusalem and dismantle its walls. The divided Ayyubids failed to exploit success; Ismail of Damascus, Ayyub's uncle, even offered to cede Beaufort, Tiberias, and Saphet, then held by Dawud. It is unclear if the offer was accepted, as Theobald of Champagne and Peter of Dreux abandoned the crusade after a pilgrimage to Jerusalem in September 1241.

The English force, c. 600–800 knights and additional troops, arrived in October 1240. Richard of Cornwall, Frederick II's brother-in-law, sided with the pro-imperialist faction in Jerusalem, favouring alliance with Egypt over Damascus. Ayyub, via his ally Dawud, offered to restore Jerusalem to the Franks and release the prisoners taken at Gaza. Richard accepted the proposal, which also upheld Ismail's earlier concessions, expanding the kingdom to its widest extent since 1187. With the agreement secured, the crusade ended in May 1241.

== Fall of the Crusader states ==
The final phase of the Levantine Crusades was marked by Mongol intervention in Middle Eastern politics and the restoration of Muslim unity. Earlier, the Mongols had invaded Hungary and Poland, prompting Pope Gregory IX in June 1241 to call for a crusade against them, but the German host soon dispersed. The invasion ended unexpectedly later that year when the Great Khan, Ögödei, died, compelling the Mongols to withdraw.

=== Seventh Crusade ===
In his letters, Emperor Frederick II portrayed Richard of Cornwall as acting on his behalf in concluding the treaty with Ayyub. In 1242 the Templars, Frederick's foes, plundered Nablus in defiance of the treaty, provoking an Egyptian counterattack. The following year Frederick's son, Conrad—the absent king of Jerusalem—came of age, ending his father's claim to the regency. The barons appointed Conrad's heir presumptive, Alice of Champagne, as regent and seized Tyre, seat of Frederick's lieutenant, Filangieri. This break with Frederick gave Ayyub a pretext to reject papal proposals to renew the truce of 1229.

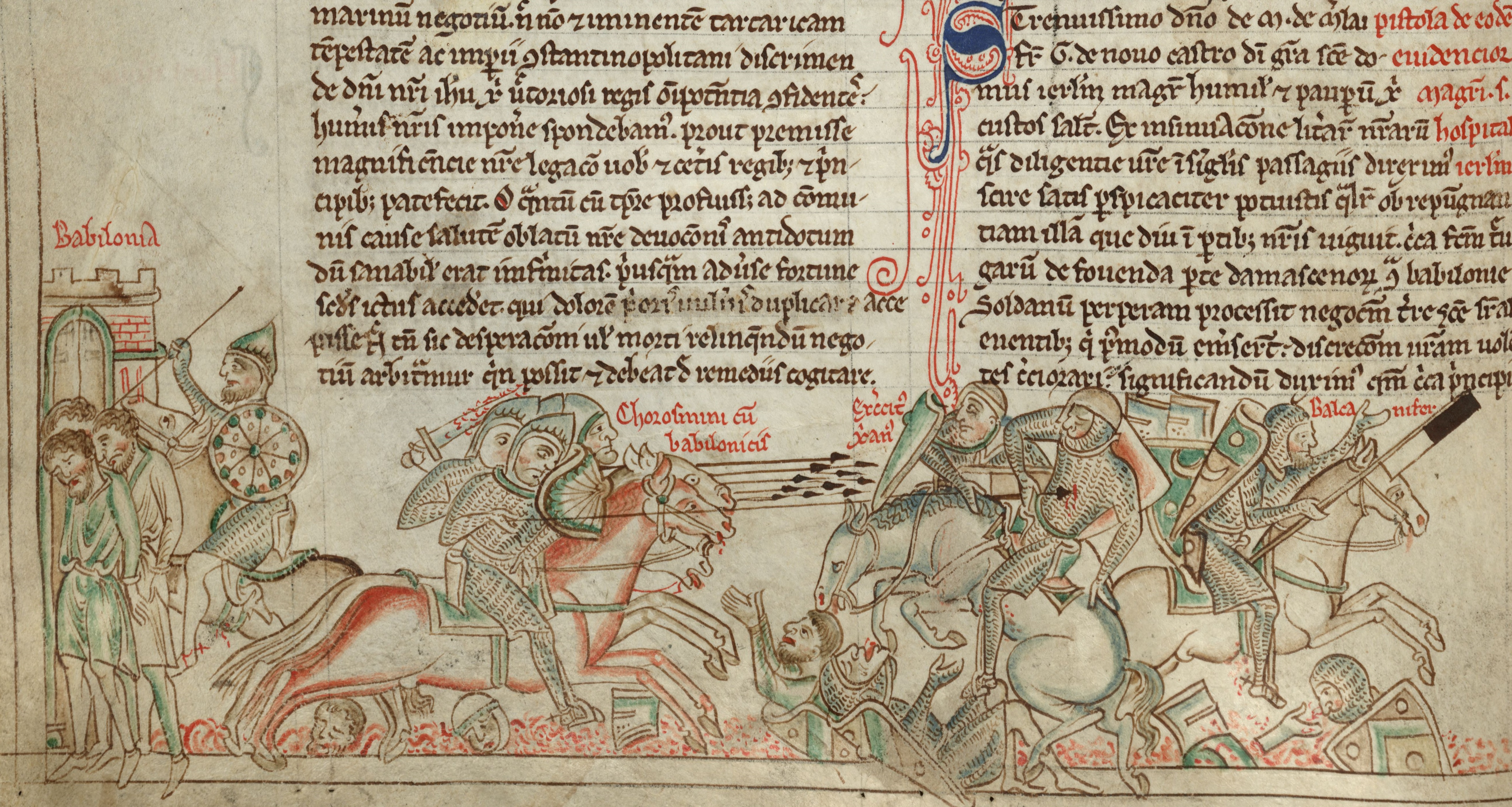
Battle of La Forbie (1244) (form a 13th-century manuscript of the Chronica maiora by Matthew Paris)

The Mongols secured their position in Middle Eastern politics by defeating Kaykhusraw II, Sultan of Rum, at the Battle of Köse Dağ in June 1243. The Seljuks of Rum, the Ayyubids of Aleppo, and the Cilician Armenians soon accepted Mongol suzerainty, while Bohemond V of Antioch refused and warned Emperor Frederick and the newly elected Pope Innocent IV of the growing threat. Meanwhile, Ayyub of Egypt allied with fugitive Khwarazmian soldiers who had settled in Anatolia and Iraq. His rival, Ismail of Damascus, aligned with the Franks and sent forces to Gaza, prompting some 10,000 Khwarazmian horsemen to join Ayyub. Advancing south, they massacred thousands of Christians and sacked Jerusalem in July 1244. Shortly after, they joined the Egyptian army and crushed the Damascene–Frankish force at the Battle of La Forbie on 17 October. Thousands of Frankish troops were killed, leaving the kingdom virtually defenceless.

Reports of Jerusalem's sack had scarcely reached Europe when Louis IX of France took the cross in December 1244. Recently recovered from severe illness, he was, according to contemporary accounts, inspired by a visionary experience to make the vow. Within two months Pope Innocent issued a new crusading bull and tasked Cardinal Odo of Châteauroux with preaching the crusade in France. Promising spiritual rewards, Odo urged the nobility to emulate the heroism of their forebears in the First and Third Crusades. Among the earliest to take the cross were Louis's brothers Robert I of Artois, Alphonse of Poitiers, and Charles I of Anjou. Elsewhere in Europe support was weaker: Henry III of England, recently defeated by Louis, barred Bishop Galeran of Beirut from preaching in his realm, while Haakon IV of Norway declined Louis's invitation despite having earlier taken the cross.

Exiled in Lyon following his conflict with Emperor Frederick, Pope Innocent convened the First Council of Lyon in summer 1245 to plan a new crusade and address the state of the Latin Empire and the Mongol threat. Funds came from indulgence sales, donations, and a clerical tax; Louis added royal taxes and enforced Jewish contributions, totalling over 1,500,000 livres tournois in official accounts. At the council Frederick was deposed, but Louis forbade preaching a crusade against him in France. Meanwhile, war in the Levant continued: Ayyub expelled Ismail from Damascus in late 1245 and seized Galilee from the Franks in 1246. That year Alice died and was succeeded as regent by her son Henry I of Cyprus.

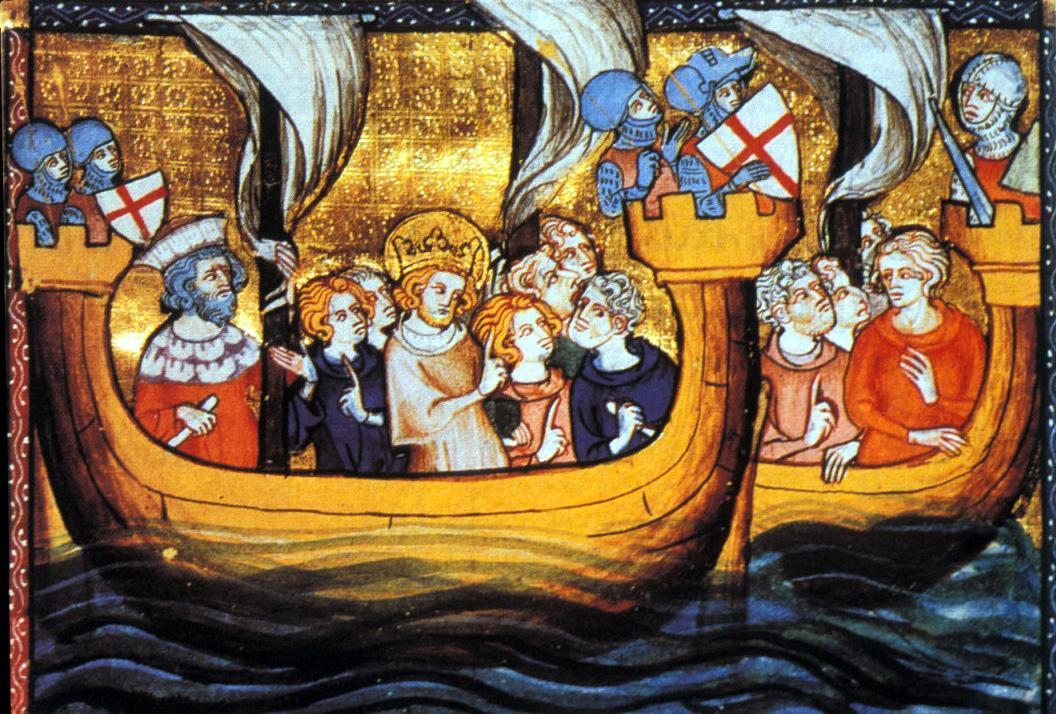
Louis IX of France sails from Aigues-Mortes for the Seventh Crusade (14th-century illumination from The Life and Miracles of Saint Louis by Guillaume de Saint-Pathus).

In preparation for the crusade, Louis stockpiled food and wine in Cyprus, largely imported from Apulia with Emperor Frederick's approval. The fleet was supplied by Genoa and Marseilles, with extra ships built even in distant Scottish ports. It assembled at the new harbour of Aigues-Mortes, where thousands of volunteers—archers and foot soldiers—sought to enlist, but Louis refused them. The fleet sailed on 25 August 1248. The crusaders wintered in Cyprus, where plague killed many, though reinforcements, including Geoffrey II of Achaea with 400 knights, strengthened their ranks. They left Cyprus on 30 May 1249 and captured Damietta a week later. By then Ayyub was in poor health, yet the crusaders delayed advancing for months, fearing the Nile floods and awaiting reinforcements. They moved towards Cairo only days before Ayyub died on 23 November 1249. His death was concealed as envoys summoned his heir Turanshah from Iraq.

Egyptians blocked the crusaders from crossing the Nile to Al Mansurah, a key garrison town, with Greek fire. On 6 February 1251 Robert of Artois led a surprise assault across a ford. The Egyptian commander Fakhr al-Din was killed, but Robert's forces were trapped in Al Mansurah's narrow streets and almost all were slain despite Louis's attempt to aid them. On 24 February Turanshah took power, blockading the crusaders' camp and unleashing famine and plague. Too weakened to retreat to Damietta, Louis surrendered on 6 April. Turanshah ordered the slaughter of the poor and sick but released the rest, including Louis, for 800,000 bezants and Damietta's surrender. Before this could be completed, he was assassinated by the Bakhri mamluks, who feared replacement by his own followers. With their backing Shajar al-Durr, Ayyub's widow, assumed power, while Turanshah's treaty remained in force. With Templar help, half the ransom (400,000 bezants) was paid, and Damietta evacuated before Louis and much of his army sailed for Acre on 6 May. The rest was secured by hostages.

When news of Louis's defeat reached France, a charismatic preacher known as the "master of Hungary" proclaimed a new crusade. Claiming to bear a letter from the Virgin Mary to shepherds, he rallied followers from northern France and Flanders to free the Holy Land. This movement, later called the Shepherds' Crusade, attacked Jews in central France before royal forces dispersed it in June 1250. After the Egyptian defeat, most French crusaders, including Louis's surviving brothers, abandoned the campaign, but Louis remained in Palestine with c. 1,000 troops. He rebuilt Caesarea, Jaffa and Sidon, and fortified Acre's suburb using revenue from a crusader tax on the French clergy. Though Louis held no legal claim to the Kingdom of Jerusalem, still nominally ruled by the absent Conrad, his authority went unchallenged. After Emperor Frederick II died in December 1250, Conrad succeeded him in Sicily and Germany but was soon targeted by the political crusade proclaimed against his father.

Amid struggles between mamluk factions and Ayyubid princes, Louis opened negotiations with the Egyptian leaders in early 1252. They pledged to free hostages and restore much of the Kingdom of Jerusalem, but the pact failed that April when they made peace with An-Nasir, Ayyubid ruler of Aleppo and Damascus. As unrest grew in France, Louis resolved to return. Before leaving the Holy Land on 24 April 1254, he secured a ten-year truce with An-Nasir and left a garrison of 100 knights at Acre under the distinguished soldier Geoffrey of Sergines.

=== Mamluks, Mongols and Ghibellines ===
Shortly after Louis IX left Egypt for Acre, Shajar al-Durr married the Bahri commander Aybak, who became the first Mamluk sultan, founding a regime that ruled Egypt for over 250 years. Unlike the hereditary Ayyubids, the Mamluks chose rulers from the military elite and vigorously waged jihad to expel the Franks from the Levant. In the 1250s the Bahri commander Baybars was exiled amid factional rivalries, while his rival Qutuz seized power in Egypt.

Louis's return to France in 1254 left a power vacuum in Jerusalem. The regent Henry I had been succeeded by his infant son Hugh II in Cyprus the previous year. Soon after Louis's departure King Conrad died; his two-year-old son Conradin, though residing in Bavaria, was recognised as king of Jerusalem. In 1255 Jerusalemite barons agreed a ten-year truce with Egypt, but next year rivalry between Venice and Genoa sparked the War of Saint Sabas, dividing merchant communities, military orders and the aristocracy in the Crusader states. In 1258 the child Hugh II was named regent for Conradin, with his mother Plaisance of Antioch acting for him.

As some Mongols followed the Eastern Syriac (Nestorian) Church, hopes of alliance led popes and Louis IX to send envoys to the Great Khans, who instead demanded submission. In 1258 Hulegu, the Mongol il khan, sacked Baghdad and ended the Abbasid Caliphate. Bohemond VI of Antioch–Tripoli accepted Mongol suzerainty and joined their army to seize Damascus in 1260. Jerusalem's leaders, distrusting the Mongols, persuaded Pope Alexander IV to excommunicate Bohemond and proclaim an anti-Mongol crusade. Qutuz executed Hulegu's envoys, prompting a Mongol advance under the Christian commander Kitbuqa. Qutuz and Baybars reconciled and routed the Mongols at the Battle of Ain Jalut in 1260; they then occupied Muslim Syria. Baybars murdered Qutuz in October and assumed power in Egypt.

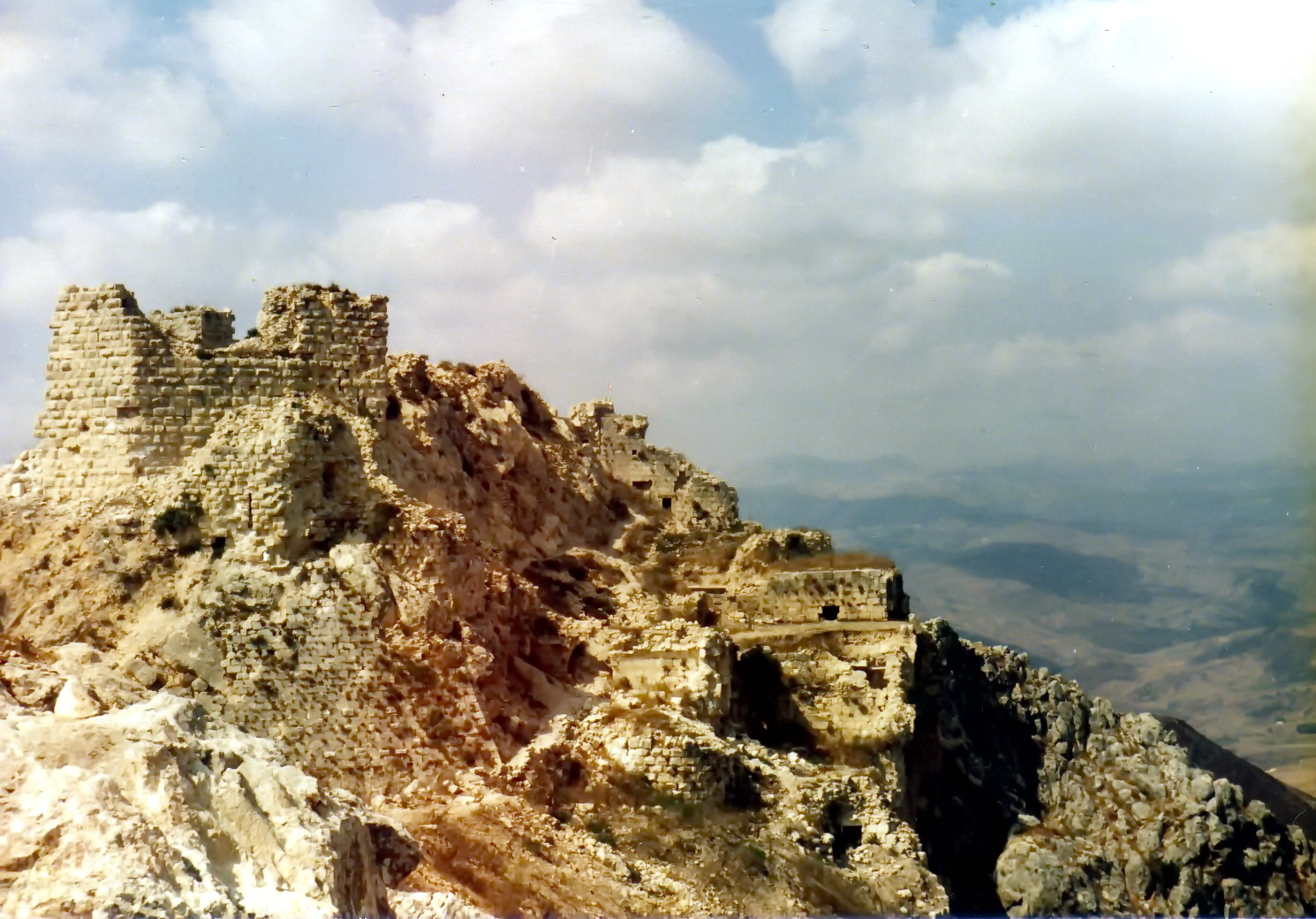
Beaufort Castle, captured by Baybars from the Knights Templars in 1268

Baybars allied with Hulegu's rival Berke Khan of the Golden Horde and from 1261 raided the Crusader states. He sacked Saint Symeon in 1262, destroyed the Church of the Annunciation in Nazareth and Acre's suburbs in 1263. After Hulegu's death in 1265 he launched a systematic conquest: seizing and razing Caesarea, Haifa and Arsuf, capturing Safed, and taking Jaffa, Beaufort and Antioch by 1268. His campaigns often included massacres of Christians.

Meanwhile, as the historian Jean Richard notes, "those who wanted to earn the crusade indulgence did not lack opportunities" in Europe. The papacy, regarding Emperor Frederick II's heirs as its main foes, used crusade proclamations to tax clerical revenues. After King Conrad's death his half-brother Manfred of Sicily became the target of a crusade. In northern Italy the Ghibelline (anti-papal) brothers Ezzelino and Alberico da Romano were crushed. The Nicaean reconquest of Constantinople prompted a crusade against Emperor Michael VIII Palaiologos, but the exiled Latin emperor Baldwin II did not gain support. Only small contingents reached the Holy Land, among them French troops under Olivier de Termes, who replaced Geoffrey of Sergines in 1264, and Odo of Nevers with fifty knights in 1265.

In 1264 Pope Urban IV granted Sicily to Charles of Anjou, who secured it by defeating Manfred at the Battle of Benevento in February 1266. Conradin—Manfred's nephew—tried to recover southern Italy but was crushed by a crusade at the Battle of Tagliacozzo in August 1268 and executed. Two rivals then claimed the throne of Jerusalem: Hugh III, successor to Hugh II in Cyprus, and his aunt Maria of Antioch. The Jerusalemite barons backed Hugh, but Maria maintained her claim.

=== Eighth Crusade ===
Baybars's conquests revived crusading zeal in Europe. Pope Urban IV called a new crusade in 1265, but planning advanced mainly under his successor Clement IV after Charles of Anjou's triumph in southern Italy. Clement first proposed a passagium particulare—a modest, quickly raised force—to sail by April 1267, but delayed when Louis IX of France again took the cross on 25 March 1267. Abaqa, the new Mongol il khan, offered alliance against the Mamluks, but war with his rival Baraq Khan hindered any Levantine campaign.

Funding came from a three-year, 10% clerical levy, legacies, indulgence sales and plunder from Jewish bankers. Louis financed vassals with gifts and loans. He persuaded the English crown prince Edward to take the cross despite Henry III's objections, and won James I of Aragon's pledge by diplomacy. Louis's leadership strengthened during the long sede vacante after Clement's death in November 1268. He hired Genoese ships and mediated peace between Genoa and Venice. James sailed first from Barcelona on 4 September 1269, but a storm scattered his fleet and he soon abandoned the crusade. His two illegitimate sons, Fernando Sánchez and Pedro Fernández, reached Acre with fewer than 200 knights that October. They joined the French garrison, but were ambushed by Baybars.

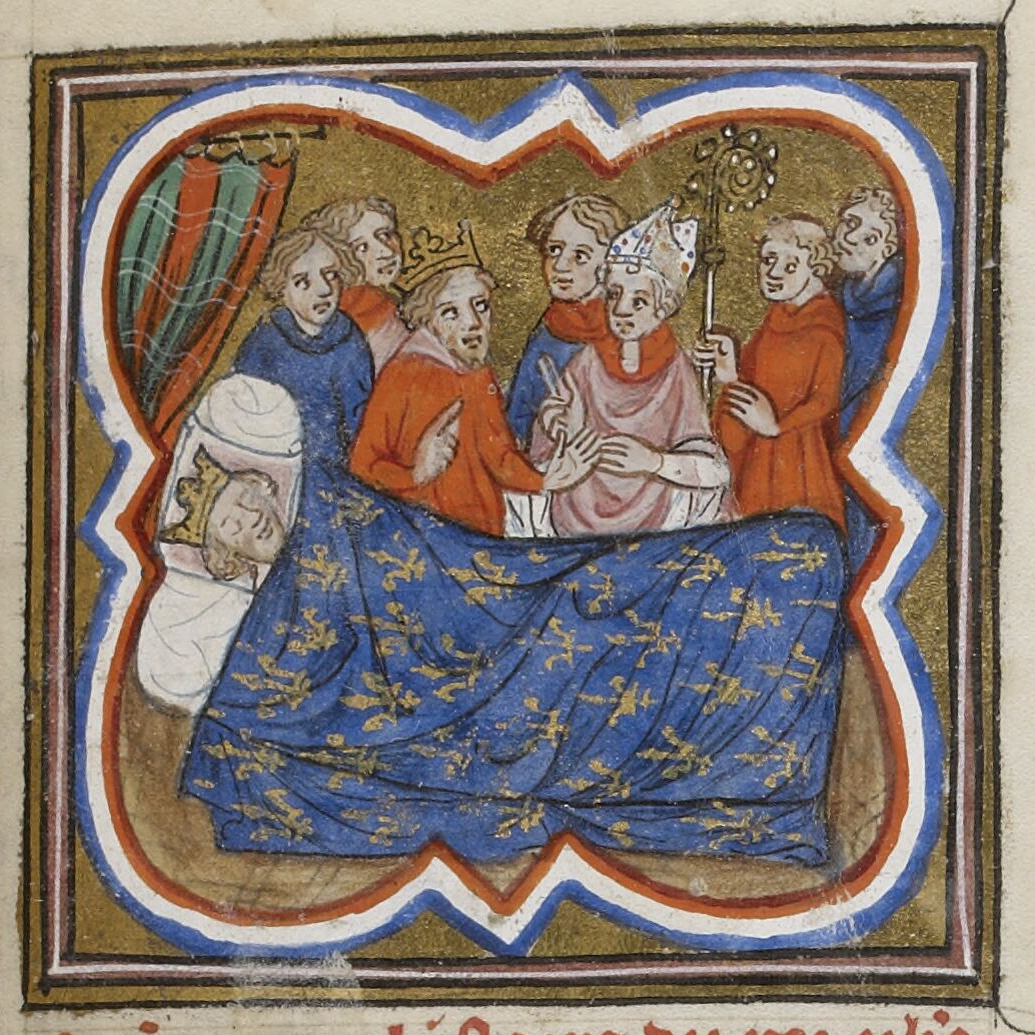
Charles of Anjou at the deathbed of his elder brother, Louis IX of France at Tunis during the Eighth Crusade (from a 14th-century manuscript of the Grandes Chroniques de France

Over 10,000 French crusaders sailed from Aigues-Mortes on 2 July 1270. Louis chose to attack Tunis, capital of the new Hafsid Caliphate in North Africa. Some historians, including Peter Lock, attribute this to his brother Charles of Anjou, while others, such as Christopher Tyerman, see it as Louis's own plan to secure a base for invading Egypt. The crusaders reached North Africa on 18 July and captured Carthage, but plague ravaged the camp. Louis died on 25 August, the day Charles arrived. Charles assumed command and on 1 November made peace with the Caliph Muhammad: the crusaders withdrew for 210,000 gold ounces and rights to Christian worship and proselytism. English crusaders landed at Tunis as the French departed on 10 November. The fleets regrouped at Trapani, but a storm wrecked most ships.

Philip III of France, Louis's successor, and Charles abandoned the crusade, but the English continued with Frisians and other small groups. These sailed to Acre, while the English wintered in Sicily, reaching Acre only on 9 May 1271. Meanwhile, Baybars seized Chastel Blanc from the Templars and Krak des Chevaliers and Gibelacar from the Hospitallers. Edward mounted no major operations; in June Baybars took Montfort Castle, the Franks' last inland stronghold, from the Teutonic Knights. On 12 May 1272 Baybars accepted an almost eleven-year truce, and Edward—now king of England—sailed from Acre in late September.

=== Final crusades in the Holy Land ===
The Italian cardinal Tedaldo Visconti was at Acre when elected pope as Gregory X. Convinced of a divine mission to recover the Holy Land, he worked with Philip III of France to send small knightly expeditions as a prelude to a major crusade. In 1272–1273 he commissioned reports for an ecumenical council. One, the Collectio scandalis Ecclesiae ('Collection of Church Abuses') by a Franciscan, condemned clerical taxation, redemption of crusader vows and secular feuds. The Dominican Humbert of Romans urged preaching as Christianity's principal means of conversion but upheld crusading as a duty to defend the faithful. The Franciscan Fidentius of Padua deemed crusades essential against Muslim obstinacy; the Dominican William of Tripoli preferred peaceful proselytism.

The Second Council of Lyon opened on 7 May 1274. Gregory X proclaimed a new crusade, setting 1278 as the departure date and funding it by taxing clerical income for six years. The plan drew criticism: the troubadour Folquet de Lunel accused the pope of seeking to divert crusading zeal against Christian foes. Threatened by Charles of Anjou's ambitions, Emperor Michael VIII acknowledged papal supremacy but failed to enforce church union at home. Gregory ordered Charles to renew his truce with Byzantium, and talks began on Byzantine participation in the crusade. In 1275 Philip III, the new German king Rudolf of Habsburg and his rival Ottokar II of Bohemia took the cross, but preparations collapsed with Gregory's death next year. Yet the crusade tax remained in force.

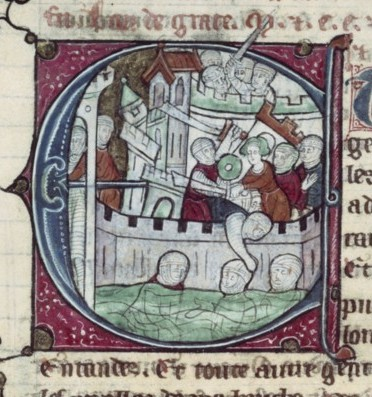
A miniature from c. 1300 depicting the 1291 Siege of Acre, the fall of which marked the end of Crusader rule in the Holy Land.

The subsequent period, as the historian Norman Housley observes, "was dominated by the ambitions of Charles of Anjou". In 1277 Charles purchased Maria of Antioch's claim to Jerusalem. Her rival Hugh III had withdrawn to Cyprus, and the barons of Jerusalem did homage to Charles. In 1279 the Bahri veteran Qalawun seized power in Mamluk Egypt. Facing revolts and a Mongol invasion of Syria, he renewed the truce with the Crusader states in 1281. That year Charles, backed by Pope Martin IV after Michael VIII failed to implement the 1274 church union, pursued an anti-Byzantine policy. Martin granted crusade indulgences for Charles's planned campaign, but the Sicilian Vespers—a popular uprising—forced him to recall his troops in 1282. As Peter III of Aragon backed the rebels, Martin proclaimed a crusade against Aragon, diverting funds raised for the Holy Land.

The withdrawal of Charles's troops let Hugh III recover Tyre and Beirut. Meanwhile, Qalawun defeated the Mongols at the Second Battle of Homs and resumed jihad against the Franks, seizing the Hospitallers' last fortress, Margat, taking Latakia and capturing Tripoli by 1289. Tripoli's fall shocked the West. Pope Nicholas IV sent 4,000 livres tournois and 13 galleys to Acre; Edward I of England dispatched troops to strengthen its defences. A new crusade was preached, prompting a passagium particulare of 3,540 Italian infantry. In August 1290 they attacked Muslims at Acre despite the truce. In retaliation Qalawun's son, Khalil, besieged and took Acre on 28 May 1291. The last Frankish mainland strongholds soon fell, the final, Château Pèlerin, surrendering on 14 August. The conquests brought massacres and enslavement, with only a few escaping to Cyprus.

== Aftermath ==
The fall of the Frankish East caused dismay rather than shock in the West and Western Christians mostly blamed the Franks' alleged immorality. Pope Nicholas IV appealed to Edward I of England to lead a new crusade and imposed a tax to fund it, but the Gascon War with Philip IV of France ended English plans in 1294. Schemes to recover the Holy Land inspired treatises: Fidentius of Padua and Charles II of Naples urged a blockade of Egypt; James of Molay, Templar Grand Master, called for a large crusade; and the Armenian prince-turned-monk Hayton of Corycus proposed a two-stage expedition.

Amid frequent wars among Catholic powers, the crusade declined into a mainly political instrument. In 1297 Pope Boniface VIII proclaimed crusades against his enemies, the Colonna cardinals and Frederick III of Sicily. His taxation of clergy provoked conflict with France, leading to the Pope's seizure by French troops in 1303. French influence grew, and the papal court moved to Avignon. In 1307 French officers arrested all Templars on charges of corruption and heresy; Pope Clement V could not prevent the dissolution of their Order in 1312. The Templar trials prompted new crusade plans, notably by the French William of Nogaret and Pierre Dubois. In 1314 Philip IV took the cross with his sons and son-in-law Edward II of England, but his death next year ended the plan. Philip VI of France, the first Valois king, revived Levantine crusade proposals, but the Hundred Years' War stopped preparations in 1336. The final crusade for the Holy Land, the Alexandrian Crusade, was led by Peter I of Cyprus: in October 1365 crusaders sacked the Egyptian port of Alexandria but withdrew after a week.

Elsewhere crusading endured. In 1391, Duke Philip the Bold of Burgundy proposed a new Crusade. In 1396, a French and Burgundian army joined the Kingdom of Hungary in an invasion of the Ottoman Empire. The crusading army was crushed at Nicopolis.

In Iberia, crusading ended in 1492 with the fall of the Muslim Emirate of Granada to Castile and Aragon. In the Baltic, the Teutonic Knights waged anti-pagan wars, drawing crusaders from France, Germany and England until the 1410s. After the Reformation the papacy occasionally granted indulgences against Protestants, but more often Catholic powers formed papally sponsored Holy Leagues against the Ottoman Empire into the 17th century.

== Legacy ==
The Crusades created national mythologies, tales of heroism, and a few place names. Historical parallelism and the tradition of drawing inspiration from the Middle Ages have become keystones of political Islam encouraging ideas of a modern jihad and a centuries-long struggle against Christian states, while secular Arab nationalism highlights the role of Western imperialism. Modern Muslim thinkers, politicians and historians have drawn parallels between the crusades and political developments such as the establishment of Israel in 1948.

Right-wing circles in the western world have drawn opposing parallels, considering Christianity to be under an Islamic religious and demographic threat that is analogous to the situation at the time of the crusades. Crusader symbols and anti-Islamic rhetoric are presented as an appropriate response. These symbols and rhetoric are used to provide a religious justification and inspiration for a struggle against a religious enemy.

== Historiography ==
The historiography of the Crusades is concerned with their "history of the histories" during the Crusader period. The subject is a complex one, with overviews provided in Select Bibliography of the Crusades, Modern Historiography, and Crusades (Bibliography and Sources). The histories describing the Crusades are broadly of three types: (1) The primary sources of the Crusades, which include works written in the medieval period, generally by participants in the Crusade or written contemporaneously with the event, letters and documents in archives, and archaeological studies; (2) secondary sources, beginning with early consolidated works in the 16th century and continuing to modern times; and (3) tertiary sources, primarily encyclopedias, bibliographies and genealogies.

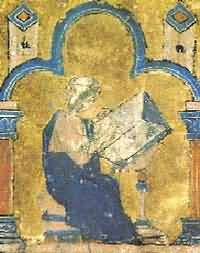
William of Tyre writing his history, from a 13th-century Old French translation, Bibliothèque Nationale, Paris, MS 2631, f.1r

=== Primary sources ===
The primary sources for the Crusades are generally presented in the individual articles on each Crusade and summarised in the list of sources for the Crusades. For the First Crusade, this includes the original Latin chronicles, including the Gesta Francorum, works by Albert of Aachen and Fulcher of Chartres, the Alexiad by Byzantine princess Anna Komnene, the Complete Work of History by Muslim historian Ali ibn al-Athir, and the Chronicle of Armenian historian Matthew of Edessa. Many of these and related texts are found in the collections Recueil des historiens des croisades (RHC) and Crusade Texts in Translation. The work of William of Tyre, Historia Rerum in Partibus Transmarinis Gestarum, and its continuations by later historians complete the foundational work of the traditional Crusade. Some of these works also provide insight into the later Crusades and Crusader states. Other works include:

- Eyewitness accounts of the Second Crusade by Odo of Deuil and Otto of Freising. The Arab view from Damascus is provided by ibn al-Qalanisi.
- Works on the Third Crusade such as Libellus de Expugnatione Terrae Sanctae per Saladinum expeditione, the Itinerarium Regis Ricardi, and the works of Crusaders Tageno and Roger of Howden, and the narratives of Richard of Devizes, Ralph de Diceto, Ralph of Coggeshall and Arnold of Lübeck. The Arabic works by al-Isfahani and al-Maqdisi as well as the biography of Saladin by Baha ad-Din ibn Shaddad are also of interest.
- The Fourth Crusade is described in the Devastatio Constantinopolitana and works of Geoffrey of Villehardouin, in his chronicle De la Conquête de Constantinople, Robert de Clari and Gunther of Pairis. The view of Byzantium is provided by Niketas Choniates and the Arab perspective is given by Abū Shāma and Abu'l-Fida.
- The history of the Fifth and Sixth Crusades is well represented in the works of Jacques de Vitry, Oliver of Paderborn and Roger of Wendover, and the Arabic works of Badr al-Din al-Ayni.
- Key sources for the later Crusades include Gestes des Chiprois, Jean de Joinville's Life of Saint Louis, as well as works by Guillaume de Nangis, Matthew Paris, Fidentius of Padua and al-Makrizi.

After the fall of Acre, the crusades continued through the 16th century. Principal references on this subject are the Wisconsin Collaborative History of the Crusades and Norman Housley's The Later Crusades, 1274–1580: From Lyons to Alcazar. Complete bibliographies are also given in these works.

=== Secondary sources ===
The secondary sources of the Crusades began in the 16th century, with one of the first uses of the term crusades by 17th-century French historian Louis Maimbourg in his Histoire des Croisades pour la délivrance de la Terre Sainte. Other works of the 18th century include Voltaire's Histoire des Croisades, and Edward Gibbon's Decline and Fall of the Roman Empire, excerpted as The Crusades, A.D. 1095–1261. This edition also includes an essay on chivalry by Walter Scott, whose works helped popularize the Crusades. Early in the 19th century, the monumental Histoire des Croisades was published by the French historian Joseph François Michaud, a major new narrative based on original sources.

These histories have provided evolving views of the Crusades as discussed in detail in the Historiography writeup in Crusading movement. Modern works that serve as secondary source material are listed in the Bibliography section below.

=== Tertiary sources ===
Three such works are Louis Bréhier's multiple works on the Crusades in the Catholic Encyclopedia; the works of Ernest Barker in the Encyclopædia Britannica (11th edition), later expanded into a separate publication; and The Crusades: An Encyclopedia (2006), edited by historian Alan V. Murray.

== See also ==
- After the First Crusade, 1099–1146
- Between the Crusades, 1149–1189
- Bibliography of the Crusades: modern works
- Chronologies of the Crusades
- Criticism of crusading
- Historians and histories of the Crusades
- History of Christianity
- A History of the Crusades: list of contributions
- History of the Knights Hospitaller in the Levant
- History of the Knights Templar
- Military history of the Crusader states
- Women in the Crusades

== Bibliography ==
- Asbridge, Thomas (2012) [2010]. The Crusades: The War for the Holy Land. Simon and Schuster. ISBN 978-1-8498-3688-3.
- Barber, Malcolm (2004) [1992]. The Two Cities: Medieval Europe 1050–1320 (Second ed.). Routledge. ISBN 978-0-4151-7415-2.
- Cobb, Paul M. (2016) [2014]. The Race for Paradise: An Islamic History of the Crusades. Oxford University Press. ISBN 978-0-1987-8799-0.
- Constable, Giles (2001). "The Historiography of the Crusades". In Laiou, Angeliki E.; Mottahedeh, Roy Parviz (eds.). The Crusades from the Perspectives of Byzantium and the Muslim World. Dumbarton Oaks Research Library. pp. 1–22. ISBN 978-0-88402-277-0.
- Constable, Giles (2020) [2008]. Crusaders and Crusading in the Twelfth Century. Routledge. ISBN 978-0-367-74017-7.
- Ellenblum, Ronnie (2012). The Collapse of the Eastern Mediterranean: Climate Change and the Decline of the East, 950–1072. Cambridge University Press. ISBN 978-1-1070-2335-2.
- Epstein, Steven A. (2009). An Economic and Social History of Later Medieval Europe, 1000–1500. Cambridge University Press. ISBN 978-0-521-70653-7.
- Housley, Norman (2001) [1992]. The Later Crusades, 1274–1580: From Lyons to Alcazar. Oxford University Press. ISBN 978-0-19-822136-4.
- Jaspert, Nikolas (2006) [2003]. The Crusades. Routledge. ISBN 978-0-4153-5968-9.
- Jotischky, Andrew (2017) [2004]. Crusading and the Crusader States (Second ed.). Routledge. ISBN 978-1-1388-0806-5.
- Lock, Peter (2006). The Routledge Companion to the Crusades. Routledge Companions to History. Routledge. doi:10.4324/9780203389638. ISBN 978-0-415-39312-6.
- MacEvitt, Christopher (2008). The Crusades and the Christian World of the East: Rough Tolerance. The Middle Ages. University of Pennsylvania Press. ISBN 978-0-8122-2083-4.
- Madden, Thomas F. (2013). The Concise History of the Crusades. Critical Issues in World and International History (Third ed.). Rowman & Littlefield. ISBN 978-1-4422-1575-7.
- Markowski, Michael (1984). "Crucesignatus: Its Origins and Early Usage". Journal of Medieval History. 10 (3): 157–165. doi:10.1016/0304-4181(84)90032-0. ISSN 0304-4181.
- Mayer, Hans Eberhard (2009) [1965]. The Crusades. Translated by John Gillingham (Second ed.). Oxford University Press. ISBN 978-0-19-873097-2.
- Nicholson, Helen (2004). The Crusades. Greenwood Guides to Historic Events of the Medieval World. Greenwood Press. ISBN 978-0-313-32685-1.
- Onions, C. T.; Friedrichsen, G. W. S.; Bruchfield, R. W., eds. (1966). The Oxford Dictionary of English Etymology. Oxford University Press. ISBN 978-0-19-861112-7.
- Phillips, Jonathan (2010). Holy Warriors: A Modern History of the Crusades. Random House. ISBN 978-1-8459-5078-1.
- Phillips, Jonathan (2014) [2002]. The Crusades, 1095–1204. Seminar Studies (Second ed.). Routledge. ISBN 978-1-4058-7293-5.
- Poly, Jean-Pierre (1997). "Europe in the Year 1000". In Fossier, Robert (ed.). 950–1250. The Cambridge Illustrated History of the Middle Ages. Vol. II. Translated by Stuart Airlie; Robyn Marsack. Cambridge University Press. pp. 17–79. ISBN 978-0-521-26645-1.
- Richard, Jean C. (1999). The Crusades, c. 1071–c. 1291. Cambridge Medieval Textbooks. Cambridge University Press. ISBN 978-0-521-62566-1.
- Rouche, Michael (1989). "Autopsy of the West: The Early Fifth Century". In Fossier, Robert (ed.). 350–950. The Cambridge Illustrated History of the Middle Ages. Vol. I. Translated by Jonet Sondheimer. Cambridge University Press. pp. 17–51. ISBN 978-0-521-26644-4.
- Sheffler, David L. (2015). "Myths of Innocence: The Making of the Children Crusade". In Andrea, Alfred J.; Holt, Andrew (eds.). Seven Myths of the Crusades. Hackett Publishing Company. pp. 91–105. ISBN 978-1-62466-403-8.
- Tibble, Steve (2020) [2018]. The Crusader Armies. Yale University Press. ISBN 978-0-300-25322-1.
- Tyerman, Christopher (2007) [2006]. God's War: A History of the Crusades. Penguin Books. ISBN 978-0-1402-6980-2.
- Tyerman, Christopher (2019). The World of the Crusades. Yale University Press. ISBN 978-0-300-21739-1.
