= Papal income tax =

Church tax to fund Christian Holy Wars

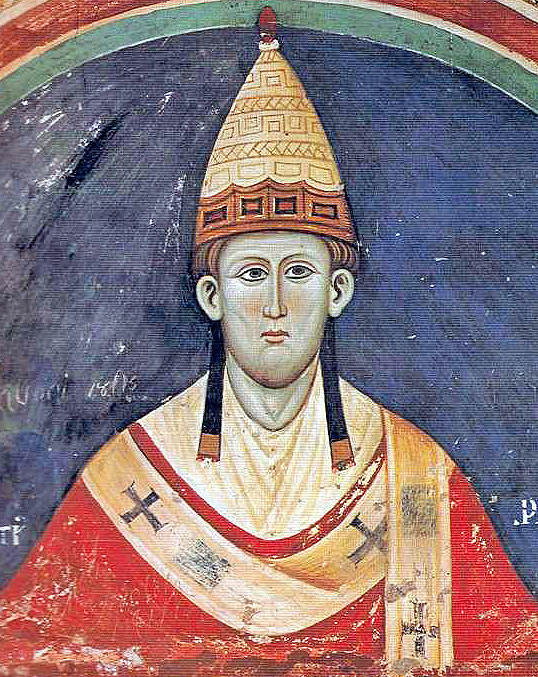
Pope Innocent III was the first pope to impose an income tax.

Papal income tax was first levied in 1199 by Pope Innocent III, originally requiring all Catholic clergy to pay one-fortieth of their ecclesiastical income annually in support of the Crusades. The second income tax was not levied until the Fourth Lateran Council in 1215, and constituted only a triennial twentieth.

This precedent was frequently continued by the successors of Innocent III, enforced by ecclesiastical censure, by sequestration, and frequently by the use of force. The first time the tax was imposed, contributors were promised that a quarter of the penances would be rebated if payments were made willingly and honestly; the second time, non-compliance was simply threatened with excommunication. On a few occasions popes convoked a general council before imposing an income tax, but more often imposed the tax solely on their own authority.

The power was later used for Crusades outside of the Holy Land. For example, Pope Gregory IX in 1228 levied a one-tenth income tax to fund his war against Frederick II, Holy Roman Emperor. By 1253, the phrase "ecclesiastical revenues and receipts" was defined more carefully, and interpreted to include temporalities as well as spiritualities. In 1274, the lessons from the past taxes were aggregated and compiled into a set of instructions for the collectors in France under the direction of Gregory X, in the tear that the Second Council of Lyon ordered a sexennial tenth. Pope Boniface VIII included the tax code in canon law in 1301.

Fourteenth and fifteenth century popes leveled similar taxes for personal uses as well as for wars against the Ottoman Turks and others. Taxes could be imposed either on the universal church, the clergy of a single country, or even on a group of provinces. Whereas the first crusading taxes were paid directly to crusaders, by the middle of the thirteenth century it became customary to pay the tax directly to kings, princes, or nobles who promised to join the crusade; if the crusade never took place, the money was to be returned to the Apostolic Camera.

Nonpayment of papal taxes was rampant, and secular rulers of even modest power could usually succeed in placing restrictions on papal taxes collected within their realm, if not in obtaining a portion for themselves, or even persuading the papacy to merely act as an intermediary in levying their own taxes (with or without the pretext of the crusade). For example, Edward I and Edward II succeeded in obtaining more than half of the customary tenth for themselves, as did the French kings during the Avignon Papacy.
