= Crusading movement =

Framework of Christian holy war

The Crusading movement was a major religious, political, and military endeavour of the Middle Ages, generally dated from the Council of Clermont (1095), at which Pope Urban II proclaimed the First Crusade, an armed expedition in support of Eastern Christians under Muslim rule. He framed it as a form of penitential pilgrimage. By this point, papal authority had grown through church reforms, and tensions with secular rulers encouraged the notion of holy war—combining classical just war theory, biblical precedents, and Augustine's teachings on legitimate violence. Armed pilgrimage aligned with the era's Christocentric and militant Catholicism, sparking widespread enthusiasm. Western expansion was further enabled by economic growth, the decline of older Mediterranean powers, and Muslim disunity. These factors allowed crusaders to seize territory and found four Crusader states in the Levant, whose defence inspired successive Crusades. The papacy also launched crusading campaigns against other targets—Muslims in Iberia, paganism in the Baltics, and other opponents of papal authority.

Though aimed primarily at the warrior elite through appeals to chivalric ideals, the movement depended on broad support from clergy, townspeople, and peasants. Women, despite being discouraged, were involved as participants, proxies for absent crusaders, or victims. Although many crusaders were motivated by indulgences (absolution from sins), material gain also played a part. Crusading campaigns were typically initiated through papal bulls, and participants pledged to join by "taking the cross"—sewing a cross onto their garments. Failure to fulfil vows could result in excommunication. Periodic waves of zeal produced unsanctioned "popular crusades".

The papal-sanctioned wars fostered distinctive institutions and ideologies. Initially funded through improvised means, later campaigns received more organized support via papal taxes on clergy and the sale of indulgences. Core crusading forces were heavily armed knights, backed by infantry, local troops, and naval aid from maritime cities. Crusaders secured their holdings by building strong castles, and the fusion of chivalric and monastic ideals led to the rise of military orders. The movement extended Western Christendom and created new frontier states, some of which survived into the early modern period. Crusading encouraged cultural exchange and left lasting marks on European art and literature. Despite a decline during the Reformation, anti-Ottoman "holy leagues" sustained the tradition into the 18th century.

== Background ==
The Crusades are commonly defined as Christian religious wars waged by Western European warriors during the Middle Ages to capture Jerusalem. Related campaigns differed markedly in spatial reach, temporal limits, and motivating aims. The wider crusading movement fostered distinctive institutions and ideologies that shaped society in Catholic Europe and neighbouring regions.

=== Classical just war theories ===
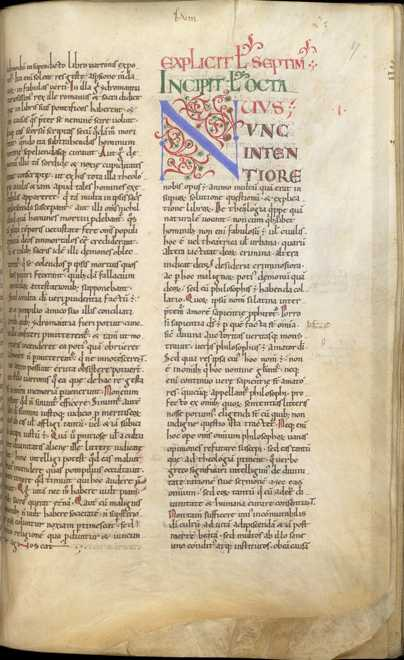
A page from an early 12th-century manuscript of The City of God by Augustine

In classical antiquity, Greek philosophers and Roman jurists formulated just war theories that later influenced crusading theology. Aristotle stressed the need for a just end, asserting "war must be for the sake of peace". Roman law required a just cause and held that only legitimate authorities could declare war; defence, restitution, and punishment were considered acceptable grounds.

Although the Bible—Christianity's core scripture—presents conflicting views on violence, (Note: The Old Testament depicts the Israelites' wars against their enemies as divinely sanctioned, yet also includes the Fifth Commandment's prohibition of killing. In the New Testament, Jesus states that "all who take the sword will perish by the sword", but also declares, "I have not come to bring peace but a sword.") the 4th-century Christianisation of the Roman Empire led to the development of Christian just war theory. Bishop Ambrose was the first theologian to equate enemies of the Christian state with those of the Church.

In 395, the Roman Empire was permanently divided into eastern and western halves. Fifteen years later, the sack of the city of Rome led Augustine—Ambrose's student—to write The City of God in which he argued that the Bible's prohibition on killing did not apply to wars waged with divine approval. He held that just war must be declared by legitimate authority, pursued for a just cause once peaceful means had failed, and conducted with restraint and good intent. His reflections were nearly forgotten after the fall of the Western Roman Empire in 476.

=== Tripartite world ===
From the ruins of the Western empire, new Christian kingdoms emerged, largely ruled by Germanic warlords. Among this aristocracy, martial prowess and comradeship were core values. Clergy often praised their violence in pursuit of patronage, though the Church still deemed killing sinful and required penance—typically fasting—for absolution.

Meanwhile, the Eastern Roman (Byzantine) Empire endured, though much of its territory, including Jerusalem, was conquered by the rapidly expanding Islamic Caliphate by the mid-7th century. Islam's holiest text, the Quran, addresses jihad—struggle to spread and defend the faith. (Note: While both jihad and the crusades are forms of holy war, there is no evidence of a direct connection between them. The historian Paul M. Cobb attributes their similarities to "their common roots in a universal monotheism whose God is a jealous god".) In the early 8th century, Muslim forces entered Europe, conquering much of the Iberian Peninsula. Christians under Muslim rule had to pay a special tax, the jizya. As conquests stabilized, a threefold civilisational order emerged: a fragmented Western Europe, a weakened Byzantium, and an ascendant Islamic world.

=== Holy wars and piety ===
Resistance to Muslim advance led to the creation of the small Kingdom of Asturias in north-western Iberia. Over time, this resistance evolved into an expansionist movement, regarded by locals as divinely sanctioned. In the 9th century, repeated invasions by non-Christian groups across Western Europe revived the notion of holy war: conflict authorized by a spiritual leader, pursued for religious aims, and rewarded with salvation. Leo IV was the first pope to promise salvation in 846 to those defending the papal territories.

As warfare became constant, a new military class of mounted warriors emerged. Known as milites in contemporary texts, they specialized in weapons like the heavy lance. To restrain their violence, church leaders launched the Peace of God movement. Ironically, efforts to curb bloodshed militarized the Church, as bishops increasingly raised armies to enforce the Peace.

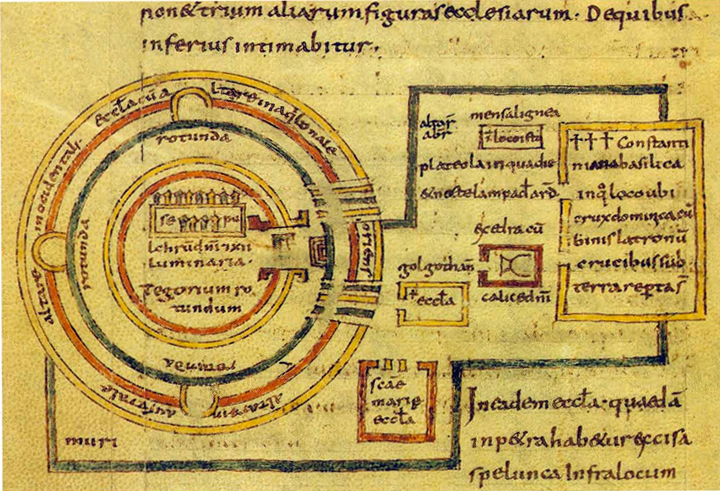
Plan of the Church of the Holy Sepulchre in an early 9th-century manuscript of De locis sanctis ('About Sacred Places'), a work by the Irish monk Adomnán

With weak central authority, regional strongmen seized control of parishes and abbeys, often appointing unfit clergy. Believers feared such irregularities invalidated sacraments, heightening anxiety over damnation. Sinners were expected to confess and perform penance to be reconciled with the Church. Since penance could be burdensome, priests began offering indulgences—commuting penance into acts like almsgiving or pilgrimage. Penitential journeys to Palestine, known as the Holy Land, held special value, as the region was associated with Jesus's ministry and contained the Church of the Holy Sepulchre, believed to mark his crucifixion and resurrection.

=== Church reforms ===
In an age of endemic violence, concern over damnation intensified, fostering reform movements within the Church, which was regarded as the channel through which divine grace was dispensed. In 910, Cluny Abbey's foundation charter set a precedent by granting monks the right to freely elect their abbot. The Cluniac Reform spread rapidly, backed by aristocrats who valued the monks' prayers for their souls. Cluniac houses answered solely to papal authority.

The popes, viewed as the successors of Peter the Apostle, claimed supremacy over the Church, citing Jesus's praise for his apostle. In reality, Roman noble families controlled the papacy until Emperor Henry III entered Rome in 1053. He appointed clerics who launched the Gregorian Reform for the "liberty of the church", banning simony—the sale of church offices—and giving cardinals, senior clergy, the sole right to elect the pope. Andrew Latham, a scholar of international relations, argues that the Gregorian Reform placed the Western Church in conflict with "a range of social forces within and beyond Christendom". By then, divisions in theology and liturgy between Western and Eastern mainstream Christianity had deepened, (Note: The most evident differences between the two Christian communities lay in the unilateral Western alteration of the Nicene Creed, and the eastern use of leavened rather than unleavened bread in the Eucharist—a central rite in Christian liturgy.) leading to mutual excommunications in 1054 and the eventual split between the western Roman Catholic and eastern Orthodox Churches.

A spiritual revival took root as new monastic communities like the Carthusians and Cistercians emerged and the Rule of Saint Augustine spread among secular clergy. Christocentrism—a renewed focus on Christ's life and sufferings—also shaped the period, inspiring itinerant preachers.

== Prelude to the First Crusade ==
Europe on the eve of the Battle of Manzikert

Four major powers dominated the Mediterranean c. 1000: the Umayyads in Al-Andalus (Muslim Spain), the Fatimids in Egypt, the Abbasids (nominally) in the Middle East, and the Byzantine Empire in southeastern Europe and Anatolia. Within decades, all experienced serious crises, particularly in the east, where recurring droughts and cold waves triggered famine and instability. Climate change benefitted Western Europe, fuelling economic and population growth. Western cities remained comparatively small: even the largest, such as Venice and Rome, had fewer than 40,000 inhabitants. (Note: By comparison, the Byzantine capital, Constantinople, is estimated to have exceeded 600,000 inhabitants, while Baghdad in the Abbasid Caliphate and the Fatimid capital, Cairo, had about 500,000, and Córdoba at least 100,000.)

Weakened by internal conflict, Al-Andalus fractured into small states, vulnerable to Christian expansion—a process called the Reconquista. In Egypt and Palestine, repeated failure of the Nile's floods led to famine and interreligious tension. In 1009, the Fatimid caliph Al-Hakim ordered the destruction of the Holy Sepulchre, (Note: A papal encyclical—allegedly issued by Pope Sergius IV after the Holy Sepulchre's destruction—states that he intended to lead a fleet east and rebuild the church, but the document is a late 11th-century forgery produced at Moissac Abbey.) though it was later rebuilt with Byzantine support. Meanwhile, Turkoman migrations from Central Asia destabilized the Middle East. Their chief Tughril I, of the Seljuk clan, seized control of the Abbasid Caliphate in 1055; his successor, Alp Arslan, defeated the Byzantines at Manzikert in 1071, opening Anatolia to Turkoman settlement.

As traditional powers declined, Italian merchants gained control of Mediterranean trade. The Normans, originating in northern France, conquered southern Italy and Sicily by 1091. Their expansion threatened papal interests, prompting Pope Leo IX to launch a military campaign against them. Although his campaign failed, he had promised absolution to its participants—a sign of the papacy's willingness to invoke spiritual incentives for warfare.

Western knights' desire for land and power aligned with increasingly assertive popes who granted absolution for campaigns against Muslim powers in Sicily and Iberia. (Note: Pope Alexander II offered absolution to Normans campaigning Muslim Sicily and promised remission of sins to warriors departing for Iberia.) As these territories were once Christian, papal attention soon turned to Palestine. Pope Gregory VII proposed a campaign to reclaim Jerusalem in 1074, though it never materialized. Soon, disputes over papal and royal authority ignited the Investiture Controversy, during which armed conflict renewed interest in theories of just war. Anselm of Lucca, a canon lawyer, compiled Augustine's writings to argue that war aimed at preventing sin could be an act of love. The theologian Bonizo of Sutri considered those who died in such wars martyrs. These ideas shaped the belief that just warfare could serve as penance.

== Crusading campaigns ==
Revived interest in Augustine's teaching on legitimate violence provided the Western Church with an ideological framework for military engagement. By the late 11th century, amid heightened concern over sin, the papacy was well positioned to mobilize the warrior class's values.

=== First Crusade ===
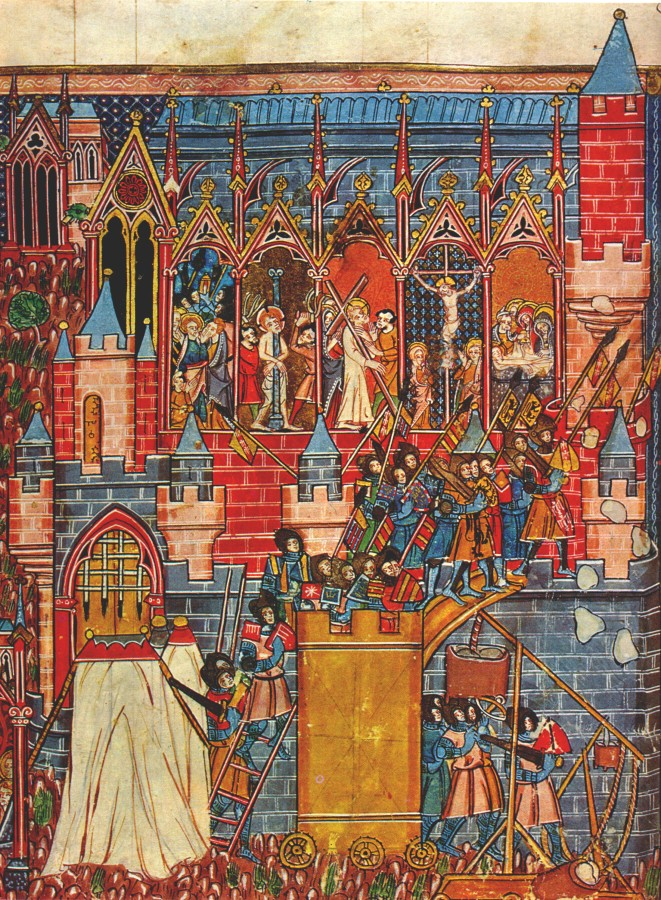
Siege of Jerusalem (1099) (from a 13th-century manuscript of William of Tyre's chronicle)

Facing Turkoman incursions, the Byzantine emperor Alexios I Komnenos sought military aid from Pope Urban II in 1095. Seeing this as a chance to reassert papal authority, Urban called for a campaign against the Turkomans at the Council of Clermont, offering spiritual rewards to participants. The historian Jonathan Riley-Smith views this as a "revolutionary appeal" that linked warfare to pilgrimage.

Urban's appeal sparked unexpected enthusiasm. In early 1096, more than 20,000 poorly organized crusaders set off in what became the People's Crusade. Most perished or were massacred en route. A second wave, better coordinated, followed between August and October in that year, comprising at least 30,000 warriors and as many non-combatants, led by prominent aristocrats including Raymond of Saint-Gilles, Bohemond of Taranto, and Godfrey of Bouillon. They advanced through fragmented Muslim-held territories and captured the cities of Edessa, Antioch, and Jerusalem by July 1099.

=== Crusades for the Holy Land ===
The first crusaders consolidated their conquests into four Crusader states: Edessa, Antioch, Jerusalem, and Tripoli. Their defence prompted new campaigns, the first as early as 1101. Several expeditions, especially those led by monarchs, are distinguished by numerical labels. These campaigns brought about near-continuous warfare in the region, drawing forces from across the wider world, including crusaders from Western Europe, slave soldiers from sub-Saharan Africa, and nomadic horsemen from the Eurasian steppes.

Edessa's fall in 1144 to the Turkoman leader Zengi triggered the Second Crusade, led by Louis VII of France and Conrad III of Germany, which failed in 1148. Zengi's son, Nur al-Din, unified Muslim Syria and dismantled the Fatimid Caliphate. These lands came under the control of Saladin, an ambitious Kurdish general. In 1187, he destroyed the Jerusalemite field army at Hattin and captured most Crusader territory, including the city of Jerusalem.

The resulting crisis triggered the Third Crusade, led by Emperor Frederick I, Richard I of England, and Philip II of France. Although Jerusalem remained under Muslim rule, the Crusader states endured, and the Kingdom of Cyprus was founded on former Byzantine territory. Later Crusades focused on recovering Jerusalem, but the Fourth was diverted by the Byzantine claimant, Alexios Angelos, leading to the sack of Constantinople and the creation of a Latin Empire in the Aegean in 1204. The Fifth Crusade against Egypt failed in 1217–21. The Sixth regained Jerusalem in 1229 through negotiations by the excommunicated Emperor Frederick II, but the city was sacked in 1244 by Khwarazmian raiders. Its loss prompted Louis IX of France to launch the Seventh Crusade in 1248, which ended in defeat.

After the Mamluks supplanted the Ayyubids—Saladin's family—as the dominant Muslim power in the Levant, Sultans Baybars and Qalawun waged systematic campaigns against the Crusader states. Louis IX mounted the Eighth Crusade, but died in 1270. In 1291 Qalawun's son Khalil seized the last Crusader strongholds in the Holy Land. Despite continued proposals to reclaim Jerusalem, (Note: Notable authors of crusade treatises include James I of Aragon, Charles II of Sicily, the last Templar grand master James of Molay, the French minister William of Nogaret, the Armenian aristocrat Hayton of Corycus, the Franciscan friar Fidentius of Padua, and the mystic Ramon Lull.) efforts were hampered by events such as the Hundred Years' War.

=== Other theatres of war ===
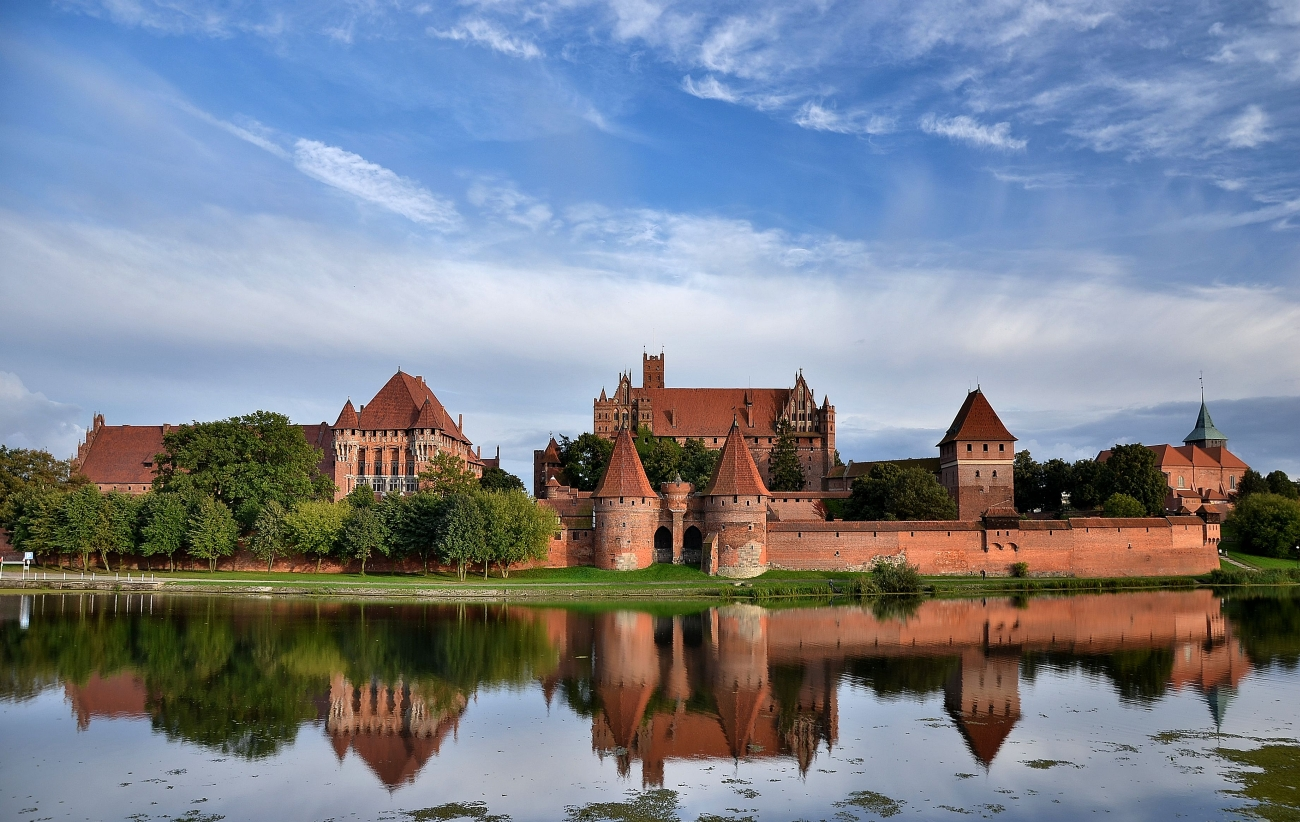
Malbork Castle of the Teutonic Order in Prussia

The historian Simon Lloyd notes that "crusading was never necessarily tied" to the Holy Land. As early as 1096, Pope Urban urged Catalan nobles to remain in Iberia, promising equal spiritual rewards. The First Lateran Council in 1123 officially equated campaigns against the Moors (Iberian Muslims) with Crusades. These papally-sanctioned campaigns drove Christian expansion, reducing Al-Andalus to the Emirate of Granada by 1248. (Note: In 1095, the Almohads—a newly emerged fundamentalist Muslim power—inflicted a heavy defeat on the Castilian royal army at Alarcos, but were decisively routed by a large crusader army at Las Navas de Tolosa in 1213.)

Some crusades emerged from conflict with pagan groups. In 1107–08, Saxon leaders referred to the pagan Slavic Wends' territory as "Our Jerusalem", though anti-Wendish war was recognized as a crusade only in 1147. From then, northern German, Danish, Swedish, and Polish rulers launched papally sanctioned campaigns against Slavic, Baltic, and Finnic tribes—collectively termed as the Northern Crusades. By the 1230s, leadership had passed to the Teutonic Order's warrior monks, who also launched attacks on the neighbouring Orthodox Rus' principalities.

Crusading zeal also turned against Christian foes of the papacy. "Political crusades" were launched against Emperor Frederick II, his heirs, and rebellious papal vassals. (Note: The first "political crusade" was proclaimed by Pope Innocent III in 1199 against Markward of Anweiler, a German aristocrat who contested Innocent's regency claim in Sicily.) From 1209, Pope Innocent III targeted heretics—Christians who rejected Church doctrine—and Crusades were proclaimed after 1261 against the restored Byzantine Empire.

=== Later crusades ===
Despite internal divisions, the Reconquista continued, ending with the conquest of Granada by Castile and Aragon in 1492. In the early 14th century, Preussenreise—seasonal anti-pagan raids in the Baltic—became a hallmark of chivalric culture. (Note: Unlike other crusading theatres, where war and truce alternated, these seasonal campaigns made the Baltic conflicts, in the words of the historian Eric Christiansen, "an interminable crusade".) In the Western Mediterranean, popes also proclaimed crusades against Christian enemies, including Aragon, and Sicily. During the Western Schism (1378–1417), rival popes called crusades against each other's supporters. (Note: At the onset of the schism, Urban VI granted crusading privileges to the English bishop Henry le Despenser to attack the Flemish supporters of his rival, Clement VII, and to the English duke John of Gaunt to campaign against John I of Castile, who also backed Clement.)

Extensive piracy in the Mediterranean revived anti-Muslim crusading in the mid-14th century. (Note: The Aydinids lordship in Anatolia, infamous for its naval raids, was targeted by three crusades between 1333 and 1347.) International campaigns targeted the rising Ottoman Empire but failed to stop the fall of Constantinople in 1453. The Hussite Wars reignited anti-heretical crusades in 1420, and the Reformation saw indulgences granted to Catholics fighting Protestants. Although the Reformation weakened papal authority, the papacy continued to promote crusades, helping form anti-Ottoman "holy leagues" well into the early 18th century.

== Theory and theology ==
Pope Urban II's call at Clermont introduced a remarkably novel concept for most listeners. Though Western Christians had accepted divinely sanctioned warfare, its full theological and legal justification was still evolving.

=== Justification ===
Initially seen as a unique event prompted by divine intervention, the expanding movement soon required stronger legal foundations. The Decretum Gratiani, an influential collection of church law, permitted warfare c. 1140—but only against heretics. Within decades, jurists like Huguccio extended this to Muslims, citing just intent, recovery of Christian lands, and retaliation for violence. Crusading campaigns outside the Holy Land were often justified by the perceived spiritual importance of those regions. (Note: Livonia, a region in the eastern Baltic, provides a clear example: it was depicted by the writer Arnold of Lübeck as the Virgin Mary's dowry.) The Northern Crusades, originally framed as defensive, soon focused on conversion, while Crusades against anti-papal Christians were portrayed as essential to safeguard the Holy Land. The sack of Constantinople was further justified by the murder of the legitimate emperor, Alexios IV, and by the schism with the papacy.

=== Crusade indulgence ===
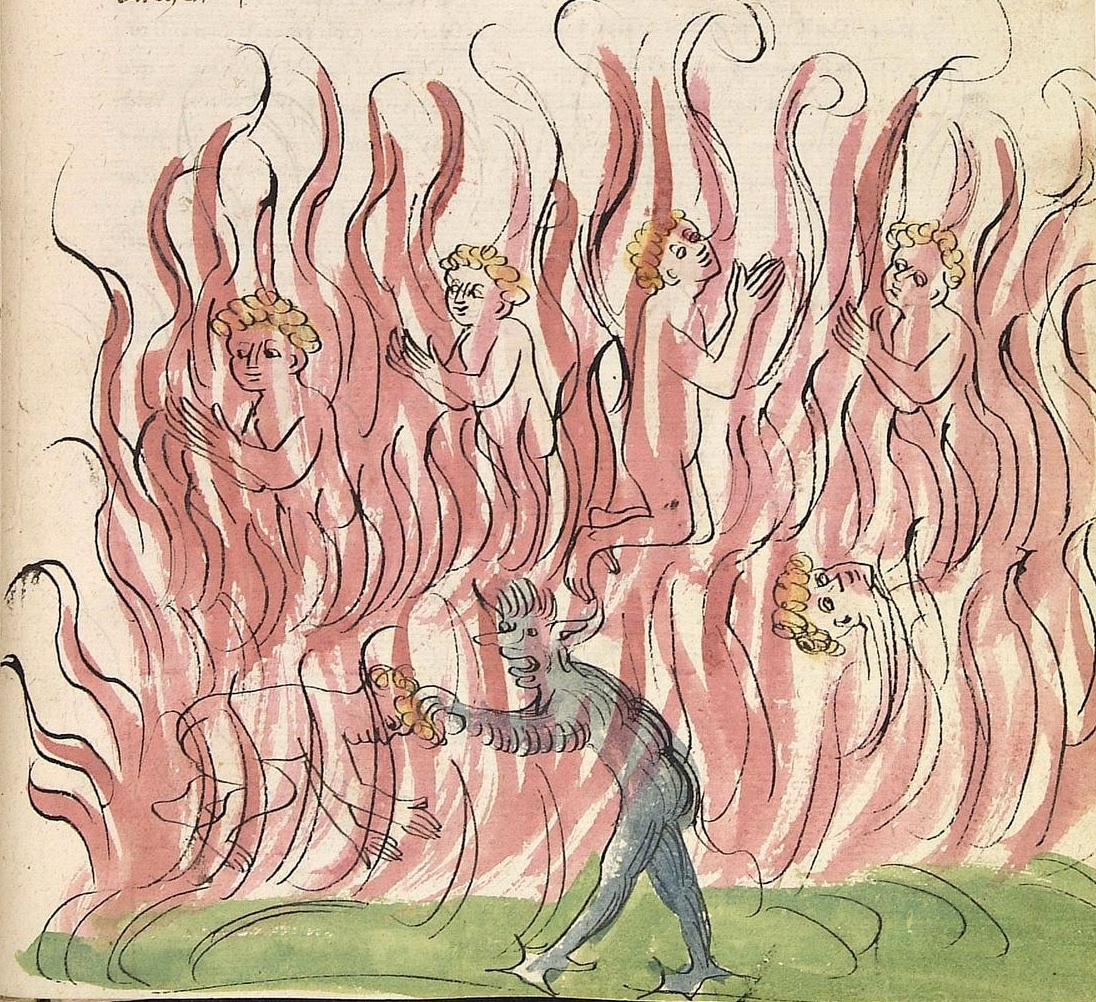
Sinners' (temporal) punishment in the Purgatory (a page from the early 15th-century Alsatian manuscript of the Golden Legend)

Soon after Clermont, the chronicler Guibert of Nogent wrote that "God has instituted in our times holy wars" so that believers might gain salvation. Yet the nature of the spiritual rewards granted to the first crusaders remains unclear. Some sources mention cancellation of temporal penance, others full remission of sins. (Note: Bishop Lambert of Arras, present at Clermont, wrote that those departing for the Holy Land "could substitute this journey for all penance". Another participant, Robert of Rheims said that Urban had granted the remission of sins to the crusaders, and a third eyewitness, Baldric of Dol, noted the Pope instructed the bishops to absolve only those who had confessed.) Pope Urban referred to remissio peccatorum ('absolution from sins') in one letter, and in another promised absolution of all penance.

Peter Abelard, c. 1130, still sharply criticized grants of indulgence, but most later theologians accepted it. The Fourth Lateran Council codified Crusade indulgences in 1215, declaring that "sins repented by heart and confessed with mouth" would be remitted. The theological basis was clarified with the emergence of the "Treasury of Merit" doctrine, drawing on the merits of Christ and the saints, c. 1230. Occasionally, offenders of particular crimes—such as arsonists, violators of trade embargoes with Muslims, and assailants of clergy—were granted indulgence. Debate over the scope of the indulgence continued, Bonaventure arguing that indulgences did not apply to those dying before fulfilling their vow, and Thomas Aquinas maintaining that penitent crusaders who confessed would attain salvation even if they died before departing.

== Crusaders ==
Crusaders' motives are inherently difficult to determine. Although contemporary sources emphasize religious fervour, secular ambitions also played a role because holding conquests required sustained Western presence. (Note: Robert of Rheims's version of Pope Urban's speech explicitly mentions the prospect of material gains.) Many participants enlisted for pay. Most saw no contradiction between piety and material gain, especially booty, as the Old Testament includes repeated references to spoils seized in divinely sanctioned wars. Some sought fame; others were attracted by the prospect of long-distance travel. Some criminals escaped harsher punishment by joining a crusade. (Note: A notable case is Amanieu of Astarac, a French aristocratic outlaw sentenced in 1323 to two years of military service in Cilician Armenia or Cyprus.) The medievalist Andrew Jotischky suggests figures like the robber baron Thomas of Marle saw crusading as an opportunity for unpunished violence.

=== Knights and aristocrats ===
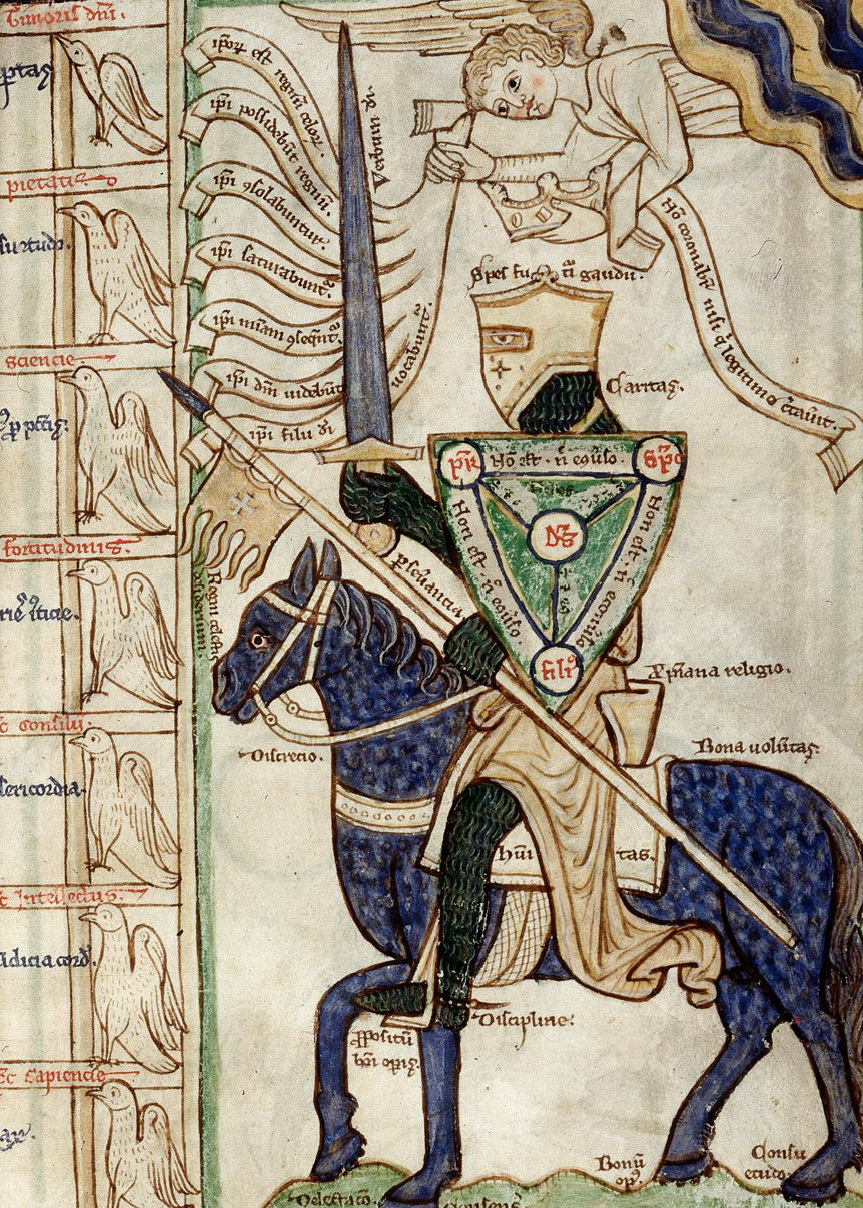
Allegory presenting a knight prepared to fight the seven deadly sins (from the 12th-century Summa Vitiorum ('Summa of Vice') by William Perault)

Pope Urban directed his appeal at Clermont to the country's military elite. By then, the milites—once a broad category—had become a distinct warrior caste, though knighthood would not be fully equated with nobility until the late 12th century. Aristocrats valued visible piety, and crusading offered a new outlet for what Madden calls their "simple and sincere love of God".

The warrior lifestyle entailed habitual sin, yet offered few chances for penance. Barefoot pilgrimages stripped knights of their symbols—arms and warhorses. Urban's message allowed them to maintain their identity without jeopardizing salvation. Crusade rhetoric mirrored their values, invoking vassalage and honour. Preachers cast Christ as a feudal lord, summoning knights to defend his stolen patrimony as milites Christi ('Christ's warriors'). (Note: Originally, miles Christi denoted clergy who wielded spiritual arms in God's service.)

Crusading decisions were often collective, made within noble households led by influential lords. Success brought prestige, and crusading kin could make participation a family tradition. (Note: For instance, three sons of William I, Count of Burgundy joined the First Crusade; one grandson and one granddaughter participated in a crusade in the 1120s; and seven descendants took part in the Second Crusade.) Yet failure meant disgrace or financial ruin. Even in the Late Middle Ages, chivalric ideals fuelled two expeditions: the 1390 Barbary Crusade and the 1396 Crusade of Nicopolis.

=== Clergy ===
Although violence conflicted with their vocation, clerics often joined crusades. At Clermont, Bishop Adhemar of Le Puy was the first to vow the journey to Jerusalem. The Fourth Lateran Council explicitly permitted clerics to join for up to three years without forfeiting their benefices. Secular clergy typically served as chaplains or administrators; senior churchmen often led troops. (Note: Among the first crusading prelates, Archbishop Daimbert of Pisa led a fleet of 120 ships to the Levant in 1099. In the first Northern Crusade, seven bishops led an assault on the town of Demmin.) Influential prelates also helped initiate the Northern Crusades. (Note: Archbishop Eskil of Lund threatened Valdemar I of Denmark with excommunication to compel an attack on the pagans on the island of Rügen, then joined the campaign himself. His successor, Absalon, as the historian Eric Christiansen notes, spent "most of his life in the saddle or on the gangway of his ship".) Despite vows like stabilitas loci ('stability of place'), monks joined too. Cistercians and Premonstratensians even took up arms occasionally, especially in the Baltic. (Note: The Cistercian monk Bern became a missionary bishop to the Abodrites and took part in the 1168 invasion of Rügen.)

=== Patricians ===
Urban elites played a vital role in several crusades. Fleets from Genoa, Pisa, and Venice helped establish and secure the Crusader states, (Note: The Genoese patrician Guglielmo Embriaco joined the crusaders at the siege of Jerusalem in June 1099, while the Venetian Giovanni Michiel helped to capture the city of Haifa in the late summer of 1100.) gaining in return commercial privileges and city quarters. The city of Lübeck supported the conquest of Prussia. Iberian towns owed military service under royal charters—often replaced by a special tax called fonsadera.

Excerpt from the Pactum Warmundi about the Venetians' privileges (1123–24)

In every city ...the Venetians shall have a church and one entire street of their own; also a square and a bath and an oven to be held forever by hereditary right, free from all taxation as is the king's own property.

— William of Tyre, A History of Deeds Done Beyond the Sea

During the Fourth Crusade, Doge Enrico Dandolo convinced fellow leaders to capture Zadar, a Catholic city in Dalmatia, and later advocated the assault on Constantinople. After its sack, Venice gained control of several Aegean islands, establishing patrician-led lordships. (Note: Marco I Sanudo seized Naxos and the nearby islands, establishing the Duchy of the Archipelago.) Marino Sanudo Torsello, a Venetian writer, became a key crusading theorist in the early 14th century.

=== Commoners ===
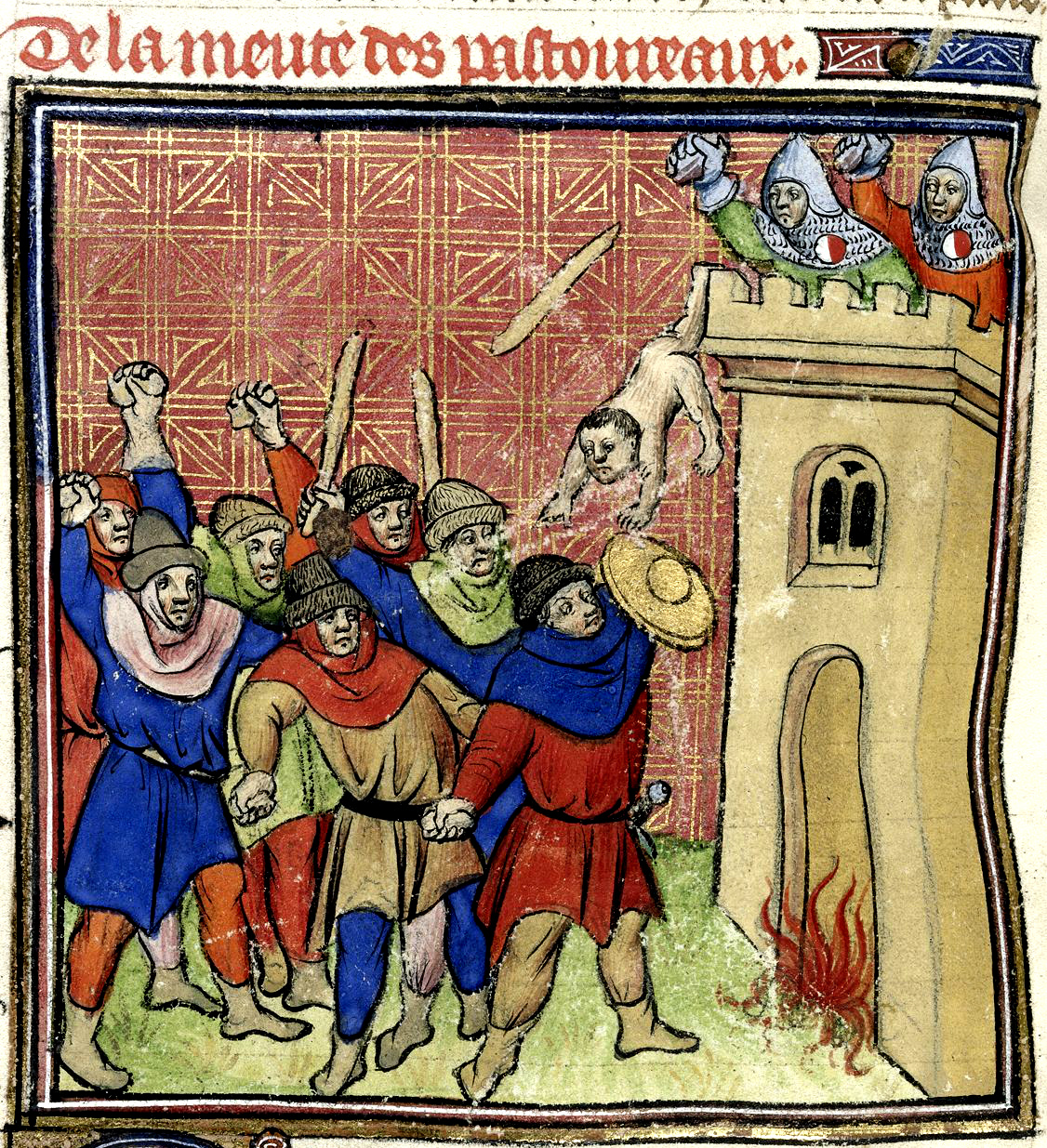
Shepherds attack a fortress during the 1320 Shepherds' Crusade (a miniature from the late 14th-century Chroniques de France ou de St-Denis).

The historian Christopher Tyerman observes that crusading was "as much as a phenomenon of artisans as of knights, of carpentry as much as of castle". Commoners filled essential roles in Crusader armies as foot soldiers, sailors, archers, engineers, and squires. They were typically young men of modest means who joined for pay.

Following Clermont, Pope Urban barred clergy from accepting vows from those unable to fight and annulled existing ones. Nonetheless, the People's Crusade consisted almost entirely of unarmed commoners, inspired by charismatics like Peter the Hermit. In the First Crusade's noble-led armies, the number of non-combatants nearly matched the number of fighters. The historian Conor Kostick describes them as "a slice of European society on the march". Chroniclers like Raymond of Aguilers called common crusaders as pauperes ('the poor or defenceless') and saw their presence as vital for divine favour. Unlike nobles, captured commoners were often tormented or killed rather than ransomed.

The People's Crusade and subsequent mass movements inspired by grassroots crusading zeal are collectively known as popular crusades. These included the 1212 Children's Crusade, led by two charismatic boys; (Note: Contemporary sources called the participants as pueri ('children'), giving the movement its name.) the 1251 and 1320 Shepherds' Crusades, the former sparked by a letter allegedly from the Virgin Mary; and the 1309 Crusade of the Poor. None reached the Holy Land, and both Shepherds' Crusades were forcibly disbanded. In 1456, a peasant Crusader army helped repel the Ottomans at the Siege of Belgrade. This success encouraged future efforts to mobilize peasants in anti-Ottoman crusades, but in 1514 a crusading peasant army in Hungary turned on their lords.

== Enemies and contacts ==
Except for the Mongols, the crusaders confronted familiar enemies, portrayed as aggressors and thus furnishing a just cause for war. Conquest and colonisation produced multi-ethnic societies. In Iberia and the Crusader states, relations with native populations broadly followed the pre-conquest dhimmi model, relegating non-Catholic ethno-religious groups to second-class status.

=== Muslims ===
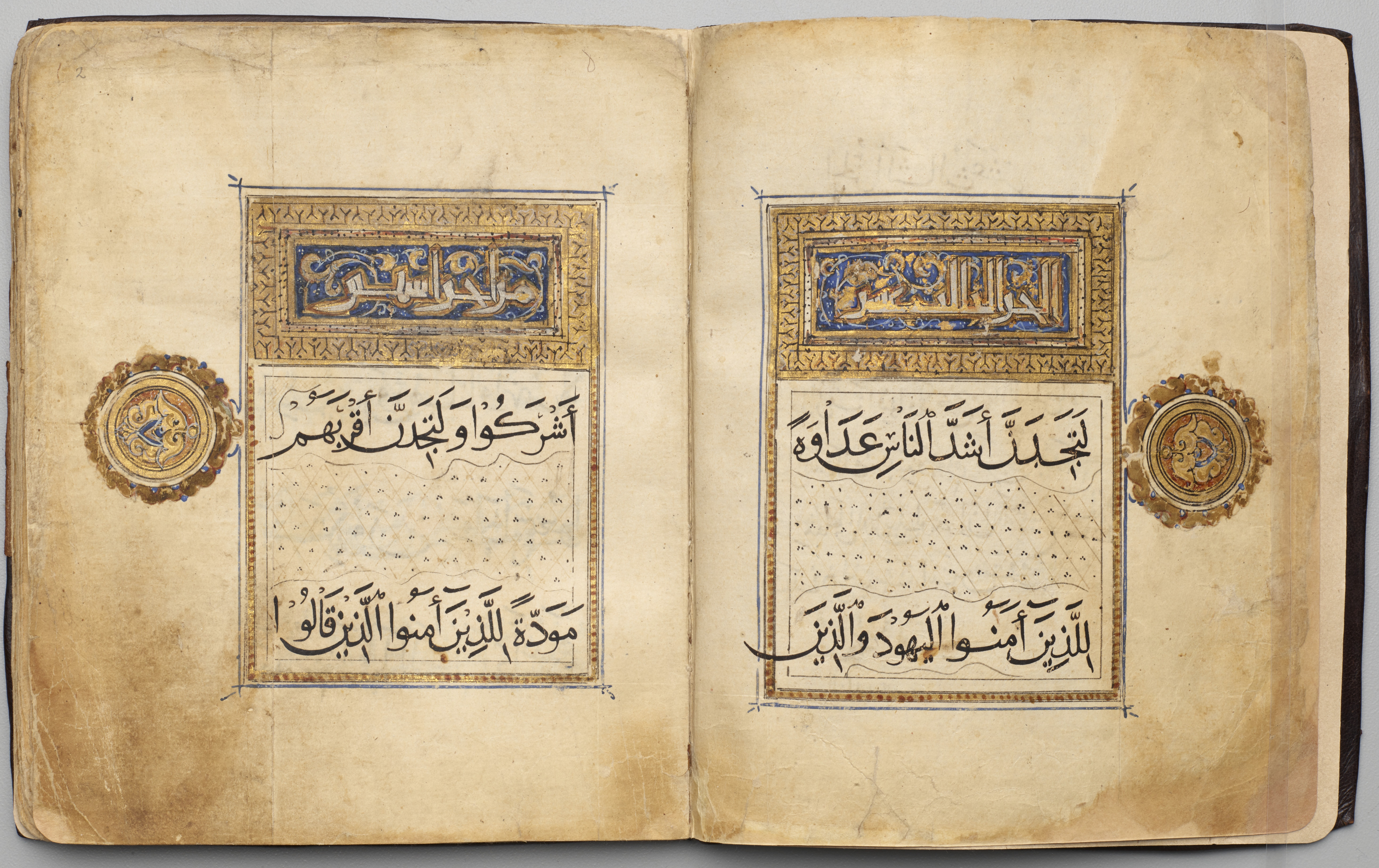
A double page from a 12th-century manuscript of the Quran, placed in the madrasa of Nur al-Din in Damascus

Muslim legal experts divided the world into Dar al-Islam (the Muslim world) and Dar al-harb (non-Muslim lands). Border regions like Syria and Iberia became jihad battlegrounds, attracting military volunteers—mujahideen and ghazis—from across Dar al-Islam. Accounts of relations between Christians—both pilgrims and natives—and Muslims at all levels, from the authorities to ordinary locals, in the Holy Land on the eve of the Crusades vary. (Note: The contemporary Muslim scholar Abu Bakr ibn al-Arabi did not mention anti-Christian violence, but the 12th-century historian al-Azimi reported that the "people of the Syrian ports" had obstructed Christian pilgrims from reaching Jerusalem. The chronicler Matthew of Edessa gave a detailed account of the enslavement of Armenians and the destruction of their churches by raiding Turkomans, yet he also praised the Seljuk sultan Malik-Shah I for showing "a fatherly affection for all the inhabitants of the lands".) Sporadic attacks on pilgrims likely shaped perceptions of danger, though Asbridge highlights that interfaith violence mirrored broader political and social turmoil.

Western Christians often mislabelled Muslims as idol-worshippers or heretics. (Note: An early example is the popular epic Song of Roland (c. 1100), which depicts the "Saracens" as a treacherous people worshipping three gods and idols.) Until c. 1110, massacres of Muslims in conquered towns were common. (Note: One of the earliest examples of mass violence was the massacre of civilians in Ma'arra, followed by the crusaders' wholesale slaughter of Muslims in Jerusalem after its capture.) Violence was presented as a response to the Muslim occupation of the holy places and the oppression of Christians.

Later, crusaders rarely sought conversions, instead levying a poll tax akin to the jizya. Church law imposed restrictions on Muslims, though enforcement is poorly documented. (Note: In 1120, the Council of Nablus issued decrees mandating the castration of Muslim men who had relations with Christian woman, and the mutilation, specifically the cutting of the nose, of Christian women who had slept with Muslim men.) In the Crusader states, most Muslims—Arabic-speaking farmers—lived in self-governed communities under Islamic law. In Iberia, mudejares—Muslims under Christian rule—also faced second-class status.

Initially, few Muslims perceived the Crusades' religious character, and longstanding conflicts among Muslim rulers persisted. The Damascene scholar al-Sulami was the first to situate them within broader "Frankish", or Westerner, expansion. He interpreted their success as divine punishment for neglecting jihad. Zengi was among the era's first Muslim leaders receiving jihadist honours. Later rulers likewise invoked religious motives in anti-Frankish campaigns. In Iberia, the Almoravids and the Almohads strongly supported jihad. Nonetheless, pragmatic Christian–Muslim alliances remained common throughout the period. (Note: Viewing the jihadist efforts of the Seljuq sultan Muhammad as a strategy to extend his dominion, the Muslim rulers of Aleppo and Damascus allied with the Franks of Antioch and Jerusalem to repel a Seljuk invasion in 1115. In 1196, Alfonso IX of León invaded Castile in collaboration with the Almohads, prompting Pope Celestine III to grant crusade indulgence to those who would take up arms against him.)

=== Eastern Christians ===
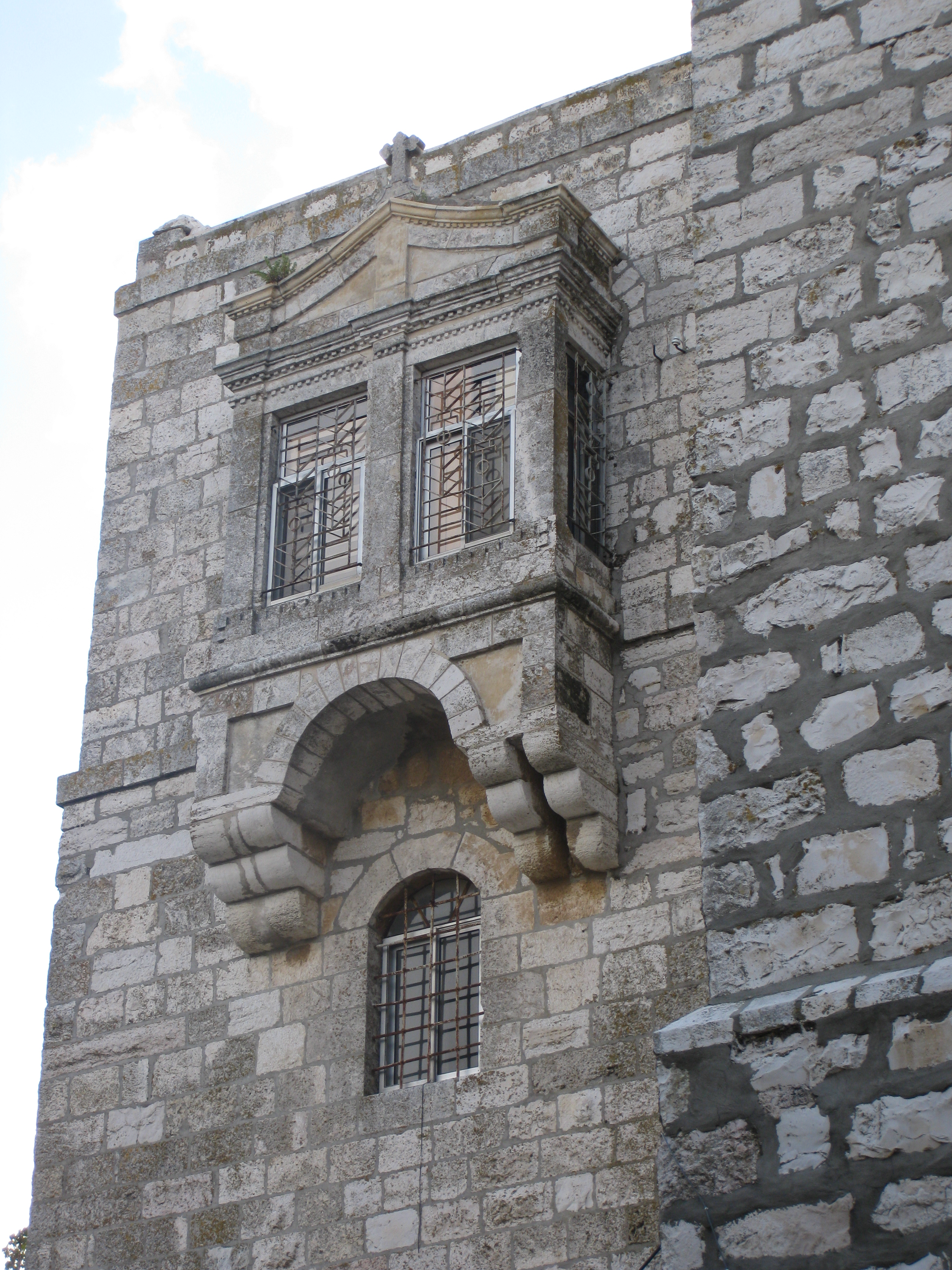
Detail of the Greek Orthodox Mar Elias Monastery near Bethlehem. Its restoration was financed by the Byzantine emperor Manuel I Komnenus during the Crusading period.

The liberation of eastern Christians was proclaimed a central aim of the First Crusade, yet early encounters proved disappointing. Emperor Alexios, expecting disciplined mercenaries or manageable allies, was unsettled by the crusaders' influx. He secured oaths for the return of reconquered Byzantine lands, but Bohemond retained Antioch, a former Byzantine provincial capital. Soon after Antioch's capture, Crusader leaders described local Christians as "heretics" in a letter to Pope Urban. In the Crusader states, Eastern Christians paid a poll tax, signalling their subordinate status, although their self-governance was reinforced and some retained considerable landholdings.

Orthodox Christians, or Melkites, formed the majority of Palestine's native Christian population and were also prominent in northern Syria. Catholic theologians regarded them as schismatics rather than heretics. Although most Orthodox bishops had fled Palestine before 1099, scattered references suggest the presence of an Orthodox hierarchy under Frankish rule. (Note: A notable example is Meletos, the Orthodox bishop of Gaza, who retained his position after the city fell to the Franks in 1149. The historian Christopher MacEvitt attributes this to the Templars, Gaza's new rulers, noting that appointing a Catholic bishop might have provoked disputes over tithes and properties.) Monasticism experienced a revival under Byzantine patronage.

Certain Eastern Christian communities were treated as heretics for rejecting the Council of Chalcedon, whose teaching on Christ's two natures (divine and human) was central to both Catholic and Orthodox theology. Among them, the Armenians—concentrated in northern Syria and Cilicia—maintained autonomous lordships. Many welcomed the crusaders, and Armenian aristocrats formed marriage alliances with them. This cooperation led to a tenuous church union with Rome (1198) and ultimately to the Frankish Lusignans' rule over Cilician Armenia. Syriac (or Jacobite) Christians, mainly rural and Arabic-speaking, were viewed with suspicion and condescension; yet the Jacobite patriarch Michael the Syrian praised Frankish religious tolerance contrasting it with Byzantine policy. Another distinct group, the Maronites of Mount Lebanon, entered into communion with Rome, forming the first Eastern Rite Catholic Church in 1181.

Byzantine–Frankish relations were variable. Following the Fourth Crusade, Byzantine successor states like Epirus and Nicaea led resistance against the conquerors, although temporary Greek–Frankish alliances were not uncommon. (Note: To secure an alliance against Nicaea, the Epirote ruler Michael II Komnenos Doukas married his daughter Anna to William of Villehardouin, the Frankish prince of Achaea in 1259.) In Frankish Greece, many Greek árchontes (aristocrats) retained lands and fought alongside Franks. Peasants suffered harsher conditions than under Byzantine rule. Orthodox bishops refusing papal supremacy were replaced by Catholic appointees, but Greek monasteries received papal protection. Latin conquest reinforced Orthodox identity, and persistent local resistance ultimately thwarted attempts to church reunification. (Note: The final Byzantine emperors, John VIII and Constantine XI Palaiologos, endorsed the church union established at the Council of Florence in 1439, hoping it would secure Western aid against the Ottomans. However, they were unable to overcome the entrenched opposition of the Byzantine clergy and laity.)

In northeastern Europe, Catholic and Orthodox churches coexisted in major trade centres, and the schism did not impede dynastic intermarriage. Catholic missionary activity only intensified after the Fourth Crusade. Despite occasional alliances between crusaders and Rus' leaders, lasting control over Rus' lands was never achieved.

=== Pagans ===
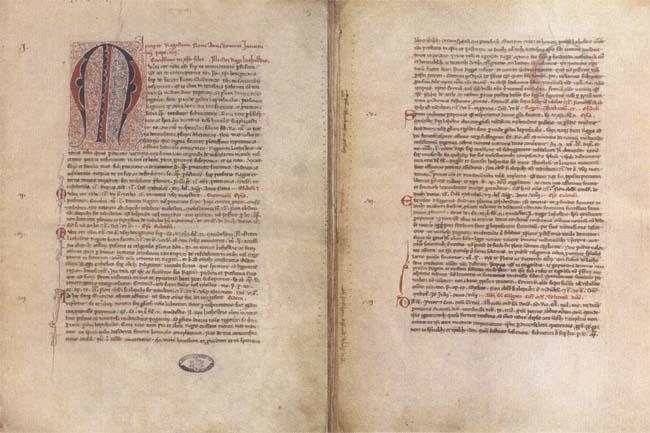
Pope Innocent IV's papal bull about the baptism and coronation of the Lithuanian ruler Mindaugas

Trade in raw materials and slaves had long connected Christian and pagan communities in the Baltic region, although rivalry over trade routes often sparked armed conflict. From c. 1100, intensified German colonisation and unequal access to resources triggered more frequent clashes between the Wends and their Christian neighbours. In 1146, while promoting the Second Crusade, the Cistercian abbot Bernard of Clairvaux encountered Saxon reluctance to abandon anti-Wendish campaigns. Adopting their perspective, he convinced Pope Eugenius III to proclaim the Wendish Crusade. The Wends' structured society—with principalities, towns, and a priestly hierarchy—eased their eventual integration into Christendom. (Note: The Wendish ruler Nyklot was the primary target of the 1147 Crusade. His son, Pribislav became the first Christian prince of Mecklenburg in 1160. Pribislav's son, Henry Borwin I, joined a crusade in the eastern Baltic in 1218, and his grandson Henry I was captured by Muslim forces during a pilgrimage to the Holy Land.)

Further east, the Old Prussians, Latvians, and Curonians had long resisted Christianisation. They lived in rural communities led by strongmen who thrived on trade and raiding. Crusaders employed coercion, bribery, and promises of protection to gain converts among them. Papal legates sought to protect the converts from exploitation but achieved little. (Note: Under the 1249 Treaty of Christburg, concluded between the papal legate Jacques Pantaléon and the Teutonic Knights, Christian native lords were formally granted the same rights as their German and Polish counterparts. However, following the Prussian uprisings of 1259 and 1263, the Knights limited these privileges to only the most loyal members of the native aristocracy.)

The Lithuanians, largely taxpaying peasants under native lords, unified in the 13th century under Grand Prince Mindaugas. Baptized in 1253, he received a royal crown from Pope Innocent IV but later reverted to paganism. In 1386, Grand Prince Jogaila married Queen Jadwiga of Poland. The subsequent mass conversion of Lithuanians to Catholicism eroded the Teutonic Knights' justification for crusade. In 1410, Polish-Lithuanian forces decisively defeated the Knights in the Battle of Grunwald. The Preussenreise waned, and the last non-German crusaders entered the Baltic in 1413.

In the eastern Baltic, Finnic peoples lived in small rural communities, sustained by farming, slave-raiding, and fur-hunting. Legend has it that Eric IX of Sweden led a crusade to Finland in the 1150s, but the earliest confirmed expedition was authorized by Pope Gregory IX in 1237. Danish crusaders conquered Estonia in 1219, but by mid-century, German knights and burghers dominated the region's politics.

=== Western dissidents ===
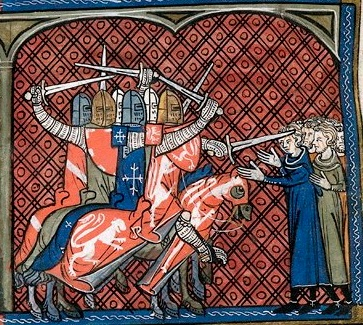
Crusaders massacre Cathars at the beginning of the Albigensian Crusades (a miniature from the late 14th-century Chroniques de France ou de St-Denis).

The Gregorian Reform did not satisfy those seeking a purer, simpler Christianity. Increased trade carried dualist ideologies westward, distinguishing between an incorruptible God and an evil creator of the material world. In Western Europe, their adherents became known as Cathars or Albigensians. As Catholic churchmen saw heresy as a fundamental threat to the faith and to salvation, the Third Lateran Council granted indulgences, in 1179, to those who fought heretics. Yet, in southern France, Cathars were deeply embedded in Occitan society, and local elites were unwilling to act against heretical friends or kin.

In 1207, Pope Innocent III urged Raymond VI, Count of Toulouse, to eradicate heresy. His reluctance or inability to comply led to excommunication by the papal legate Peter of Castelnau, who was soon murdered. In response, Innocent declared the first Albigensian Crusade. Northern French crusaders invaded Occitania, committing atrocities against both Cathars and Catholics. (Note: The crusade theorist Caesarius of Heisterbach claimed that the Cistercian abbot Arnaud Amalric had urged the crusaders to kill everybody, stating that "The Lord knows who are his own" during the Massacre at Béziers. In the same town, prelates called the slaughter of c. 20,000 people as a miracle.) Though the campaigns strengthened French influence, they failed to eliminate heresy. That was eventually achieved by mendicant friars, inquisitors and secular authorities.

The Stedinger Crusade in northern Germany targeted peasants accused of heresy for refusing to pay the tithe (church tax). Hungarian rulers led two failed crusades into Bosnia, allegedly home to a Cathar antipope. The radical Apostolici in northern Italy were swiftly crushed by crusading forces.

=== Mongols ===
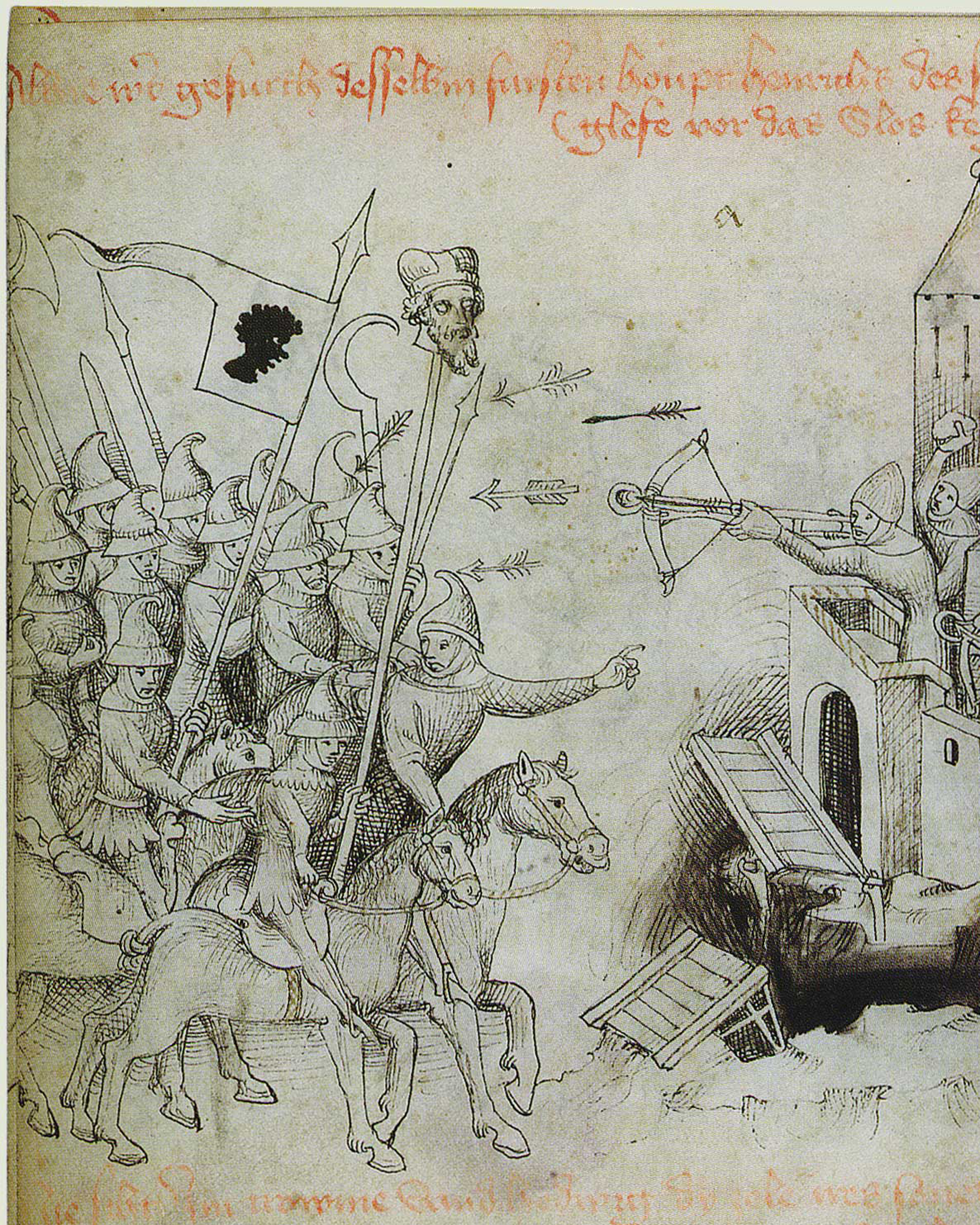
Mongols displaying the severed head of the Silesian prince Henry the Pious after the Battle of Legnica (from a mid-15th-century Legend of his mother St Hedwig)

In 1206, Temüjin was proclaimed Genghis Khan, uniting the Mongol tribes under the belief in a divine destiny to conquer the world. Western Europeans first learned of the earliest Mongol conquests during the Fifth Crusade. As some tribes followed the Eastern Syriac (Nestorian) Church, the Mongols came to be linked in Western thought to the people of the mythical Christian ruler Prester John, prompting hopes of an anti-Muslim alliance. The Mongol invasion of Eastern and Central Europe in 1239–42 shocked Western Christendom. Although Pope Gregory IX called for a crusade, the Mongols withdrew from Europe following the death of Ögedei Khan, Genghis's successor, in 1242.

In the Middle East, Mongol forces sacked Baghdad and destroyed the Abbasid Caliphate in 1258. Seeking protection, Hethum I of Cilician Armenia and Bohemond VI of Antioch submitted to Hulegu, the Mongol il khan (ruler of the Middle East). The Ilkhanate's expansion ended in 1260 when Mamluk forces defeated Hulegu's army in the Battle of Ain Jalut.

=== Jews ===
Late Roman legislation and Christian theology shaped Western attitudes to Judaism. It remained legally recognised, yet its adherents faced restrictions and were seen as divinely preserved but punished with dispersion for rejecting Jesus. Jewish migration to Western Europe coincided with the pre-Crusade economic boom. Coming from developed Islamic economies, Jewish merchants brought advanced commercial expertise. Free from canon law's anti-usury rules, they came to dominate moneylending, fuelling antisemitism. Local rulers valued Jewish economic contributions and offered protection, though often fragile.

Organized pogroms began in the Rhineland during the First Crusade, reportedly driven by vengeance for Christ's death and desire for Jewish property. In Jerusalem, crusaders massacred Jews, though communities in other towns—such as Tyre and Ascalon—survived. Jewish pilgrimage to the Holy Land intensified; hundreds of western Jews settled there during the Crusades era. Although Pope Calixtus II's bull Sicut Iudeis forbade violence against Jews, crusade preaching repeatedly incited antisemitic pogroms.

== Women ==
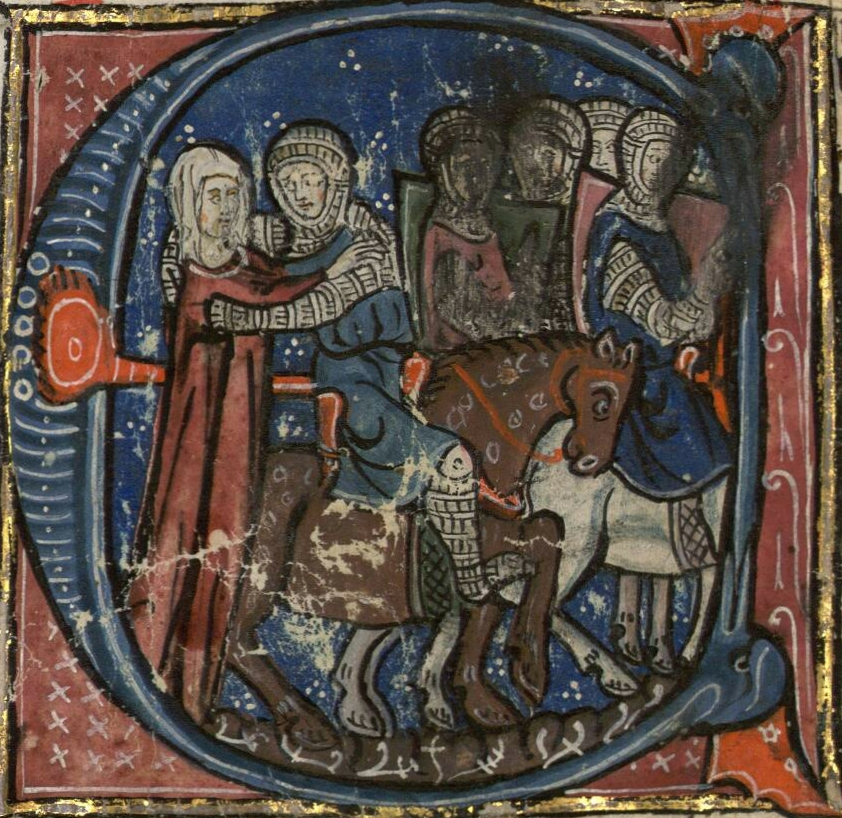
Ida of Lorraine's farewell to her sons Godfrey and Baldwin of Boulogne departing for the First Crusade (a miniature from a 13th-century manuscript of the Roman d'Alexandre)

Women were involved in the crusading movement from the outset. Though popes discouraged female participation, women always accompanied the armies as servants. Washerwomen received special papal approval early on. Women needed permission from a father or husband to join a crusade, whereas men, from 1209, could go without their wives' consent.

Gender bias prevailed on all sides. Christian chroniclers highlighted women's supportive roles—delivering water or stone missiles—but rarely mentioned female fighters. Muslim and Byzantine writers often depicted armed Crusader women as symbols of barbarity. Muslim sources also condemned the freedoms women enjoyed in Frankish societies. Crusaders were expected to abstain from sex; and women, both wives and sex-workers, were often expelled before major battles. Occasionally, high-ranking women led troops or conducted key diplomatic negotiations. (Note: The widowed Austrian margravine Ida commanded her own army, and disappeared in the Battle of Heraclea in 1101. In Iberia, Ermengarde of Narbonne led a contingent during the siege of Tortosa in 1148. During the Seventh Crusade, Margaret of Provence led the negotiations about the ransom of her husband Louis IX of France with the Egyptian sultana Shajar al-Durr.)

Women left behind were vulnerable to abuse by kin or neighbours. (Note: The wife of the English crusader William Trussel was murdered and her body was profaned shortly after he had left for the Third Crusade. The only daughter of an other English crusader Ralph Hodeng married to one of his tenants during his absence.) Some crusaders made formal arrangements with relatives or religious institutions to protect their wives and daughters; others entrusted wives or mothers with managing their estates. (Note: In France, female regency was quite common: both Philip II and Louis IX appointed their mothers—Adela of Champagne and Blanche of Castile, respectively—to rule during their absence. On the other hand, Louis charged two men Simon of Nesle and Matthew of Vendôme to govern his kingdom during his second crusade instead of his wife, Margaret of Provence.) Raids by both Christian and Muslim forces frequently targeted women. After battles or sieges, victors often captured enemy women and children. The First Crusade was exceptional: crusaders often massacred entire populations of captured towns. In the Baltic, the Livonian Rhymed Chronicle praised the slaughter of pagan women and children as divinely sanctioned. Rape of captured women both by crusaders and their enemies was common. Noblewomen were typically ransomed, albeit for less than men of the same rank; other women were enslaved or forced into marriage.

High male mortality in the Crusader states meant that women often inherited fiefs, though they were expected to marry. Some inherited thrones: between 1186 and 1228, for example, four queens ruled Jerusalem. (Note: Sibylla (r. 1186–1190), her sister Isabella I (r. 1192–1205), Isabella's daughter Maria (r. 1205–1212), and Maria's daughter Isabella II (r. 1212–1228).) In Frankish Greece, the wives of Achaean barons captured at the Battle of Pelagonia formed the "Parliament of Dames" in 1261 to negotiate peace with the Byzantines.

== Crusading in practice ==
Tyerman notes that crusading "paraded across society in recruitment, funding and social rituals of support". The movement was accompanied by processions, priestly blessings, charity, and was also commemorated in works of art.

=== Declaration and promotion ===
Crusades were typically proclaimed by the pope in his capacity as Vicar of Christ. Crusade bulls articulated the aims, urged participation, and detailed spiritual and temporal rewards; (Note: The 1145 papal bull Quantum praedecessores provided the template for subsequent encyclicals.) they were read in all Catholic churches from Pope Alexander III's time. Pope Gregory IX authorized the Dominicans to preach Baltic crusades without further approval, a privilege later extended to the Franciscans and Teutonic clergy.

Excerpts from the papal bull proclaiming the Third Crusade (1187)

We have heard and tremble at the severity of the judgment that the Divine hand has executed over the land of Jerusalem. ... Because of some disagreement that came about in that country through human malice from diabolical instigation, Saladin entered that area with a great many armed men ..., and our side was overcome, the Lord's Cross was captured...

— Pope Gregory VIII, Audita tremendi

Crusades were promoted by clerics. Papal legates addressed nobles at major assemblies. Village and town preaching was unstructured until Pope Innocent III coordinated propaganda through local committees, though subsequent popes preferred less formal methods. From the early 13th century, mendicant friars assumed responsibility for preaching. By the century's end, many used manuals by propagandists like Humbert of Romans. Crusade-promotional sermons often began with moral anecdotes.

=== Taking the cross ===
Crusaders took public vows, usually followed by a ceremony where a cloth or silk cross—typically red—was sewn onto their cloak. By "taking the cross", they pledged themselves to Christ's call in the Gospel of Matthew: "If any man will come after me, let him … take up his cross and follow me". The ceremony resonated with the 11th-century imitatio Christi ('imitation of Christ') spiritual movement, which encouraged believers to follow Christ's example by serving others. Pilgrim emblems like a staff and a pouch were often also distributed. The cross had to be worn by crusaders until their return; premature removal was sanctioned by church authorities, (Note: The excommunication of Emperor Frederick II serves as a telling example. In 1227, he embarked on a crusade, but an outbreak forced him to return. Nevertheless, Pope Gregory IX excommunicated him for failing to fulfil his vow. Jotischky argues that Frederick's efforts to consolidate his authority over the Church in Sicily may have been the true cause of his excommunication.) with rare exceptions like illness, poverty, or incapacity. By the late 12th century, crusaders were widely known as crucesignati ('signed with the cross').

=== Privileges ===
As penitents and armed pilgrims, crusaders were classed in canon law as provisional clerics under ecclesiastical jurisdiction. Their early secular privileges are poorly documented. According to a collection of canon law, First Crusaders and their goods were "under the Truce of God". Guibert of Nogent notes that Pope Urban offered protection to crusaders and their households, with excommunication prescribed for offenders. This legal approach was still described as "new" in 1107 by the canonist Ivo of Chartres, who was reluctant to adjudicate a case concerning the capture of a crusader's fortification. (Note: Pope Paschal II had instructed Ivo to excommunicate the French nobleman Rotrou III, Count of Perche for constructing a fort on the land belonging to the crusader Hugh II of Le Puiset. Ivo hesitated, stating he did not "wish to punish, like some assassin, without a hearing".) The First Lateran Council formalized it, protecting the crusaders' "houses and households" and ordering latae sententiae or automatic excommunication for infractions, but enforcement was inconsistent. Pope Eugenius III also suspended lawsuits against crusaders and interest payment on their debts, and authorised them to sell land—including fiefs—without the consent of family members or lords.

=== Finances ===
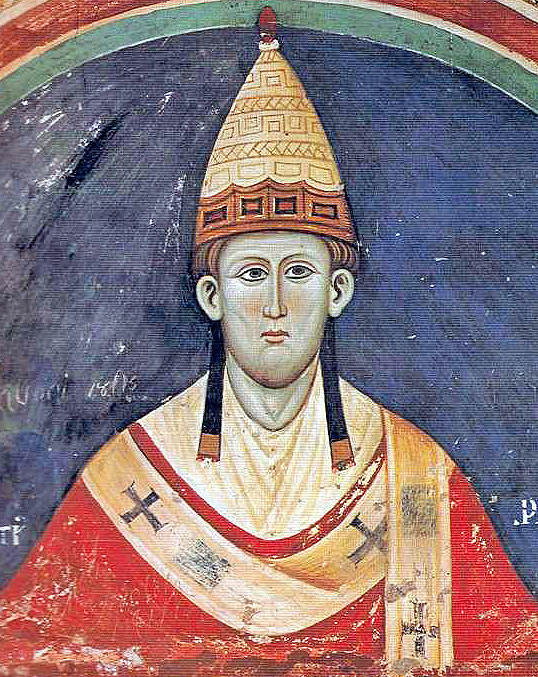
Pope Innocent III: by sanctioning the redemption of crusading vows for cash, he created a massive new source of income for crusading (a fresco in St. Benedict's Cave at the Subiaco Abbey, c. 1219).

The historian Simon Lloyd notes that crusading was "cripplingly expensive". Although precise figures are mainly lacking, (Note: The first crusade of Louis IX of France stands out as a notable exception: between 1248 and 1254, he spent 1,537,570 livres tournois—over 600 percent of his average annual income—on his campaigns in the Levant. As well as financing his own expedition, he supported his companions through gifts and loans, leading Lloyd to estimate Louis's total expenditure at c. 3,000,000 livres. Yet even this substantial sum excludes expenses incurred by other crusaders who joined his campaign.) estimates suggest that a knight spent over four years' income. Aristocrats sold commodities or granted civic privileges for cash. (Note: Before departing on his crusade in 1236, Earl Richard of Cornwall ordered entire woodlands to be felled to sell timber. In 1202, Hugh IV, Count of Saint-Pol, granted urban privileges to three or four settlements within his domains.) Inherited lands were often mortgaged or pledged via vifgage, allowing creditors repayment from property income. Others secured funds through gifts or loans from kin or lords. (Note: For instance, Duke Robert Curthose pledged Normandy to his brother, William Rufus, King of England, as a security for a loan of 10,000 marks in 1096.) In Iberia, parias (tributes from Muslim rulers) helped fund Christian forces.

An extraordinary tax for Holy Land defence was first introduced in France and England in 1166. The 1188 "Saladin tithe" imposed a ten percent levy on income and property, though compliance varied. In 1199, Pope Innocent III ordered church revenues taxed for crusading. Pope Gregory X defined collection procedures in 1274, but clergy often resisted.

From 1199, donations were gathered via church chests. In 1213, Innocent III introduced a new mechanism, allowing anyone—except monks—to vow a crusade and redeem it financially. This practice of purchasing indulgences continued into the early modern period. (Note: In Germany, an indulgence cost roughly the equivalent of a household's weekly expenses c. 1500.) With the spread of printing in the mid-15th century, indulgence sheets were mass-produced with blanks for beneficiaries' names.

== Warfare ==
The historian Peter Lock notes that mounting "a crusade was no easy task and the time given for preparation was often short". The gathering of pack animals, wagons, war horses, and supplies, like fodder and water, was essential in individual crusades' success, but is poorly documented in contemporary sources.

=== Command, strategy and troops ===
Command during most crusades was divided and uncertain, with desertion common. Morale was often sustained by visions, processions, and relics. (Note: Between 1099 and 1187, the Jerusalemite army carried the True Cross—a relic linked to Christ's crucifixion—into 31 battles.) Most crusaders lacked experience in urban sieges, which were typical of Levantine and Iberian warfare. Crusaders generally avoided pitched battles in which defeat risked catastrophic losses. (Note: The Franks suffered catastrophic defeats at Harran (1104), on the Field of Blood (1119), and at Harim (1164) in Syria, and at Pelagonia (1259) and at Halmyros (1311) in Frankish Greece. In the north, the Lithuanians' victory over the Sword Brothers at Saule annihilated the Brothers' power.) Siege warfare used trebuchets, towers, and battering rams. Muslim defenders employed Greek fire, countered by crusaders with vinegar-soaked hides. From the late 13th century, strategic planning for Holy Land campaigns distinguished between an initial campaign (passagium particulare) to secure a foothold and the full-scale passagium generale.

Heavily armoured knights formed the Crusader armies' backbone. The historian John France calls them the "masters of close-quarter warfare". In the east, they primarily confronted mounted archers and relied on infantry, particularly bowmen and spearmen, for support. Franks also employed native light cavalry, or Turcopoles, to harass enemy troops. In the north, Teutonic Knights deployed converted Prussians for raids on pagan settlements. Spanish almogavars—agile raiders—fought with daggers, short lances, and darts.

Naval support came mainly from Italian city-states and the Byzantines in the Levant. Egypt maintained the sole Muslim fleet in the region, but its small vessels posed little threat to Western dominance. After Emperor Frederick I's failed overland expedition, major Levantine crusades were conducted by sea. In the north, large Christian merchant ships, carrying up to 500 people, easily outmatched Baltic long-ships and raiding vessels.

=== Military architecture ===
Throughout conquered territories, castles served military and administrative functions, merging Western and local designs. In the Levant, early Norman-style towers gave way to the local castra layout of walled courtyards, which evolved into concentric castles with layered defences. (Note: Montreal Castle, built in 1115, represents the earliest instance of the Franks adapting the local castra form. The concentric castle design was implemented later, with the construction of Belvoir Castle in 1168.) Spur castles on rocky hills, with towers and a keep, represent—according to the historian Jonathan Phillips—"the most spectacular examples of Frankish military architecture". (Note: Saone Castle in the Principality of Antioch, Kerak Castle in the Kingdom of Jerusalem, and Crac des Chevaliers in the County of Tripoli are among the best known examples of spur castles.) In Iberia, over 2,000 castles were raised along frontiers. The Teutonic Knights first built timber blockhouses in the Baltic, but by c. 1250 switched to stone, then brick for its availability and lower cost.

=== Military orders ===
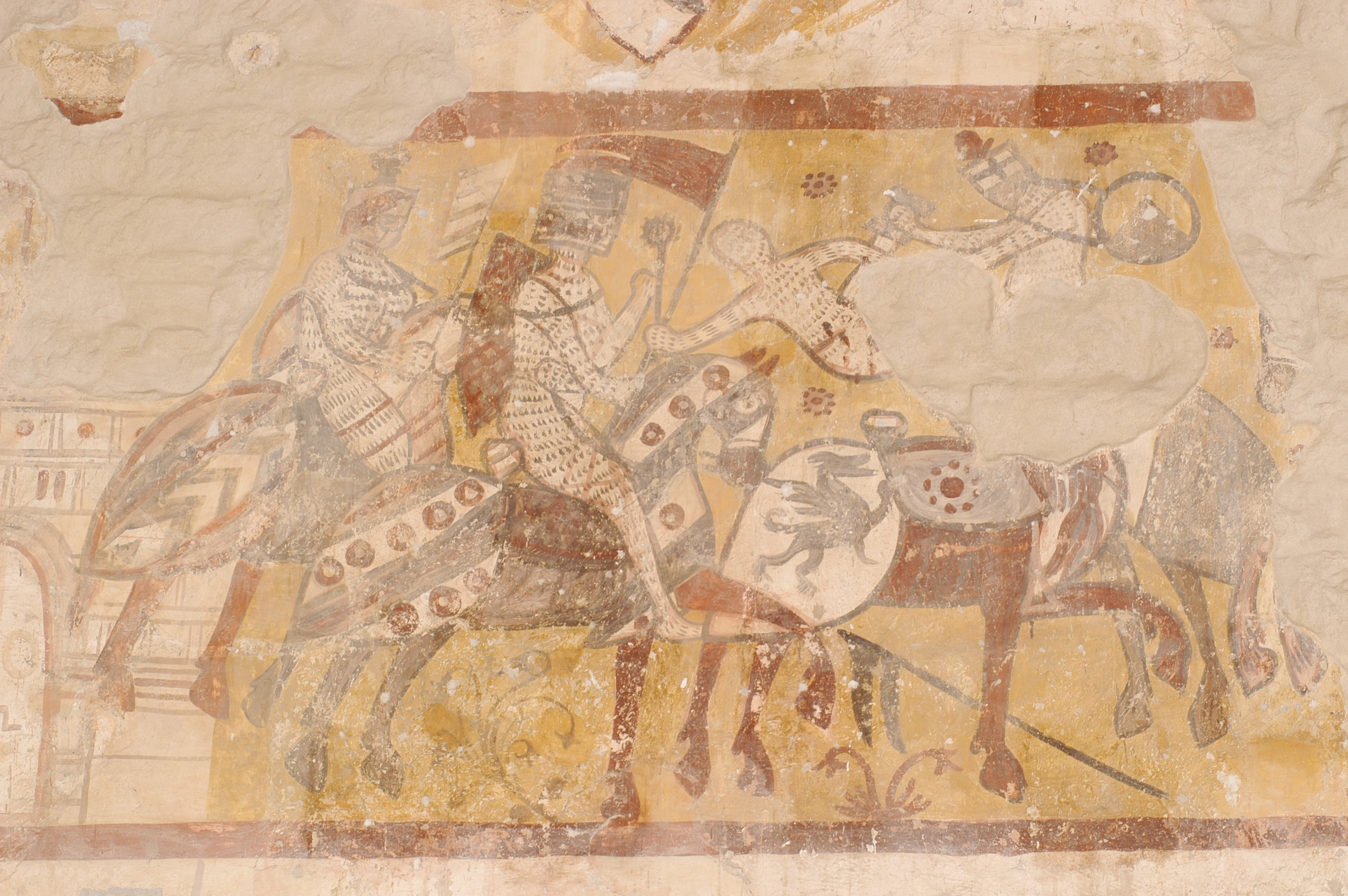
Templars battling Muslim warriors (late 13th-century fresco from San Bevignate)

Tyerman argues that the military orders were "crusading's most original contribution to the institutions of medieval Christendom". These religious communities followed monastic rules but were committed to armed defence of Christianity. The first emerged when the French noble Hugues de Payens and fellow knights pledged to protect pilgrims in the Holy Land. Taking the monastic vows of chastity, poverty, and obedience in 1119, they formed a confraternity. They became known as the Knights Templar after their headquarters in the former Al-Aqsa Mosque, associated with the Temple of Solomon.

The idea of warrior-monks aligned with contemporary chivalric and ecclesiastical ideals. By c. 1130, Bernard of Clairvaux praised the Templars as a "new knighthood". Their model inspired other groups, especially in borderlands of Latin Christianity. In the Holy Land, nursing confraternities became militarized, giving rise to orders such as the Knights Hospitaller, and the Teutonic Knights. In Iberia, royal patronage supported orders, such as Calatrava, and Aviz. In the Baltic, bishops founded the Sword Brothers and the Order of Dobrzyń, both later absorbed by the Teutonic Order.

Military orders were structured by function: knight-brothers and servientes (military servants) fought; priest-brothers provided spiritual care; nobles could temporarily join for spiritual rewards. The Templars and Hospitallers grew into transnational institutions, led by elected grand masters and owning estates throughout Western Christendom. Their convent networks facilitated the flow of goods and cash.

The orders were occasionally criticized for greed, pride, or adopting non-Christian customs. After the Crusader states fell, criticism increased because many orders lost their justification for existence. The Templars, focused solely on fighting, faced intense scrutiny. In 1307, Philip IV of France ordered their mass arrest on charges of apostasy, idolatry, and sodomy. Despite the lack of physical evidence, the Order was dissolved at the Council of Vienne in 1312. The Hospitallers endured but shifted focus to naval defence in the Mediterranean. In Iberia, the military orders gradually secularized, aligning with the crown of Spain and Portugal. The Teutonic Knights survived the Reformation under Habsburg leadership in Germany.

== New states ==
The crusading movement fostered the creation of new states on the fringes of Latin Christendom. The historian Robert Bartlett describes them as "autonomous replicas, not dependencies, of western and central European polities".

=== Crusader states and Cyprus ===
Crusader states, c. 1135

The four Crusader states established Catholic rule in the Levant and strengthened commercial links between the region and Catholic Europe. Their limited economic surpluses were directed chiefly towards military needs. Edessa, the weakest, fell to Zengi after a failed attempt to ally with his Muslim rivals, the Artuqids. Internal strife undermined Jerusalem, leaving it vulnerable to Saladin's conquest, though the Third Crusade regained much of the coast. Antioch and Tripoli were united after a succession war. After Frederick II's crusade, the kings of Jerusalem were mostly absent, and the kingdom was ruled by regents, sometimes appointed by their opponents. By the Mamluk advance, the Crusader states had fragmented into competing lordships and communes.

Cyprus, a day's sail from Syria, was a vital crusading base. From 1269, its Lusignan kings claimed Jerusalem, although the Sicilian Angevins contested this from 1277. The Black Death and shifting trade routes led to decline c. 1350. A Cypriot Crusade on Alexandria provoked Genoese reprisals, leading to the sack of the main port of Cyprus, Famagusta. After the Lusignan dynasty ended in 1474, the island passed to Venice.

=== Frankish Greece ===
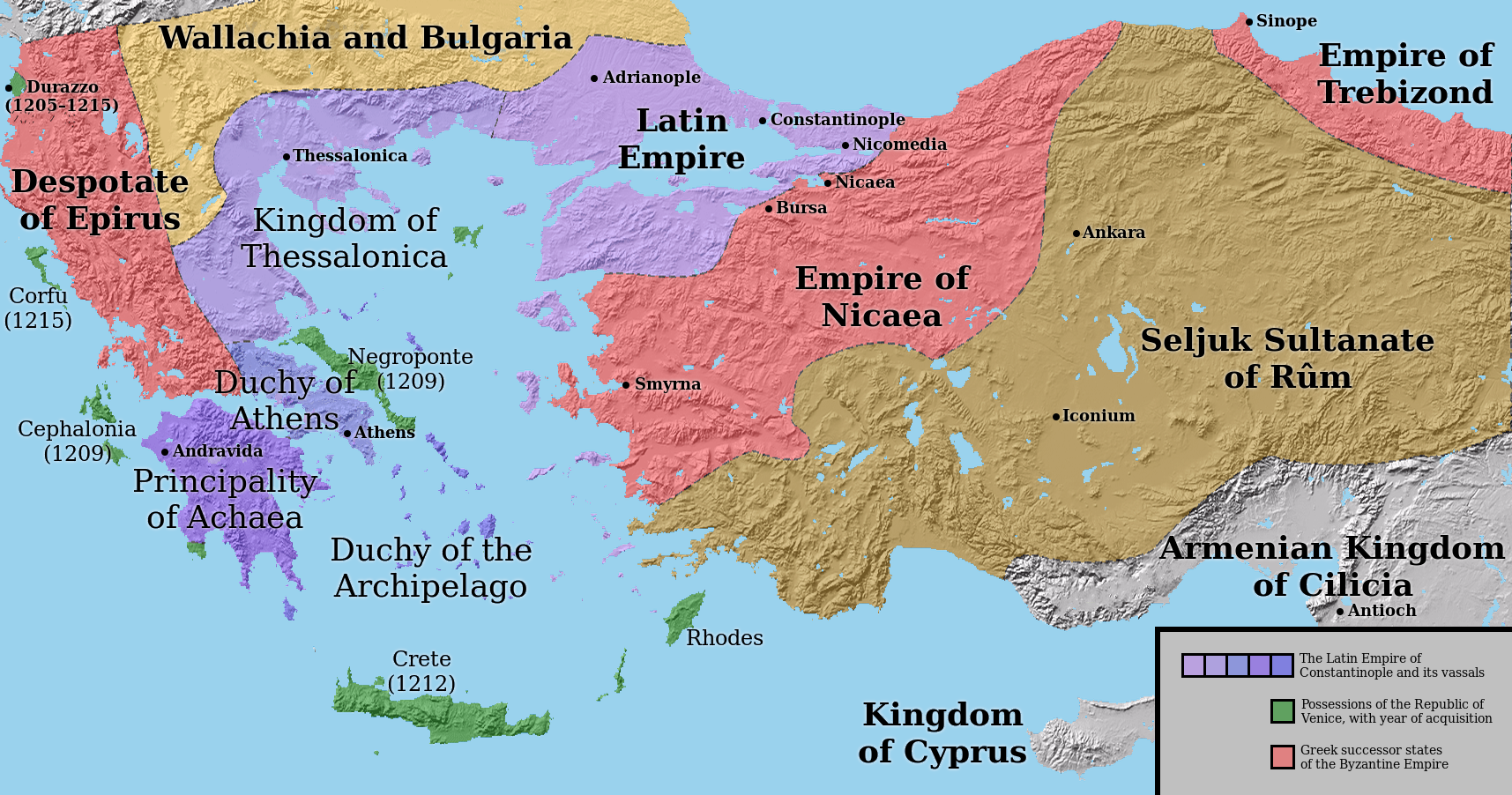
Latin Empire, c. 1212

Months before the sack of Constantinople during the Fourth Crusade, the leaders of the Fourth Crusade agreed to partition the Byzantine Empire: an elected emperor would receive a quarter, the rest go to other Frankish leaders and Venice. Trade in wheat, olive oil and silk enriched the lords of the Peloponnese, making Achaea a centre of chivalric life. It survived under Angevin protection until annexed by the Despotate of the Morea in 1430. Athens, initially an Achaean vassal, changed hands before falling to the Ottomans in 1460. Despite Ottoman pressure, Venice retained parts of its Aegean lands into the 18th century.

=== Order states ===
The Teutonic Order was granted Kulmerland in Prussia by the Polish duke Konrad I of Masovia in the 1220s, soon gaining autonomy over future conquests. In 1237, the Teutonic Knights seized Livonia through merger with the Sword Brothers. The Order attracted German settlers with land and privileges, but Polish incursions and internal strife weakened its control after the Battle of Grunwald. Prussia became a Protestant duchy in 1525, Livonia in 1561.

The Hospitallers captured the island of Rhodes from the Byzantines in 1306–1309. Despite its strong fortifications and earlier resistance to Mamluk and Ottoman assaults, Rhodes was taken by Sultan Suleiman II in 1522. In 1530, Emperor Charles V granted the Hospitallers the islands of Malta and Gozo. They withstood the 1565 Great Siege of Malta, but lost the islands to Napoleon Bonaparte in 1798.

== Contemporary criticism ==
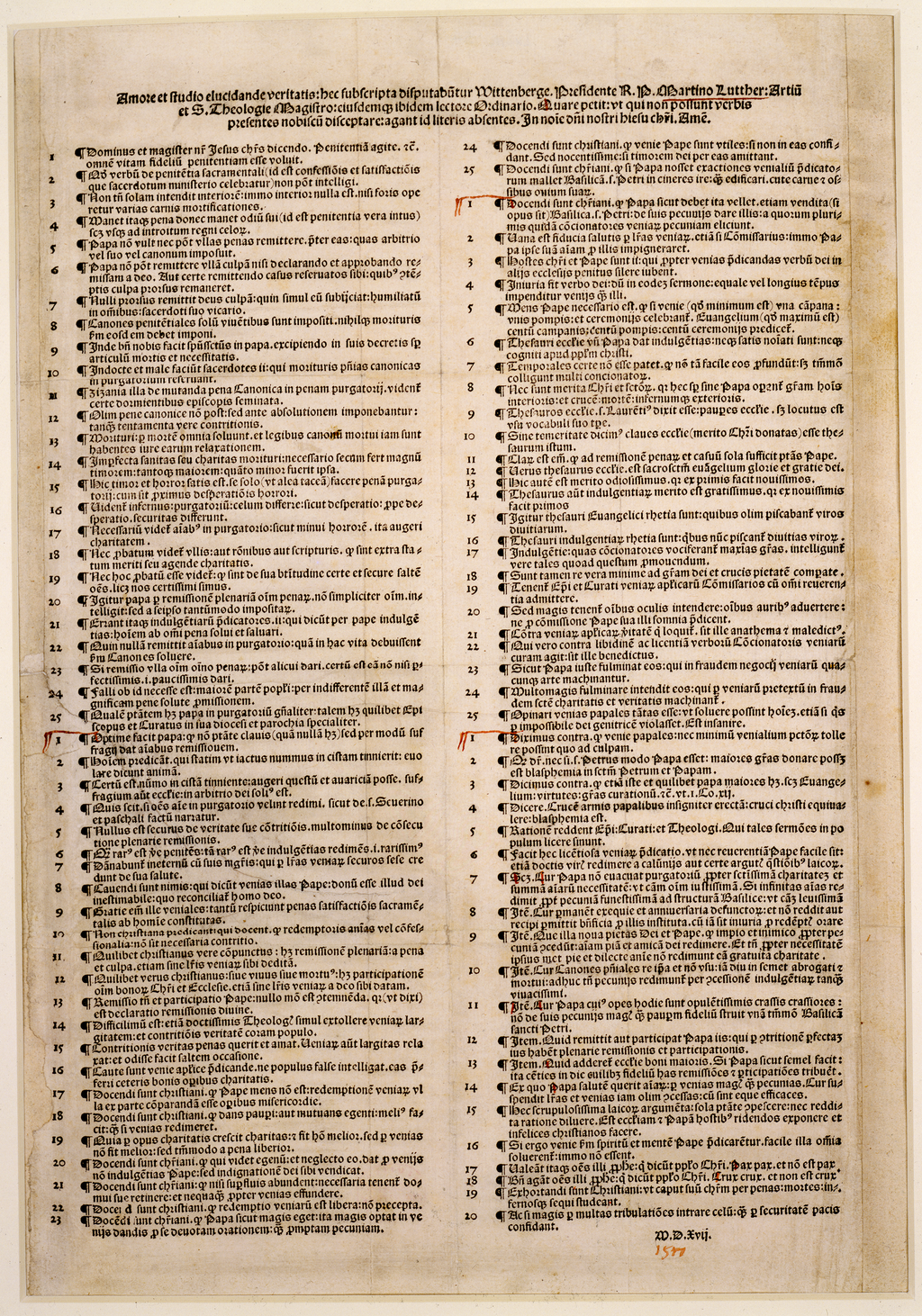
Martin Luther's Ninety-five Theses against indulgences (1517)

Opponents of the Gregorian Reform, such as Sigebert of Gembloux, condemned penitential warfare, but their voice was lost in the euphoria following the First Crusade. The concept was equally alien to Byzantines; Princess Anna Komnene openly scorned the Crusades and their participants. Mainstream Catholic criticism targeted specific aspects such as the risks posed by crusaders' absences. The rise of military orders also drew objections from those who viewed monasticism as incompatible with knighthood. Millenarian thinkers like Joachim of Fiore saw the Crusades as transient, predicting the Muslims' voluntary conversion.

As the Crusades spread geographically, criticism intensified, especially over campaigns against Christians. (Note: Guilhem Figueira, a famous troubadour, blamed the papacy for the failure of the Fifth Crusade at Damietta, stating that the Holy See had offered a "false pardon" to the French crusaders when declaring the Albigensian Crusades.) Some Occitan troubadours even equated anti-heretic crusaders with Muslim foes. The Levantine crusades' failure prompted the chronicler Salimbene di Adam to conclude they lacked divine support. Driven by despair, the troubadour Austorc d'Aorlhac and the Templar Ricaut Bonomel approached apostasy in their lyrics. In 1274, Humbert of Romans produced a full rebuttal to anti-Crusade critics.

From the Reformation, anti-Catholic theologians attacked crusading. Martin Luther denounced indulgences and papal authority. The Catholic theologian Erasmus also criticized indulgence preaching and clerical involvement in warfare.

Excerpts from Martin Luther's first thesis against indulgences (1517)

Although indulgences are the very merits of Christ and of His saints and so should be treated with all reverence, they have in fact nonetheless become a shocking exercise of greed. For who actually seeks the salvation of souls through indulgences, and not instead money for his coffers? ... The people are always left in ignorance, so that they come to think that by gaining indulgences they are at once saved.

— Martin Luther, Ninety-five Theses

== Architecture ==
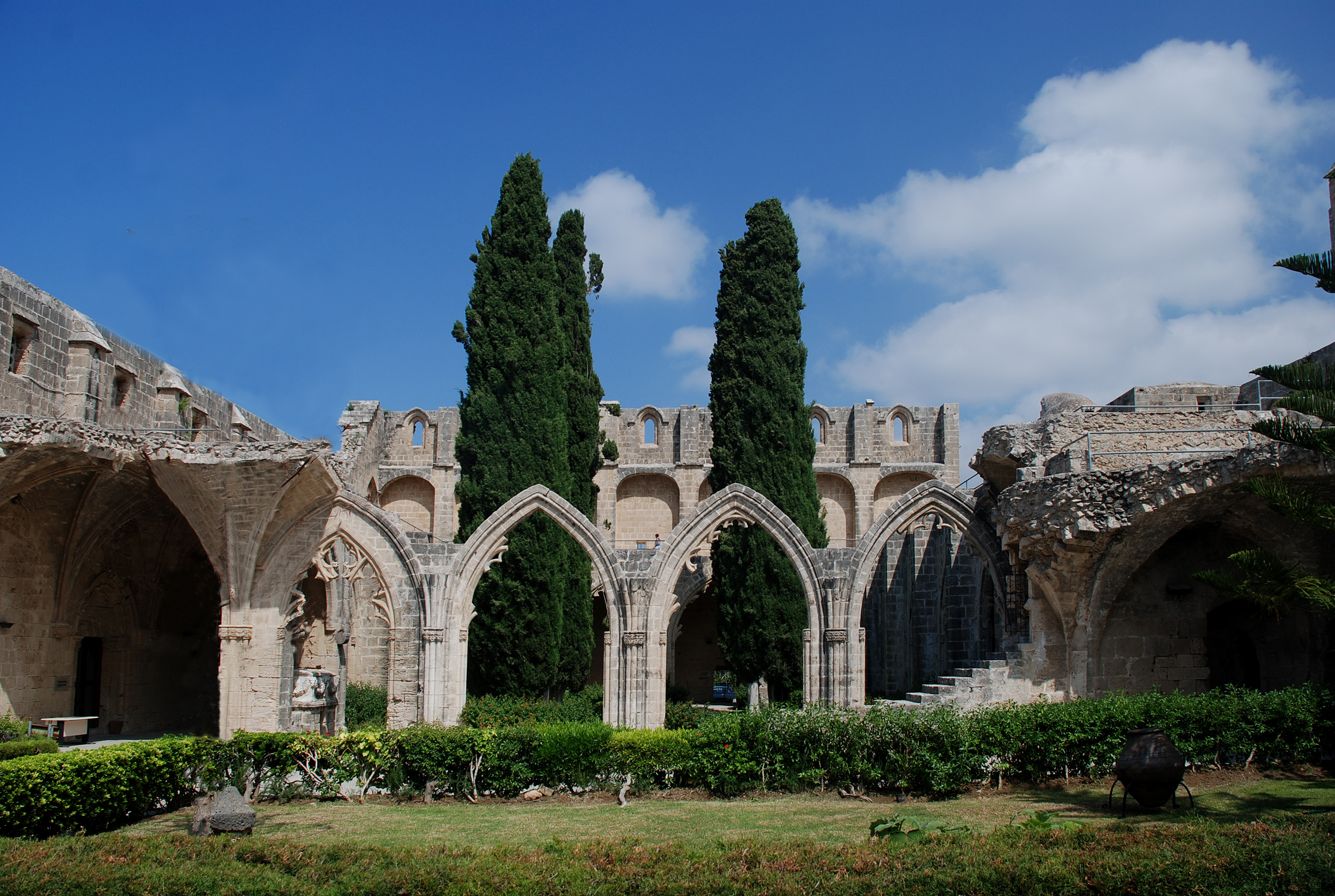
Ruins of the walled courtyard of the Catholic Bellapais Abbey in Cyprus

The destruction of Christian shrines by the Turkomans featured prominently in Pope Urban's speech at Clermont. After capturing Bethlehem, Jerusalem, and Nazareth—three of Christendom's holiest sites—the Franks launched ambitious construction programmes. The archaeologist Denys Pringle observes that a "coherent and distinctive" architectural style emerged, shaped by the abundance of stone, scarcity of timber, and preference for flat-roofed designs. The medievalist Steve Tibble terms it the "architecture of fear", characterised by the use of heavy timber bolts, and windows secured with iron bars.

The most remarkable project was the rebuilding of the Church of the Holy Sepulchre, redesigned in the style of Western pilgrimage churches to enclose the Aedicule, Calvary, and Christ's Prison within one complex. The fusion of local and Western architectural traditions is well illustrated by the Armenian Cathedral of Saint James. Coastal towns had multi-storey houses with shops or loggias below and residences above. Frankish settlers often lived in newly founded villages laid out in rectangular plans.

Western architectural development is especially visible in Cyprus. The Saint Sophia Cathedral in Nicosia (now Selimiye Mosque) was built in early Gothic, though with terraced roofs. The Venetian governors' palace in Famagusta features a Renaissance façade. Urban eastern Christian churches also adopted Western styles. In Frankish Greece, monastic orders and nobles erected Gothic monasteries and rebuilt existing buildings in Gothic style, (Note: In Athens, the De la Roche dukes converted the Propylaia into a fortified palace embellishing it with Gothic elements.) In the Baltic, public buildings reflected Western styles, characterized by simplicity and precision.

== Arts ==
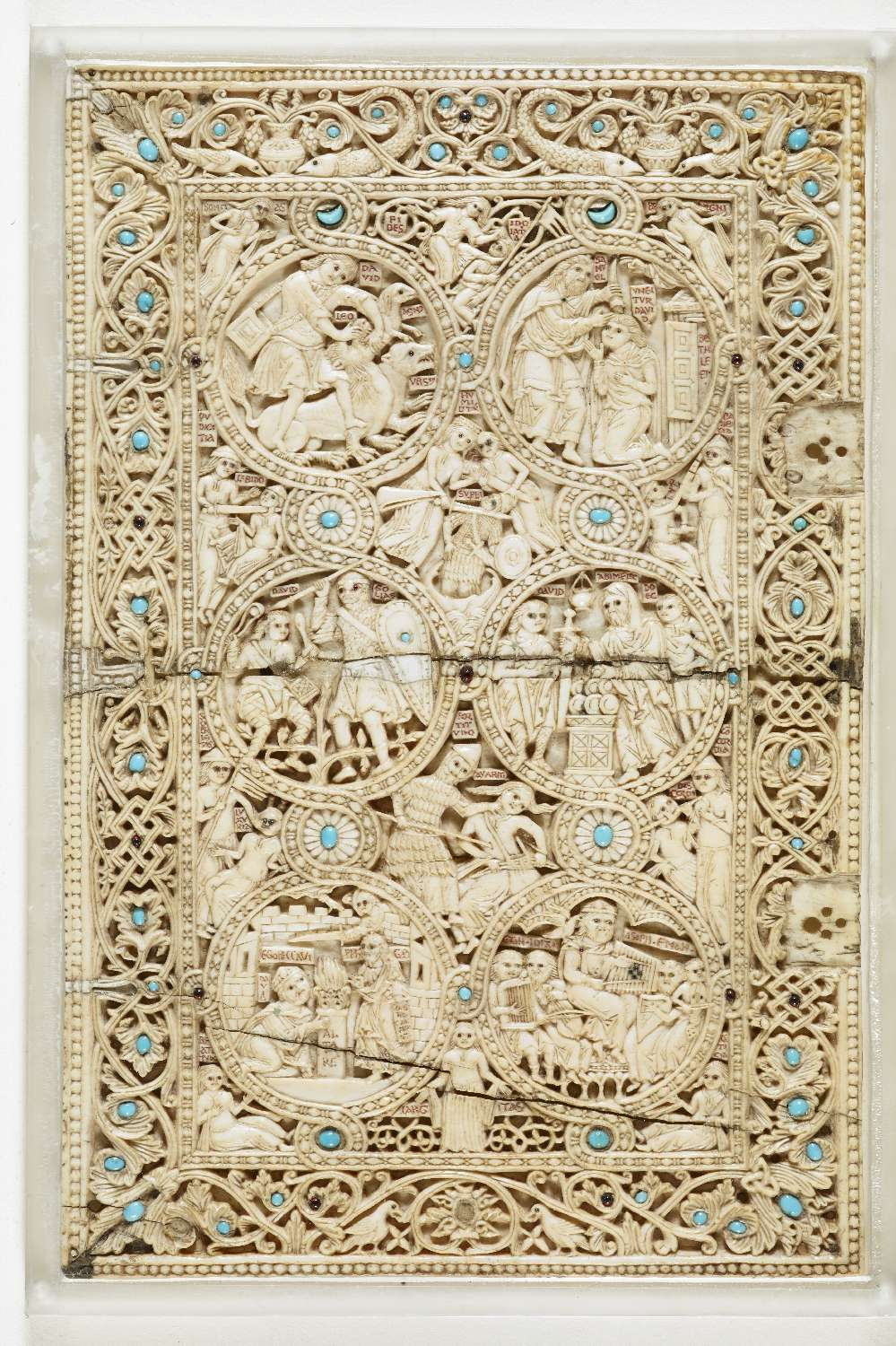
Ivory front cover of the Melisende Psalter, c. 1135

In the three northern Crusader states, figurative art survives almost solely on coinage, (Note: The art historian Jaroslav Folda identifies a large-format Bible, now in San Daniele del Friuli, as a likely exception because of its distinctive style, blending Armenian, Byzantine, and Syriac elements—well suited to an Antiochene context.) whereas Jerusalem left a much richer artistic legacy. These artefacts reveal significant Byzantine influence, although the earliest surviving decorations exhibit Western stylistic features. (Note: Folda suggests that a life-sized silver sculpture of Christ was the first artefact placed in the Aedicule during the Crusader period, known only from a remark by Daniel the Traveller, a pilgrim from Rus'.) By the mid-12th century, both the Holy Sepulchre and the Church of the Nativity were decorated with mosaics. Western artists working on illuminated manuscripts in Jerusalem also embraced Byzantine aesthetics. The finest example is the Melisende Psalter, commissioned by King Fulk for Queen Melisende c. 1135. Jotischky describes Frankish sponsorship of icons as perhaps the clearest sign of "Byzantine tastes in crusader arts", with surviving works primarily housed in Saint Catherine's Monastery on Mount Sinai and in Cyprus.

From Frankish Greece, little remains. A cycle of frescoes portraying Francis of Assisi survives in Istanbul's Kalenderhane Mosque, and a wall painting of Saints Anthony and James in a gatehouse at Acronauplia. In the Baltic, the celibate or endogamous elites rejected local traditions, preserving a distinctly Catholic and German culture.

== Literature ==
Coinciding with the "Twelfth-Century Renaissance", the movement inspired a remarkable range of literary works, including what historian Elizabeth Lapina describes as "an unusually large and varied body" of narrative sources.

=== Chronicles ===
Early accounts of the First Crusade revived the tradition of comprehensive military history last seen in antiquity. The Deeds of the Franks, completed by 1104, became the basis for later accounts by Raymond of Aguilers, Fulcher of Chartres, and Robert of Rheims. These pro-papal writers portrayed Pope Urban as the key instigator, although the German chronicler Albert of Aachen credited Peter the Hermit.

Although the First Crusade remained the most extensively recorded, subsequent expeditions inspired new works by Odo of Deuil, Otto of Freising, and Oliver of Paderborn. Whereas early narratives were in Latin, three chroniclers of the Fourth Crusade—Geoffrey of Villehardouin, Robert of Clari, and Henri de Valenciennes—wrote in Old French. Many chroniclers focused on individual crusaders. (Note: For instance, Geoffrey of Bouillon was Albert of Aachen's hero, Ralph of Caen dedicated his Deeds of Tancred to the Italo–Norman noble Tancred, and Jean de Joinville wrote a hagiography about Louis IX.) Several authors blended prose and verse in the hybrid prosimetra form.

A distinct literary genre emerged around the Crusader states. William of Tyre's chronicle sought to rally Western support and sustain Frankish morale. The Chronicle of the Morea, central to Frankish Greece's history, survives in French, Greek, Aragonese, and Italian. In the Baltic, the chronicler Henry of Livonia sympathized with Christianized natives, whereas the Livonian Rhymed Chronicle glorified Crusader brutality.

=== Songs ===
Excerpt from the Prologue to the Song of Antioch

Christians should take the sign of the Cross for His sake and seek revenge on the descendants of Antichrist. Our Lord asks you to go to Jerusalem to kill and confound the wicked pagans who refuse to believe in God and adore His works or pay heed to His commandments.

— Anonymous, Song of Antioch

Text from the Song of My Cid

Robert of Rheims's chronicle inspired verses in the Song of Antioch, a French epic poem recounting Antioch's siege. This work launched a semi-historical cycle of Crusade epics. Only 179 vernacular songs survive, mostly in Occitan by troubadours, using traditional forms like sirventes, pastorellas, and planhs. The literary scholar Linda Paterson highlights the Occitan Marcabru's praise of the Iberian crusades as especially powerful. Most French and Occitan songs date to the Third Crusade. In Iberia, the Song of My Cid recounts the exploits of the Castilian noble Rodrigo Díaz de Vivar, establishing a tradition of ballads on the wars of the Reconquista.

=== Muslim, eastern Christian and Jewish works ===
Though medieval Muslim scholars never treated the Crusades as a distinct subject, Muslim poets like Ibn al-Khayyat warned of the threat of the "polytheists". Only two Muslim texts record daily contact with Franks: the aristocrat Usama ibn Munqidh's memoir and Ibn Jubayr's pilgrimage account. Some Arabic epics—such as the tale of the warrior woman Dhat al-Himma—also reference the crusades. For the history of the Iberian crusades, the early-14th-century compendium by Ibn 'Idhari is a particularly reliable source.

After the First Crusade, Byzantine writers increasingly treated Western Europeans as a single group, using terms such as Latini. Niketas Choniates and other chroniclers acknowledged Latin military skill but depicted them as barbarians. During the Second Crusade, clashes inspired two poems likening crusaders to wild beasts. Later, Byzantine vernacular literature absorbed motifs—knights, love, and adventure—from chivalric romance.

The earliest Armenian reference to the Crusades—a 1098 colophon to a legal text—speaks of the arrival of "the western nation of heroes". Chroniclers such as Matthew of Edessa cast the Crusades in apocalyptic terms, associating Frankish rule with the fourth kingdom in Daniel's prophecy. In 1144, the prelate Nerses Shnorhali composed a Lament for the Fall of Edessa, voicing hope for Islam's future downfall. The Cilician noble Smbat's Chronicle shows familiarity with Western customs.

The Rhineland massacres sparked a literary response unprecedented in European Jewish history. The Mainz Anonymous, one of the earliest Hebrew accounts, inspired subsequent chronicles, including Eliezer ben Nathan's. Laments commemorating the pogroms entered the Ninth of Av liturgy c. 1200. Jewish pilgrims such as Benjamin of Tudela recorded their journey in travelogues, and an unknown Jew from France who settled in the Holy Land in 1211 wrote a treatise urging others to reclaim it for Judaism.

== Legacy ==
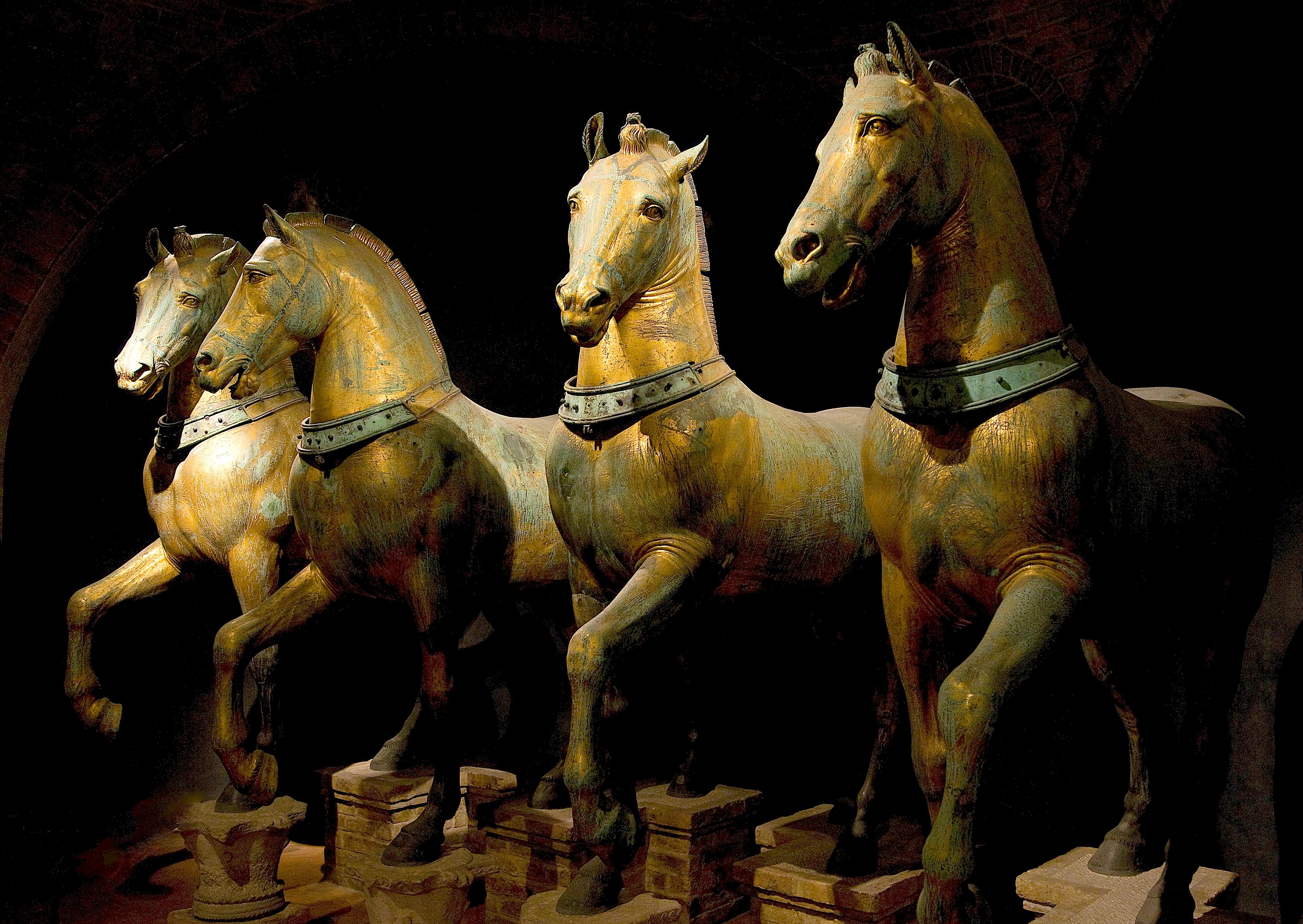
Horses of Saint Mark, brought to Venice among the spoils of the Sack of Constantinople

Scholars disagree on how the movement shaped interfaith relations. Although the campaigns caused suffering and deepened religious tensions, their violence was typical for the era. The Crusades' impact on intercultural exchange remains uncertain, as trade and other channels also transmitted ideas and technologies. The Sack of Constantinople severely damaged Catholic–Orthodox relations, hindering cooperation against the Ottomans. Even so, the Crusades delayed Ottoman expansion, and a final Ottoman push into Central Europe was repelled by a crusading force.

The movement fostered the consolidation of western states by removing a substantial portion of their militant local elites and establishing precedents for concentrated taxation. Expanded commercial contact with the wider world encouraged urbanisation in western Europe. The sale of landed property weakened traditional structures founded on the personal ties between vassal and lord.

Crusading extended Western Christendom's frontiers in Iberia and the Baltic, promoting Catholic settlement and liturgical unity. Political expansion sometimes brought language change or even extinction, as seen in the near-total disappearance of Arabic documents in Iberia by 1290 and the loss of Old Prussian by 1680. Crusading also gave rise to national heroes and symbols, such as Denmark's flag, the Dannebrog. Few existing institutions, mostly offshoots of former military orders, trace their origins to the crusading movement. The idea of Christian violence as an act of love persists in some interpretations, such as liberation theology.

== Modern perceptions ==
Into the 20th century, France and Britain invoked the Crusades to justify ambitions in the Middle East. Today, they often symbolize a long-standing civilisational conflict. After 9/11, President George W. Bush controversially called the war on terror a "crusade". Muslim fundamentalists often label adversaries as "crusaders", (Note: Such a broad use of the term can be found in Osama bin Laden's Declaration of the World Islamic Front for Jihad Against Jews and Crusaders, which lists the Saudi royal family among its enemies.) and terms like "neo-Crusades" appear in popular discussions about Western or Russian military presence in the Middle East. Anti-Zionists frequently draw parallels between the Crusader states and modern Israel.

Crusaders often donated relics to churches, and across Western Europe, statutes, frescoes, and stained glass commemorated the crusades. (Note: For example, stained-glass windows in Saint Denis Abbey depict scenes from the First Crusade.) During the Romantic period, medieval crusading literature inspired artists, as seen in the 1830s decoration of five Versailles rooms with 120 paintings. Major works like Jerusalem Delivered by Torquato Tasso influenced later writers. Walter Scott's Ivanhoe (1819) and The Talisman (1825) shaped popular depictions despite historical inaccuracies. To this day, Crusades-themed epic films exploit and reinterpret medieval imagery as both source and mirror of modern nations and conflicts. (Note: Early examples include Cecil B. DeMille's The Crusades, promoting US neutrality in global conflicts, and Sergei Eisenstein's monumental Alexander Nevsky, portraying the Teutonic Knights as Nazi precursors. In Middle Eastern cinema, Youssef Chahine's Al Nasser Salah Ad-Din ('Saladin the Victorious') presents Saladin as a medieval counterpart to the Egyptian president Gamal Abdel Nasser.) Depictions of the Crusades in modern cinema frequently draw historians' criticism; for instance, the argument of Riley-Smith that in Kingdom of Heaven (2005), the director Ridley Scott conveyed a historical perspective akin to Osama bin Laden's.

== Historiography ==
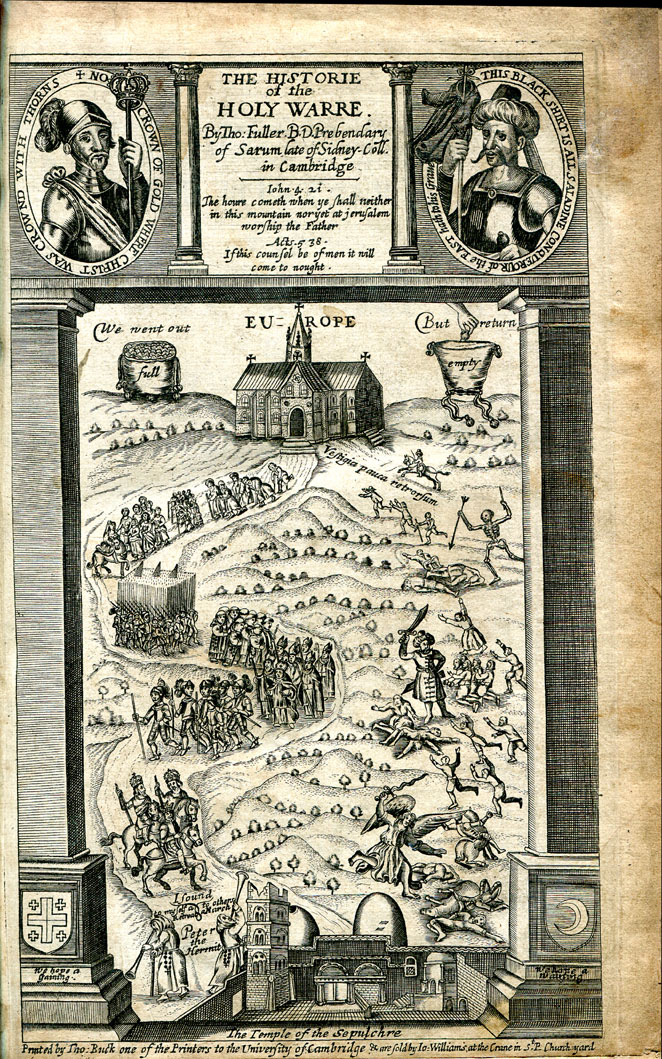
Title page of the third edition of The Historie of the Holy Warre, by Thomas Fuller (1647)

Western Crusade historiography's first phase began with First Crusade accounts and continued until c. 1600, amid ongoing Muslim–Christian conflict. Catholic historians interpreted the Crusades through an irredentist lens, framing them as efforts to reclaim Christian territory. (Note: The 14th-century Castilian aristocrat Juan Manuel explicitly stated in his Libro de los estados ('Book of the States') that there "will be war until the Christians have recovered the lands that the Muslims seized from them".) The terminology was fluid, reflecting the movement's association with pilgrimage through terms such as iter ('journey'); broader expressions, particularly expeditio crucis ('expedition of the cross'), were also employed.

A second phase began in 1611 with the publication of primary sources by Jacques Bongars, later used by Thomas Fuller, who completed a general Crusade history in 1639. Scholarship reflected strong ideological leanings: Protestants like Fuller were critical, whereas Catholics such as Louis Maimbourg were more sympathetic. Over time, terminology shifted—by the 18th century, neutral terms like Kreuzzug, croisade, and crusade replaced earlier expressions like "holy war". Enlightenment thinkers grew increasingly critical, exemplified by Voltaire's reference to the "madness of the crusades" (1751).

The third phase, beginning c. 1800, was shaped by nationalism and Romanticism, prompting a more positive reassessment. Landmark works included Friedrich Wilken's History of the Crusades from Eastern and Western Sources and Joseph-François Michaud's History of the Crusades. In the 1830s, Leopold von Ranke introduced modern source criticism, later applied by Heinrich von Sybel to the First Crusade. International collaboration advanced with the 1875 founding of the Société de l'Orient Latin ('Society of the Latin East'). Critical editions of source material supported influential histories by René Grousset (1930s) and Steven Runciman (1950s). Major later surveys include the Wisconsin Collaborative History of the Crusades (1955–1989) and the Oxford Illustrated History of the Crusades (1995). Early-21st-century scholarly debates focus on defining the Crusades, assessing participants' motives, and interpreting the movement through colonial or integrative models, and earlier Eurocentric narratives are increasingly being challenged.

Muslim historiography largely overlooked the topic until 1899, when the Egyptian Sayyid ʿAli al-Ḥarīrī wrote the first Arabic account. In the 2020s, the al-hurub al-salibyya ('wars of the cross') are central to education in Egypt and Jordan. The Syrian historian Soheil Zakkar compiled an encyclopaedia framing the anti-Frankish campaigns as a struggle for Arab liberation.

Greek historians have mainly studied the stavrósforía ('bearing of the cross') within Byzantine history, but Greek Cypriot scholars emphasize that the Third Crusade severed Cyprus from Byzantium and introduced a repressive regime. In Israel, Joshua Prawer's work established Crusade studies as a distinct academic field.

== See also ==
- Christianity and violence
- History of Christianity
- Jihad
- Religious violence

== Bibliography ==
- Ailes, Marianne (2019). "The Chanson de geste". In Bale, Anthony (ed.). The Cambridge Companion to the Literature of the Crusades. Cambridge Companions to Literature. Cambridge University Press. pp. 25–38. ISBN 978-1-1084-7451-1.
- Al'Zoby, Mazhar (2021). "'Frankish Invasions' and 'A Cosmic Struggle between Islam and Christianity'—A View from Jordan". In Hinz, Felix; Meyer-Hamme, Johannes (eds.). Controversial Histories—Current Views on the Crusades. Engaging the Crusades. Vol. Three. Routledge. pp. 24–25. ISBN 978-0-367-51127-2.
- Asbridge, Thomas (2012) [2010]. The Crusades: The War for the Holy Land. Simon and Schuster. ISBN 978-1-8498-3688-3.
- Backman, Clifford R. (2022) [2009]. The Worlds of Medieval Europe (Fourth ed.). Oxford University Press. ISBN 978-0-1975-7153-8.
- Blaydes, Lisa; Paik, Christopher (Summer 2016). "The Impact of Holy Land Crusades on State Formation: War Mobilization, Trade Integration, and Political Development in Medieval Europe". International Organization. 70 (3): 551–586. doi:10.1017/S0020818316000096. ISSN 0020-8183. JSTOR 24758130.
- Bartlett, Robert (1994) [1993]. The Making of Europe: Conquest, Colonization and Cultural Change, 950–1350. Penguin Books. ISBN 978-0-140-15409-2.
- Bouras, Charalambos (2001). "The Impact of Frankish Architecture on Thirteenth-Century Byzantine Architecture". In Laiou, Angeliki E.; Mottahedeh, Roy Parviz (eds.). The Crusades from the Perspectives of Byzantium and the Muslim World. Dumbarton Oaks Research Library. pp. 247–262. ISBN 978-0-88402-277-0.
- Brundage, James A. (1997). "Crusaders and Jurists: The Legal Consequences of Crusader Status". In Vauchez, André (ed.). Le concile de Clermont de 1095 et l'appel à la croisade. Actes du Colloque Universitaire International de Clermont-Ferrand (23-25 juin 1995). Publications de l'École française de Rome. Vol. 236. École française de Rome. pp. 141–154. ISBN 978-2-7283-0388-5.
- Bull, Marcus (2002) [1999]. "Origins". In Riley-Smith, Jonathan (ed.). The Oxford History of the Crusades. Oxford University Press. pp. 15–34. ISBN 978-0-1928-0312-2.
- Bysted, Ane L. (2014). The Crusade Indulgence: Spiritual Rewards and the Theology of the Crusades, c. 1095–1216. History of Warfare. Vol. 103. BRILL. ISBN 978-9-0042-8043-4.
- Carr, Mike (2016) [2014]. Merchant Crusaders in the Aegean, 1291–1352. Warfare in History. The Boydell Press. ISBN 978-1-7832-7405-5.
- Caspi-Reisfeld, Keren (2001). "Women Warriors during the Crusades, 1095–1254". In Edgington, Susan B.; Lambert, Sarah (eds.). Gendering the Crusades. University of Wales Press. pp. 94–107. ISBN 978-0-7083-1698-6.
- Cassidy-Welch, Megan (2023). Crusades and Violence. ARC Humanities Press. ISBN 978-1-6418-9475-3.
- Chazan, Robert (2006). The Jews of Medieval Western Christendom, 1000–1500. Cambridge Medieval Textbooks. Cambridge University Press. ISBN 978-0-521-84666-0.
- Chrissis, Nikolaos G. (2021). "Western Agression and Greco—Latin Interaction—A View from Syria". In Hinz, Felix; Meyer-Hamme, Johannes (eds.). Controversial Histories—Current Views on the Crusades. Engaging the Crusades. Vol. Three. Routledge. pp. 42–44. ISBN 978-0-367-51127-2.
- Christiansen, Eric (1997) [1980]. The Northern Crusades (Second ed.). Penguin Books. ISBN 978-0-14-026653-5.
- Cobb, Paul M. (2016) [2014]. The Race for Paradise: An Islamic History of the Crusades. Oxford University Press. ISBN 978-0-1987-8799-0.
- Constable, Giles (2001). "The Historiography of the Crusades". In Laiou, Angeliki E.; Mottahedeh, Roy Parviz (eds.). The Crusades from the Perspectives of Byzantium and the Muslim World. Dumbarton Oaks Research Library. pp. 1–22. ISBN 978-0-88402-277-0.
- Cortest, Luis (1998). "Introduction". In Economou, George (ed.). Poem of the Cid: A Modern Translation with Notes by Paul Blackburn. University of Oklahoma Press. pp. xi–xvi. ISBN 978-0-8061-3022-4.
- Coureas, Nicholas (2021). "The Crusades Confront the Orthdoxs—A Greek Cypriot Viewpoint". In Hinz, Felix; Meyer-Hamme, Johannes (eds.). Controversial Histories—Current Views on the Crusades. Engaging the Crusades. Vol. Three. Routledge. pp. 39–41. ISBN 978-0-367-51127-2.
- Dennis, George T. (2001). "Defenders of the Christian People: Holy War in Byzantium". In Laiou, Angeliki E.; Mottahedeh, Roy Parviz (eds.). The Crusades from the Perspectives of Byzantium and the Muslim World. Dumbarton Oaks Research Library. pp. 31–40. ISBN 978-0-88402-277-0.
- Dickson, Gary (2006). "Popular Crusades". In Murray, Alan V. (ed.). K–Q. The Crusades: An Encyclopedia. Vol. III. ABC Clio. pp. 975–979. ISBN 978-1-57607-862-4.
- Dodwell, C. R. (1993). The Pictorial Arts of the West: 800–1200. Pelican History of Art. Yale University Press. ISBN 978-0-300-06493-3.
- Edbury, Peter (2002) [1999]. "The Latin East, 1291–1661". In Riley-Smith, Jonathan (ed.). The Oxford History of the Crusades. Oxford University Press. pp. 291–322. ISBN 978-0-1928-0312-2.
- El-Azhari, Taef Kamal (2021). "The Former Victors over the Crusades in Palestine—A View from Egypt". In Hinz, Felix; Meyer-Hamme, Johannes (eds.). Controversial Histories—Current Views on the Crusades. Engaging the Crusades. Vol. Three. Routledge. pp. 45–46. ISBN 978-0-367-51127-2.
- Ellenblum, Ronnie (2012). The Collapse of the Eastern Mediterranean: Climate Change and the Decline of the East, 950–1072. Cambridge University Press. ISBN 978-1-1070-2335-2.
- Folda, Jaroslav (2002) [1999]. "Art in the Latin East, 1098–1291". In Riley-Smith, Jonathan (ed.). The Oxford History of the Crusades. Oxford University Press. pp. 138–154. ISBN 978-0-1928-0312-2.
- Forey, Alan (2002) [1999]. "The Military Orders, 1120–1312". In Riley-Smith, Jonathan (ed.). The Oxford History of the Crusades. Oxford University Press. pp. 15–34. ISBN 978-0-1928-0312-2.
- France, John (1999). Western Warfare in the Age of the Crusades, 1000–1300. Cornell University Press. ISBN 978-0-8014-3671-0.
- Friedman, Yvonne (2001). "Captivity and Randsom: The Experience of Women". In Edgington, Susan B.; Lambert, Sarah (eds.). Gendering the Crusades. University of Wales Press. pp. 121–139. ISBN 978-0-7083-1698-6.
- Gerstel, Sharon E. J. (2001). "Art and Identity in the Medieval Morea". In Laiou, Angeliki E.; Mottahedeh, Roy Parviz (eds.). The Crusades from the Perspectives of Byzantium and the Muslim World. Dumbarton Oaks Research Library. pp. 263–286. ISBN 978-0-88402-277-0.
- Ghazarian, Jacob G. (2005) [2000]. The Armenian Kingdom in Cilicia during the Crusades: The Integration of Cilician Armenians with the Latins, 1080–1393. RoutledgeCurzon. ISBN 978-0-7007-1418-6.
- Haydock, Nickolas (2009a). "'The Unseen Cross Upon the Breast': Medievalism, Orientalism, and Discontent". In Haydock, Nickolas; Risden, E. L. (eds.). Hollywood in the Holy Land: Essays on Film Depictions of the Crusades and Christian–Muslim Clashes. McFarland & Company. pp. 1–38. ISBN 978-0-7864-4156-3.
- Haydock, Nickolas (2009b). "Homeland Security: Northern Crusades through the East–European Eyes of Alexander Nevsky and the Nevsky Tradition". In Haydock, Nickolas; Risden, E. L. (eds.). Hollywood in the Holy Land: Essays on Film Depictions of the Crusades and Christian–Muslim Clashes. McFarland & Company. pp. 47–96. ISBN 978-0-7864-4156-3.
- Hillenbrand, Carole (2018) [1999]. The Crusades: Islamic Perspectives. Edinburgh University Press. ISBN 978-0-7486-0630-6.
- Hodgson, Natasha R. (2017) [2007]. Women, Crusading and the Holy Land in Historical Narrative. Warfare in History. The Boydell Press. ISBN 978-1-78327-270-9.
- Hornby, A. S. (2005) [1948]. Wehmeier, Sally; McIntosh, Colin; Turnbull, Joanna; Ashby, Michael (eds.). Oxford Advanced Learner's Dictionary (Seventh ed.). Oxford University Press. ISBN 978-0-1943-1606-4.
- Housley, Norman (2002) [1999]. "The Crusading Movement, 1274–1700". In Riley-Smith, Jonathan (ed.). The Oxford History of the Crusades. Oxford University Press. pp. 258–290. ISBN 978-0-1928-0312-2.
- Irwin, Robert (2002) [1999]. "Islam and the Crusades, 1096–1699". In Riley-Smith, Jonathan (ed.). The Oxford History of the Crusades. Oxford University Press. pp. 211–257. ISBN 978-0-1928-0312-2.
- Isa, Mohamad (2021). "A Sate of Continuous Rape and Violation—A View from Syria". In Hinz, Felix; Meyer-Hamme, Johannes (eds.). Controversial Histories—Current Views on the Crusades. Engaging the Crusades. Vol. Three. Routledge. pp. 62–63. ISBN 978-0-367-51127-2.
- Jaspert, Nikolas (2006) [2003]. The Crusades. Routledge. ISBN 978-0-4153-5968-9.
- Jeffreys, Elizabeth; Jeffreys, Michael (2001). "The "Wild Beast from the West": Immediate Literary Reactions in Byzantium to the Second Crusade". In Laiou, Angeliki E.; Mottahedeh, Roy Parviz (eds.). The Crusades from the Perspectives of Byzantium and the Muslim World. Dumbarton Oaks Research Library. pp. 101–116. ISBN 978-0-88402-277-0.
- Jotischky, Andrew (2017) [2004]. Crusading and the Crusader States (Second ed.). Routledge. ISBN 978-1-1388-0806-5.
- Kazhdan, Alexander (2001). "Latins and Franks in Byzantium: Perception and Reality from the Eleventh to the Twelfth Century". In Laiou, Angeliki E.; Mottahedeh, Roy Parviz (eds.). The Crusades from the Perspectives of Byzantium and the Muslim World. Dumbarton Oaks Research Library. pp. 83–100. ISBN 978-0-88402-277-0.
- Kostick, Conor (2008). The Social Structure of the First Crusade. The Medieval Mediterranean: Peoples, Economies and Cultures, 400–1500. Vol. 76. Brill. ISBN 978-90-04-16665-3.
- Lapina, Elizabeth (2019). "Crusader Chronicles". In Bale, Anthony (ed.). The Cambridge Companion to the Literature of the Crusades. Cambridge Companions to Literature. Cambridge University Press. pp. 11–24. ISBN 978-1-1084-7451-1.
- Latham, Andrew (March 2011). "Theorizing the Crusades: Identity, Institutions, and Religious War in Medieval Latin Christendom". International Studies Quarterly. 5 (1): 223–243. doi:10.1111/j.1468-2478.2010.00642.x. ISSN 0020-8833. JSTOR 23019520.
- Lilie, Ralph-Johannes (1993) [1981]. Byzantium and the Crusader States, 1096-1204. Oxford University Press. ISBN 978-0-19-820407-7.
- Lloyd, Simon (2002) [1999]. "The Crusading Movement, 1096–1274". In Riley-Smith, Jonathan (ed.). The Oxford History of the Crusades. Oxford University Press. pp. 35–67. ISBN 978-0-1928-0312-2.
- Lock, Peter (1995). The Franks in the Aegean, 1204–1500. Longman. ISBN 978-0-58-205139-3.
- Lock, Peter (2006). The Routledge Companion to the Crusades. Routledge Companion to History. Routledge. ISBN 978-0-4153-9312-6.
- Luttrell, Anthony (2002) [1999]. "The Military Orders, 1312–1798". In Riley-Smith, Jonathan (ed.). The Oxford History of the Crusades. Oxford University Press. pp. 323–362. ISBN 978-0-1928-0312-2.
- MacEvitt, Christopher (2008). The Crusades and the Christian World of the East: Rough Tolerance. The Middle Ages. University of Pennsylvania Press. ISBN 978-0-8122-2083-4.
- Madden, Thomas F. (2013). The Concise History of the Crusades. Critical Issues in World and International History (Third ed.). Rowman & Littlefield. ISBN 978-1-4422-1575-7.
- Mallett, Alex (2020) [2014]. Popular Muslim Reactions to the Franks in the Levant, 1097–1291. Routledge. ISBN 978-0-367-60103-4.
- Mayer, Hans Eberhard (2009) [1965]. The Crusades. Translated by John Gillingham (Second ed.). Oxford University Press. ISBN 978-0-19-873097-2.
- Menache, Sophia (2021). "In the Frontier of the Former Kingdom of Jerusalem: Risk of Misunderstanding—A View from Israel". In Hinz, Felix; Meyer-Hamme, Johannes (eds.). Controversial Histories—Current Views on the Crusades. Engaging the Crusades. Vol. Three. Routledge. pp. 72–74. ISBN 978-0-367-51127-2.
- Morris, Colin (2001) [1989]. The Papal Monarchy: The Western Church from 1050 to 1250. Oxford History of the Christian Church. Clarendon Press. ISBN 978-0-19-826925-0.
- Murray, Alan V. (2006). "Preface". In Murray, Alan V. (ed.). A–C. The Crusades: An Encyclopedia. Vol. I. ABC Clio. pp. xxxi–xxxii. ISBN 978-1-57607-862-4.
- Nicholson, Helen (2004). The Crusades. Greenwood Guides to Historic Events of the Medieval World. Greenwood Press. ISBN 978-0-313-32685-1.
- O'Callaghan, Joseph F. (2003). Reconquest and Crusade in Medieval Spain. The Middle Ages. University of Pennsylvania Press. ISBN 978-0-8122-1889-3.
- Paterson, Linda (2019). "The Troubadours and Their Lyrics". In Bale, Anthony (ed.). The Cambridge Companion to the Literature of the Crusades. Cambridge Companions to Literature. Cambridge University Press. pp. 39–53. ISBN 978-1-1084-7451-1.
- Phillips, Jonathan (2002) [1999]. "The Latin East, 1098–1291". In Riley-Smith, Jonathan (ed.). The Oxford History of the Crusades. Oxford University Press. pp. 111–137. ISBN 978-0-1928-0312-2.
- Phillips, Jonathan (2014) [2002]. The Crusades, 1095–1204. Seminar Studies (Second ed.). Routledge. ISBN 978-1-4058-7293-5.
- Pringle, Denys (2002) [1999]. "Architecture in the Latin East, 1098–1571". In Riley-Smith, Jonathan (ed.). The Oxford History of the Crusades. Oxford University Press. pp. 155–175. ISBN 978-0-1928-0312-2.
- Riley-Smith, Jonathan (2002a) [1999]. "The State of Mind of Crusaders to the East, 1095–1300". In Riley-Smith, Jonathan (ed.). The Oxford History of the Crusades. Oxford University Press. pp. 68–89. ISBN 978-0-1928-0312-2.
- Riley-Smith, Jonathan (2002b) [1999]. "Revival and Survival". In Riley-Smith, Jonathan (ed.). The Oxford History of the Crusades. Oxford University Press. pp. 385–389. ISBN 978-0-1928-0312-2.
- Riley-Smith, Jonathan (2005) [2001]. "The Crusading Movement". In Hartmann, Anja V.; Hauser, Beatrice (eds.). War, Peace and World Orders in European History. Routledge. pp. 127–140. ISBN 978-0-415-24440-4.
- Routledge, Michael (2002) [1999]. "Songs". In Riley-Smith, Jonathan (ed.). The Oxford History of the Crusades. Oxford University Press. pp. 90–110. ISBN 978-0-1928-0312-2.
- Shachar, Uri Zvi (2019). "Hebrew Crusade Literature in Its Latin and Arabic Contexts". In Bale, Anthony (ed.). The Cambridge Companion to the Literature of the Crusades. Cambridge Companions to Literature. Cambridge University Press. pp. 102–118. ISBN 978-1-1084-7451-1.
- Sturtevant, Paul B. (2009). "SaladiNasser: Nasser's Political Crusade in El Naser Salah Ad-Din". In Haydock, Nickolas; Risden, E. L. (eds.). Hollywood in the Holy Land: Essays on Film Depictions of the Crusades and Christian–Muslim Clashes. McFarland & Company. pp. 123–146. ISBN 978-0-7864-4156-3.
- Thomson, John A. (1998). The Western Church in the Middle Ages. Arnold. ISBN 978-0-340-60118-1.
- Thomson, Robert W. (2001). "The Crusaders through Armenian Eyes". In Laiou, Angeliki E.; Mottahedeh, Roy Parviz (eds.). The Crusades from the Perspectives of Byzantium and the Muslim World. Dumbarton Oaks Research Library. pp. 71–82. ISBN 978-0-88402-277-0.
- Tibble, Steve (2025) [2024]. Crusader Criminals: The Knights Who Went Rogue in the Holy Land. Yale University Press. ISBN 978-0-300-28429-4.
- Tyerman, Christopher (2007) [2006]. God's War: A History of the Crusades. Penguin Books. ISBN 978-0-1402-6980-2.
- Tyerman, Christopher (2011). The Debate on the Crusades, 1099–2010. Issues in Historiography. Manchester University Press. ISBN 978-0-7190-7320-5.
- Tyerman, Christopher (2019). The World of the Crusades: An Illustrated History. Yale University Press. ISBN 978-0-3002-1739-1.
- Wicks, Jared (September 1967). "Martin Luther's Treatise on Indulgences". Theological Studies. 28 (3): 481–518. doi:10.1177/004056396702800302.
