= Megan Cassidy-Welch =

Medievalist

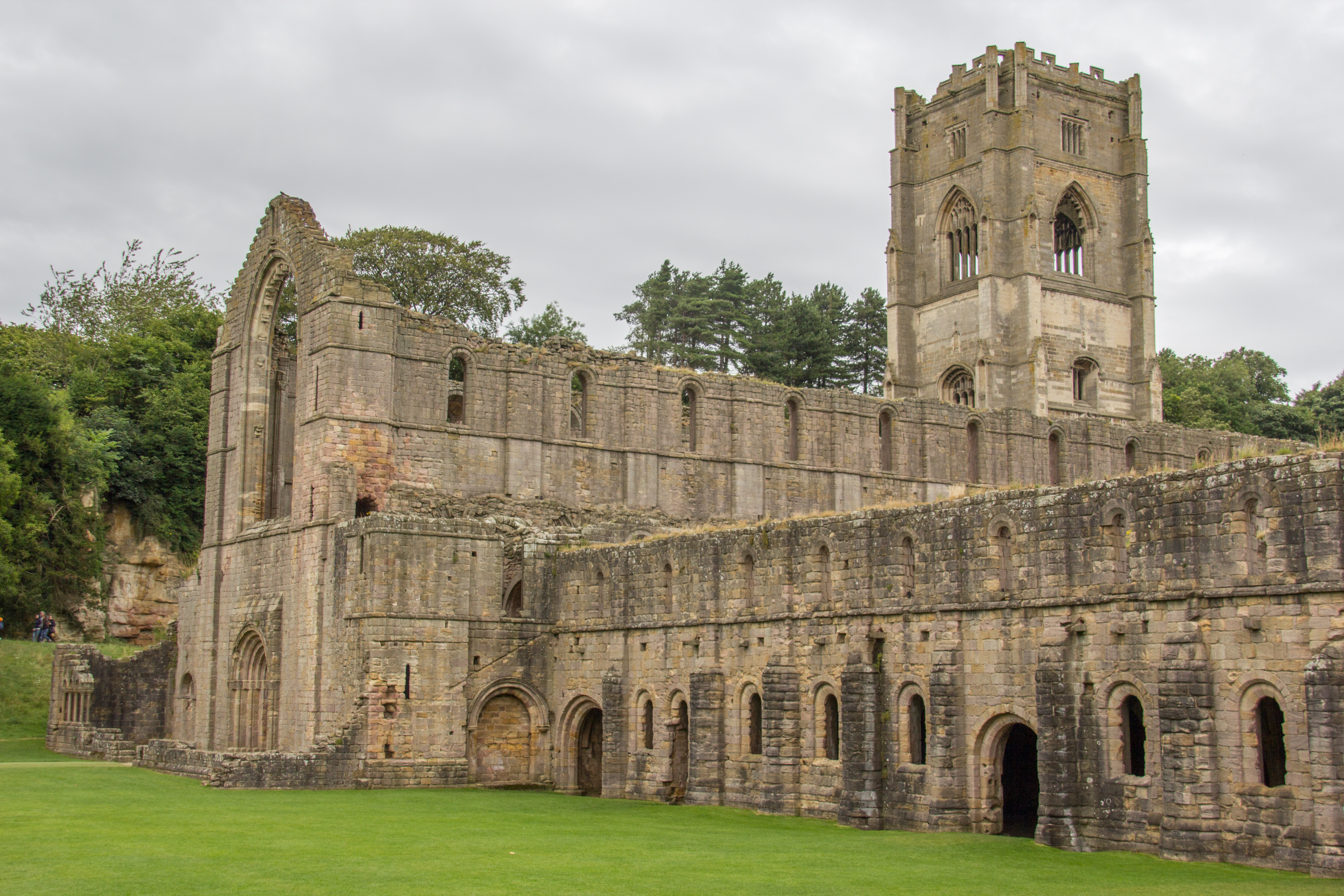
Fountains Abbey, Yorkshire, is one of the largest and best preserved ruined Cistercian monasteries in England

Megan Cassidy-Welch is Interim Vice Chancellor at the University of Divinity. She is an expert in Medieval Studies, a Fellow of the Royal Historical Society, and a Fellow of the Australian Academy of the Humanities. Cassidy-Welch’s substantive role is Dean of Research Strategy at the University of Divinity.

== Education ==
Cassidy-Welch received her MA from Birkbeck, University of London, in 1993, and her PhD from the University of Melbourne in 1998. Her doctoral thesis focused on Thirteenth-Century English Cistercian Monasteries: Monastic Spaces and their Meanings.

== Career ==
Cassidy-Welch was the first woman to hold the McCaughey Chair in History, and Head of the School of Historical and Philosophical Inquiry at the University of Queensland. Prior to working at the University of Queensland, Cassidy-Welch was Head of the School of Philosophical, Historical and International Studies at Monash University. She has been awarded an Australian Research Council Future Fellowship, an Australian Research Council Postdoctoral Fellowship, and several Australian Research Council Discovery Grants over the course of her career.

Cassidy-Welch has published four monographs and seven edited volumes. Her first monograph, Monastic Spaces and their Meanings: Thirteenth-Century English Cistercian Monasteries (Turnhout: Brepols, 2001), was based on her doctoral thesis. Her most recent monograph, Crusades and Violence, was published in 2023 by ARC Humanities Press.

== Bibliography ==
=== Monographs ===
- The Crusades and Medieval Violence (ARC Humanities Press, 2023)
- War and Memory at the Time of the Fifth Crusade (Philadelphia: Pennsylvania State University Press, 2019)
- Imprisonment in the Medieval Religious Imagination, c. 1150-1400 (London: Palgrave MacMillan, 2011)
- Monastic Spaces and their Meanings: Thirteenth-Century English Cistercian Monasteries (Turnhout: Brepols, 2001)

=== Edited volumes ===
- Landscapes of Conflict and Encounter in the Crusading World, special issue of the Journal of Medieval History 47:3 (2021), co-edited with Beth Spacey
- Entangled Histories of Gender and Emotion in the Medieval Mediterranean, special issue of Emotions: History, Culture, Society 4:2 (2020)
- Remembering the Crusades and Crusading (London: Routledge, 2017)
- Memory and the Crusades: Rethinking Past and Present, co-edited with Anne E. Lester (London and New York: Routledge, 2015)
- Practices of Gender in Late Medieval and Early Modern Europe co-edited with Peter Sherlock (Turnhout: Brepols, 2008)
- Memory and the Crusades: Rethinking Past and Present, special issue of The Journal of Medieval History, issue 3, 2014, co-edited with Anne E. Lester
- Medieval Practices of Space and Place, special issue of Parergon, issue 27:2, 2010
