= Fourth Crusade =

Latin Christian armed expedition (1202–1204)

- Part of the Crusades
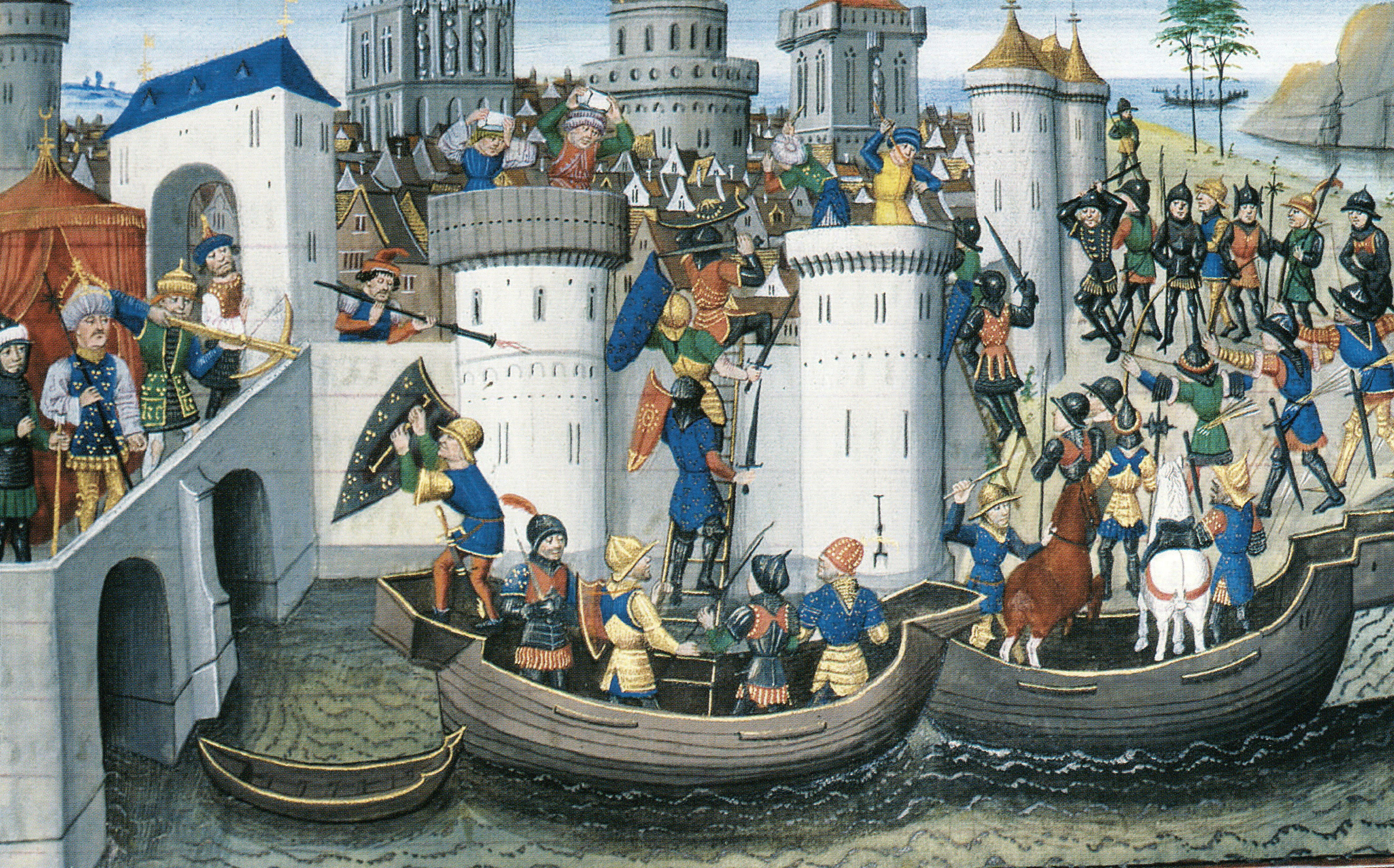
- A 15th-century miniature depicting the conquest of Constantinople by the Crusaders in 1204
Date	1202–1204
Location	Balkans, Anatolia, Dalmatia
Result	See § Aftermath

Belligerents
Crusaders from: Kingdom of France; Holy Roman Empire; Republic of Venice	In Europe: Byzantine Empire; Kingdom of Hungary; Kingdom of Croatia; Holy Land: Ayyubid dynasty

Commanders and leaders
Boniface I of Montferrat; Enrico Dandolo; Theobald III of Champagne #; Baldwin IX of Flanders; Louis I of Blois; Hugh IV of Saint-Pol; Conrad of Halberstadt; Martin of Pairis; Conon de Béthune; Alexios IV Angelos (executed)	Alexios III Angelos; Alexios V Doukas (executed); Al-Adil I

Strength
4,000-5,000 knights; 8,000 infantry; 300 siege weapons; 10,000 sailors and marines; 60 war galleys; 100 horse transports; 50 troop transports	10,000 Byzantine infantry and city militias; 5,000 Varangians; 20 war galleys

The Fourth Crusade (1202–1204) was a Latin Christian armed expedition called by Pope Innocent III. The stated intent of the expedition was to recapture the Muslim-controlled city of Jerusalem, by first defeating the powerful Egyptian Ayyubid Sultanate. However, a sequence of economic and political events culminated in the Crusader army's 1202 siege of Zara and the 1204 sack of Constantinople, rather than the conquest of Egypt as originally planned. This led to the partition of the Byzantine Empire by the Crusaders and their Venetian allies, leading to a period known as the Frankokratia ("Rule of the Franks" in Greek).

In 1201, the Republic of Venice contracted with the Crusader leaders to build a dedicated fleet to transport their invasion force. However, the leaders greatly overestimated the number of soldiers who would embark from Venice, since many sailed from other ports, and the army that appeared could not pay the contracted price. In lieu of payment, the Venetian Doge Enrico Dandolo proposed that the Crusaders back him in attacking the rebellious city of Zara (Zadar) on the eastern Adriatic coast. This led in November 1202 to the sack of Zara, the first attack against a Catholic city by a Catholic Crusader army, despite Pope Innocent III's calls for the Crusaders not to attack fellow Christians. The city was then brought under Venetian control. When the Pope heard of this, he temporarily excommunicated the Crusader army.

In January 1203, en route to Jerusalem, the Crusader leadership entered into an agreement with the Byzantine prince Alexios Angelos to divert their main force to Constantinople and restore his deposed father Isaac II Angelos as emperor, who would then add his support to their invasion of Jerusalem. On 23 June 1203, the main Crusader army reached Constantinople, while other contingents (perhaps a majority of all crusaders) continued to Acre.

In August 1203, following the siege of Constantinople, Alexios was crowned co-emperor. However, in January 1204 he was deposed by a popular uprising, depriving the Crusaders of their promised bounty payments. Following the murder of Alexios on 8 February, the Crusaders decided on the outright conquest of the city. In April 1204, they captured and plundered the city's enormous wealth. Only a handful of the Crusaders continued to the Holy Land thereafter. Several prominent Crusaders, including Enguerrand II of Boves, Simon de Montfort, 5th Earl of Leicester and Guy of Vaux-de-Cernay, among others, disagreed with the attacks on Zara and Constantinople, refused to take part in them and left the crusade.

The conquest of Constantinople was followed by the fragmentation of the Byzantine Empire into three states centered in Nicaea, Trebizond and Epirus. The Crusaders then founded several new Crusader states, known as Frankokratia, in former Roman territory, largely hinged upon the Latin Empire of Constantinople. The presence of the Latin Crusader states almost immediately led to war with the Byzantine successor states and with the Bulgarian Empire. The Nicaean Empire eventually brought about the Reconquest of Constantinople and restored the Byzantine Empire in July 1261.

The Fourth Crusade is considered to have solidified the East–West Schism. The crusade dealt an irrevocable blow to the Byzantine Empire, contributing to its decline and fall as all the unstable governments in the region, the Sack of Constantinople and the thousands of deaths had left the region depleted of soldiers, resources, people and money, leaving it vulnerable to attack. The empire had shrunk as it lost control of most of the Balkans, Anatolia and the Aegean islands. This made the restored empire territorially diminished and vulnerable to invasions from the expanding Ottoman Sultanate in the following centuries, to which the Byzantines ultimately succumbed in 1453.

== Background ==
=== Loss of Jerusalem to the truce of 1198 ===
In 1187, the Ayyubid Sultanate under Saladin conquered most of the Crusader states in the Levant. Jerusalem was lost to the Ayyubids as a result of the siege of Jerusalem in 1187 leading to the calling of the Third Crusade. The Crusader states were then reduced by Saladin to little more than three cities along the coast of the Mediterranean Sea: Tyre, Tripoli and Antioch.

The Third Crusade (1189–1193) was launched in response to the fall of Jerusalem, with the goal of recovering the city. It successfully reclaimed an extensive territory, effectively reestablishing the Kingdom of Jerusalem. Although Jerusalem itself was not recovered, the important coastal towns of Acre and Jaffa were. On 2 September 1192, the Treaty of Jaffa was signed with Saladin, bringing the crusade to an end. The truce would last for three years and eight months.

The crusade had also been marked by a significant escalation in longstanding tensions between the feudal states of western Europe and the Byzantine Empire. During the crusade, Emperor Frederick I Barbarossa had almost besieged Constantinople because of the failure of the Byzantine government and Emperor, Isaac II Angelos, to provide him with safe passage across the Dardanelles because Isaac was busy fighting a pretender named Theodore Mangaphas. The Byzantines for their part suspected him of conspiring with the breakaway Byzantine provinces of Serbia and Bulgaria as Frederick Barbarossa was on friendly terms with Grand Prince Stefan Nemanja of Serbia and also got a letter getting support and fealty from Tsar Ivan Asen I of Bulgaria. King Richard I Lionheart of England also seized the breakaway Eastern Roman province of Cyprus. Rather than return it to the Empire (and realizing his inability to govern it), he gave the island to Guy of Lusignan, the former king of Jerusalem, who lost the crown to a former Eastern Roman ally, Conrad of Montferrat.

Saladin died on 4 March 1193, before the expiration of the truces, and his empire was contested and divided between three of his sons and two of his brothers. The new ruler of the Kingdom of Jerusalem, Henry II of Champagne, signed an extension of the truce with Egyptian Sultan al-Aziz Uthman. In 1197, the peace was interrupted by the arrival of the German Crusade of 1197. Without the permission of Henry, the Germans attacked the territory of al-Adil I of Damascus, who responded by attacking Jaffa. The sudden death of Henry prevented the relief of the port and the city was taken by force. The Germans did, however, succeed in capturing Beirut in the north.

Henry was succeeded by Aimery of Cyprus, who signed a truce with al-Adil of five years and eight months on 1 July 1198. The truce preserved the status quo: Jaffa remained in Ayyubid hands, but its destroyed fortifications could not be rebuilt; Beirut was left to the crusaders; and Sidon was placed under a revenue-sharing condominium. Before the expiration of the new truce on 1 March 1204, al-Adil succeeded in uniting the former empire of Saladin, acquiring Egypt in 1200 and Aleppo in 1202. As a result, his domains almost completely surrounded the diminished Crusader states.

=== Constantinople ===
Constantinople had been in existence for 874 years at the time of the Fourth Crusade and was the largest and most sophisticated city in Christendom. Almost alone amongst major medieval urban centres, it had retained the civic structures, public baths, forums, monuments, and aqueducts of classical Rome in working form. At its height, the city was home to an estimated population of about half a million people protected by 20 km (around 12.4 miles) of triple walls. Its planned location made Constantinople not only the capital of the surviving eastern part of the Roman Empire but also a commercial centre that dominated trade routes from the Mediterranean to the Black Sea, China, India and Persia. As a result, it was both a rival and a tempting target for the aggressive new states of the west, notably the Republic of Venice.

In 1195, the Byzantine Emperor Isaac II Angelos was deposed in favour of his brother by a palace coup. Ascending as Alexios III Angelos, the new emperor had his brother blinded (a traditional punishment for treason, considered more humane than execution) and exiled. Ineffectual on the battlefield, Isaac had also proven to be an incompetent ruler who had let the treasury dwindle and outsourced the navy to the Venetians. His actions in wastefully distributing military weapons and supplies as gifts to his supporters had undermined the empire's defenses. The new emperor was to prove no better. Anxious to shore up his position, Alexios bankrupted the treasury. His attempts to secure the support of semi-autonomous border commanders undermined central authority. He neglected his crucial responsibilities for defence and diplomacy. The emperor's chief admiral (his wife's brother-in-law), Michael Stryphnos, reportedly sold the fleet's equipment down to the very nails to enrich himself.

== Rendezvous at Venice ==
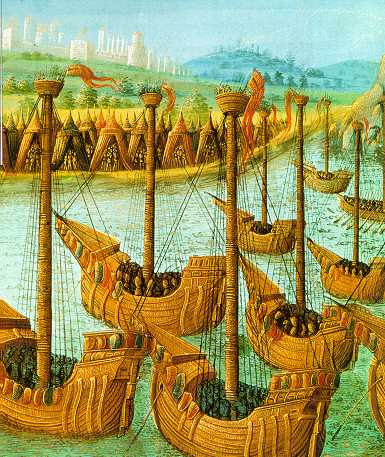
Venetian Navy landing in Constantinople, from a XV Century miniature

Pope Innocent III succeeded to the papacy in January 1198, and the preaching of a new crusade became the prime goal of his pontificate, expounded in his bull Post miserabile. His call was largely ignored by the European monarchs: the Germans were struggling against Papal power, and England and France were still engaged in warfare against each other. However, due to the preaching of Fulk of Neuilly, in November Count Thibaut of Champagne hosted a knightly tournament at his castle in Écry-sur-Aisne. The event, though tinged with mourning for the recent death of Thibaut's uncle, King Richard I of England, became a turning point. During the festivities, Thibaut vowed to abandon martial games and instead dedicate his weapons to God's service, declaring his intention to join a crusade.

By early 1200, a council of leading crusader barons—including Thibaut, Louis of Blois, and Baldwin of Flanders—convened at Soissons to organize the expedition. They agreed to avoid the overland route through the Byzantine Empire and instead sail to Egypt, mirroring Richard I's strategy. To secure ships, the lords appointed a six-member committee, among them Geoffrey of Villehardouin (later the crusade's chronicler), to negotiate contracts with maritime powers. Thibaut was elected leader, but his sudden death in 1201 led to Boniface of Montferrat—brother of Conrad of Montferrat, who had died defending Tyre—assuming command. The committee ultimately secured a fleet through Venice.

Earlier crusades focused on the Land of Israel had involved the slow movement of large and disorganised land hosts across a generally hostile Anatolia. Egypt was now the dominant Muslim power in the eastern Mediterranean but also a major trading partner of Venice. An attack on Egypt would clearly be a maritime enterprise, requiring the creation of a fleet. Genoa was uninterested, but in March 1201 negotiations were opened with the doge of Venice, Enrico Dandolo who agreed to transport 33,500 crusaders, a very ambitious number. This was the moment, according to him, for the Venetian Republic to gain wealth, prestige, land, and trading routes in the Holy Land. This agreement required a full year of preparation on the part of the Venetians to build numerous ships and train the sailors who would man them, all the while curtailing the city's commercial activities. The crusading army was expected to consist of 4,500 knights (as well as 4,500 horses), 9,000 squires, and 20,000 foot-soldiers. The majority of the crusading army that set out from Venice in early October 1202 originated from areas within France. It included men from Blois, Champagne, Amiens, Saint-Pol, the Île-de-France, and Burgundy. Several other regions of Europe sent substantial contingents as well, such as Flanders and Montferrat. Other notable groups came from the Holy Roman Empire, including the men under Martin, abbot of Pairis Abbey and Bishop Conrad of Halberstadt, together in alliance with the Venetian soldiers and sailors led by the doge, Enrico Dandolo. The crusade was to be ready to sail on 24 June 1203 and make directly for the Ayyubid capital, Cairo. This agreement was ratified by Pope Innocent, with a solemn ban on attacks on Christian states.

== Diversion ==
=== Attack on Zara ===
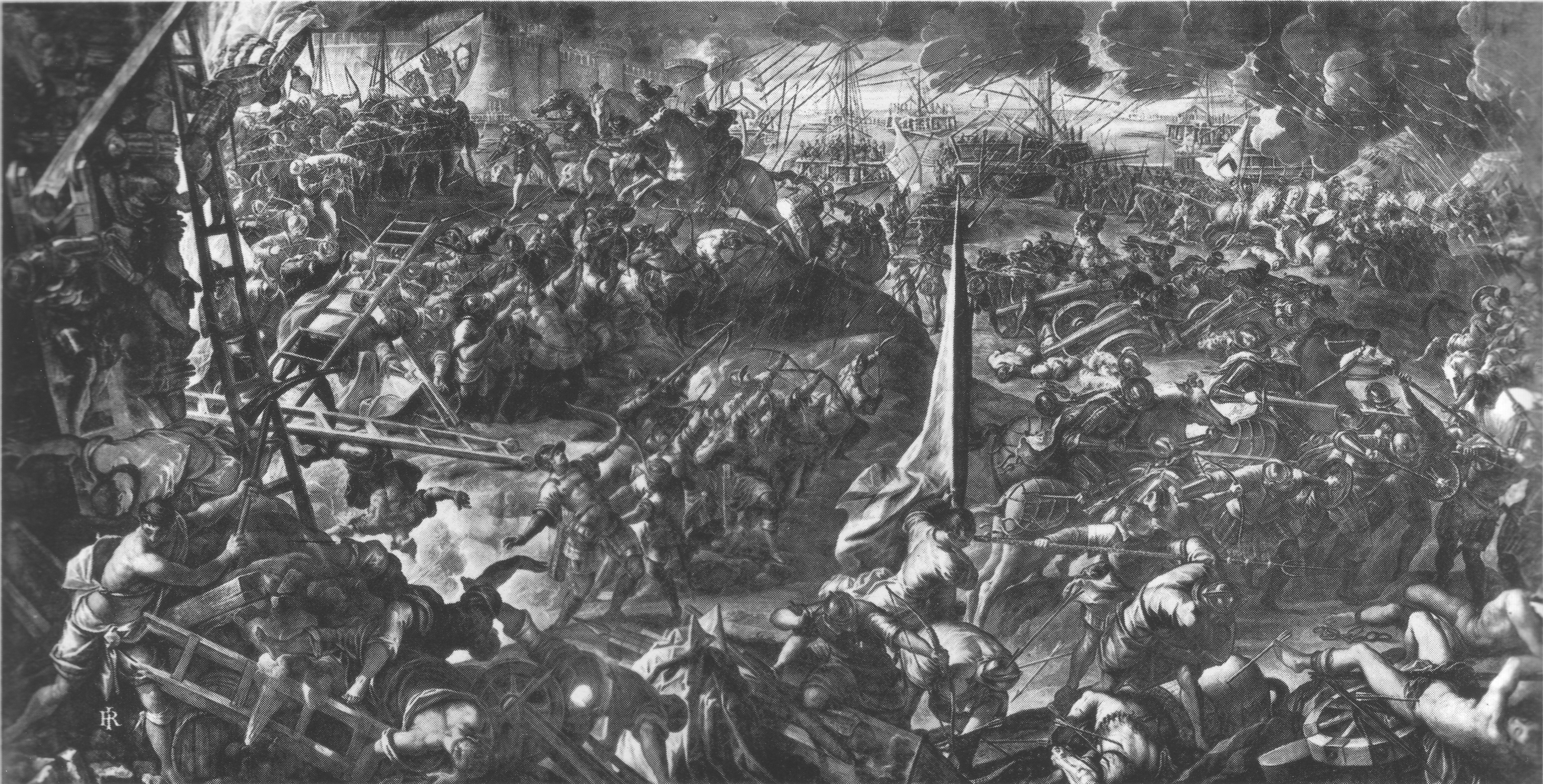
The crusaders conquering the City of Zadar, painted by Tintoretto

There was no binding agreement among the crusaders that all should sail from Venice. Accordingly, many chose to sail from other ports, particularly Flanders, Marseille, and Genoa. By May 1202, the bulk of the crusader army was collected at Venice, although with far smaller numbers than expected: about 12,000 (4,000–5,000 knights and 8,000 foot soldiers) instead of 33,500. The Venetians had performed their part of the agreement: there awaited 50 war galleys and 450 transports – enough for three times the assembled army. The Venetians, under their aged and blind Doge Dandolo, would not let the crusaders leave without paying the full amount agreed to, originally 85,000 silver marks. The crusaders could only initially pay 35,000 silver marks. The Doge threatened to keep them interned unless full payment was made so a further 14,000 marks were collected, and that only by reducing the crusaders to extreme poverty. This was disastrous to the Venetians, who had halted their commerce for a great length of time to prepare this expedition. In addition, about 14,000 men or as many as 20–30,000 men (out of Venice's population of 60–100,000 people) were needed to man the entire fleet, placing further strain on the Venetian economy.

Dandolo and the Venetians considered what to do with the crusade. It was too small to pay its fee, but disbanding the force gathered would harm Venetian prestige and cause significant financial and trading loss. Dandolo, who joined the crusade during a public ceremony in the church of San Marco di Venezia, proposed that the crusaders pay their debts by intimidating many of the local ports and towns down the Adriatic, culminating in an attack on the port of Zara in Dalmatia. The city had been dominated economically by Venice throughout the 12th century but had rebelled in 1181 and allied itself with King Emeric of Hungary and Croatia. Subsequent Venetian attempts to recover control of Zara had been repulsed, and by 1202 the city was economically independent, under the protection of the King.

King Emeric was Catholic and had himself taken the cross in 1195 or 1196. Many of the crusaders were opposed to attacking Zara, and some, including a force led by the elder Simon V de Montfort, refused to participate altogether and returned home or went to the Holy Land on their own. While the Papal legate to the Crusade, Cardinal Peter of Capua, endorsed the move as necessary to prevent the crusade's complete failure, the Pope was alarmed at this development and wrote a letter to the crusading leadership threatening excommunication.

In 1202, Pope Innocent III, despite wanting to secure papal authority over the Roman Orthodox Church, forbade the crusaders of Western Christendom from committing any atrocious acts against their Christian neighbours. However, this letter, delivered by Peter of Lucedio, may not have reached the army in time. The bulk of the army arrived at Zara on 10–11 November 1202 and the attack proceeded. The citizens of Zara made reference to the fact that they were fellow Catholics by hanging banners marked with crosses from their windows and the walls of the city, but nevertheless the city fell on 24 November 1202 after a brief siege. There was extensive pillaging, and the Venetians and other crusaders came to blows over the division of the spoils. Order was achieved, and the leaders of the expedition agreed to winter in Zara, while considering their next move. The fortifications of Zara were demolished by the Venetians.

When Innocent III heard of the sack, he sent a letter to the crusaders excommunicating them and ordering them to return to their holy vows and head for Jerusalem. Out of fear that this would dissolve the army, the leaders of the crusade decided not to inform their followers of this. Regarding the Crusaders as having been coerced by the Venetians, in February 1203 he rescinded the excommunications against all non-Venetians in the expedition.

=== Decision to go to Constantinople ===
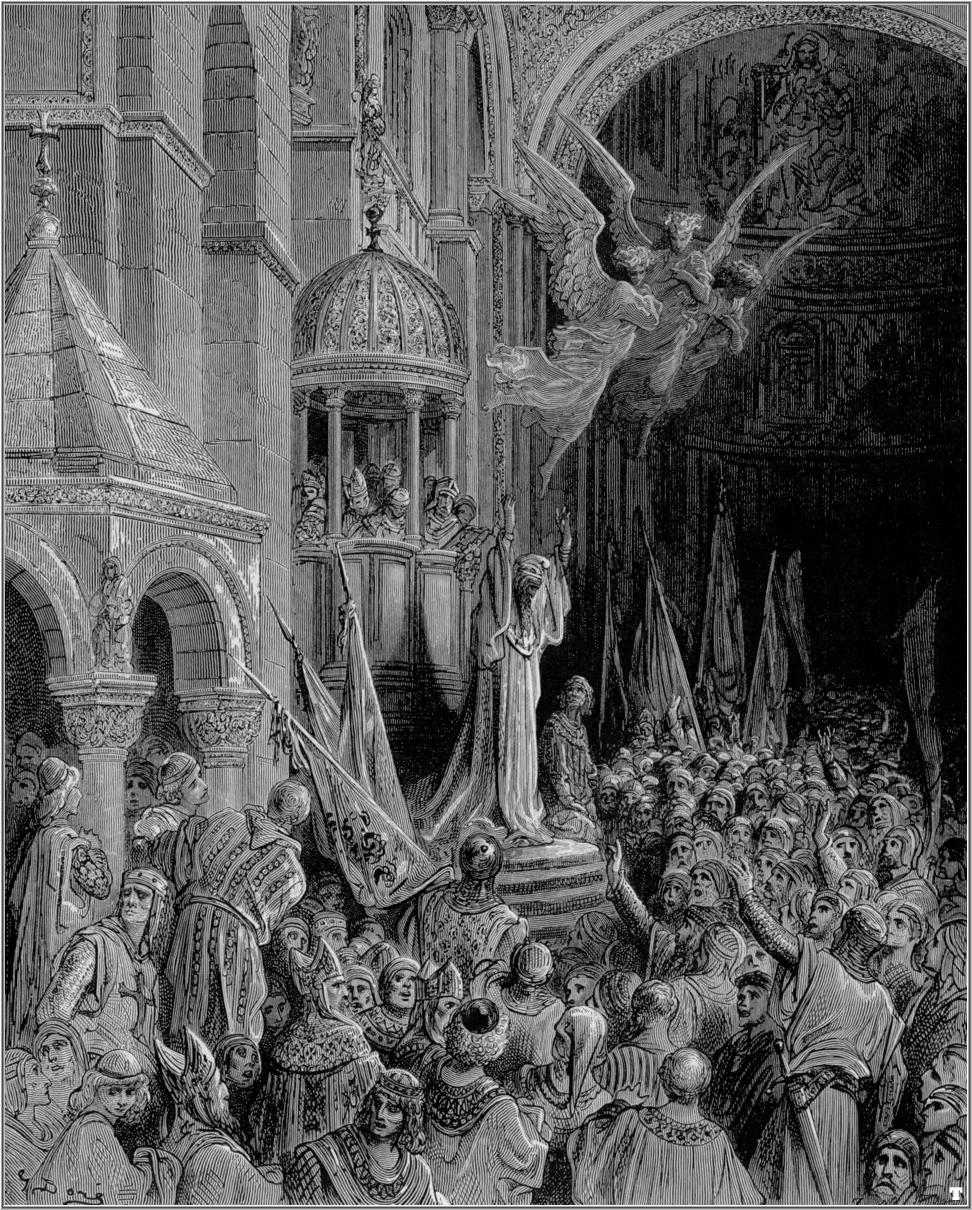
Dandolo Preaching the Crusade by Gustave Doré

The commercial rivalry between the Republic of Venice and the Byzantine Empire and the living memory of the Massacre of the Latins did much to exacerbate the feeling of animosity among the Venetians towards the Byzantine Greeks. According to the Chronicle of Novgorod Doge Enrico Dandolo had been blinded by the Emperor Manuel I Komnenos the Great while part of an embassy to Constantinople in 1171, and accordingly held personal enmity towards the Byzantines.

Boniface of Montferrat, meanwhile, had left the fleet before it sailed from Venice, to visit his cousin Philip of Swabia. The reasons for his visit are a matter of debate; he may have realized the Venetians' plans and left to avoid excommunication, or he may have wanted to meet with the Roman prince Alexios IV Angelos, Philip's brother-in-law and the son of the recently deposed Roman emperor Isaac II Angelos. Alexios IV had recently fled to Philip in 1201 but it is unknown whether or not Boniface knew he was at Philip's court. There, Alexios IV offered to pay the entire debt owed to the Venetians, give 200,000 silver marks to the crusaders, 10,000 Byzantine professional troops for the Crusade, the maintenance of 500 knights in the Holy Land, the service of the Byzantine navy to transport the Crusader Army to Egypt, and the placement of the Eastern Orthodox Church under the authority of the Pope, if they would sail to Constantinople and topple the reigning emperor Alexios III Angelos, brother of Isaac II. This offer, tempting for an enterprise that was short on funds, reached the leaders of the Crusade on 1 January 1203 as they wintered at Zara.

Doge Dandolo was a fierce supporter of the plan; however, in his earlier capacity as an ambassador to the Byzantine Empire and someone who knew the finer details of how the empire's politics worked, it is likely he knew the promises were false and there was no hope of any Byzantine emperor raising the money promised, let alone raising the troops and giving the church to the Holy See. Count Boniface agreed and Alexios IV returned with the Marquess to rejoin the fleet at Corfu after it had sailed from Zara. Most of the rest of the crusade's leaders, encouraged by bribes from Dandolo, eventually accepted the plan as well. However, there were dissenters. Led by Renaud of Montmirail, those who refused to take part in the scheme to attack Constantinople sailed on to Syria. The remaining fleet of 60 war galleys, 100 horse transports, and 50 large transports (the entire fleet was manned by 10,000 Venetian oarsmen and marines) sailed in late April 1203. In addition, 300 siege engines were brought along on board the fleet. Hearing of their decision, the Pope hedged and issued an order against any more attacks on Christians unless they were actively hindering the Crusader cause, but he did not condemn the scheme outright.

=== Defences of Constantinople ===
When the Fourth Crusade arrived at Constantinople on 23 June 1203, the city had a population of approximately 500,000 people, a garrison of 15,000 men (including 5,000 Varangians), and a fleet of 20 galleys. For both political and financial reasons, the permanent garrison of Constantinople had been limited to a relatively small force, made up of elite guards and other specialist units. At previous times in East Roman and Byzantine history when the capital had come under direct threat, it had been possible to assemble reinforcements from frontier and provincial forces. On this occasion, the suddenness of the danger posed by the Fourth Crusade put the defenders at a serious disadvantage. The main objective of the crusaders was to place Alexios IV on the Byzantine throne so that they could receive the rich payments he had promised them. Conon of Bethune delivered this ultimatum to the Lombard envoy sent by the Emperor Alexios III Angelos, who was the pretender's uncle and had seized the throne from the pretender's father Isaac II. The citizens of Constantinople were not concerned with the cause of the deposed emperor and his exiled son; hereditary right of succession had never been adopted by the empire and a palace coup between brothers was not considered illegitimate in the way it would have been in the West. First the crusaders attacked and were repulsed from the cities of Chalcedon and Chrysopolis, suburbs of the great city. They won a cavalry skirmish in which they were outnumbered, defeating 500 Byzantines with just 80 Frankish knights.

=== Siege of July 1203 ===
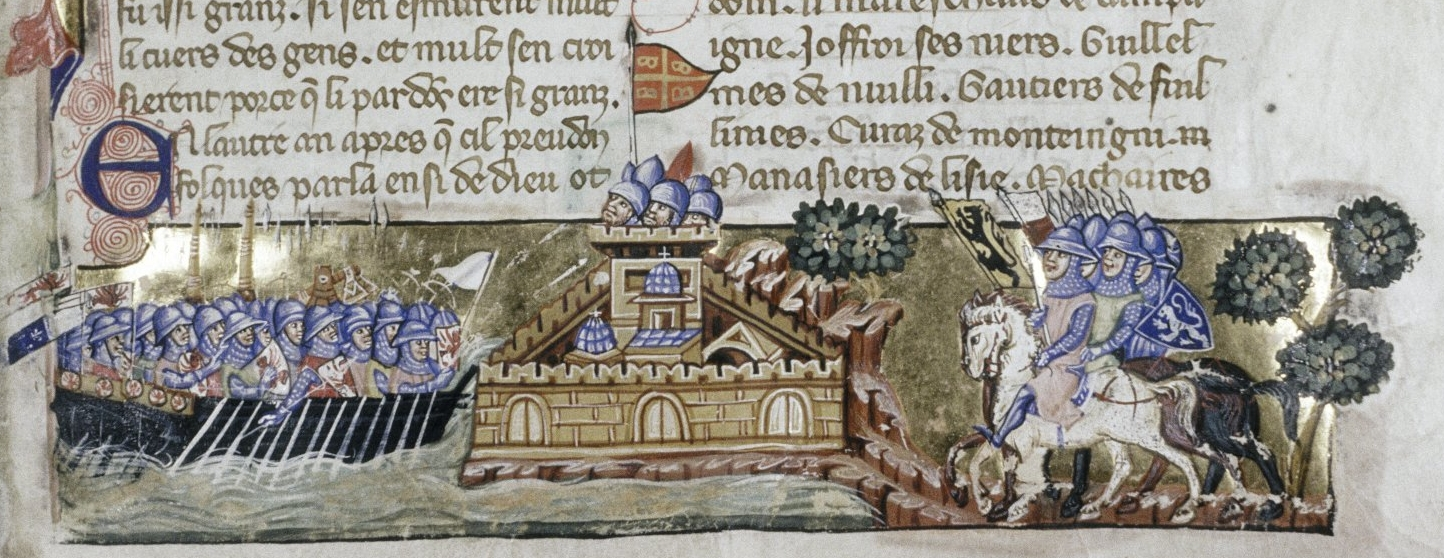
The Crusader attack on Constantinople, from a Venetian manuscript of Geoffrey de Villehardouin's history, c. 1330

To take the city by force, the crusaders first needed to cross the Bosphorus. About 200 ships, horse transports, and galleys delivered the crusading army across the narrow strait, where Alexios III had lined up the Byzantine army in battle formation along the shore, north of the suburb of Galata. The Crusader knights charged straight out of the horse transports, and the Byzantine army fled south. The Crusaders followed and attacked the Tower of Galata, which held the northern end of the massive chain that blocked access to the Golden Horn. The Tower of Galata held a garrison of mercenary troops of English, Danish, and Italian origin. On 6 July the largest ship in the crusaders' fleet, the Aquila (Eagle), broke the chain. A section of it was then sent to Acre to boost the defences in the Holy Land.

As the crusaders laid siege to the Tower of Galata, the defenders routinely attempted to sally out with some limited success, but often suffered bloody losses. On one occasion the defenders sallied out but were unable to retreat back to the safety of the tower in time, the Crusader forces viciously counterattacked, with most of the defenders being cut down or drowning in the Bosporus in their attempts to escape. The tower was swiftly taken as a result. The Golden Horn now lay open to the Crusaders, and the Venetian fleet entered. The Crusaders sailed alongside Constantinople with 10 galleys to display the would-be Alexios IV, but from the walls of the city citizens taunted the puzzled crusaders, who had been led to believe that they would rise up to welcome the young pretender Alexios as a liberator.

On 11 July, the Crusaders took positions opposite the Palace of Blachernae on the northwest corner of the city. Their first attacks were repulsed, but on 17 July, with four divisions attacking the land walls while the Venetian fleet attacked the sea walls from the Golden Horn, the Venetians took a section of the wall of about 25 towers, while the Varangian guard held off the Crusaders on the land wall. The Varangians shifted to meet the new threat, and the Venetians retreated under the screen of fire. The fire destroyed about 120 acres (0.49 km^{2}) of the city and left some 20,000 people homeless.

Alexios III finally took offensive action, leading 17 divisions from the St. Romanus Gate, vastly outnumbering the crusaders. Alexios III's army of about 8,500 men faced the Crusaders' seven divisions (about 3,500 men), but his courage failed, and the Byzantine army returned to the city without a fight. The unforced retreat and the effects of the fire greatly damaged morale, and the disgraced Alexios III abandoned his subjects, slipping out of the city and fleeing to Mosynopolis in Thrace. The Imperial officials quickly deposed their runaway emperor and restored Isaac II, robbing the crusaders of the pretext for attack. The crusaders were now in the quandary of having achieved their stated aim while being debarred from the actual objective, namely the reward that the younger Alexios had (unbeknownst to the Romans) promised them. The crusaders insisted that they would only recognize the authority of Isaac II if his son was raised to co-emperor, and on 1 August the latter was crowned as Alexios Angelos IV, co-emperor.

=== Reign of Alexios IV ===
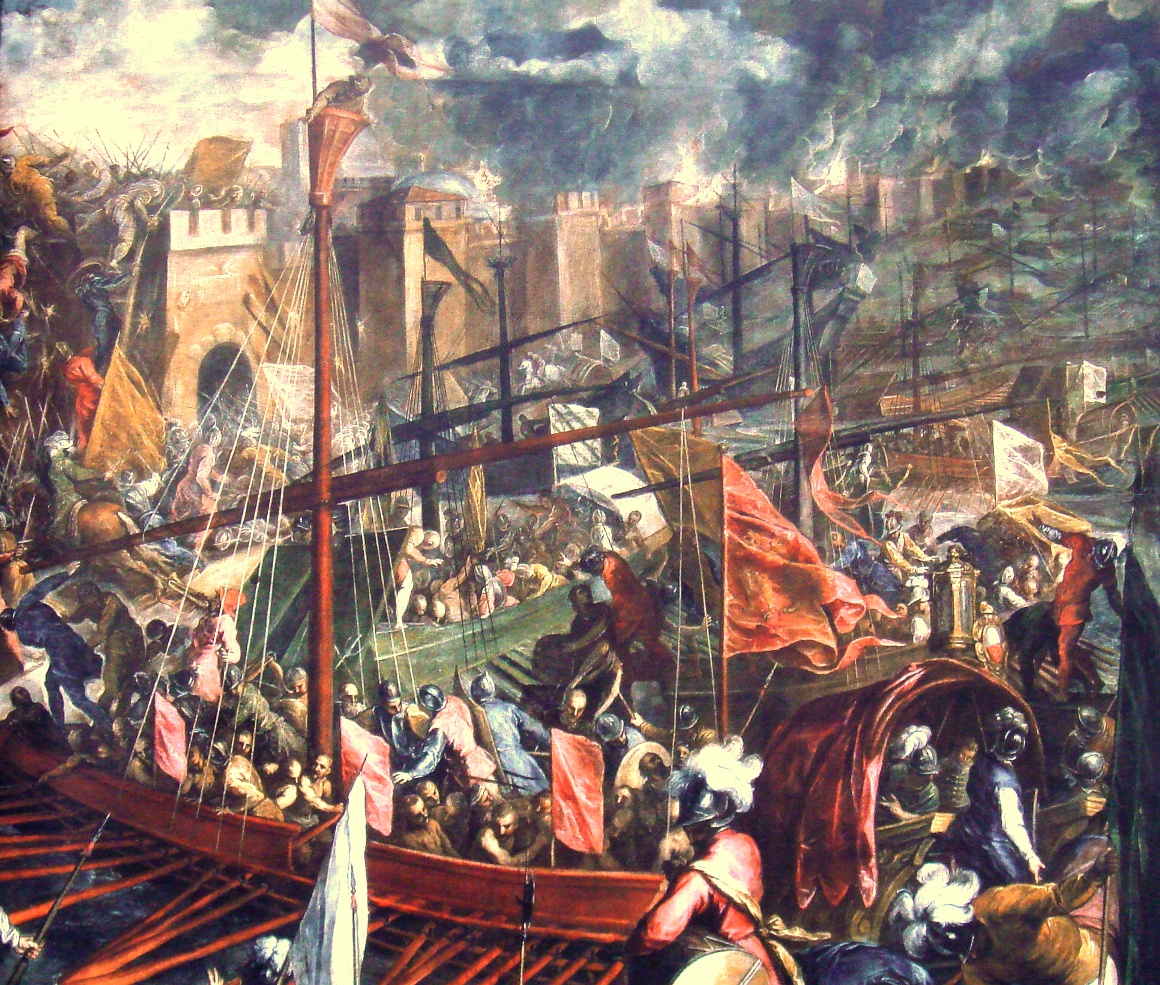
Capture of Constantinople by the Fourth Crusade in 1204

Alexios IV realised that his promises were hard to keep. Alexios III had managed to flee with 1,000 pounds of gold and some priceless jewels, leaving the imperial treasury short on funds. At that point the young emperor ordered the destruction and melting of valuable Roman icons in order to extract their gold and silver, but even then he could only raise 100,000 silver marks. In the eyes of all Greeks who knew of this decision, it was a shocking sign of desperation and weak leadership, which deserved to be punished by God. The Byzantine historian Nicetas Choniates characterized it as "the turning point towards the decline of the Roman state".

Forcing the populace to destroy their icons at the behest of an army of foreign schismatics did not endear Alexios IV to the citizens of Constantinople. In fear of his life, the co-emperor asked the crusaders to renew their contract for another six months, to end by April 1204. Alexios IV then led 6,000 men from the Crusader army against his rival Alexios III in Adrianople. During the co-emperor's absence in August, rioting broke out in the city and a number of Latin residents were killed. In retaliation armed Venetians and other crusaders entered the city from the Golden Horn and attacked a mosque (Constantinople at this time had a sizable Muslim population), which was defended by Muslim and Byzantine Greek residents. In order to cover their retreat the Westerners instigated the "Great Fire", which burnt from 19 to 21 August, destroying a large part of Constantinople and leaving an estimated 100,000 homeless.

In January 1204, the blinded and incapacitated Isaac II died, probably of natural causes. Opposition to his son and co-emperor Alexios IV had grown during the preceding months of tension and spasmodic violence in and around Constantinople. The Byzantine Senate elected a young noble Nicolas Canabus as emperor, in what was to be one of the last known acts of this ancient institution. However he declined the appointment and sought church sanctuary.

A nobleman Alexios Doukas (nicknamed Mourtzouphlos) became the leader of the anti-crusader faction within the Byzantine leadership. While holding the court rank of protovestilarios, Doukas had led Byzantine forces during the initial clashes with the crusaders, winning respect from both military and populace. He was accordingly well-placed to move against the increasingly isolated Alexios IV, whom he overthrew, imprisoned, and had strangled in early February. Doukas then was crowned as Emperor Alexios V Doukas Mourtzouphlos. He immediately moved to have the city fortifications strengthened and summoned additional forces to the city.

=== War against Alexios V ===
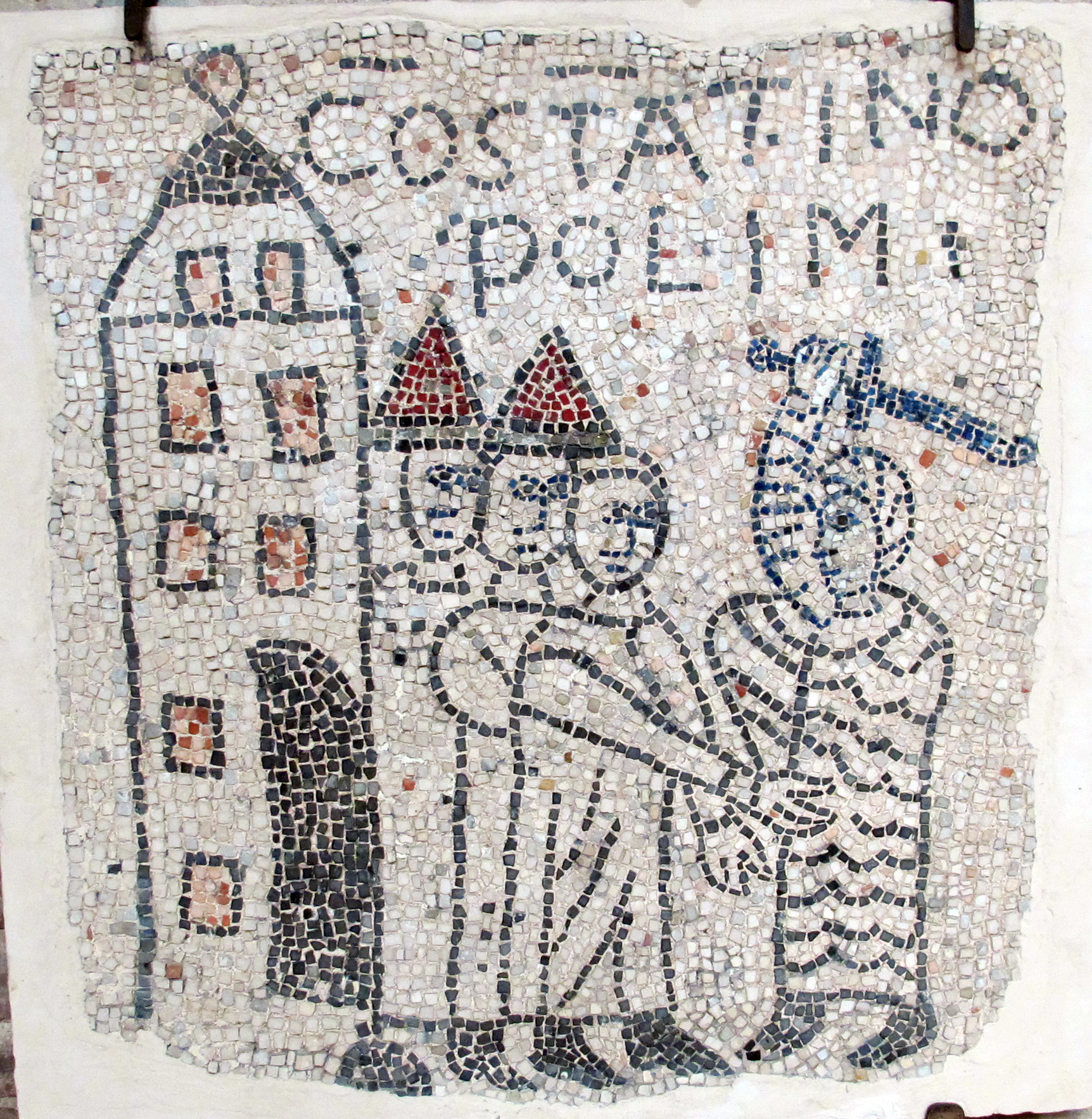
Venetian mosaic from 1213 depicting the fall of Constantinople

The crusaders and Venetians, incensed at the murder of their supposed patron, demanded that Mourtzouphlos honour the contract that Alexios IV had promised. When the emperor refused, the Crusaders assaulted the city once again. On 8 April Alexios V's army put up a strong resistance, which did much to discourage the Crusaders. The Byzantines hurled large projectiles onto the enemy siege engines, shattering many of them. Bad weather conditions were a serious hindrance to the crusaders. A fierce wind blew from the shore and prevented most of the ships from drawing close enough to the walls to launch an assault. Only five of the wall's towers were actually engaged and none of these could be secured; by mid-afternoon it was evident that the attack had failed.

The Latin clergy discussed the situation amongst themselves and settled upon the message they wished to spread through the demoralised army. They had to convince the men that the events of 9 April were not God's judgment on a sinful enterprise: the campaign, they argued, was righteous and with proper belief it would succeed. The concept of God testing the determination of the crusaders through temporary setbacks was a familiar means for the clergy to explain failure in the course of a campaign. The clergy's message was designed to reassure and encourage the Crusaders. Their argument that the attack on Constantinople was spiritual revolved around two themes. First, the Greeks were traitors and murderers since they had killed their rightful lord, Alexios IV. The churchmen used inflammatory language and claimed that "the Greeks were worse than the Jews", and they invoked the authority of God and the pope to take action.

Although Innocent III had again demanded that they not attack, the papal letter was suppressed by the clergy, and the crusaders prepared for their own attack, while the Venetians attacked from the sea. Alexios V's army stayed in the city to fight, but when the unpaid Varangians left the city, Alexios V himself fled during the night. An attempt was made to find a further replacement emperor from amongst the Byzantine Greek nobility, but the situation had now become too chaotic for either of the two candidates who came forward to find sufficient support.

On 12 April 1204, the weather conditions finally favoured the crusaders. A strong northern wind aided the Venetian ships in coming close to the walls and after a short battle approximately seventy crusaders managed to enter the city. Some were able to knock holes in the walls, large enough for only a few knights at a time to crawl through; the Venetians were also successful at scaling the walls from the sea, though there was fighting with the Byzantine infantry. The remaining Anglo-Saxon "axe bearers" had been amongst the most effective of the city's defenders, but they now attempted to negotiate higher wages from their Byzantine employers, before dispersing or surrendering. The crusaders captured the Blachernae section of the city in the northwest and used it as a base to attack the rest of the city. While attempting to defend themselves with a wall of fire, however, they burned even more of the city. This second fire left 15,000 people homeless. The crusaders completely took the city on 13 April.

=== Sack of Constantinople ===
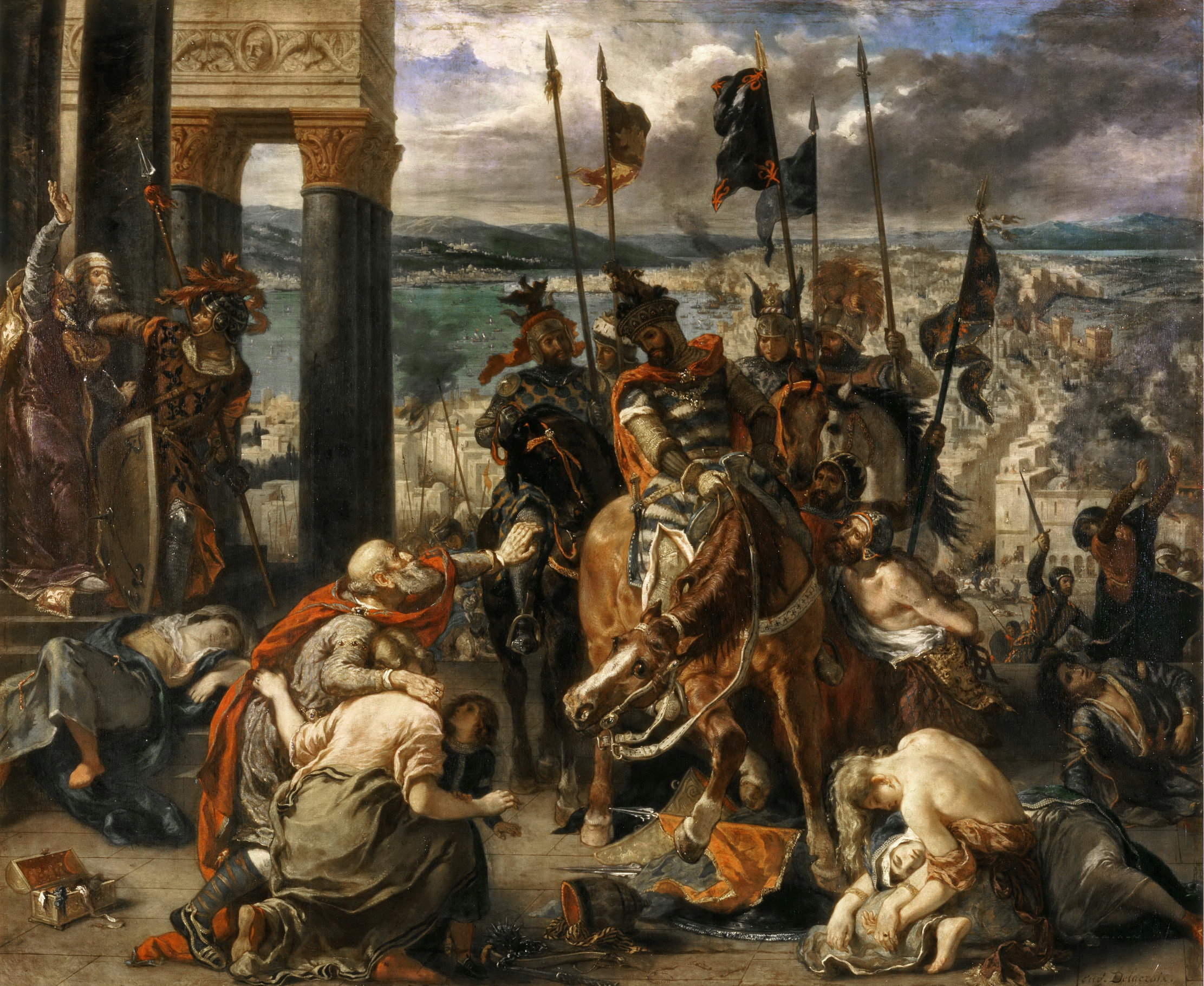
The Entry of the Crusaders into Constantinople (Eugène Delacroix, 1840). The most infamous action of the Fourth Crusade was the sack of the Orthodox Christian city of Constantinople.

The crusaders sacked Constantinople for three days, during which many ancient and medieval Greco-Roman works of art were stolen or ruined. Many of the civilian population of the city were killed and their property looted. Despite the threat of excommunication, the crusaders destroyed, defiled and looted the city's churches and monasteries. It was said that the total amount looted from Constantinople was about 900,000 silver marks. The Venetians received 150,000 silver marks that were their due, while the crusaders received 50,000 silver marks. A further 100,000 silver marks were divided evenly up between the crusaders and Venetians. The remaining 500,000 silver marks were secretly kept back by many crusader knights. The eyewitness accounts of Niketas Choniates, Geoffrey of Villehardouin, Robert of Clari, and the anonymous Latin author of the Devastatio Constantinopolitana all accuse the crusaders of egregious rapacity.

Speros Vryonis in Byzantium and Europe gives a vivid account of the sack:

The Latin soldiery subjected the greatest city in Europe to an indescribable sack. For three days they murdered, raped, looted and destroyed on a scale which even the ancient Vandals and Goths would have found unbelievable. Constantinople had become a veritable museum of ancient and Byzantine art, an emporium of such incredible wealth that the Latins were astounded at the riches they found. Though the Venetians had an appreciation for the art which they discovered (they were themselves semi-Byzantines) and saved much of it, the French and others destroyed indiscriminately, halting to refresh themselves with wine, violation of nuns, and murder of Orthodox clerics. The Crusaders vented their hatred for the Greeks most spectacularly in the desecration of the greatest Church in Christendom. They smashed the silver iconostasis, the icons and the holy books of Hagia Sophia, and seated upon the patriarchal throne a whore who sang coarse songs as they drank wine from the Church's holy vessels. The estrangement of East and West, which had proceeded over the centuries, culminated in the horrible massacre that accompanied the conquest of Constantinople. The Greeks were convinced that even the Turks, had they taken the city, would not have been as cruel as the Latin Christians. The defeat of Byzantium, already in a state of decline, accelerated political degeneration so that the Byzantines eventually became easy prey to the Turks. The Fourth Crusade and the crusading movement generally thus resulted, ultimately, in the victory of Islam, a result which was of course the exact opposite of its original intention.

When Innocent III heard of the conduct of his pilgrims he was filled with shame and rage, and he strongly rebuked them.

== Holy Land ==
The main army that sailed from Venice to Constantinople experienced several waves of defections as men sought to fulfill their vows independently of the leadership. Most of them sailed directly from ports in Apulia (southern Italy) to Acre. According to Villehardouin, the majority of those who set out on the Fourth Crusade went to the Holy Land, while only a minority participated in the attack on Constantinople. Villehardouin, however, regarded those who went to the Holy Land as deserters of the main army and its leadership and he may have exaggerated their number in order to magnify the accomplishments of the minority that besieged Constantinople.

Modern historians have tended to disregard Villehardouin's claims. Steven Runciman thought that only a "tiny proportion" and Joshua Prawer only some "pitiful remnants" of the original army arrived in the Holy Land. Recent studies suggest that the number was substantial but shy of a majority. Of the 92 named individuals who took the crusader vow in Villehardouin's account, between 23 and 26 of them went to the Holy Land. The rate of "desertion" seems highest among the French faction. Only about a tenth of the knights who had taken the cross in Flanders arrived to reinforce the remaining Christian states in the Holy Land, but over half of those from the Île-de-France did. All told, about 300 knights with their retinues from northern France made it to the Holy Land. Of the contingents from Burgundy, Occitania, Italy and Germany there is less information, but there were certainly defections among the Occitan and German contingents.

A large sum of money raised by the preacher Fulk of Neuilly did reach the Holy Land. Before his death in May 1202, Fulk gave the money to the Abbey of Cîteaux. Abbot Arnaud Amalric sent it to Acre in two installments. It was used to repair walls, towers and other defences that had been damaged by the earthquake of May 1202. A second wall was even added at Acre sometime before 1212.

=== Apulia to Acre ===
Several crusaders, instead of going on to Venice, turned south at Piacenza in the summer of 1202 intending to go directly to the Holy Land from ports in southern Italy. Among them were Vilain of Nully, Henry of Arzillières, Renard II of Dampierre, Henry of Longchamp and Giles of Trasignies with their retinues. They do not seem to have been acting in concert or travelling together. Ultimately, several hundred knights and accompanying infantry reached the Holy Land via south Italian ports. The force was so small that King Aimery of Jerusalem refused to break his truce with the Ayyubids to allow them to go to war, despite the pleas of Renard, who was fulfilling the crusading vow of the late Count Theobald III of Champagne and possessed ample funds. As a result, eighty crusaders under Renard decided to go to the Principality of Antioch, which had no such truce. Advised against such a move, they were ambushed on the road and all but Renard were killed or captured. Renard remained in captivity for thirty years.

When the crusade was diverted to Zara, many crusaders returned home or else remained behind in Italy. Some bypassed the Venetian fleet and found other means of going to the Holy Land. Geoffrey of Villehardouin, the historian's nephew, was one of them. Stephen of the Perche, was prevented from going with the main army on account of illness. Upon his recovery in March 1203, he took ship in southern Italy and travelled directly to the Holy Land with many others who had remained behind, including Rotrou de Montfort and Yves of La Jaille. Stephen re-joined the main army after the fall of Constantinople.

Following the siege of Zara, more contingents abandoned the main army. The crusaders sent Robert of Boves as an envoy to the pope, but after his mission was done he went straight to the Holy Land. Abbot Martin of Pairis joined him on the trip to Rome and afterwards took ship for Palestine at Siponto. Martin arrived in Acre on 25 April 1203 in the midst of an outbreak of plague. According to the Devastatio Constantinopolitana, after the decision was made at Zara to place Alexios IV on the throne of Constantinople, the leaders of the crusade granted permission for about 1,000 men to leave and find their own way to the Holy Land. In fact, about 2,000 men abandoned the main army at that stage. Most of them were among the poorer crusaders, and two ships carrying them sank with loss of life. The German crusader Garnier of Borland also abandoned the main army after Zara.

From Zara, an official embassy, led by Renaud of Montmirail, was dispatched to the Holy Land. It included Hervé of Châtel, William III of Ferrières, Geoffrey of Beaumont and the brothers John and Peter of Frouville. They were supposed to return to the main army within fifteen days of accomplishing their mission. In fact, they remained in the Holy Land and did not return until after the fall of Constantinople.

In the winter of 1203–1204, de Montfort led a large contingent of defectors disgusted with the attack on Zara and opposed to the Constantinople venture. He and his men had even avoided the ruins of Zara and camped in Hungary. Among Simon's followers were his brother, Guy de Montfort; the Yvelinois Simon V of Neauphle, Robert IV Mauvoisin and Dreux II of Cressonsacq; Abbot Guy of Vaux-de-Cernay; and the unnamed abbot of Cercanceaux. Shortly afterwards they were joined by Enguerrand II of Boves. They marched up the coast from Zara back to Italy and then down the Italian coast, where they embarked for Palestine.

=== Flemish fleet ===
For reasons unknown, Baldwin of Flanders divided his forces, leading half to Venice himself and sending the other half by sea. The Flemish fleet left Flanders in the summer of 1202 under the command of John II of Nesle, Thierry of Flanders and Nicholas of Mailly. (Note: Nicholas of Mailly joined the main army after the fall of Constantinople.) It sailed into the Mediterranean and, according to the chronicler Ernoul, attacked and captured an unnamed Muslim city on the African coast. The city was left in the hands of the Livonian Brothers of the Sword and the fleet went on to Marseille, where it wintered in 1202–1203. There the fleet was joined by a number of French crusaders, including Bishop Walter II of Autun, Count Guigues III of Forez, Bernard IV of Moreuil, Henry of Arraines, Hugh of Chaumont, John of Villers, Peter Bromont and the brothers Walter and Hugh of Saint-Denis and their retinues.

The pilots of Marseille had more experience sailing out of sight of land than those of any other Mediterranean port, having been doing it since the mid-12th century. In summer, they could make the trip to Acre in fifteen days. They possessed a fleet sufficient to transport the army of Richard the Lionheart on the Third Crusade in 1190. It was also a cheaper and more accessible port for the French contingent.

Baldwin sent orders to his fleet in Marseille to sail at the end of March 1203 and rendezvous with the Venetian fleet off Methoni. (Note: Baldwin of Flanders' wife, Marie of Champagne, sailed from Marseille to Acre in the spring of 1204. She was there when she learned of his election as emperor.) His messengers must also have brought news of the decision to go to Constantinople before proceeding to the Holy Land. For this reason the Flemish leaders may have opted to ignore the rendezvous and sail directly to Acre. It is also possible that they kept the rendezvous, but not finding the Venetian fleet (which did not get to Methoni before May) went on to Acre alone. They probably arrived there before Martin of Pairis on 25 April 1203. At least a part of the fleet stopped at Cyprus, where Thierry of Flanders made a claim on the island in the name of his wife, the Damsel of Cyprus, daughter of Isaac Doukas Komnenos, former emperor of Cyprus. Thierry, his wife and those knights that had supported him were ordered by Aimery to leave his kingdom, so they went to the Kingdom of Armenia, homeland of Thierry's mother-in-law.

The Flemish crusaders in Acre encountered the same difficulty as Renard of Dampierre. King Aimery was unwilling to break his truce for the sake of such a small army. The crusaders, therefore, split up. Some entered the service of the Principality of Antioch and others that of the County of Tripoli. Bernard of Moreuil and John of Villers joined Renard of Dampierre and were captured along with him. John of Nesle went to the aid of Armenia and thus found himself fighting some of his former comrades, since Armenia and Antioch were then at war. Sometime before 5 November 1203, however, the truce was broken. The Muslims seized two Christian ships and in retaliation, the Christians had seized six Muslim ships. The Flemish crusaders returned to the Kingdom of Jerusalem to fight.

On 8 November, Martin of Pairis and Conrad of Swartzenberg were sent to the main army, then besieging Constantinople, to press for it to continue on to the Holy Land now that the truce was broken. The envoys arrived on 1 January 1204, but the army was in the midst of heavy fighting and nothing came of their embassy.

Assessing the disastrous results of the expedition he had started, Pope Innocent III spoke against the crusaders thus:

How, indeed, will the church of the Greeks, no matter how severely she is beset with affIictions and persecutions, return into ecclesiastical union and to a devotion for the Apostolic See, when she has seen in the Latins only an example of perdition and the works of darkness, so that she now, and with reason, detests the Latins more than dogs? As for those who were supposed to be seeking the ends of Jesus Christ, not their own ends, who made their swords, which they were supposed to use against the pagans, drip with Christian blood, they have spared neither religion, nor age, nor sex. They have committed incest, adultery, and fornication before the eyes of men. They have exposed both matrons and virgins, even those dedicated to God, to the sordid lusts of boys. Not satisfied with breaking open the imperial treasury and plundering the goods of princes and lesser men, they also laid their hands on the treasures of the churches and, what is more serious, on their very possessions. They have even ripped silver plates from the altars and have hacked them to pieces among themselves. They violated the holy places and have carried off crosses and relics.

== Aftermath: partition of the Byzantine Empire ==
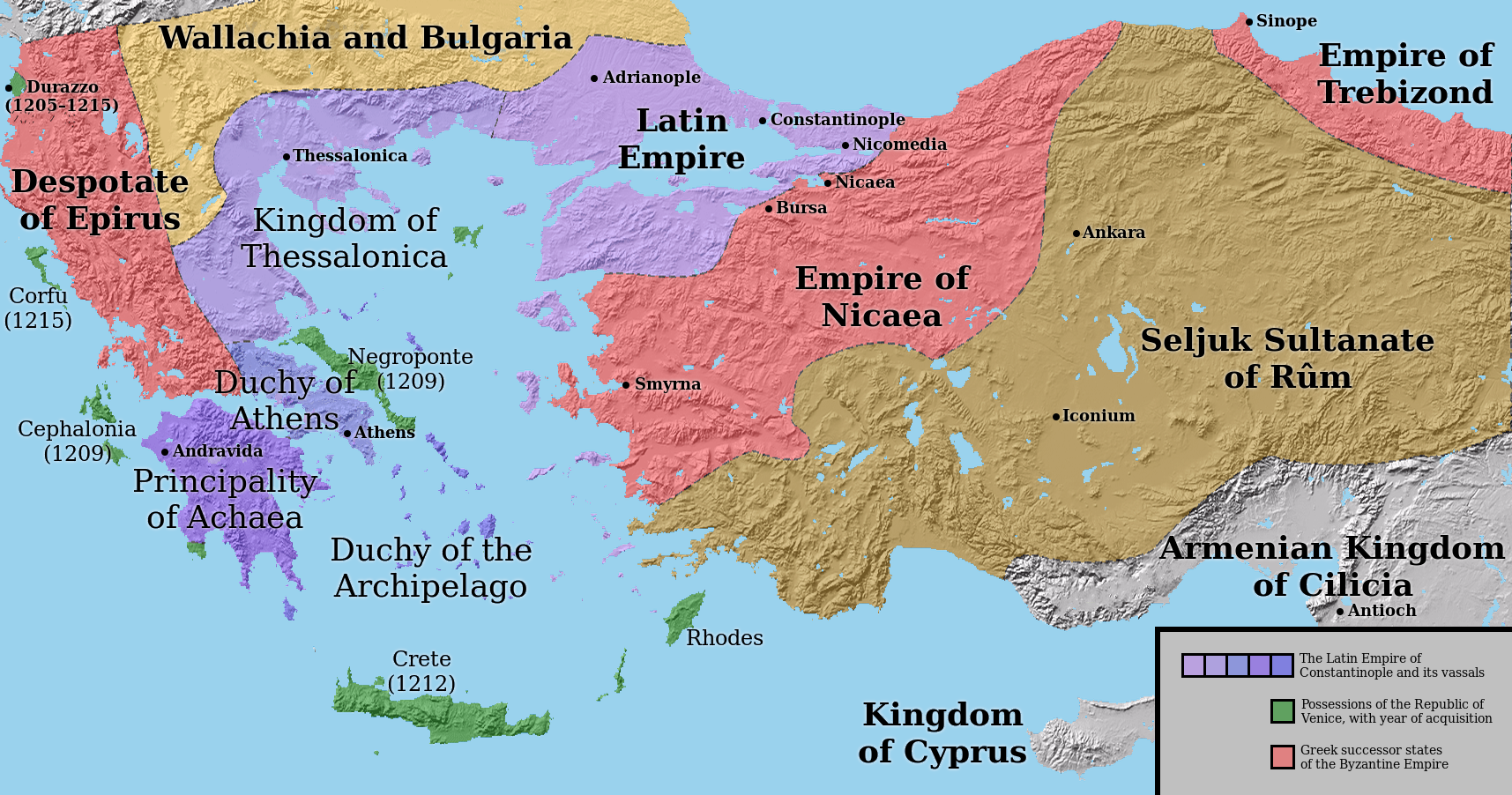
Partition of the Byzantine Empire into The Latin Empire and its Crusader Vassals, Empire of Nicaea, Trapezuntine Empire, and Despotate of Epirus after 1204

The Byzantine Empire was apportioned between Venice and the leaders of the Crusade according to a treaty; establishing the Latin Empire based in Constantinople. Boniface was not elected as the new emperor, although the citizens seemed to consider him as such; the Venetians thought he had too many connections with the former empire because of his brother, Renier of Montferrat, who had been married to Maria Komnene, empress in the 1170s and 1180s and also because they thought that Boniface would favor the Genoese more than the Venetians as Montferrat was on Genoa's northern border. Instead, they placed Baldwin of Flanders on the throne. Boniface went on to found the Kingdom of Thessalonica, a vassal state of the new Latin Empire. The Venetians also founded the Duchy of the Archipelago in the Aegean Sea. Meanwhile, Byzantine refugees founded their own rump states, the most notable of these being the Empire of Nicaea under Theodore Laskaris (a relative of Alexios III), the Empire of Trebizond, and the Despotate of Epirus. This was known as the Partitio terrarum imperii Romaniae in Latin.

=== Venetian colonies ===
The Republic of Venice accumulated several possessions in Greece, which formed part of its Stato da Màr. Some of them survived until the fall of the Republic itself in 1797:

- Crete, also known as Candia, (1211–1669), one of the Republic's most important overseas possessions, despite frequent revolts by the Greek population, it was retained until captured by the Ottomans in the Cretan War.
- Corfu (1207–1214 and 1386–1797), was captured by Venice from its Genoese ruler shortly after the Fourth Crusade. The island was soon retaken by the Despotate of Epirus, but captured in 1258 by the Kingdom of Sicily. The island remained under Angevin rule until 1386, when Venice reimposed its control, which would last until the end of the Republic itself.
- Lefkas (1684–1797), originally part of the Palatine county and the Orsini-ruled Despotate of Epirus, it came under Ottoman rule in 1479, and was conquered by the Venetians in 1684, during the Morean War.
- Zakynthos (1479–1797), originally part of the Palatine county and the Orsini-ruled Despotate of Epirus, it fell to Venice in 1479
- Cephalonia and Ithaca (1500–1797), originally part of the Palatine county and the Orsini-ruled Despotate of Epirus, they came under Ottoman rule in 1479, and were conquered by the Venetians in December 1500.
- Tinos and Mykonos, bequeathed to Venice in 1390, and lost to the Ottomans in 1715 and 1537 respectively.
- various coastal fortresses in the Peloponnese and mainland Greece:
  - Modon (Methoni) and Coron (Koroni), occupied in 1207, confirmed by the Treaty of Sapienza, and held until taken by the Ottomans in August 1500.
  - Nauplia (Italian Napoli di Romania), acquired through the purchase of the lordship of Argos and Nauplia in 1388, held until captured by the Ottomans in 1540.
  - Argos, acquired through the purchase of the lordship of Argos and Nauplia but seized by the Despotate of the Morea and not handed over to Venice until June 1394, held until captured by the Ottomans in 1462.
  - Athens, acquired in 1394 from the heirs of Nerio I Acciaioli, but lost to the latter's bastard son Antonio in 1402–03, a fact recognized by the Republic in a treaty in 1405.
  - Parga, port town on the coast of Epirus, acquired in 1401. It was governed as a dependency of Corfu, and remained so even after the end of the Venetian Republic in 1797, finally being ceded by the British to Ali Pasha in 1819.
  - Lepanto (Naupaktos), port in Aetolia, briefly seized by a Venetian captain in 1390, in 1394 its inhabitants offered to hand it over to Venice, but were rebuffed. Finally sold to Venice in 1407 by its Albanian ruler, Paul Spata, lost to the Ottomans in 1540.
  - Patras, held in 1408–13 and 1417–19 in lease, for 1,000 ducats per year, from the Latin Archbishop of Patras, who thus hoped to thwart a Turkish or Byzantine takeover of the city.
  - The Northern Sporades (Skiathos, Skopelos, and Alonissos), were Byzantine possessions that came under Venetian rule after the Fall of Constantinople in 1453. They were captured by the Ottomans under Hayreddin Barbarossa in 1538.
  - Monemvasia (Malvasia), a Byzantine outpost left unconquered by the Ottomans in 1460, it accepted Venetian rule, until captured by the Ottomans in 1540.
  - Vonitsa on the coast of Epirus, captured in 1684 and held as a mainland exclave of the Ionian Islands until the end of the Republic.
  - Preveza on the coast of Epirus, occupied during the Morean War (1684–1699), recaptured in 1717 and held as a mainland exclave of the Ionian Islands until the end of the Republic.
- The whole of the Peloponnese or Morea peninsula was conquered during the Morean War in the 1680s and became a colony as the "Kingdom of the Morea", but it was lost again to the Ottomans in 1715.

=== Genoese colonies ===
Genoese attempts to occupy Corfu and Crete in the aftermath of the Fourth Crusade were thwarted by the Venetians. It was only during the 14th century, exploiting the terminal decline of the Byzantine Empire under the Palaiologos dynasty, and often in agreement with the weakened Eastern Roman rulers, that various Genoese nobles established domains in the northeastern Aegean:

- The Gattilusi family established a number of fiefs, under nominal Eastern Roman suzerainty, over the island of Lesbos (1355–1462) and later the islands of Lemnos, Thasos (1414–1462) and Samothrace (1355–1457), as well as the Thracian town of Ainos (1376–1456).
- The Lordship of Chios, consisting of the twin cities of New and Old Phocaea, Samos, Ikaria, and Chios as its capital. From 1304 to 1329 under the Zaccaria family, and, after an Eastern Roman interlude, from 1346 and until the Ottoman conquest in 1566 under the Maona di Chio e di Focea company.

=== Crusader colonies ===
Map of the Greek and Latin states in southern Greece ca. 1278

The Latin Empire and the 4th Crusade's leaders all created their own kingdoms in the Byzantine Empire.

- The Kingdom of Thessalonica (1205–1224), encompassing Macedonia and Thessaly. This kingdom was given to the leader of the 4th Crusade, Boniface of Montferrat after he lost the election of Latin Emperor to Baldwin of Flanders. Boniface would expand Latin domains south, into southern Greece. After he was killed by Bulgarians, the kingdom was almost continuously troubled by warfare with the Second Bulgarian Empire; eventually, it was conquered by the Despotate of Epirus under Theodore Komnenos Doukas. Doukas would then replace the Kingdom of Thessalonica by the Empire of Thessalonica.
- The Principality of Achaea (1205–1432/1454), encompassing the Morea or Peloponnese peninsula. It quickly emerged as the strongest state, and prospered even after the demise of the Latin Empire. Its main rival was the Byzantine Despotate of the Morea, which eventually succeeded in conquering the Principality. It also exercised suzerainty over the Lordship of Argos and Nauplia, and at one point or another, most of the other Latin states.
- The Duchy of Athens (1205–1458), with its two capitals Thebes and Athens, and encompassing Attica, Boeotia, and parts of southern Thessaly. In 1311, the Duchy was conquered by the Catalan Company, and in 1388, it passed into the hands of the Florentine Acciaiuoli family, which kept it until the Ottoman conquest in 1456.
- The Duchy of the Archipelago or of Naxos (1207–1579), founded by the Sanudo family, it encompassed most of the Cyclades. In 1383, it passed under the control of the Crispo family. The Duchy became an Ottoman vassal in 1537, and was finally annexed to the Ottoman Empire in 1579.
- Duchy of Philippopolis (1204 – after 1230), fief of the Latin Empire in northern Thrace, until its capture by the Bulgarians.
- The Marquisate of Bodonitsa (1204–1414), like Salona, was originally created as a vassal state of the Kingdom of Thessalonica, but later came under the influence of Achaea. In 1335, the Venetian Giorgi family took control, and ruled until the Ottoman conquest in 1414.
- The County of Salona (1205–1410), centred at Salona (modern Amfissa), like Bodonitsa, was formed as a vassal state of the Kingdom of Thessalonica since King of Thessalonica, Boniface of Montferrat created the county. It would later come under the influence of Achaea. It then came under Catalan and later Navarrese rule in the 14th century, before being sold to the Knights Hospitaller in 1403. It was finally conquered by the Ottomans in 1410.
- The County palatine of Cephalonia and Zakynthos (1185–1479). It encompassed the Ionian Islands of Cephalonia, Zakynthos, Ithaca, and, from around 1300, also Lefkas (Santa Maura). Created as a vassal to the Kingdom of Sicily, it was ruled by the Orsini family from 1195 to 1335, and after a short interlude of Anjou rule the county passed to the Tocco family in 1357. The county was split between Venice and the Ottomans in 1479.
- The Triarchy of Negroponte (1205–1470), encompassing the island of Negroponte (Euboea), originally a vassal of Thessalonica, then of Achaea. It was fragmented into three baronies (terzi or "triarchies") run each by two barons (the sestieri). This fragmentation enabled Venice to gain influence acting as mediators. By 1390 Venice had established direct control of the entire island, which remained in Venetian hands until 1470, when it was captured by the Ottomans.
- The Lordship of Argos and Nauplia (1212–1388) was made a lordship when after their conquest from the Byzantines in 1211–1212, the cities were granted as a fief to Otto de la Roche, duke of Athens, by Geoffrey I of Villehardouin, prince of Achaea. The lordship remained in the possession of the de la Roche and the Brienne dukes of Athens even after the conquest of the Duchy of Athens by the Catalan Company in 1311, and the Brienne line continued to be recognized as dukes of Athens there. In 1388 the two cities were sold to Venice but before Venice could take possession, Argos was seized by the Byzantine Despotate of Morea under Theodore I Palaiologos, while his ally, while the Florentine Acciaiuoli family seized Nauplia. The Nauplia was soon captured by Venice, but Argos remained in Byzantine hands until 1394, when it too was handed over to Venice.
- Rhodes became the headquarters of the military monastic order of the Knights Hospitaller of Saint John in 1310, and the Knights retained control of the island (and neighbouring islands of the Dodecanese island group) until ousted by the Ottomans in 1522.
- Lemnos, an island known to Westerners as Stalimene formed a fief of the Latin Empire under the Venetian Navigajoso family from 1207 until conquered by the Byzantines in 1278. Its rulers bore the title of megadux ("grand duke") of the Latin Empire.

== Frankokratia ==
The Frankokratia (Φραγκοκρατία, Francocratia, sometimes anglicized as Francocracy, lit. "rule of the Franks"), also known as Latinokratia (Λατινοκρατία, Latinocratia, "rule of the Latins") and, for the Venetian domains, Venetokratia or Enetokratia (Βενετοκρατία or Ενετοκρατία, Venetocratia, "rule of the Venetians"), was the period in Greek history after the Fourth Crusade when a number of primarily French and Italian states were established by the Partitio terrarum imperii Romaniae on the territory of the shattered Byzantine Empire.

The terms Frankokratia and Latinokratia derive from the name given by the Orthodox Greeks to the Western French and Italians who originated from territories that once belonged to the Frankish Empire, as this was the political entity that ruled much of the former Western Roman Empire after the collapse of Roman authority and power. The span of the Frankokratia period differs by region: the political situation proved highly volatile, as the Frankish states fragmented and changed hands, and the Greek successor states re-conquered many areas.

With the exception of the Ionian Islands and some islands or forts which remained in Venetian hands until the turn of the 19th century, the end of the Frankokratia in most Greek lands came with the Ottoman conquest, chiefly in the 14th to 17th centuries, which ushered in the period known as "Tourkokratia" ("rule of the Turks"; see Ottoman Greece). During the ensuing half-century, the unstable Latin Empire siphoned off much of Europe's crusading energy. The legacy of the Fourth Crusade was the deep sense of betrayal felt by the Greek Christians. With the events of 1204, the schism between the Churches in the East and West was not just complete but also solidified.

During the Frankokratia, the Latin Empire was faced with a number of enemies. After taking Constantinople the crusaders were not able to take possession of the entire empire. The Franks were faced by several Eastern Roman rump states, whose rulers considered themselves the legitimate successors to the Imperial throne. The three most important of these surviving Byzantine entities were the Despotate of Epirus in Epirus, the Empire of Nicaea in Anatolia and the Empire of Trebizond in Paphlagonia, Pontus, Bithynia, and Crimea. Besides the individual Eastern Roman rump states in Epirus, Nicaea and Trebizond, the crusaders were threatened by the Christian Second Bulgarian Empire in Bulgaria, Wallachia, and the Balkans and the Muslim & nomadic Seljuk Sultanate of Rûm in Anatolia, and later the Mongol Empire, or more specifically, the Golden Horde. Ultimately the crusaders lacked the numbers sufficient to permanently hold their new conquests.

The fragmented Eastern Roman rump states fought against the crusaders, Bulgarians, Turks, and each other. During the Frankokratia various Latin–French lordships throughout Greece – in particular, the Duchy of Athens and the principality of the Morea – provided cultural contacts with western Europe and promoted the study of Greek. There was also a French cultural influence, notably the production of a collection of laws, the Assises de Romanie. The Chronicle of Morea appeared in both French and Greek (and later Italian and Aragonese) versions. Impressive remains of Crusader castles and Gothic churches can still be seen in Greece. Nevertheless, the Latin Empire always rested on shaky foundations.

Constantinople was re-captured by the Nicaeans under Michael VIII Palaiologos in 1261, with naval support from the Genoese in the Reconquest of Constantinople. This led to the restoration of a diminished Byzantine Empire. Commerce with Venice was re-established but the Nicaeans gave their Genoese allies possession of Galata, a fortress on the northern banks of the Golden Horn.

The Fourth Crusade had other and greater historical impacts. During the Frankokratia those Eastern Roman lands which were not under a stable government were permanently lost to the Seljuks in Anatolia. Southern Greece and the Greek islands remained mostly under rule of the crusaders, Italian nobles, and Venice. Even the Byzantine Greek Despotate of Epirus would also be ruled by another Italian noble family. Most of these crusader kingdoms would be annexed into the future Ottoman Empire, not the resurgent Byzantine-Nicaean state. The treasury of the Byzantine Empire was depleted, most of it stolen by the crusaders. All of these factors would hasten the final fall of the Byzantine Empire to the Ottoman Turks in 1453 to the Ottoman Sultan, Mehmed II. This final fall of the Eastern Roman Empire would usher in a new era to the ancient land of Greece which the Greeks would know as Tourkokratia, or "the Rule of the Turks".

== Reactions to the Crusade ==
=== Contemporary opposition to the sack of Constantinople ===
"O City, City, eye of all cities, universal boast, supramundane wonder, nurse of churches, leader of the faith, guide of Orthodoxy, beloved topic of orations, the abode of every good thing! Oh City, that hast drunk at the hand of the Lord the cup of his fury! O City, consumed by fire..."

— Niketas Choniates laments the fall of Constantinople to the Crusaders.

Several prominent Crusaders, including Enguerrand II of Boves, Simon de Montfort, 5th Earl of Leicester and Guy of Vaux-de-Cernay, among others, disagreed with the attacks on Zara and Constantinople and refused to take part in them. Indeed, most of the Crusaders did not take part in the attacks in Constantinople or did so unwillingly.

Byzantinist Jonathan Harris wrote that when the decision was made to divert to Constantinople "A sizable proportion [of Crusaders] left the army and made their own way to the Holy Land. Those who remained only agreed very reluctantly to the diversion when subjected to a mixture of financial and emotional blackmail. Even then, many hesitated before the final attack in April 1204, and had serious doubts as to whether it was legitimate to attack a Christian city in this way".

The French noble Simon de Montfort, in particular, did not participate and was an outspoken critic. He and his associates, including Guy of Vaux-de-Cernay, left the crusade when the decision was taken to divert to Constantinople to place Alexius IV Angelus on the throne. Instead, Simon and his followers travelled to the court of King Emeric of Hungary and thence to Acre. Several other substantial contingents, including the large Flemish fleet with Marie of Champagne on board, sailed directly to Acre as well.

Monk and poet Guiot de Provins wrote a satirical play in response to the Crusade accusing the papacy of avarice. Somewhat later, Guilhem Figueira wrote a sirventes and repeated these accusations, asserting that greed was the primary factor behind the crusade. He harshly stated,

Deceitful Rome, avarice ensnares you, so that you shear the wool of your sheep too much. May the Holy Ghost, who takes on human flesh, hear my prayer and break your beak, O Rome! You will never have a truce with me because you are false and perfidious with us and the Greeks ... Rome, you do little harm to the Saracens, but you massacre Greeks and Latins. In hell-fire and ruin you have your seat, Rome.

Innocent III also opposed the sack; he neither sanctioned it nor knew about it. Innocent III had forbidden the Crusaders to attack the Byzantine Empire, instructing the leader, Boniface of Montferrat, that "The crusade must not attack Christians, but should proceed as quickly as possible to the Holy Land". When he found out about the events he wrote two angry letters addressed to Boniface. One of them reads:

How will the Greek Church... return to ecclesiastical unity and devotion to the Apostolic See, a church which has seen in the Latins nothing except an example of affliction and the works of Hell, so that now it rightly detests them more than dogs?... It was not enough for them [the Latins] to empty the imperial treasuries and to plunder the spoils of princes and lesser folk, but rather they extended their hands to church treasuries and, what was more serious, to their possessions, even ripping away silver tablets from altars and breaking them into pieces among themselves, violating sacristies and crosses, and carrying away relics.

Historian Robert Lee Wolff interprets the two letters from Innocent III as a sign of the Pope's "early spirit of understanding for the Greeks".

Only one contemporary Arab-Muslim historian, Ibn al-Athir, provided a detailed report of the sack of Constantinople by the Crusaders. It struck him as "an atrocity in its scale of rapine, slaughter and wanton destruction of centuries of classical and Christian civilisation".

=== Modern assessment ===
The prominent medievalist Sir Steven Runciman wrote in 1954: "There was never a greater crime against humanity than the Fourth Crusade." According to historian Martin Arbagi, "The diversion of the Fourth Crusade in 1204 was one of the great atrocities of medieval history, and Pope Innocent III placed most of the blame on Venice". The controversy that has surrounded the Fourth Crusade has led to diverging opinions in academia on whether its objective was indeed the capture of Constantinople. The traditional position, which holds that this was the case, was challenged by Donald E. Queller and Thomas F. Madden in their book The Fourth Crusade (1997).

Constantinople was considered as a bastion of Christianity that defended Europe from Muslim invasion, and the Fourth Crusade's sack of the city dealt an irreparable blow to this eastern bulwark. Although the Greeks retook Constantinople after 57 years of Latin rule, the Crusade crippled the Byzantine Empire. Reduced to Constantinople, north-western Anatolia, and a portion of the southern Balkans, the empire fell when the Ottoman Muslims captured the city in 1453.

Eight hundred years later, Pope John Paul II twice expressed sorrow for the events of the Fourth Crusade. In 2001, he wrote to Christodoulos, Archbishop of Athens, "It is tragic that the assailants, who set out to secure free access for Christians to the Holy Land, turned against their brothers in the faith. The fact that they were Latin Christians fills Catholics with deep regret." In 2004, while Bartholomew I, Patriarch of Constantinople, was visiting the Vatican, John Paul II asked, "How can we not share, at a distance of eight centuries, the pain and disgust." This has been regarded as an apology to the Greek Orthodox Church for the massacres perpetrated by the warriors of the Fourth Crusade.

In April 2004, in a speech on the 800th anniversary of the city's capture, Ecumenical Patriarch Bartholomew I formally accepted the apology. "The spirit of reconciliation is stronger than hatred," he said during a liturgy attended by Roman Catholic Archbishop Philippe Barbarin of Lyon, France. "We receive with gratitude and respect your cordial gesture for the tragic events of the Fourth Crusade. It is a fact that a crime was committed here in the city 800 years ago." Bartholomew said his acceptance came in the spirit of Easter. "The spirit of reconciliation of the resurrection... incites us toward reconciliation of our churches."

The Fourth Crusade was one of the last of the major crusades to be launched by the Papacy, though it quickly fell out of Papal control. After bickering between laymen and the papal legate led to the collapse of the Fifth Crusade, later crusades were directed by individual monarchs, mostly against Egypt. In one instance, the Sixth Crusade succeeded in restoring Jerusalem to Christian rule for 15 years.

== Gallery ==
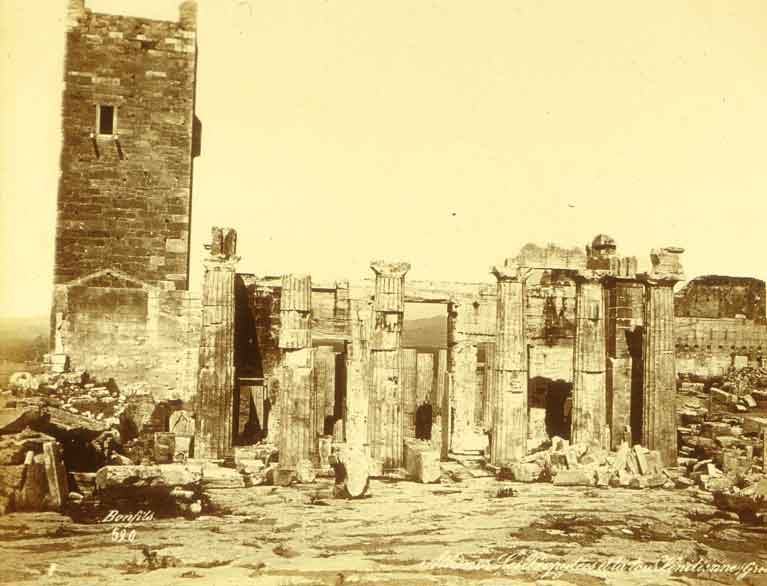
The Frankish tower on the Acropolis of Athens, demolished in 1874

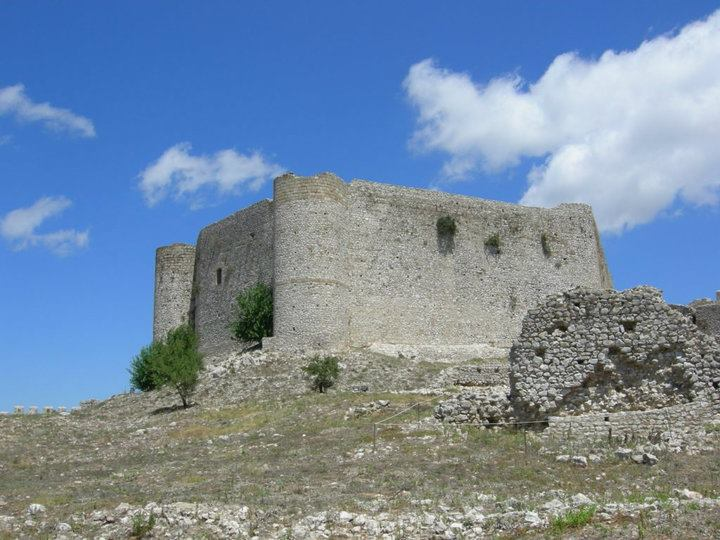
Chlemoutsi castle

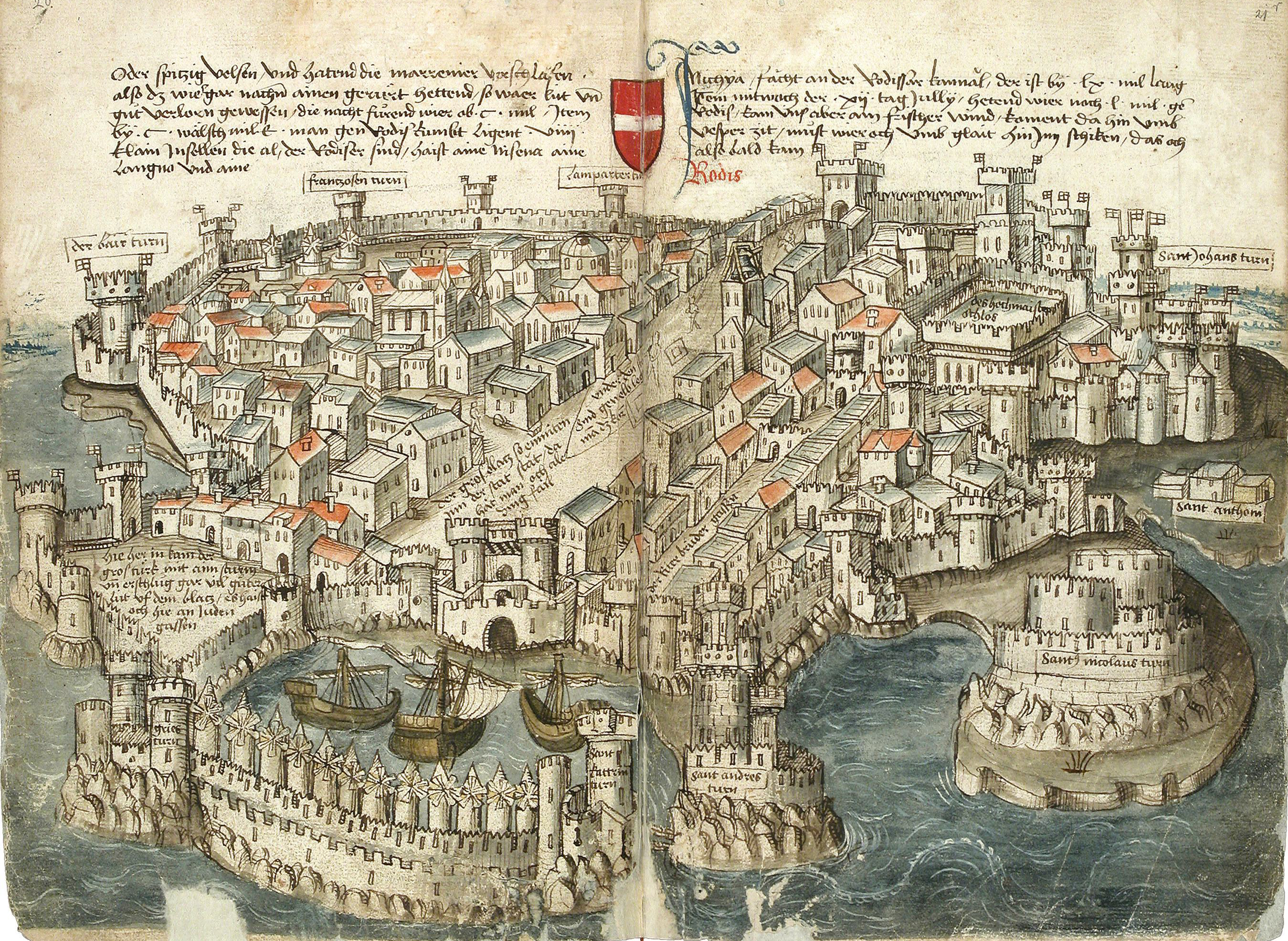
Rhodes (city), around 1490

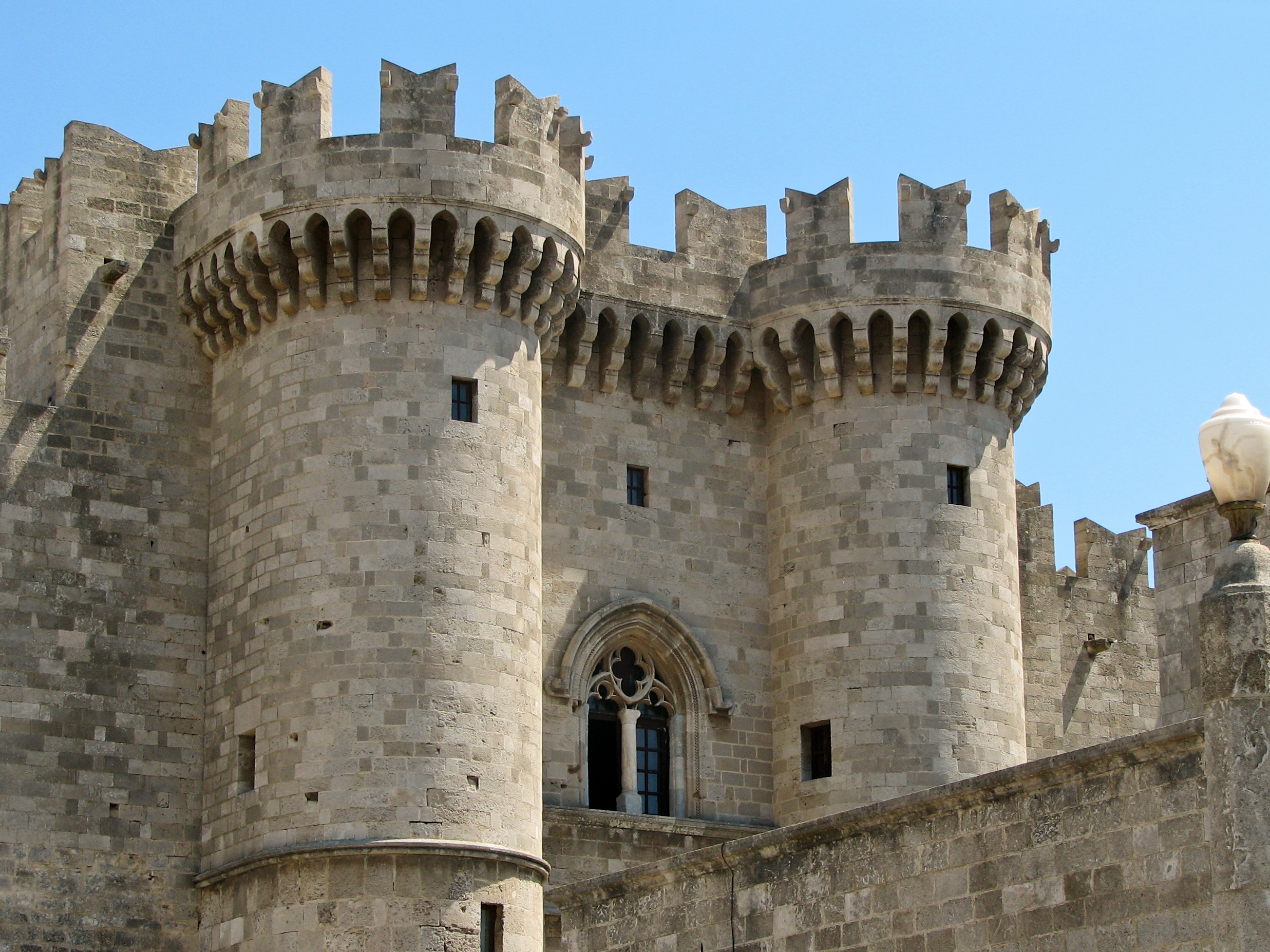
Palace of the Grand Master of the Knights of Rhodes

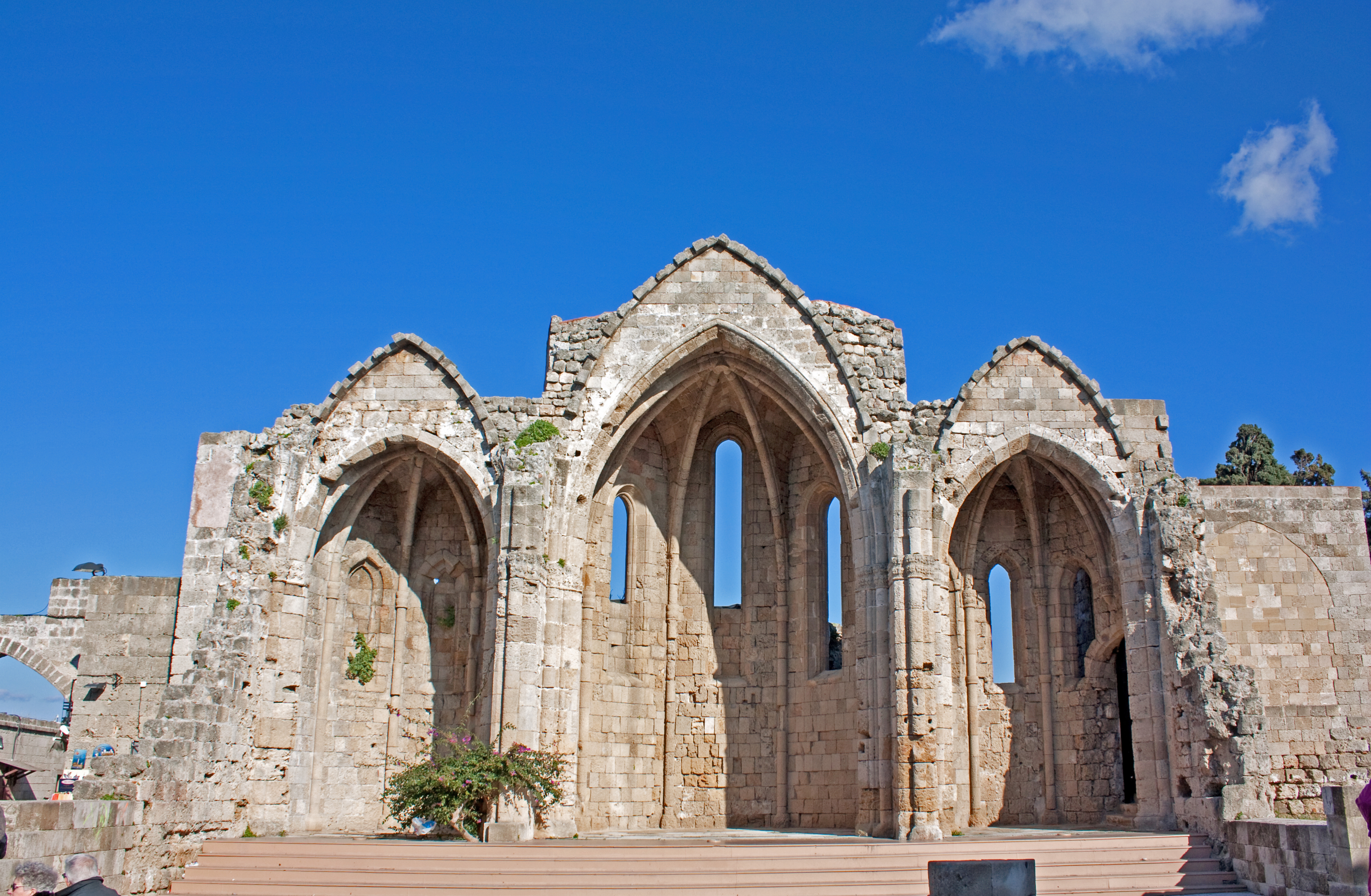
Church of Virgin, Rhodes (city)

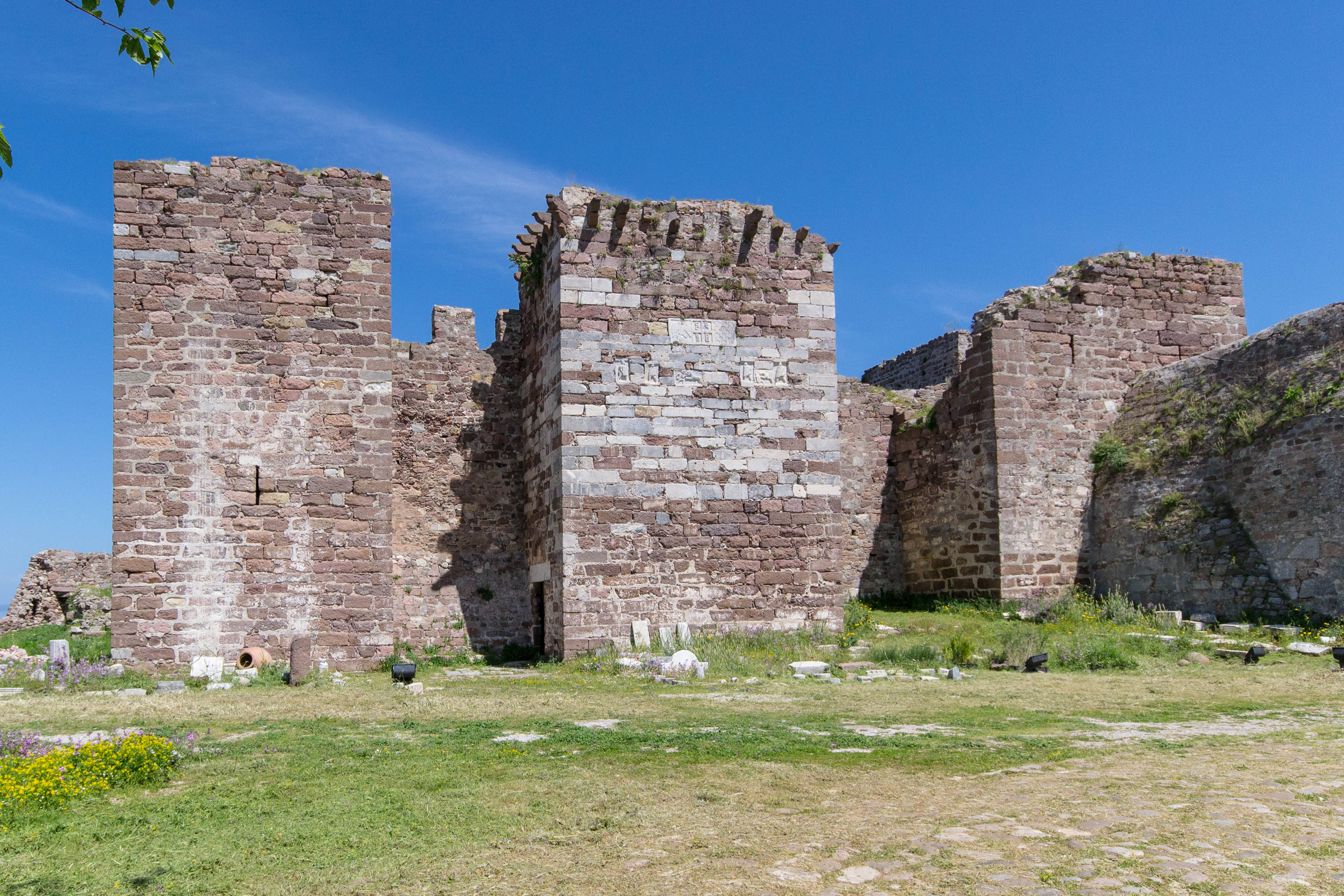
Genoese Castle of Mytilene

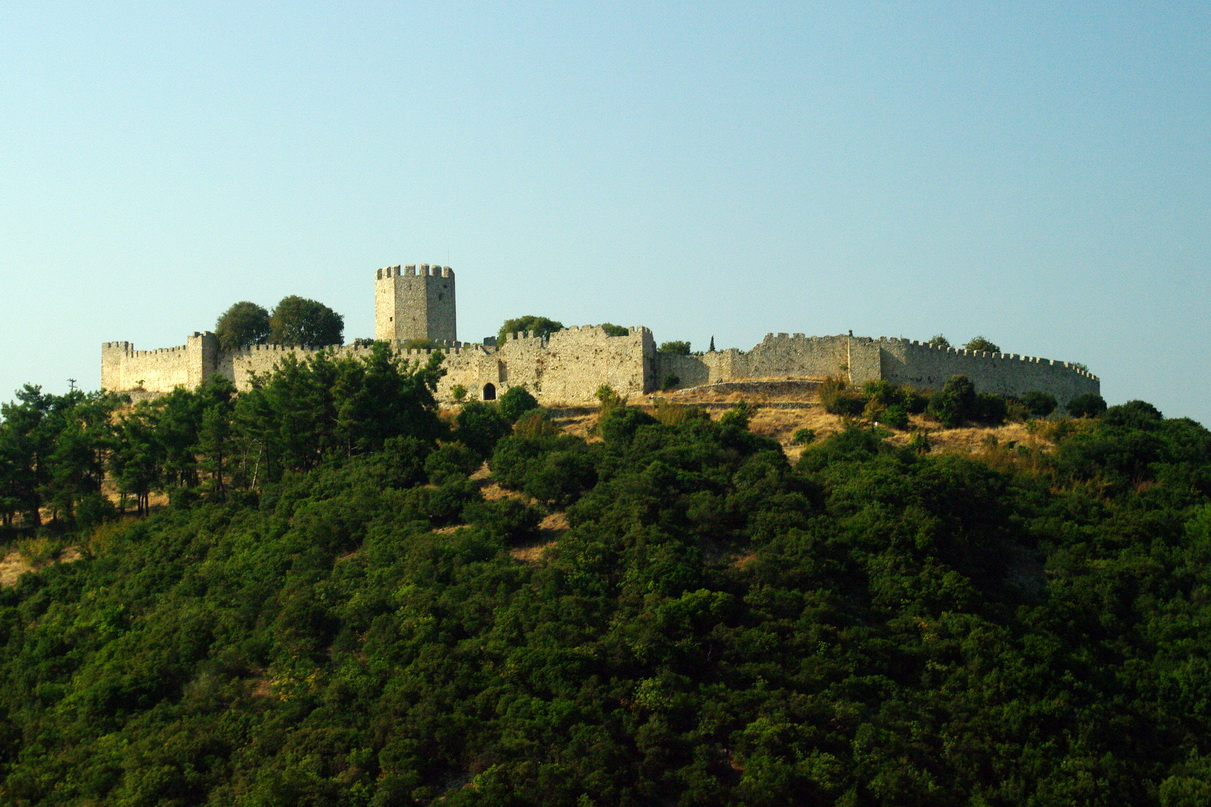
Platamon Castle
Venetian possessions (till 1797)

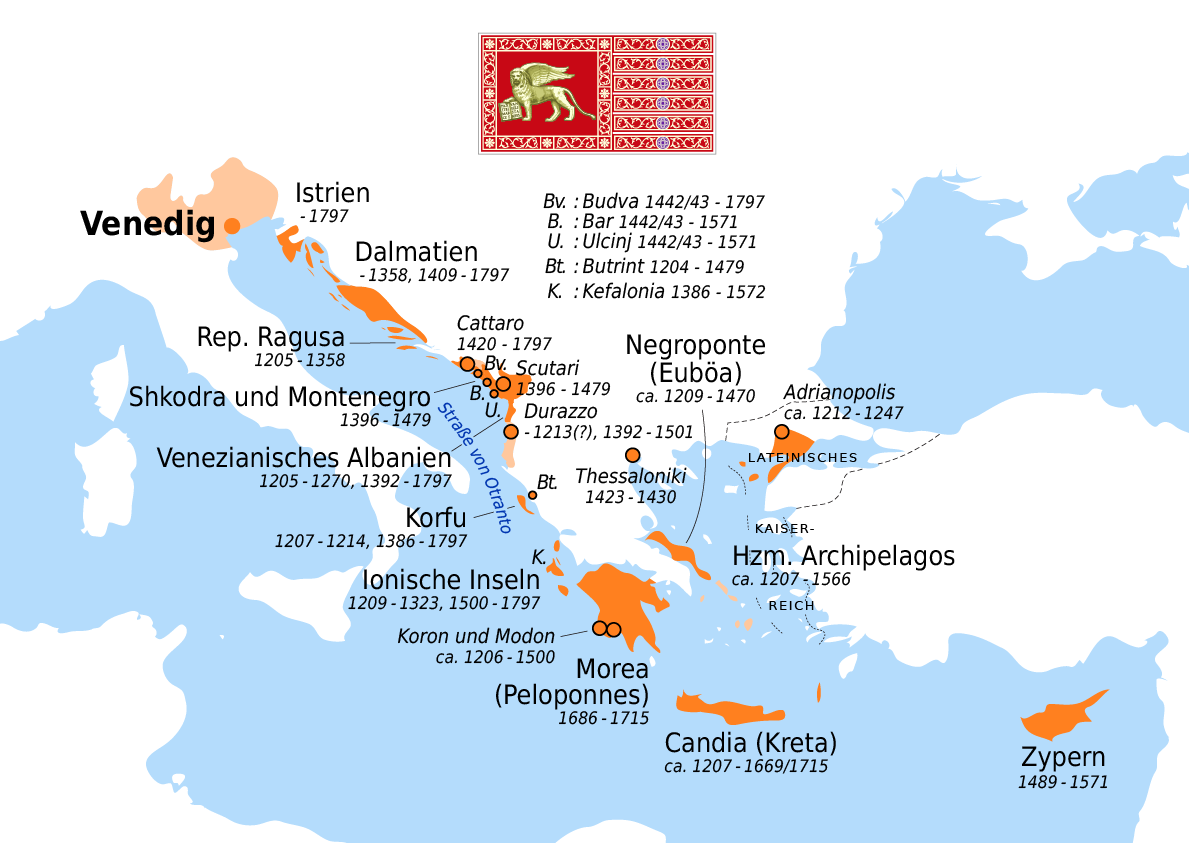
Stato da Màr of the Republic of Venice

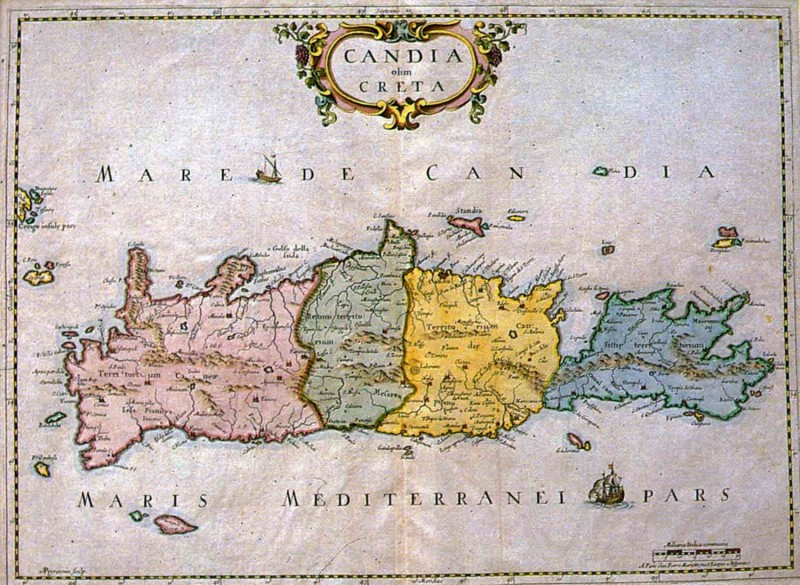
Map of the Kingdom of Candia

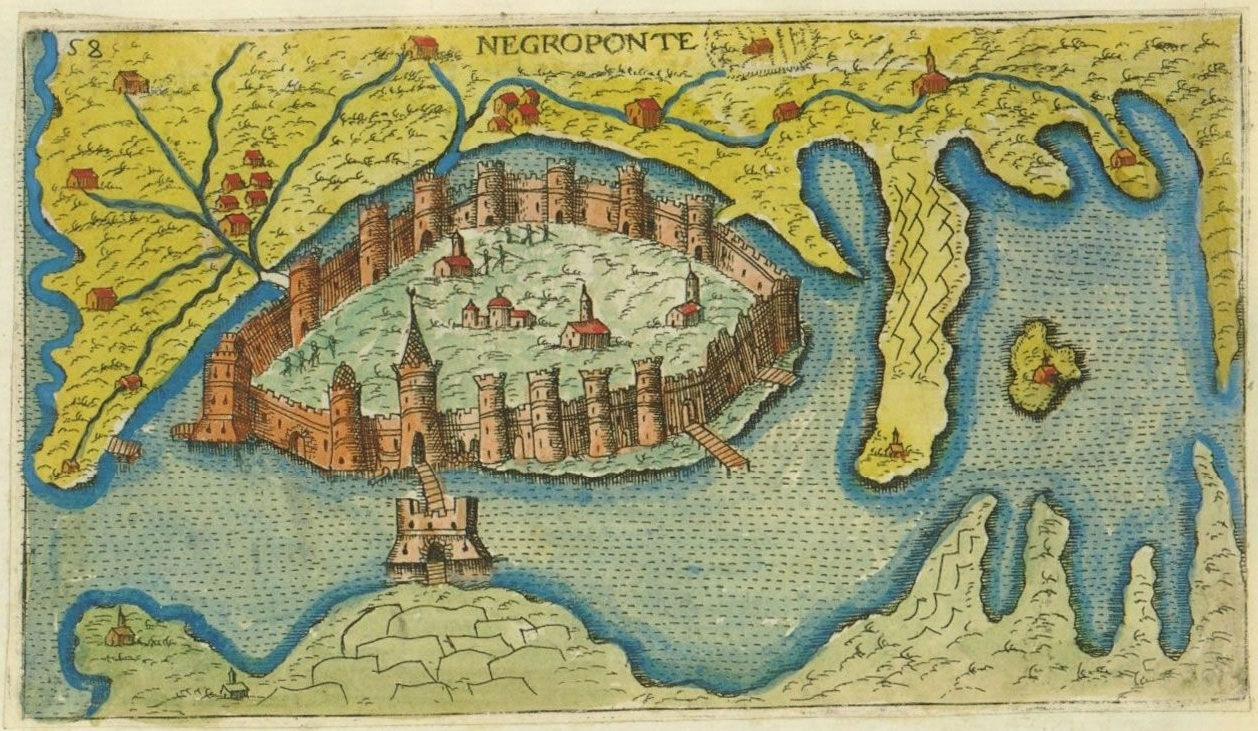
Venetian map of Negroponte (Chalkis)

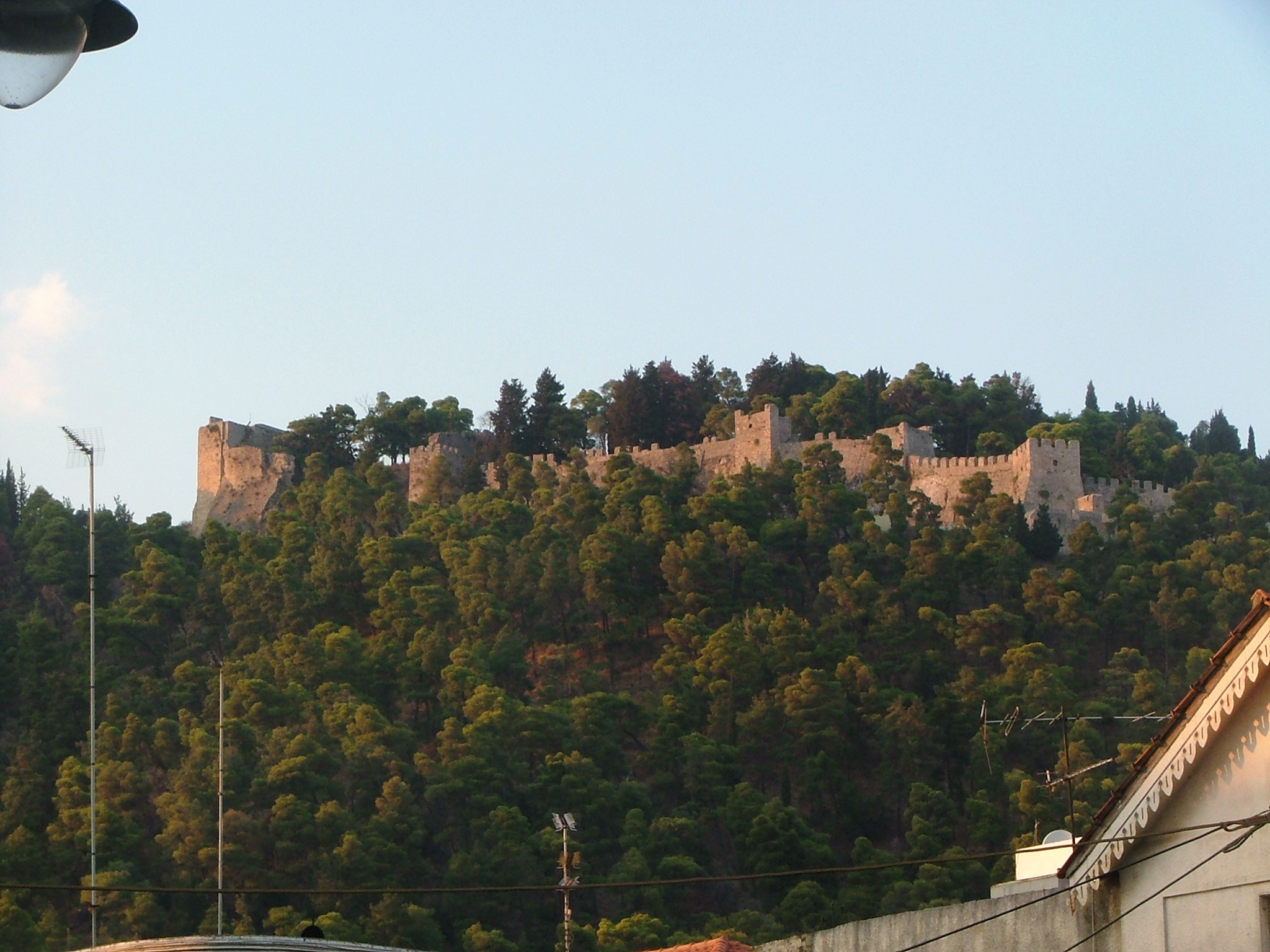
Fortress of Nafpaktos

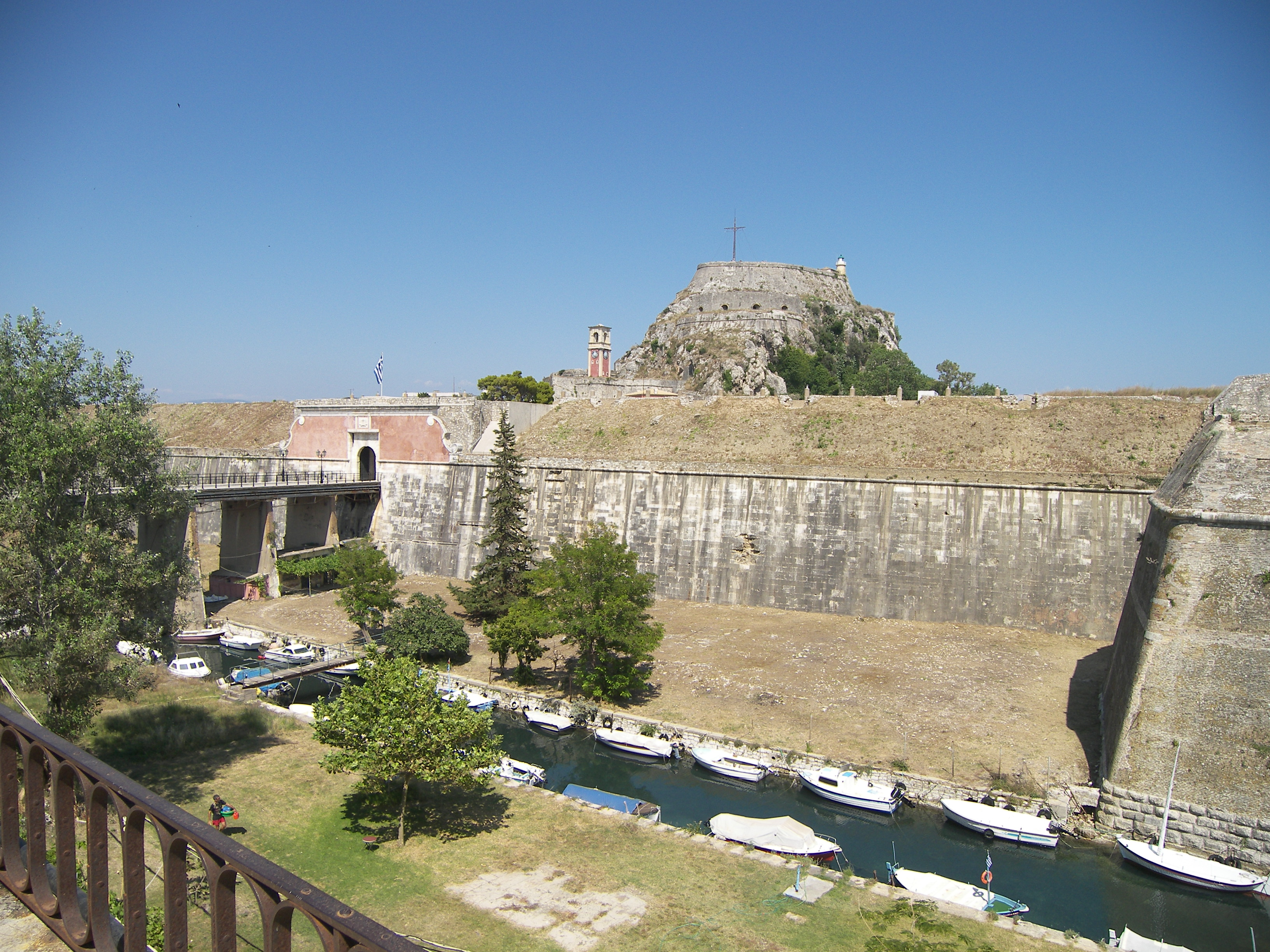
Old Fortress, Corfu

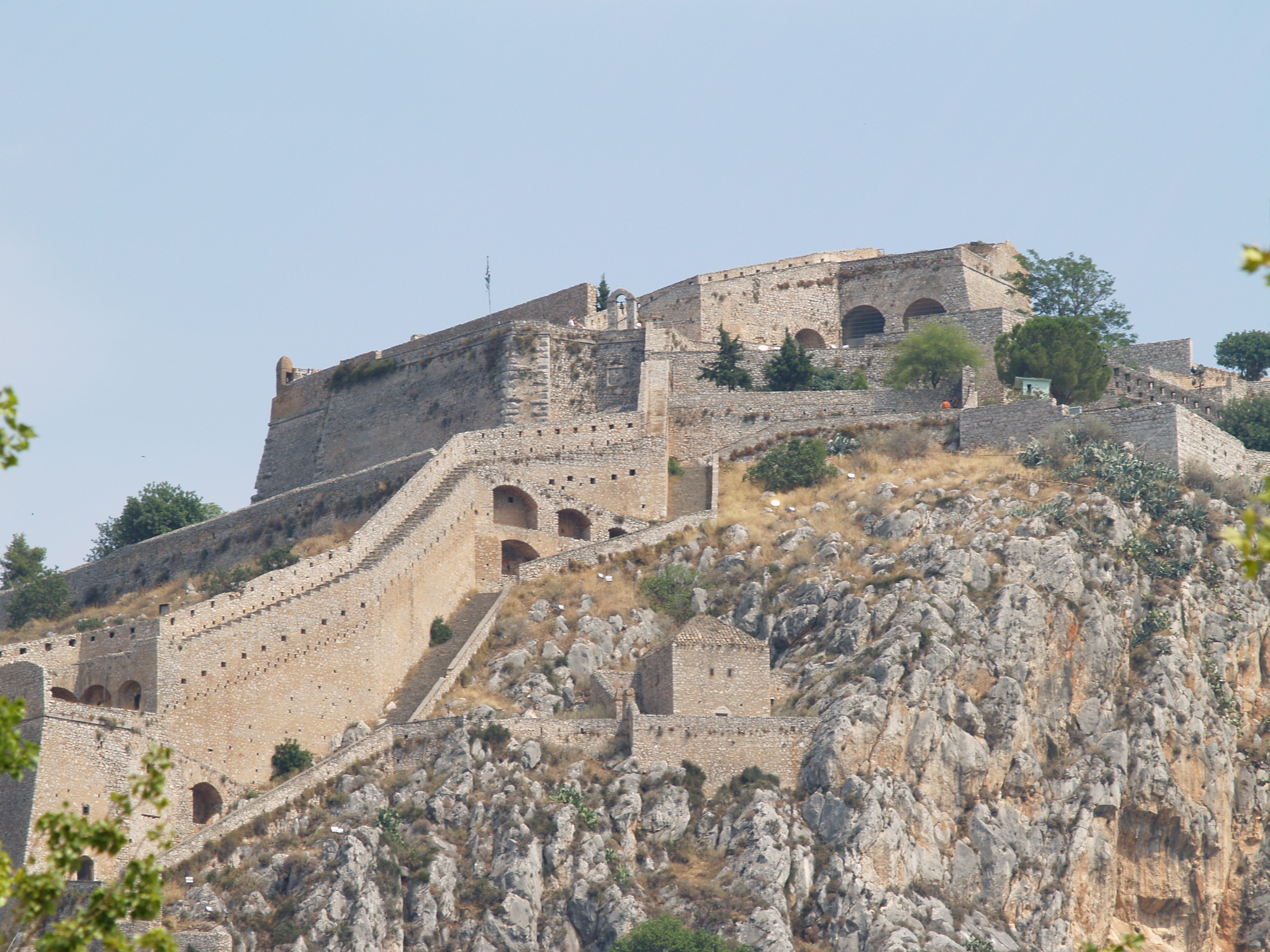
Palamidi, Nafplion

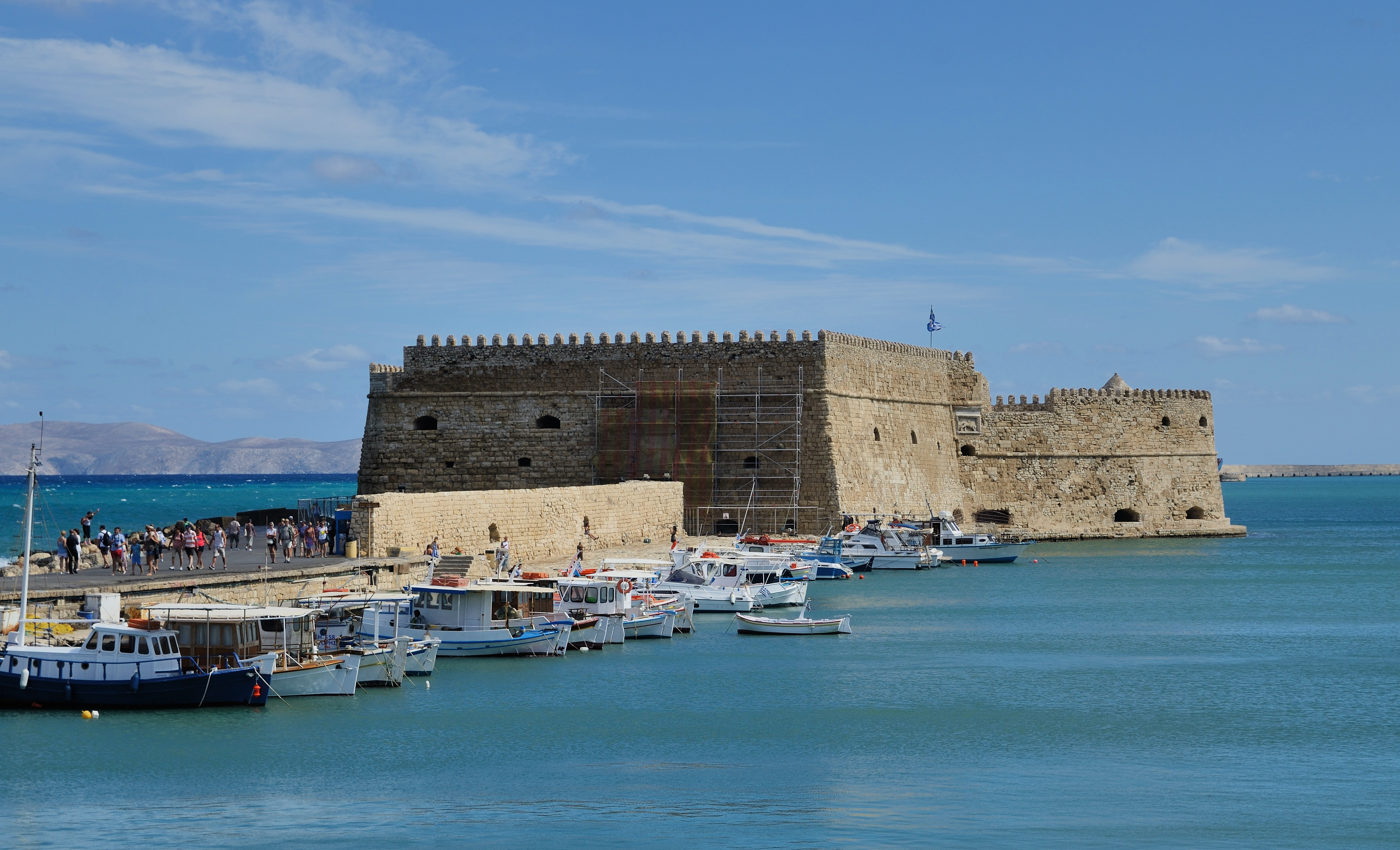
Rocca a Mare fortress in Heraklion

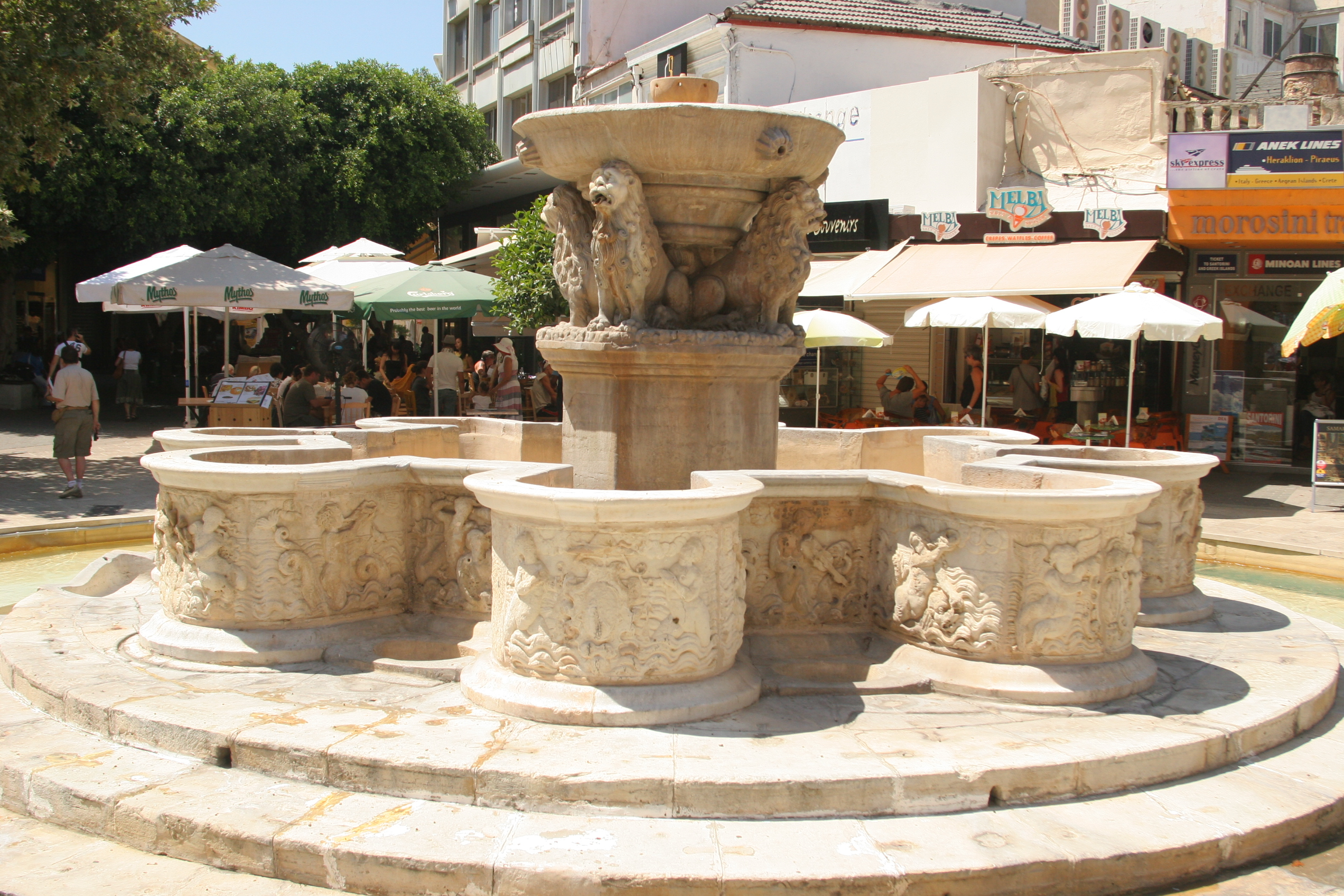
The Morosini fountain, Lions Square, Heraklion

== See also ==
- Bulgarian-Latin Wars
- Laskaris
- Latin Church in the Middle East
- Medieval Bulgarian Army
- Principality of Arbanon
- Second Bulgarian Empire
- Succession of the Roman Empire
- Third Crusade
- Timeline of Orthodoxy in Greece (1204–1453)
