= Walter II (bishop of Autun) =

Bishop of Autun

Walter II (French: Gautier or Gauthier) was the bishop of Autun from 1189 until 1223.

Walter's family background is unknown. He was a member of the regular clergy prior to his election as bishop in 1189. In 1202, he joined the Fourth Crusade in a ceremony alongside some knights from the Auvergne. He did not travel with the main army, but sailed with his company directly to the Holy Land from Marseille, thus avoiding the sack of Constantinople. Count Guigues III of Forez travelled in the same flotilla. Both arrived in Acre in early 1203.

Walter returned to the Holy Land with the Fifth Crusade in 1217.

Walter was dead by 1224. He was buried in the Abbey of Saint-Symphorien, Autun.

== Bibliography ==
- Bouchard, Constance Brittain (1987). Sword, Miter, and Cloister: Nobility and the Church in Burgundy, 980–1198. Cornell University Press.
- Longnon, Jean (1978). Les compagnons de Villehardouin: Recherches sur les croisés de la quatrième croisade. Librairie Droz.
- Mas Latrie, Louis de (1889). Trésor de chronologie, d'histoire et de géographie pour l'étude et l'emploi des documents du moyen-âge. Paris: Victor Palmé.
- Queller, D. E.; Compton, T. K.; Campbell, D. A. (1974). "The Fourth Crusade: The Neglected Majority". Speculum. 49 (3): 441–465. doi:10.2307/2851751.
- Régnier, Jean (1988). Les évêques d'Autun. Letouzey et Ané.
- Runciman, Steven (1951). A History of the Crusades, Volume III: The Kingdom of Acre and the Later Crusades. Cambridge University Press.
