= Guigues III of Forez =

Armoiries Forez

Guigues III (died 1203), also numbered Guigues IV, nicknamed Branda, was the count of Forez from 1199 until his death while on the Fourth Crusade.

Guigues succeeded his father, Guigues II, in 1199 when the latter retired to the abbey of La Bénisson-Dieu. In 1202, he was at Lyon preparing to leave on crusade when he issued a charter in favour of his father's monastery. According to Geoffrey of Villehardouin, he and Bishop Walter of Autun did not travel with the main army, but took ship at Marseille direct for the Holy Land. They were accompanied by an army of 300 knights and sergeants. According to the Chronicle of Ernoul, he died shortly after his arrival in Acre in 1203. He was buried in the Hospitaller church of Saint John in Acre. In 1215, his brother, Archbishop Renaud of Lyon, donated money for an annual celebration on the anniversary of Guigues's death at the hospital of Montbrison, a family foundation.

Guigues's first wife was Asiurra, with whom he had a daughter, name unknown, who married William the Old, lord of Baffie. He divorced his first wife and married Alix, with whom he had three children: Guigues IV, who succeeded him; Guigonne, who married Count Gerard II of Mâcon; and Marquise, who married Guy VI, viscount of Thiers.

== Bibliography ==
- Longnon, Jean (1978). Les compagnons de Villehardouin: Recherches sur les croisés de la quatrième croisade. Librairie Droz.
- Mas Latrie, Louis de (1889). Trésor de chronologie, d'histoire et de géographie pour l'étude et l'emploi des documents du moyen-âge. Paris: Victor Palmé.
- Pringle, Denys (2009). The Churches of the Crusader Kingdom of Jerusalem: A Corpus. Vol. 4. Cambridge University Press.
- Queller, D. E.; Compton, T. K.; Campbell, D. A. (1974). "The Fourth Crusade: The Neglected Majority". Speculum. 49 (3): 441–465. doi:10.2307/2851751.
- Riley-Smith, Jonathan (2007). "The Hospitaller Commandery of Eterpigny and a Postscript to the Fourth Crusade in Syria". In Iris Shagrir; Ronnie Ellenblum; Jonathan Riley-Smith (eds.). In Laudem Hierosolymitani: Studies in Crusades and Medieval Culture in Honour of Benjamin Z. Kedar. Ashgate. pp. 385–394.
