= Lions Square =

Square in Heraklion, Crete, Greece

Coordinates: 35.3391°N 25.1331°E

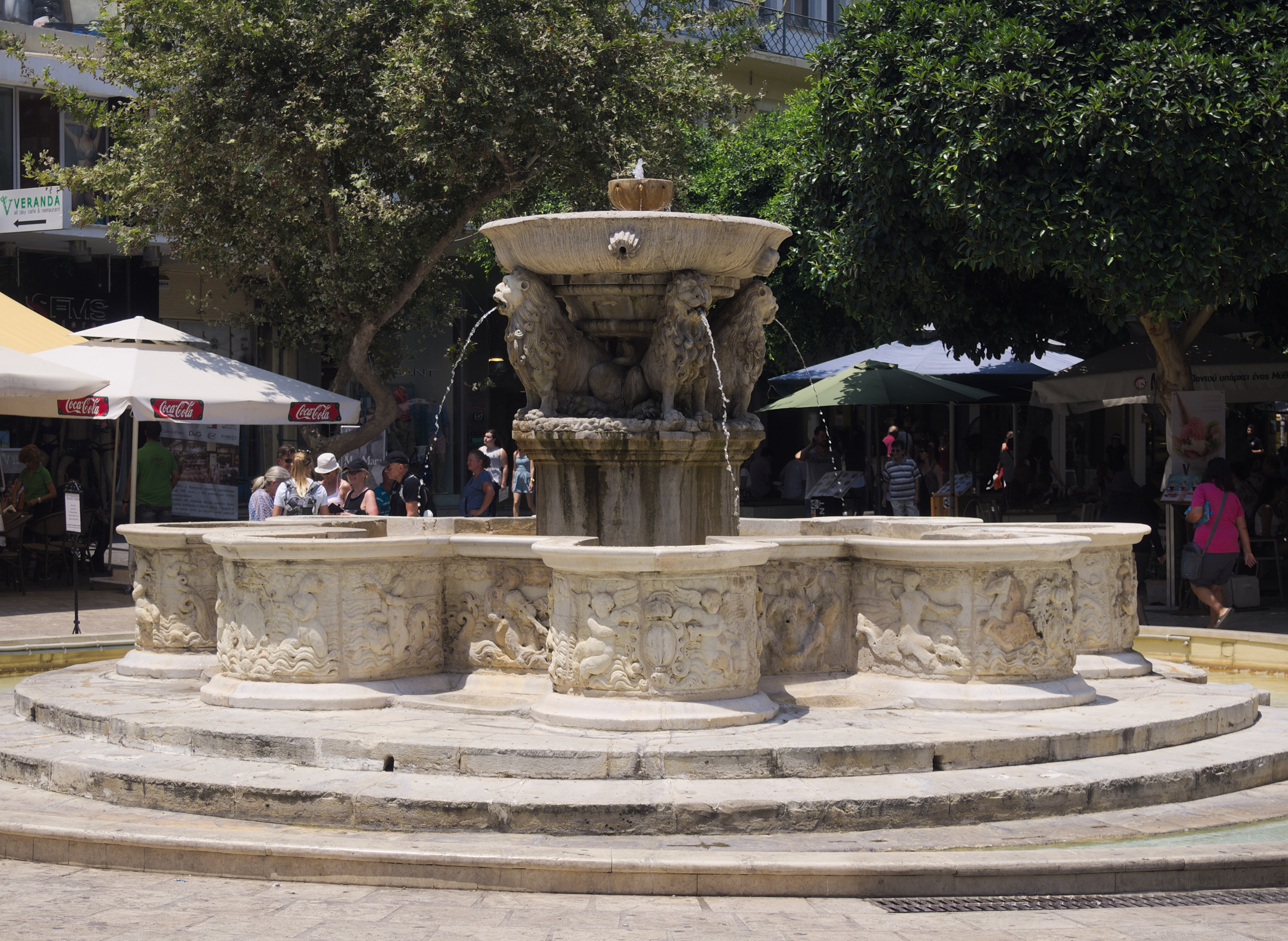
The Morosini Fountain in the square.

Eleftheriou Venizelou Square (Greek: Πλατεία Ελευθερίου Βενιζέλου) is a square in the city of Heraklion in Crete, named after the Cretan statesman Eleftherios Venizelos. It dates back to the Venetian era and is more commonly known as Lions Square (Greek: Πλατεία Λεόντων) or Leonton Square (genitive), after the Venetian-era Morosini Fountain (popularly called "τα Λιοντάρια", "The Lions") in its midst, which features four lions supporting the main basin.

== Gallery ==
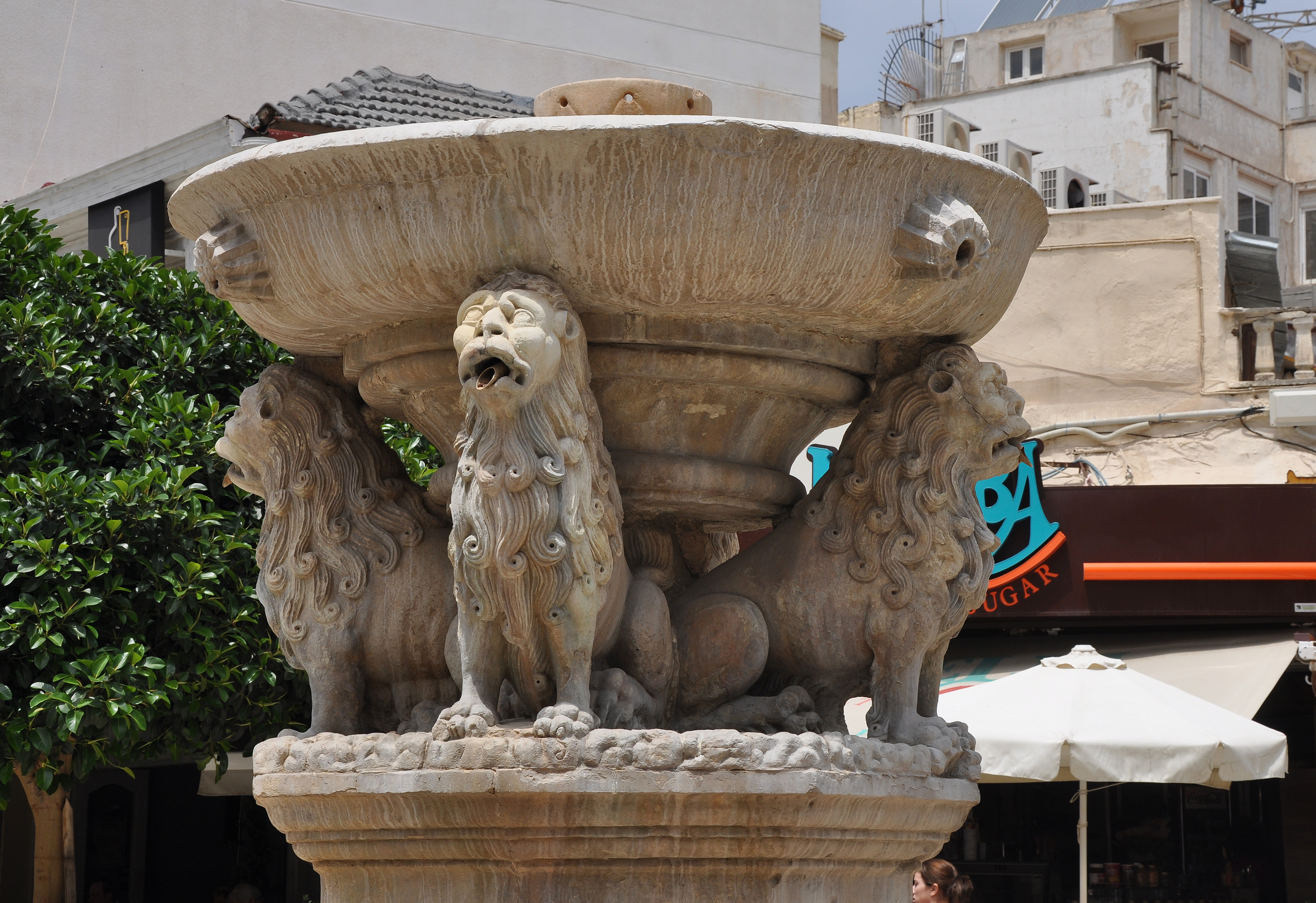
The Lions

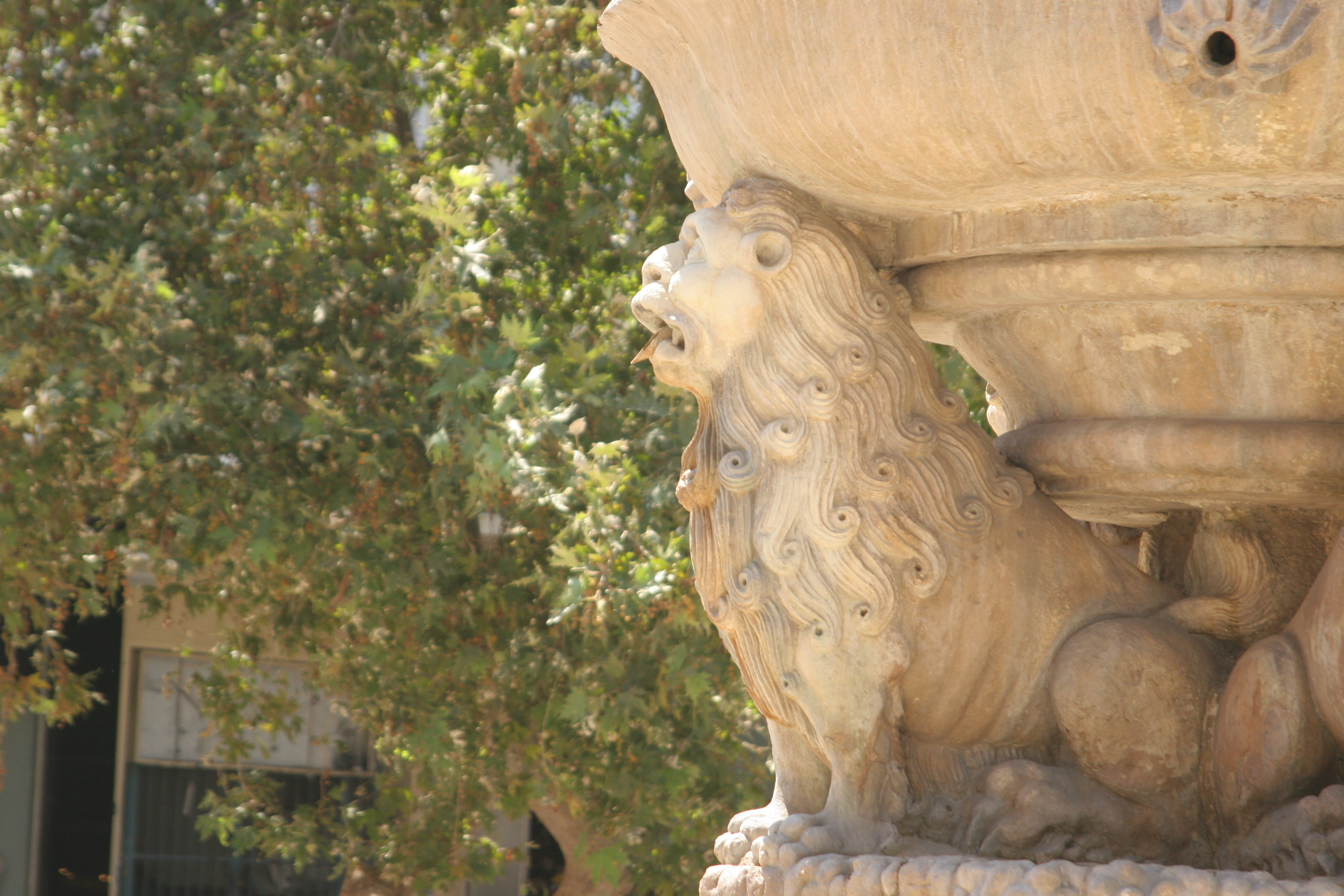
Detail

== Sources ==
- Lions Square, at explorecrete.com
