= War of the Castle of Love =

Conflict (1215–1216)

The War of the Castle of Love was a conflict in 1215–1216 between Padua and Treviso on one side and Venice on the other. It began with an exchange of insults at a festival, escalated to raiding and finally to open warfare. The decisive engagement was fought near the mouth of the Adige on 22 October 1215 and a peace treaty was signed on 9 April 1216.

Narrative sources for the war include the Liber chronicorum of Rolandino of Padua, Les estoires de Venise of Martino Canal, the Chronicon of Andrea Dandolo, De origine urbis Venetiarum of Marino Sanuto and Historie venete of Gian Giacomo Caroldo.

== Pageant ==
The March of Treviso was sometimes known poetically as the marca amorosa (amorous march) or marca gioiosa (joyous march) on account of its supposed predilection for pageantry. In 1214, Treviso declared a "court of solace and mirth" to be held over eight days starting on Easter. On this most of the sources agree. Several, however, place it in a different year. Sanuto places it on Whit Monday 1213. Rolandino dates it to Albizzo da Fiore's term as podestà, which probably lasted from 29 June 1214 until 29 June 1215. The Cronaca Foscariniana, a late 15th-century source that had access to earlier records, places the festival on 8 June 1215. According to the late source, it was held in celebration of a peace agreement between rival families signed at Spineda on 1 March 1215.

Invitations were sent throughout the March and also to Venice and Lombardy. The number of attendees from out of town was reckoned at 1,200 gentlemen with their wives, with 360 of these men coming from Venice and the rest from Padua, Vicenza, Verona, Friuli, Feltre and Belluno. The total in attendance was over 5,000 plus 640 guests hosted by Treviso. The peace treaty signed after the war refers to the festival as the ludi Tarvisii, games of Treviso.

Festivities including dancing and jousting in the streets and piazzas. The centrepiece, however, was the wooden "castle of love" constructed outside the Porta San Tomaso in a place called La Spineta, corresponding to the neighbourhood of Selvana today. This was defended by ladies and damsels against the assaults of the young men of Treviso, Padua and Venice, who threw flowers, pastries and spices, respectively, at the battlements. Rolandino describes the weapons of this pageant as follows:

and the arms and engines wherewith men fought against it were apples and dates and muscat-nuts [nutmeg], tarts and pears and quinces, roses and lilies and violets, and vases of balsam or ambergris or rosewater, amber, camphor, cardamums, cinnamon, cloves, pomegranates, and all manner of flowers or spices that are fragrant to smell and fair to see.

A panel of knights was supposed to referee the event and decide to which city the castle would surrender. Eventually the Venetians switched to throwing ducats, which the women abandoned the battlements to pick up. When the Venetians moved to enter the castle, a fight ensued with the Paduans. The rectors of Treviso and the commander of the Paduan militia, Paolo da Sermodele, intervened to break it up, and so narrowly averted bloodshed.

== War ==
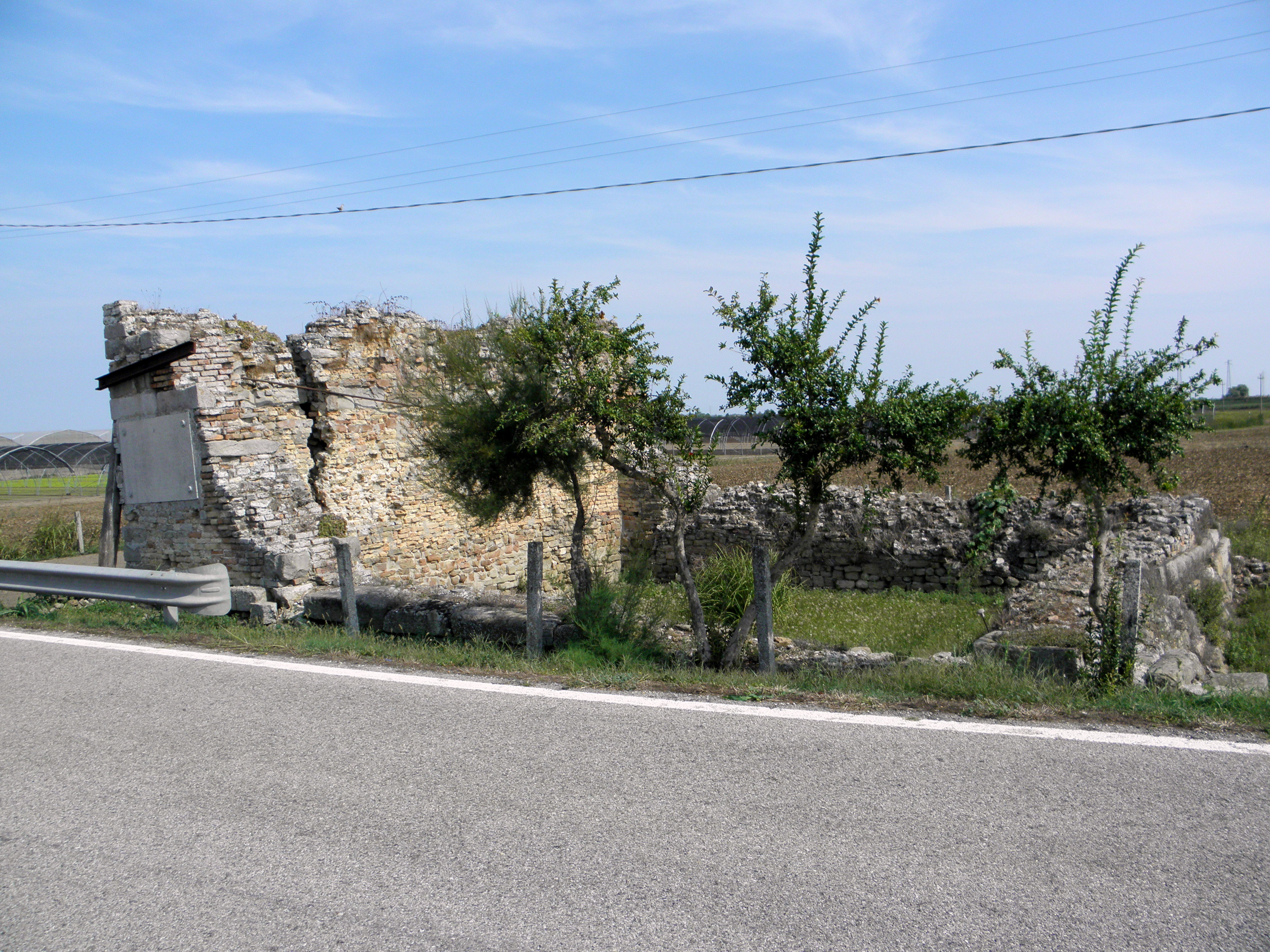
Ruins of the Torre delle Bebbe today, site of the main battle of the War of the Castle of Love

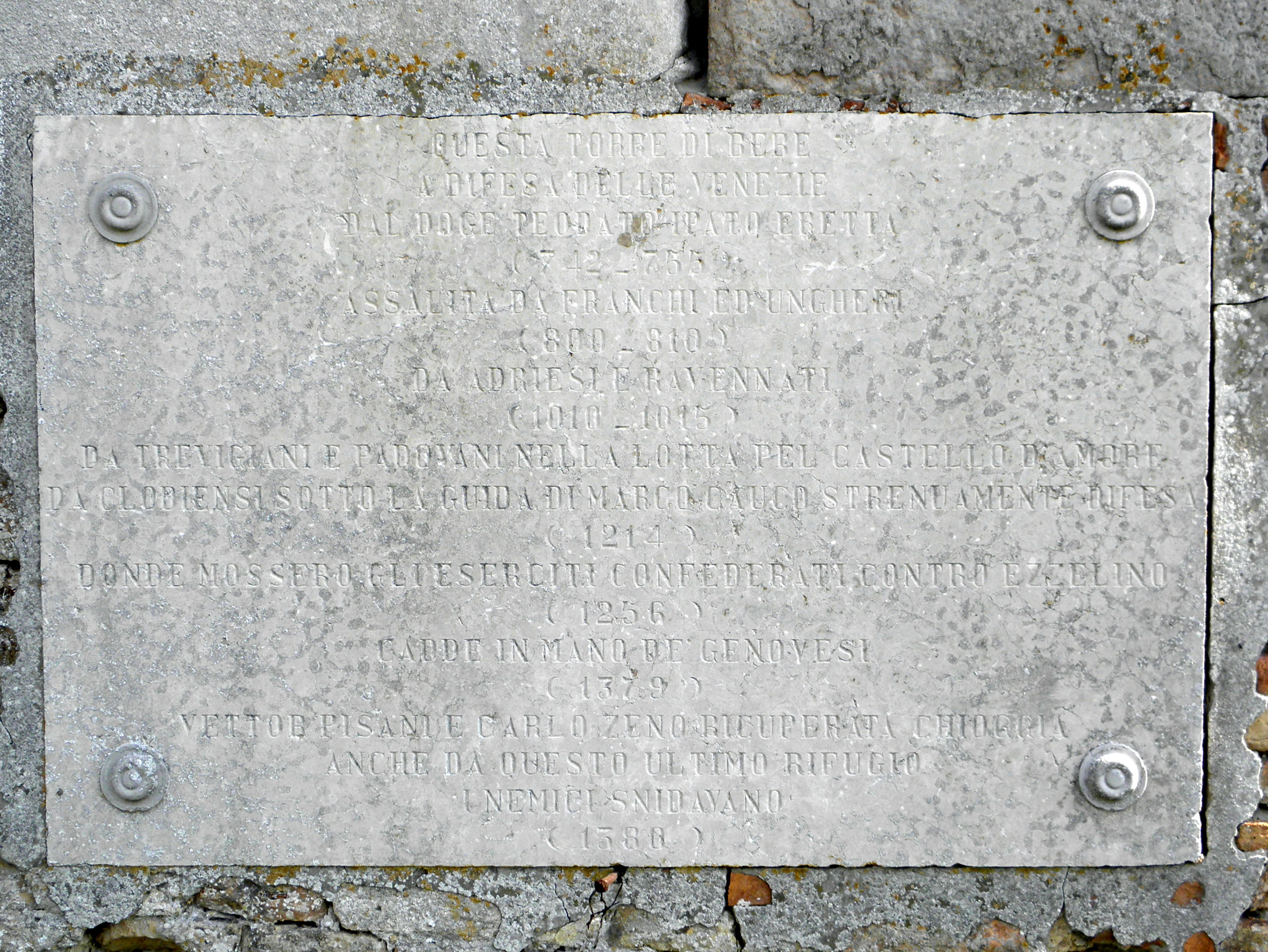
Commemorative plaque on the Torre delle Bebbe, which records how in 1214 it was "strenuously defended by Chioggians under the guidance of Marco Cauco from Trevisans and Paduans in the fight for the castle of love" (da Trevigiani e Padovani nella lotta pel castello d'amore, da Clodiensi sotto la guida di Marco Cauco strenuamente difesa)

Warfare did not break out immediately as a result of the spoiled pageant, but relations between Padua and Venice turned sour. According to the Cronaca Altinate, Doge Pietro Ziani strove to maintain peace through diplomacy so that Venice could concentrate on its recent acquisitions in Greece. The year following the pageant was spent in diplomatic exchanges and raids until Venice severed commercial relations with Padua. In the words of Rolandino:

For in process of time the enmity between Paduans and Venetians waxed so sore that all commerce of trade forbidden on either side, and the confines were guarded lest anything should be brought from one land to the other: then men practised robberies and violence, so that discord grew afresh, and wars, and deadly enmity.

In the autumn of 1215, Padua invaded Venetian territory and attacked the Torre delle Bebbe near the mouth of the Adige. This tower had been built by Venice to control the traffic on the Adige. Its garrison consisted of men from Chioggia and some sailors. In preparation for the Paduan assault, they filled its base with earth, dug a ditch around it and created a covering for it with ropes taken from ships in order to protect it from the projectiles of siege engines. Taking advantage of high tide on 22 October, the defenders sortied, supported by a small fleet, sacked the Paduan camp and took at least 400 prisoners. One source puts it at 400 knights plus many foot soldiers besides, but Dandolo records it as 200 knights and 200 foot soldiers. The Paduan captain, Geremia da Peraga, was among the captives. For its service, Chioggia was released from its annual tribute to Venice of three hens per household.

Owing to unusually heavy rains, the ground was exceptionally marshy and the Paduans were forced to break up in retreat. Some of the retreating Paduans encountered a force under the podestà of Treviso that had been coming to reinforce them. Observing the rout, the Trevisans returned home. The author of the Cronaca Foscariniana and Bartolomeo Zuccato writing in the 16th century both report the Paduan–Trevisan alliance as having been signed on 4 September 1215. Other sources give 4 February 1215.

Following the intervention of Patriarch Wolfger of Aquileia, separate peace treaties for Padua and Treviso were signed on 9 April 1216 at San Giorgio in Alga in Venice. This achievement is mentioned on Wolfger's tombstone. Wolfger's influence stemmed in part from his position as the superior of the suffragan bishops of Treviso and Padua, but he may also have received a papal commission from Innocent III when he attended the Fourth Lateran Council in November 1215. The pope was at the time preparing a new crusade, which required general peace among the Christian powers of Europe. Present at the signing of the treaties was the prominent peacemaker Giordano Forzatè, who had probably acted as one of the Paduan government's advisers. According to the treaties, "on the occasion of the games of Treviso, the devil instigating, no small war between Venetians and Paduans arose" (instigante diabolo, occasione ludi Tarvisii, inter Venetos et Paduanos werra non modica fuisset suborta).

One of the articles of the treaty stipulated that the wealthy Jacopo da Sant'Andrea and twenty-five other Paduans would be at the disposal of the doge of Venice (perhaps to be tried). This suggests that Jacopo may have been behind Padua's decision to go to war.

== Bibliography ==
- Coulton, G. G. (ed.) A Medieval Garner: Human Documents from the Four Centuries preceding the Reformation. London: Archibald Constable, 1910.
- Folena, Gianfranco. "Tradizione e cultura trobadorica nelle corti e nelle citta venete", pp. 453–562. Storia della cultura veneta, Vol. 1: Dalle origini al trecento. Vicenza: Neri Pozzam 1976.
- Foligno, Cesare. The Story of Padua. London: J. M. Dent, 1910.
- Gaffuri, Laura. "Forzatè, Giordano". Dizionario Biografico degli Italiani, Volume 49: Forino–Francesco da Serino. Rome: Istituto dell'Enciclopedia Italiana, 1997.
- Jackson, F. Hamilon. The Shores of the Adriatic: The Italian Side – An Architectural and Archaeological Pilgrimage. London: John Murray, 1906.
- Molmenti, Pompeo G. Venice: Its Individual Growth from the Earliest Beginnings to the Fall of the Republic, Part 1: The Middle Ages, Volume 1. Translated by Horatio F. Brown. Chicago: A. C. McClurg, 1906.
- Pozza, Marco. "Un trattato fra Venezia e Padova ed i proprietari veneziani in terraferma". Studi veneziani, Ser. NS 7 (1983): 15–30.
- Predelli, Riccardo. "Documenti relativi alla guerra pel fatto del Castello di Amore". Archivio veneto 30 (1885): 421–447.
- Thaller, Anja. "«Desiderosi Trivisani de festizar in laude de la bona pase». Zur Neubewertung der “Liebesburgbelagerung” von Treviso". Reti Medievali Rivista 17.2 (2016): 385–418.
