= Francesco Contarini (1477–1558) =

Francesco Contarini (1477–1558) was a patrician, official and diplomat of the Republic of Venice. He rose to prominence following the capture of his father in battle in 1509. His early career was spent mainly in Venice and its Terraferma. He served as an ambassador in the Holy Roman Empire in 1534–1536 and 1540–1541, in which capacity he attended the Diet of Regensburg in 1541. In his later career he led three embassies to the Holy See in 1550 and 1555.

== Life ==
Contarini was born in Venice in 1477, the second son of Zaccaria Contarini and Alda Donà di Antonio. His early life was comfortable, passed in entertainments, including the plays of the Fausti.

=== Father's captivity ===
In June 1509, his father was taken prisoner by the French at the Battle of Agnadello. Surviving correspondence shows Contarini to have been heavily involved in negotiations for his release. His father wrote to inform him that he was being kept in a castle near Paris and treated humanely. He also received letters from his brother Paolo and from another prisoner, Gian Giacomo Caroldo. He wrote to the French commanders, the Admiral de Boissy and the Cardinal de Boissy.

In May 1510, Contarini put 2,000 ducats into the treasury of the Council of Ten to pay for a prisoner swap, although his money was ultimately returned and no prisoners were exchanged. He thereafter opposed all prisoner exchanges that did not include his father, scuttling a planned exchange favoured by the Sanuto in October 1510. In the end, his money was refunded and his father died in prison after sending him his ring in November 1512. In August 1513, Contarini was appointed to his first political office, that of auditor novo. In 1514, he purchased a seat in the Senate for 2,000 ducats.

=== Savio di Terraferma ===
On 7 June 1515, Contarini sailed from Venice to the Holy Land on a pilgrimage. Upon his return, he purchased a seat on the Council of Ten for 1,500 ducats. He was a councillor from October 1516 to September 1517. On 3 September 1518, he was elected to succeed Francesco Cornaro as ambassador to the Kingdom of Aragon. He never took up the post, although the appointment was never formally revoked. On 3 March 1520, he was elected one of the Savi of the Terraferma. He was reelected in 1521, 1522, 1523, 1525 and 1526.

On 6 June 1526, Contarini, to his dismay, was elected ambassador to England following the death of Lorenzo Orio. He fell ill before leaving, an illness Marino Sanuto attributes to his disconsolation. Marcantonio Venier was sent in his stead. As a result of his second failure as ambassador, Contarini was blacklisted from public office in 1527. On 9 Ocobter 1528, he was named paymaster of the Full College. In 1529, he was elected provveditore sopra i danari. He was one of the Savi di Terraferma again in 1531–1533. His terms were occupied by property disputes between the republic and the Benedictines of Correzzola.

=== Ambassador ===
On 26 November 1534, Contarini was commissioned as ambassador to Ferdinand I, King of the Romans, arriving in Vienna before the year's end. His main goal was to preserve Venetian neutrality in the Habsburg–Ottoman war, but he was also tasked with securing the restoration of the fiefs of Belgrado and Castelnuovo to the Savorgnan. His dispatches include interesting perspectives on the Protestant Reformation, including the decline of Catholicism in Austria and the crushing of the Münster rebellion. In a coded dispatch of 23 April 1535, he describes the efforts of Bishop Bernardo Clesio, on behalf of Pope Paul III and Emperor Charles V, to persuade Venice to join the Holy League.

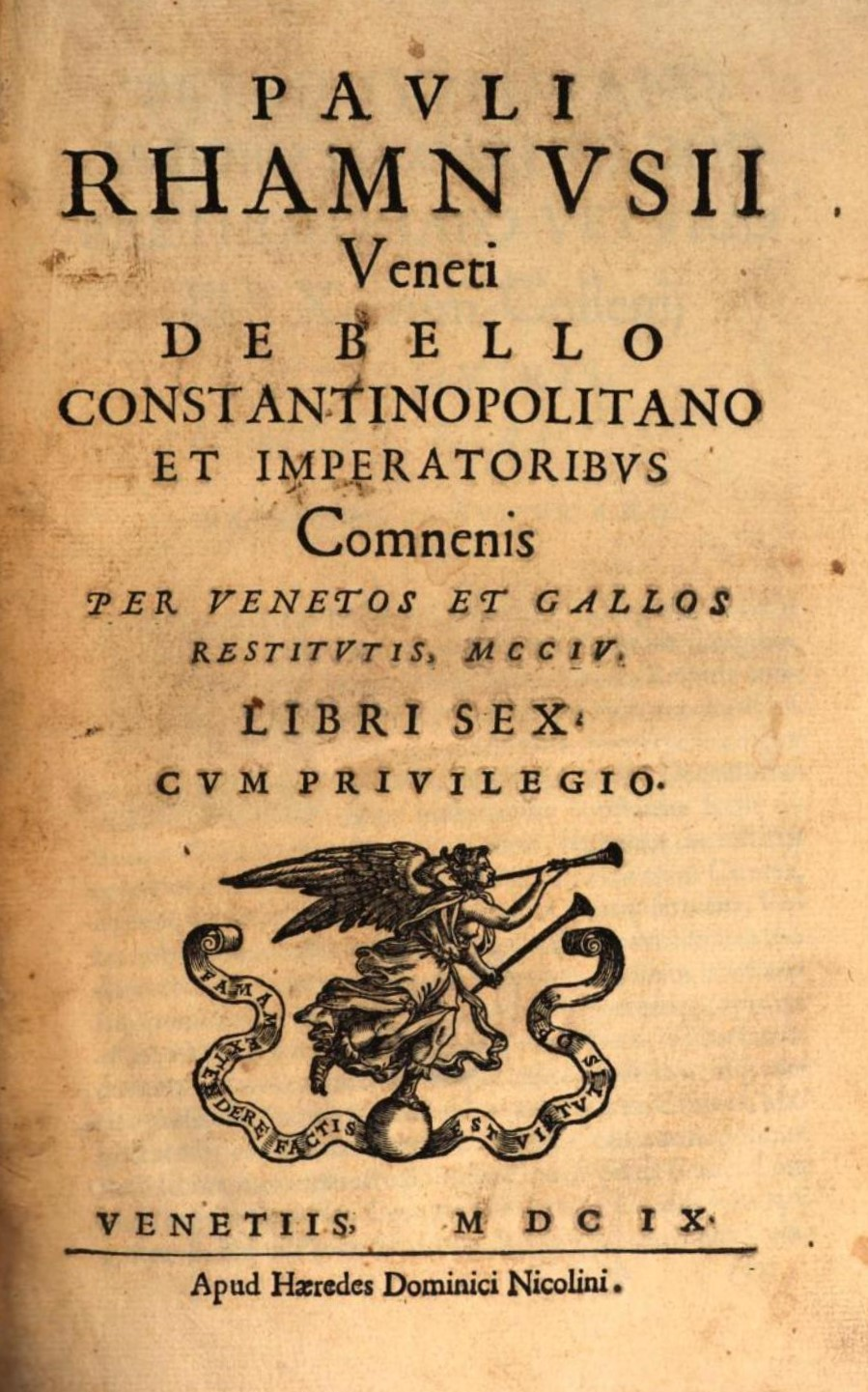
Titlepage of Ramusio's Latin version of Villehardouin's Conquête from 1609

In April 1536, Contarini was replaced as ambassador by Paolo Cappello. Elected ambassador to the court of Charles V, he left Venice on 7 August 1539. He issued his first dispatch as ambassador on 28 April 1540. He followed the imperial court after it left Ghent and passed through Antwerp, Brussels, Bruges, Utrecht, Luxembourg, Speyer and Nuremberg. His dispatches mostly concerned the upcoming Diet of Regensburg (1541). In Brussels, he acquired a manuscript of Geoffrey of Villehardouin's account of the Fourth Crusade in French, De la Conquête de Constantinople. In Nuremberg, he visited Desiderius Erasmus. He attended the Diet of Regensburg and reported on the failure of Catholic–Protestant reconciliation. Speaking of the ongoing war between Pope Clement VII and Ascanio Colonna, Contarini reported that:

Everyone has concluded that just as the emperor seeks in every possible way to make peace, to calm the princes, and to support and defend the affairs of the pope, so His Holiness does everything to start a fire in Italy and to keep it going, things that are not fitting for the vicar of Christ. And everyone speaks of these things publicly.

In August 1541, Contarini was succeeded by Francesco Sanuto. Upon his return to Venice, he gave his manuscript of Villehardouin to the Council of Ten. Although it is now lost, Giovanni Battista Ramusio was commissioned by the Council of Ten to make a translation of the Conquête into Italian in 1556, which was later translated and elaborated into Latin by his son, Paolo (published 1609). Contarini may also have brought back documents relating to the Mexican expedition of Francisco Vázquez de Coronado. These are known only through the versions published by Ramusio.

=== Later years ===
In 1542, Contarini returned with Sanuto to Trent as commissioners for settling a border dispute between the republic and the Holy Roman Empire. He was knighted for his services. In 1543, he was one of the Savi del Consiglio for the first time. That year, he and Antonio Cappello successfully negotiated with Pietro Strozzi for the return of Marano to the republic. During his later years, he was frequently among the Savi del Consiglio and often the consigliere (councillor) representing the sestiere of Dorsoduro on the Ducal Council.

From May 1551 to September 1552, Contarini was the captain of Padua. During this period, Tommaso Giunti dedicated to him his work De balneis, a treatise on balneotherapy. Contarini undertook special embassies of congratulation to the newly elected popes Julius III (1550), Marcellus II (1555) and Paul IV (1555). He was one of the ducal electors of 1553 (Marcantonio Trevisan) and 1556 (Lorenzo Priuli). He was also the corrector of the promissione ducale in 1556. On 16 October 1556, he was named a procurator of Saint Mark. He died in Venice on 11 March 1558.
