= Francesco Contarini (disambiguation) =

Francesco Contarini (1556–1624) was a Doge of Venice.

Francesco Contarini may also refer to:

- Francesco Contarini (humanist) (born 1421), a Doctor of Arts honoured in a speech by Niccolò Barbo
- Francesco Contarini (1477–1558), Venetian diplomat

== See also ==
- Pietro Francesco Contarini (1502–1555), patriarch of Venice
