= Martin of Pairis =

Cistercian abbot, crusader, and writer

Martin (floruit 1200–1207) was the abbot of the Cistercian monastery of Pairis in Alsace, then part of the German kingdom in the Holy Roman Empire. Martin played a supporting role on the Fourth Crusade. He was a major source for the Historia Constantinopolitana, a history of the Fourth Crusade written by the monk Gunther of Pairis. Gunther's Historia serves as both a eulogy on the life of Martin and also an account of the translation of relics Martin brought to Pairis from the crusade. Gunther describes Martin as pleasant-looking, affable, eloquent, humble and wise.

Martin's native tongue was Alsatian German and he also spoke Latin. He is sometimes given the surname Litz. This, however, is based on a misreading by Henricus Canisius of the word licet.

== Leading the Upper Rhenish contingent ==
Martin was urged to join the crusade by Pope Innocent III. He was responsible for preaching the crusade all along the Upper Rhine. He began his preaching tour in Basel Cathedral no later than September 1201, when he was at Cîteaux to receive permission to go on crusade from the head of his order. At the beginning of 1202, he had an army of 1,200 men from the region. Before setting out he committed it to the protection of the Virgin Mary. Unarmed himself, he led the army via Innsbruck across the Brenner Pass and via Trent to the rendezvous at Venice. Owing to the delay of the crusade's scheduled departure, he stayed in Verona for eight weeks in May–June 1202. He arrived in Venice shortly before 13 August.

When the leaders of the crusade considered assisting the Venetians in a siege of Zara, a Christian city belonging to King Emeric of Hungary, Martin requested the papal legate, Peter of Capua, to absolve him of his vow. The legate refused, but urged Martin to do everything he could to prevent the shedding of Christian blood. Peter also placed him in charge of the entire German contingent, according to Gunther, but more likely just its spiritual direction. According to Martin's eyewitness account, as relayed by Gunther, the crusaders besieged Zara reluctantly and without joy, but vigorously so as to induce its quick surrender and avoid excess bloodshed.

Through the siege of Zara (ended 24 November 1202) the crusaders incurred excommunication and Martin was among the delegation sent by the leaders of the crusade to obtain papal forgiveness and the lifting of the ban. He may have been the representative of the contingent from Germany, or he may have joined the delegation on his own initiative in order to use his audience with the pope to renew his request to be released to return to his abbey.

== In the Holy Land and Constantinople ==
After Pope Innocent III denied his renewed request, Martin went with Peter of Capua to Benevento. When they received news of the planned diversion of the crusade to Constantinople to place Alexios IV on the Byzantine throne, they decided not to return to the main army. From Siponto Martin sailed with the legate to Saint-Jean d'Acre in the Kingdom of Jerusalem. He arrived in Acre on 25 April 1203 during an outbreak of plague. There he met many Germans who had been in his charge in Venice but who had, like him, abandoned the army either before or after Zara and gone on to the Holy Land to fulfill their vows.

Martin stayed in Acre for six months ministering to the sick. On 8 November 1203, after the truce with the Ayyubids had been broken, Martin and Conrad of Schwarzenberg were sent to Constantinople to request assistance from the main army. They arrived at Constantinople on 1 January 1204 but, since nobody could be spared from the main army, they waited. Martin took the subsequent sack of Constantinople (13–15 April) as an opportunity to seize relics for his monastery. He forced an old priest in the Church of the Pantocrator to show him where the church's relics were hidden and helped himself to as much as he could carry.

Martin was present at the election and coronation of Baldwin IX of Flanders as emperor. According to Gunther, he was offered a bishopric in Thessalonica by Boniface I of Montferrat, but declined it.

Martin left Constantinople on 15 August 1204, returning to Acre on 1 October. In Acre, he showed off his newly acquired relics to the Alsatian nobleman Werner of Egisheim, who urged him to stay in Acre at the head of a new Carmelite monastery. He declined, but he did stay in Acre long enough to procure further relics there. According to Gunther, Martin obtained a piece of the True Cross, a trace of the blood of Jesus and relics from a long list of saints, but he does not distinguish between those taken from Constantinople or Acre.

== Return to Pairis ==
Martin embarked for his return voyage on 31 March 1205, sailing in the same convoy as Conrad of Krosigk, bishop of Halberstadt. They arrived in Venice on 28 May. He traveled back to his monastery by way of the Alpine passes and Basel, where his crusade had begun. He arrived back in Pairis on 24 June 1205.

The monks of Pairis seem to have elected a certain Werner as abbot during Martin's absence. Perhaps having not heard from him, they suspected he had died.While Werner was acting abbot, King Philip of Germany placed the abbey under royal protection. He renewed this act of protection in 1206 or 1207, probably because of Martin's unexpected return. In gratitude, the monks gave the king a reliquary tablet.

== Sources ==
- Andrea, A. J. (1993). "The Devastatio Constantinopolitana, A Special Perspective on the Fourth Crusade: An Analysis, New Edition, and Translation". Historical Reflections. 19 (1): 107–129, 131–149.
- Andrea, A. J., ed. (1997). The Capture of Constantinople: The "Hystoria Constantinopolitana" of Gunther of Pairis. University of Pennsylvania Press.
- Eichenlaub, J.-L. (1995). L'Abbaye de Pairis dans la haute vallée de la Weiss: de la fondation en 1138 à l'hôpital contemporain. Société d'histoire du canton de Lapoutroie.
- Folda, J. (2005). Crusader Art in the Holy Land: From the Third Crusade to the Fall of Acre. Cambridge University Press.
- Klintworth, G. (2015). "Le transfert d'un reliquaire byzantin à Maastricht: Mystère autour d'un abbé de Saint-Magloire de Paris". Francia. 42: 51–72. doi:10.11588/fr.2015.0.44568.
- Longnon, J. (1978). Les compagnons de Villehardouin: Recherches sur les croisés de la quatrième croisade. Librairie Droz.
- Pannenborg, A. (1873). "Magister Guntherus und seine Schriften". Forschungen zur Deutschen Geschichte. 13: 225–331.
- Queller, D. E.; Compton, T. K.; Campbell, D. A. (1974). "The Fourth Crusade: The Neglected Majority". Speculum. 49 (3): 441–465. doi:10.2307/2851751. JSTOR 2851751. S2CID 163442765.
- Queller, D. E.; Madden, T. F. (1997). The Fourth Crusade: The Conquest of Constantinople (2nd ed.). University of Pennsylvania Press.
- Swietek, F. R. (1978). "Gunther of Pairis and the Historia Constantinopolitana". Speculum. 52 (1): 49–79. doi:10.2307/2855606. JSTOR 2855606. S2CID 162193399.
