= Giordano Forzatè =

Paduan Benedictine monk and religious leader

Giordano Forzatè, anglicized as Jordan Forzatè (1158 – 7 August 1248), was a Paduan Benedictine monk and religious leader. For his noble background, peacemaking efforts, and monastic reforms, the Chronicle of the Trevisan March calls him the pater Padue, "father of Padua".

== Monk ==
According to tradition, Giordano was born at Padua in 1158. His family, the Forzatè branch of the Tanselgardi (or Transelgardi), belonged to the upper ranks of the aristocracy of the Trevisan March, part of the Kingdom of Italy in the Holy Roman Empire. They were probably vassals of the bishop of Padua. A relative, Forzatè di Tanselgardino, was the lawyer of the Abbey of Santa Giustina in the early 13th century.

Giordano is first mentioned as a monk of San Benedetto Vecchio in a document from 1203. This monastery may have been founded by his family. Documents from the following years show that he received substantial sums of money through inheritance and trusts. He earned a reputation as a local peacemaker.

Giordano was probably a doctor of canon law (decretorum doctor). On 7 June 1211, Pope Innocent III nominated him to the bishopric of Ferrara, but he declined, preferring to play a larger role in his native Padua and in the Benedictine Order. He served as apostolic delegate in Padua in 1213–14 (when he oversaw the election of Bishop Giordano following the death of Gerardo Offreducci) and in 1229 (when he oversaw the election of Giacomo Corrado).

== Prior ==
fundator pater

=== Monastic reformer ===
By 1213, Giordano had become prior of San Benedetto. He founded a new movement, called the Albi (whites) or more fully ordo monachorum alborum Sancti Benedicti de Padua (order of white monks of Saint Benedict of Padua), which aimed to combine hospitals with communities of canons, male and female monastics and hermits. On 30 May 1224, with the approval of the bishop, and with the support of six priors of the municipal houses, the first congregation of Albi was founded in Padua. The six other municipal priories also became the seats of communities of Albi. On 7 June 1234 in Rieti, Pope Gregory IX issued a bull confirming the new order.

Giordano also reformed the Benedictine monasteries of Santa Maria in Vanzo and Santa Maria di Porciglia. He pioneered the intimate connection of monastery and municipality that has been called "communal monasticism". After his death, the commune of Padua entrusted its books to the safekeeping of the Albi.

Giordano's ideals were not far from those of the mendicant orders. He was present as a witness at the first donation of land to the Dominican Order in Padua in October 1226, and he intervened with the bishop on behalf of the canonization of Anthony of Padua in 1232. In 1227, he performed a visitation of Benedictine houses exempt from episcopal jurisdiction, of congregations of canons regular and Humiliati and of the hospitals of Padua, Venice and Treviso. Giordano's stature in Padua can be gauged by the great number of testamentary bequests he received. He was said to have convinced Beatrice d'Este, daughter of Azzo VI, to renounce the world.

=== Politics ===
Giordano undertook several missions as apostolic delegate for Innocent III, Honorius III and Gregory IX. In 1216, he was sent to the financially troubled bishopric of Treviso. In 1217, he investigated the election of the bishop of Ceneda and the work of the apostolic administrator in Vicenza. In 1218, he was present to supervise the handover by the bishop of Treviso of his right to levy tolls to the commune of Treviso.

Giordano was a close ally of the House of Este and in the intercommunal conflicts of the Guelphs and Ghibellines aligned with the pro-papal Guelph faction. The hostile pro-imperial Ghibelline chronicler Gerardo Maurisio of Vicenza calls him evil, hypocritical, conspiratorial and "the author and prince of all discord in the March" of Treviso (totius discordie Marchie auctor et princeps). Contemporary chronicles are clear, however, that Giordano was one of the most respected political actors in the Trevisan March. According Rolandino of Padua, Padua and Vicenza voluntarily submitted to his arbitration and Padua "entrusted many things" to him.

Giordano regularly attended meetings of the council of Padua, offering advice and acting on their behalf. He was present for the signing of the treaty of peace between Padua and Venice following the War of the Castle of Love in 1216. On behalf of the commune, he arbitrated a dispute between the commune of Vicenza and Ezzelino II and Ezzelino III da Romano in 1218. He ordered the Ezzelini to hand over to Vicenza the castle of Marostica. He mediated between some Vicenzan aristocrats and the podestà Lorenzo da Brescia in 1222–1223. He was present when Padua conceded the right of toll-free transit of goods to the Venetian monastery of Santa Maria delle Vergini on 19 September 1229. In that year, he also strove to prevent open warfare between Padua and Treviso after the latter had, at the instigation of Ezzelino III da Romano, occupied the towns of Feltre and Belluno.

== Arrest, exile and death ==
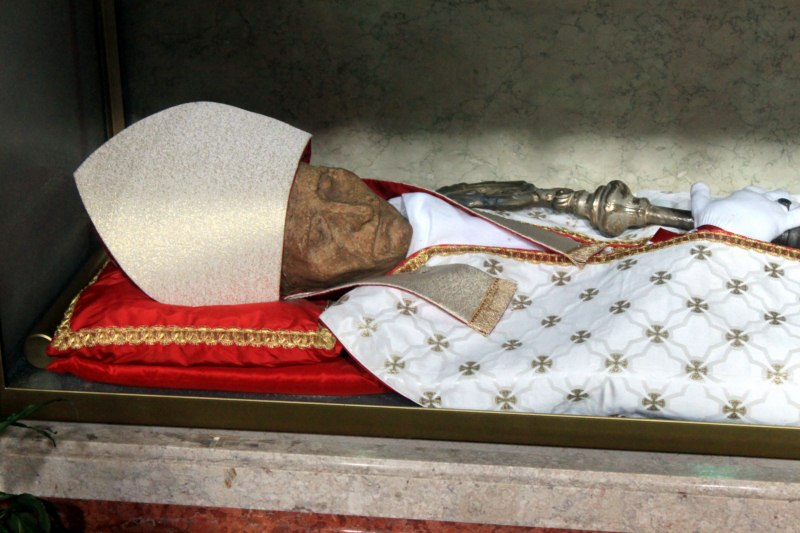
The incorrupt body of Giordano in Padua

In 1235, Giordano supported the election of Azzo VII d'Este as podestà of Vicenza. The following year the city was occupied by the Emperor Frederick II, who entrusted it to Ezzelino III. On 25 February 1237, Ezzelino also took control of Padua. At first, fearing reprisals, Giordano took refuge in his family's castle at Montemerlo, but he later returned to the city, where he was arrested in June. The bishop of Padua and Pope Gregory IX intervened on his behalf with the emperor, who ordered his release. He was not allowed to remain in Padua, however, as a concession to Ezzelino. Giordano's later reputation as the "father of Padua" owes much to his showdown with Ezzelino, who became the archetypal tyrant in Paduan historical memory.

In exile, Giordano went first to the patriarchate of Aquileia, where he is recorded on 26 May 1239. He later decided to leave the Empire entirely and took refuge in the monastery of Santa Maria della Celestia in the Republic of Venice. He died there on 7 August 1248. His body was returned to Padua in 1260. In the following century, a hagiographical tradition developed. His cult was approved by Pope Clement XIII in 1767. His feast is celebrated on 7 August.
