= Gunther of Pairis =

German Cistercian monk and author

Gunther of Pairis (c. 1150 – c. 1220) was a German Cistercian monk and author, writing in Latin.

== Biography ==
He was born around 1150, in the southwest of the Holy Roman Empire (possibly near Basel) to a knightly family. It is uncertain how he had acquired his demonstrated high erudition and classical learning for the time.

Before entering monastic life at Pairis Abbey around 1203, Gunther served as a scholasticus (teacher) at the court of Emperor Frederick I Barbarossa, where he taught Conrad, the emperor's third eldest son.

== Works ==
His best-known work is his Historia Constantinopolitana about the Fourth Crusade, which was likely completed before the end of 1205, with the exception of chapter 25 which he appended later. In a mixture of prose and verse, it was based on the account of Martin of Pairis, abbot of Pairis Abbey, and includes the siege and looting of Constantinople. His is the only western account to state explicitly that the crusaders pillaged Greek churches, as the other accounts were written by the pillagers themselves, such as Geoffrey of Villehardouin, who wrote The Conquest of Constantinople.

He was the author of Solimarius (c. 1180), a verse narrative about the First Crusade, dedicated to Conrad of Hohenstaufen. This was largely a poetic version of Robert of Reims's Historia Hierosolymitana.

Another of his works was Ligurinus, an epic poem about Frederick Barbarossa, based on Otto of Freising's Gesta Frederici (books 2–4).
