= Robert de Clari =

Picard knight and participant in the Fourth Crusade

Robert de Clari (or Cléry, the modern name of the place, on the commune of Pernois) was a knight from Picardy. He participated in the Fourth Crusade with his lord, Count Peter of Amiens, and his brother, Aleaumes, and left a chronicle of the events in Old Picard, De la Conquête de Constantinople. Robert's account of the crusade is especially valuable because of his status as a lower vassal; most other eyewitness accounts are from the leadership of the crusade, like Villehardouin. Robert's descriptions often shed light on some of the crusader activities that are otherwise glossed over by the higher rank sources.

== Brother Aleaumes ==
Robert's brother, Aleaumes, was an armed cleric who distinguished himself during the final siege of Constantinople, when the usurping emperor Alexius V "Murzuphlus" Ducas was routed by the crusaders. Robert included in his chronicle a brief account of his brother's apparently foolhardy bravery during the final capture of the city, when Aleaumes was the first man within the walls, and later mentioned a dispute concerning the division of spoils which Aleaumes deserved. One of the prominent noble leaders of the crusade, Count Hugh of Saint-Pol, judged in favor of Aleaumes.

== Shroud of Turin ==
Robert may be one of the few documented witnesses to the Shroud of Turin before 1358. He reports (1204 or later) that the cloth was in Constantinople, in the church of Blachernae: "Where there was the Shroud in which our Lord had been wrapped, which every Friday was raised upright/raised itself upright (se dressoit tout droite) so observers could see the figure of our Lord on it. No one, either Greek or French, ever knew what became of the Shroud after the capture of the City." However, the historians Thomas F. Madden and Donald Queller describe this part of Robert's account as a mistake, as he wrote in old Picard French: Robert had actually seen or heard of the sudarium, the handkerchief of Saint Veronica (which also purportedly contained the image of Jesus), and confused it with the grave cloth (sindon). As there is no mention of this "shroud" in any other contemporary source, the historian Andrea Nicolotti suggests that Robert's account is quite a confused description of the famous miracle that occurred every Friday in the church of Blachernae: the so-called “habitual miracle”, that consisted in the prodigious elevation of a cloth before an icon of the Virgin. Nicolotti adds that Constantinople kept meticulous inventories of imperial relics, including those looted by the Latins after the sack of Constantinople. The actual recorded Greek sindon, was also described as plain linen without any human image on it.

== The Conquest of Constantinople ==
Clari wrote an account of the Fourth Crusade which follows the Crusade until 1205. Clari, who was a poor knight, provides the view of the rank and file and although he was not privy to the discussions of the leadership he does provide camp rumours and the reality of the combat. Clari viewed the Byzantines as treacherous and had a favourable view of the Venetians.
