= Pairis Abbey =

Abbey in Haut-Rhin, France

Coordinates: 48°7′2.11″N 7°7′39.2″E

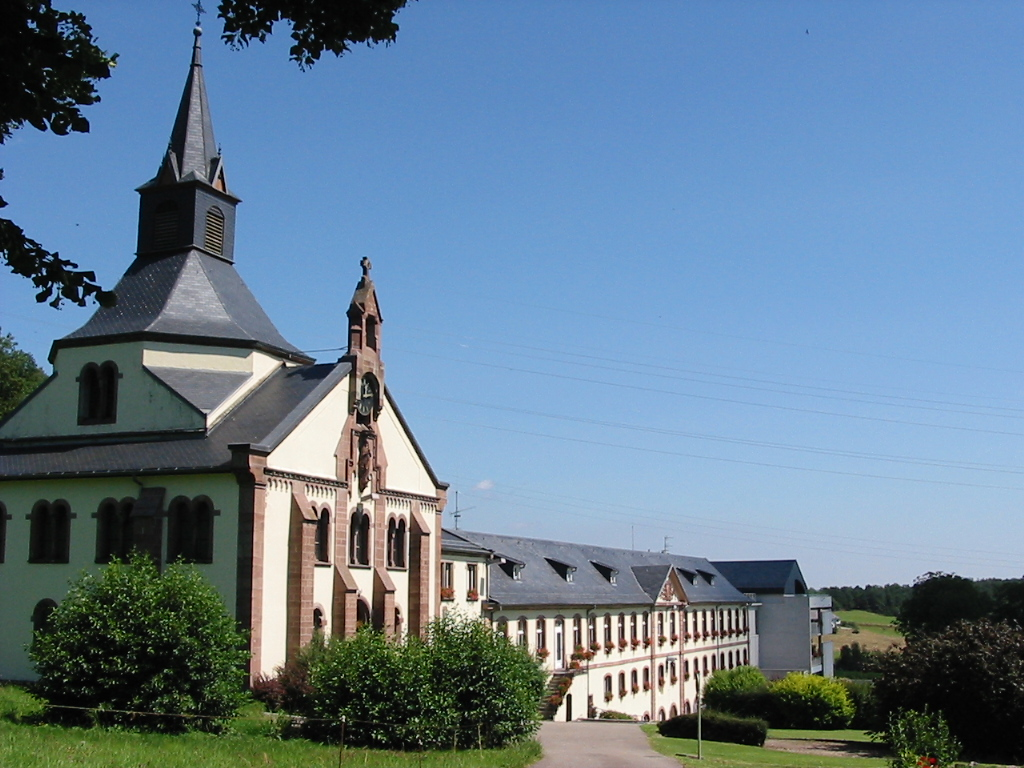
Pairis Abbey

Pairis Abbey is a former Cistercian monastery in Orbey in Haut-Rhin, Alsace, northeastern France. The surviving building serves today as a nursing home.

The abbey was founded in 1138 by the Count of Eguisheim as a daughter house of Lucelle Abbey.

In the 13th century, abbot Martin of Pairis preached the Fourth Crusade and then participated in the misfire of it. After taking active part in the sacking of Constantinople, Martin brought several looted relics from there to Pairis, increasing the status of the monastery considerably. The monk Gunther of Pairis wrote an account of the crusade.

The abbey was joined to the Abbey of Maulbronn in 1452, confirmed by the Cistercian general chapter in 1453 and Pope Pius II in 1461. In 1648, Maulbronn was turned over to the Protestant Duchy of Württemberg by the Peace of Westphalia. The Cistercians were forced to leave and they re-established the abbey of Pairis.

The abbey was suppressed during the French Revolution.

== List of known abbots ==
1. Tegenhard (Degenhardus) : 1138–1183
2. Wezelon : 1175–1187
3. Werner : 1187
4. Martin (Litz) : 1200–1207
5. Hezelon : 1207–1222
6. Conrad : 1232–1239
7. John I : 1240
8. Arnold : 1252–1260
9. John II : 1262–1275
10. Berthold (von Rapolzwihr) : 1279–1280
11. Ulrich von Turckheim : 1280–1283
12. Dietrich : 1288–1294
13. Philipp von Rathsamhausen : 1301–1306 (bishop of Eichstätt in 1306–1322)
14. Henry : 1306–1330
15. Hartmann : 1331
16. Louis : 1332–1333
17. John (III) of Hattstatt : 1339–1361 (counsellor of Emperor Charles IV)
18. John (IV) Uszholtz : 1362
19. Louis II : 1368–1374
20. Conrad II : 1376–1379
21. Tielman : 1381–1388
22. Berthold Halder : 1389–1411
23. Nicholas von Ingwiller : 1411–1430
24. Nicholas von Schweighausen : 1430–1447

According to the abbey's necrology, there were 23 abbots down to 1447, so it is possible that John III and John IV are one and the same person.

1. Bernardin Buchinger : 1649–1656 (abbot of Lucelle in 1654–1673)
2. Olivier de Foulongne : 1656–1691
3. Claude de Beauquemare : 1692–1726
4. Jacques Triboulet : 1726–1736
5. Mathieu Tribout : 1736–1759
6. François Xavier Bourste : 1759–1788
7. Antoine Delort : 1789–1791

== Sources ==
- Jean-Luc Eichenlaub: L'Abbaye de Pairis dans la haute vallée de la Weiss: de la fondation en 1138 à l'hôpital contemporain. Société d'histoire du canton de Lapoutroie, 1995.
- Bernhard Buchinger, Abt von Lützel: Tabula mortuorum Parisiensium 1650. Stadtbibliothek Colmar. In: Julius Rathgeber (Hrsg.): Die Herrschaft Rappoltstein. Beiträge zur Geschichtskunde des Ober-Elsasses, zum Theil aus urkundlichen Quellen. F. Wolff, Strassburg 1874, S. 58 ff.
- Joseph M. B. Clauss (Hrsg.): Das Nekrolog der Cisterzienser-Abtei Pairis. In: Mitteilungen der Gesellschaft für Erhaltung der geschichtlichen Denkmäler im Elsass. 2. Folge, 22. Band, 1904, ZDB-ID 215236-8, S. 55–103.
- Carl Weinmann: Hymnarium Parisiense. Das Hymnar der Zisterzienser-Abtei Pairis im Elsaß. Aus zwei Codices des 12. u. 13. Jahrhunderts. Herausgegeben und kommentiert. Pustet, Regensburg 1904, S. 10 (Freiburg (Schweiz), Universität, phil. Dissertation, 1904).
- Andreas Bauch: Das theologisch-aszetische Schrifttum des Eichstätter Bischofs Philipp von Rathsamhausen (1306–1322) (= Eichstätter Studien. Bd. 6, ISSN 0170-9402). Verlag der katholischen Kirche in Bayern, Eichstätt 1948.
- Fondation Mécénat (Hrsg.): Das Vermächtnis der Jahrhunderte. 2000 Jahre elsässische Schriften. Fondation Mécénat, Science et Art, Strasbourg 1989.
- Gertrud Löbell, Isabelle Bräutigam: Elsass. Ausflugserlebnisse für die Familie durchs ganze Jahr (= Entdeckt – erlebt – verliebt). Schauenburg, Lahr 1996, ISBN 3-7946-0444-X, S. 79–80.
- Stefan Schmidt: Das Chorgestühl von Marienau und die Geschichte der Abtei. 2. Auflage. Selbstverlag des Verfassers, Wyhl am Kaiserstuhl 2004.
