= De la Conquête de Constantinople =

Historical French prose

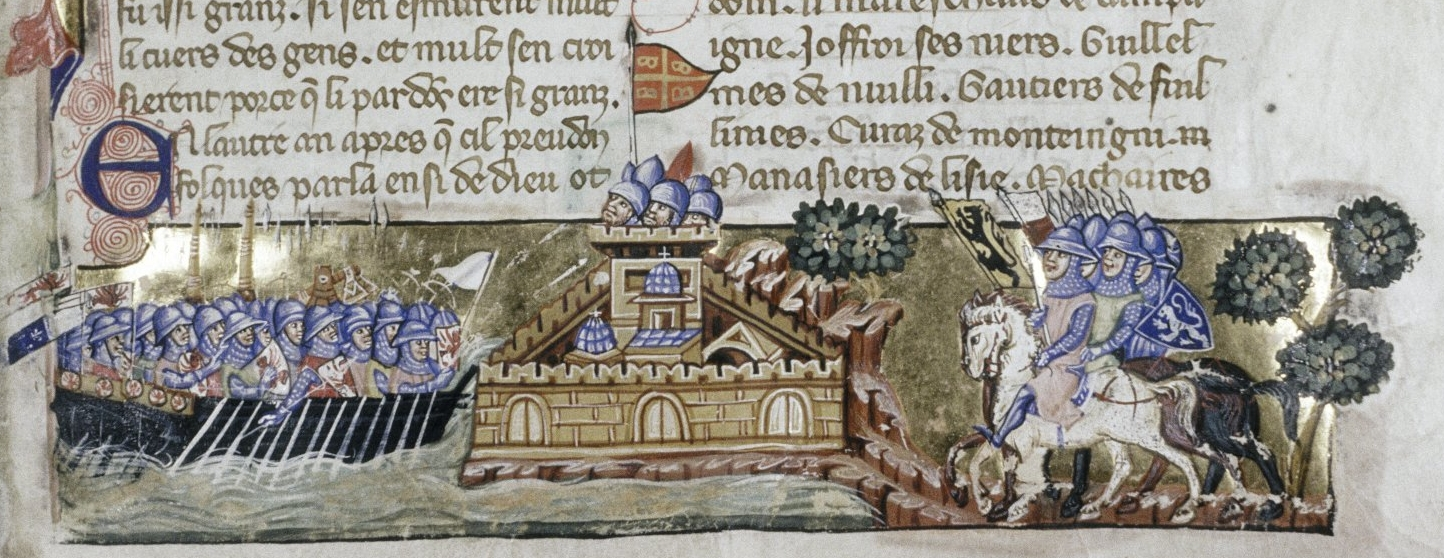
Miniature depicting the Crusader attack on Constantinople from an early 14th-century edition of Villehardouin's work

De la Conquête de Constantinople (On the Conquest of Constantinople) is the oldest surviving example of French historical prose and one of the most important sources for the Fourth Crusade. It was written by Geoffrey of Villehardouin, a knight and crusader, who was an eyewitness to the sack of Constantinople on 13 April 1204.

== Background ==
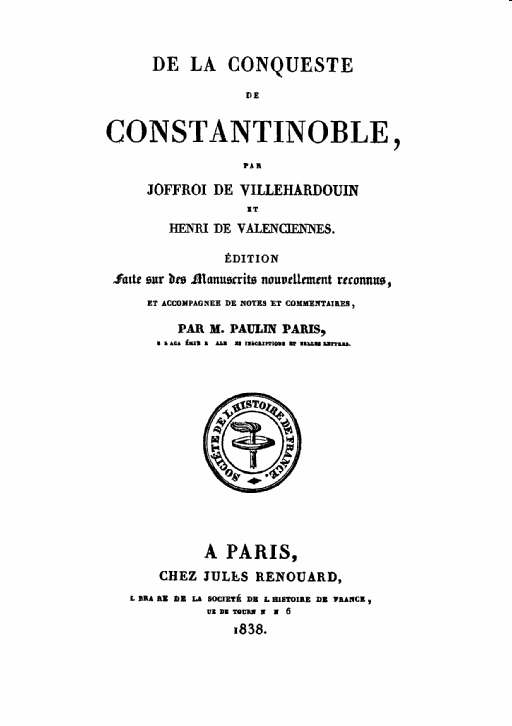
Title page of an 1838 printed edition of the Chronicle

Villehardouin was present at the origins of the Crusade during the 1199 tournament held by Thibauld III of Champagne. Throughout the five-year crusade he acted as an envoy, an ambassador, a councilman, and even a military leader at the Battle of Adrianople in 1205. Several years later, Villehardouin took the time to write down his account.

Villehardouin chose to write his work in epic fashion. He writes his work in the third-person, and combines objectivity and ecclesiastical points-of-view. A common technique in his work is to narrate a battle or episode along subjective and even militaristic guidelines, and follow this with his personal and religious explanation of what the results were.

Villehardouin makes constant hints and references to future events and the unknowingness of the participants at this moment. He defines the outcome in his own terms and does not allow the audience to reach their own conclusion for the actions of the participants. He recapitulates the events leading to Alexis's negotiations with the Crusaders. Compare this to Robert de Clari's account of the Fourth Crusade.

His Crusade is more than just a Holy War, it is an event of such great magnitude that he must recapture it within his work in lengthy detail and describe the actors. Villehardouin describes the Doge of Venice (Enrico Dandolo) as a blind man who valiantly leads his men into battle. Contemporary studies are undecided but lean towards this man being only short-sighted or having poor eyesight. He makes many references to The Song of Roland. Much like this earlier epic, Villehardouin describes the French Army as elected to execute God's will. When Villehardouin describes how Count Louis refuses to leave the field, there is a clear reference to the functions of Roland's climax in his epic.

Villehardouin's words — while sometimes accurate and other times not — present a vivid personal account of the Fourth Crusade. From the outset, Villehardouin states that he is a pilgrim, but he never explains this tenet of the Crusade. Another omission is Fulk of Neuilly's influence on the origins of the Fourth Crusade. Villehardouin merely reports of the successes of his work.

A misleading portion of the book is Villehardouin's treatment of the envoy and negotiations that lead to Venice being the central port for the Fourth Crusade. Many historians have described the calculation by Villehardouin on the number of men and horses needed as chivalrous enthusiasm combined with Christian idealism. Villehardouin claims that it is in fact the Venetians who were outwitted, but Villehardouin has overcalculated (only 11,000 showed up instead of over 33,000 as planned). Villehardouin directs attention to crusaders possibly leaving from other ports.

Villehardouin captures the Council at Zara with specific detail, and so creates a negative view of this portion of the Crusade. He describes how Zara's citizens pleaded with the Crusaders not to attack a Christian city and gives an unbiased description of the looting by the Crusaders. He also points out that the French would not attack Zara and that many deserted the Crusade. This attitude continues with his description of the Siege at Constantinople as well. He is appalled at the actions of the Crusaders and describes the destruction and thefts. He claims that Constantinople had prized and ancient relics equivalent to the rest of the world combined. Throughout his book, Villehardouin shows an understanding of history and of Greek culture that allows for a more complete view.

== Manuscripts ==
There are six principal manuscripts of De la Conquête. By their conventional sigla, they are:

- A — Paris, Bibliothèque nationale de France, fr. 4972
- B — Paris, Bibliothèque nationale de France, fr. 2137
- C — Paris, Bibliothèque nationale de France, fr. 12204
- D — Paris, Bibliothèque nationale de France, fr. 12203
- E — Paris, Bibliothèque nationale de France, fr. 24210
- O — Oxford, Bodleian Library, Laud. Misc. 587

These manuscripts are usually placed in two groups, I (AO) and II (BCDE), with I being the older and textually more valuable. Another manuscript belonging to group I and now lost was brought to Venice in 1541 by the ambassador Francesco Contarini. A literal translation into Italian was made from the Contarini manuscript by Giovanni Battista Ramusio, which survives in two manuscripts, now Cod. Marc. it. VII 138 (8749) and Cod. Marc. it. VII 139 (8324) in the Biblioteca Nazionale Marciana in Venice.

== Excerpt ==
The first paragraphs from the Chronicle are copied here:

Sachiez que mille cent quatre-vinz et dix huit ans après l'incarnation nostre seingnor Jésus Christ, al tens Innocent trois, apostoille de Rome, et Philippe, roi de France, et Richart, roi d’Angleterre, ot un saint home en France qui ot nom Folques de Nuilli. Cil Nuillis siet entre Lagny-sor-Marne et Paris; e il ère prestre et tenoit la paroiche de la ville. Et cil Folques dont je vous di, comença à parler de Dieu par France et par les autres terres entor, et Nostre Sires fist maint miracles por luy.

Sachiez que la renommée de cil saint home alla tant qu’elle vint a l'apostoille de Rome, Innocent; et l’apostoille envoya en France et manda al prod'ome que il empreschast des croiz par s’autorité. Et après y envoia un suen cardonal, maistre Perron de Chappes, croisié, et manda par luy le pardon tel come vos dirai: Tuit cil qui se croisieroient et feroient le service Dieu un an en l’ost, seroient quittes de toz les péchiez que il avoient faiz, dont il seroient confés. Por ce que cil pardons fu issi granz, si s’en esmeurent mult li cuers des gens; et mult s’encroisièrent por ce que li pardons ère si grans.

in translation:

Be it known to you that eleven hundred and ninety-seven years after the Incarnation of our Lord Jesus Christ, in the time of Innocent Pope of Rome, and Philip King of France, and Richard King of England, there was in France a holy man named Fulk of Neuilly - which Neuilly is between Lagni-sur-Marne and Paris - and he was a priest and held the cure of the village. And this said Fulk began to speak of God throughout the Isle-de-France, and the other countries round about; and you must know that by him the Lord wrought many miracles.

Be it known to you further, that the fame of this holy man so spread, that it reached the Pope of Rome, Innocent; and the Pope sent to France, and ordered the right worthy man to preach the cross (the Crusade) by his authority. And afterwards the Pope sent a cardinal of his, Master Peter of Capua, who himself had taken the cross, to proclaim the Indulgence of which I now tell you, viz., that all who should take the cross and serve in the host for one year, would be delivered from all the sins they had committed, and acknowledged in confession. And because this indulgence was so great, the hearts of men were much moved, and many took the cross for the greatness of the pardon.

== Sources ==
- Beer, Jeanette M. A. Villehardouin: Epic Historian, Librarie Droz, 1968
- Burckhardt, Jacob. Judgement on History and Historians, Garland Publishing, 1984
- Godfrey, John. 1204: The Unholy Crusade, Oxford University Press, 1980
- Joinville and Villehardouin. Chronicles of the Crusades, Penguin Books, 1963
- Michaud, Joseph Francois. Michaud's History of the Crusades, AMS Press, 1973
- Queller, Donald E. The Fourth Crusade, University of Pennsylvania Press, 1977
- Reginato, Irene; Burgio, Eugenio (2015). "Foundation Myths and Trade Conflicts: Ramusio, the Fourth Crusade and the Venetian Merchants' Crisis in the Sixteenth Century". In David A. Lines; Marc Laureys; Jill Kraye (eds.). Forms of Conflict and Rivalries in Renaissance Europe. V&R unipress. pp. 131–159.
- Reginato, Irene (2016). "Le Manuscrit Contarini de la Conquête de Constantinople dans un témoin indirect: Ramusio traducteur de Villehardouin". Romania. 134 (533): 31–76. doi:10.3406/roma.2016.7489.
- Saintsbury, George (1911). "Villehardouin, Geoffroy de" . In Chisholm, Hugh (ed.). Encyclopædia Britannica. Vol. 28 (11th ed.). Cambridge University Press. pp. 78–79. This contains a summary and critical review of the work.
- Smalley, Beryl (1974). Historians in the Middle Ages. Thames and Hudson. ISBN 0-684-14121-3.
