= Geoffrey of Villehardouin =

French historian

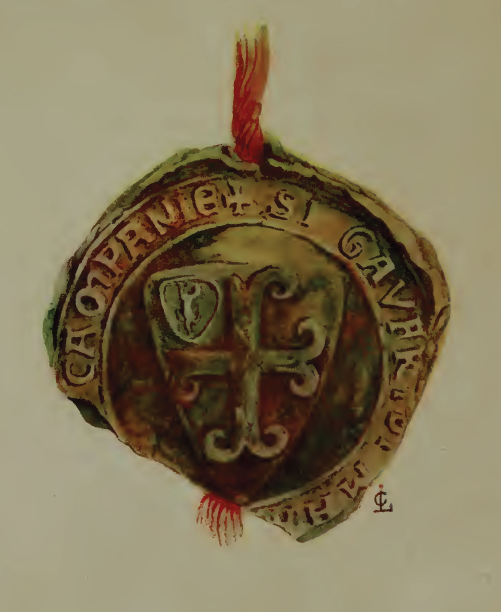
Seal of Geoffrey de Villehardouin

Geoffrey of Villehardouin (c. 1150 – c. 1213) was a French knight and historian who participated in and chronicled the Fourth Crusade. He is considered one of the most important historians of the time period, best known for writing the eyewitness account De la Conquête de Constantinople (On the Conquest of Constantinople), about the battle for Constantinople between the Christians of the West and the Christians of the East on 13 April 1204. The Conquest is the earliest French historical prose narrative that has survived to modern times. Ηis full title was: "Geoffroi of Villehardouin, Marshal of Champagne and of Romania".

== Biography ==
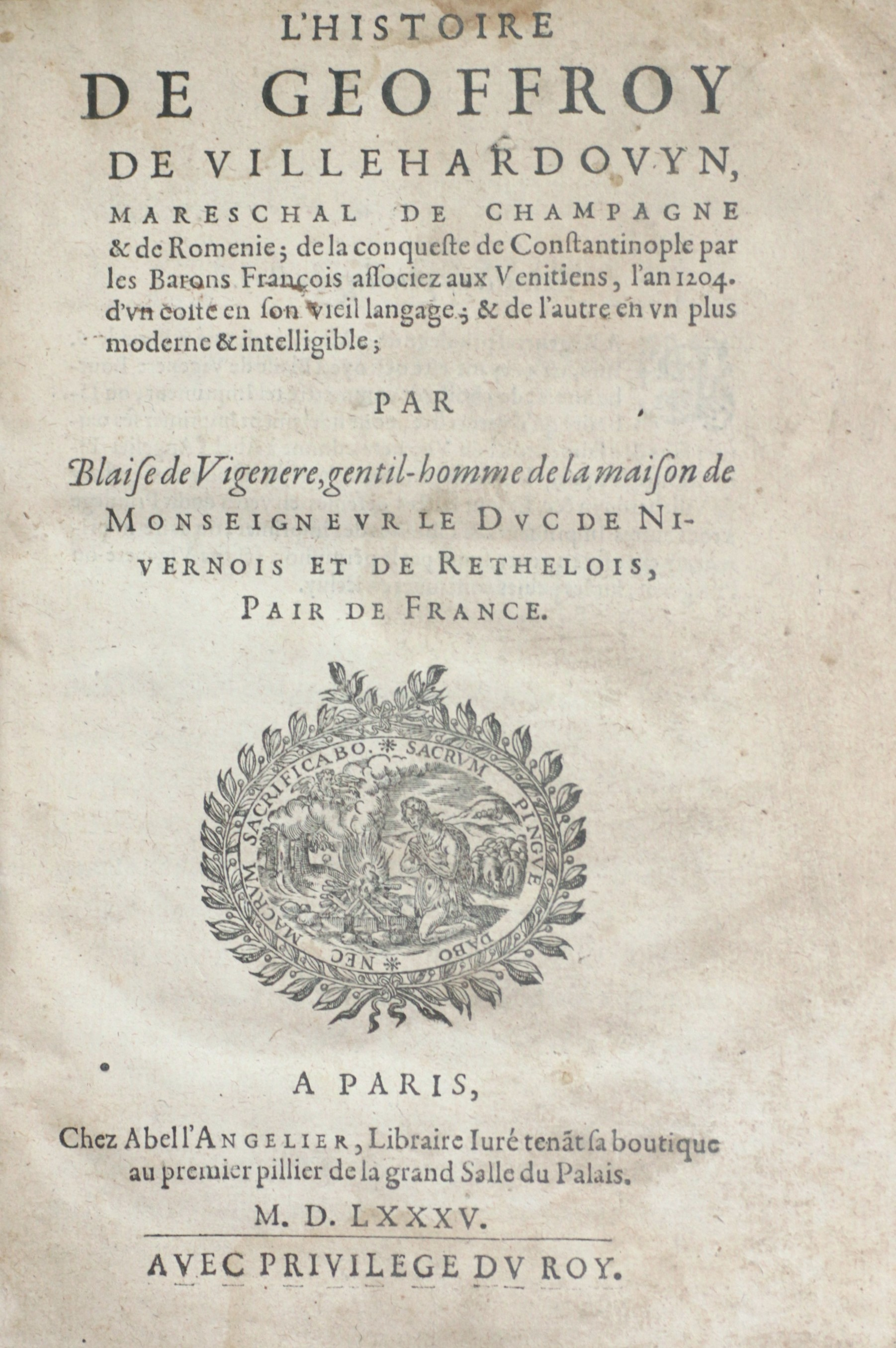
1585 edition with original text and translation in 16th-century French

A layman and a soldier, Geoffrey was appointed marshal of Champagne from 1185 and joined the Fourth Crusade in 1199 during a tournament held by Count Theobald III of Champagne. Thibaud named him one of the ambassadors to Venice to procure ships for the voyage, and he helped to elect Marquis Boniface I of Montferrat as the new leader of the Crusade when Theobald died.

Although Geoffrey does not say so specifically in his own account, he probably supported the diversion of the crusade first to Zara and then to Constantinople. While at Constantinople he also served as an ambassador to Emperor Isaac II Angelus, and was in the embassy that demanded that Isaac appoint Alexius IV co-emperor.

After the conquest of the Byzantine Empire in 1204 he served as a military leader, and led the retreat from the Battle of Adrianople in 1205 after Baldwin I was captured by the forces of the Second Bulgarian Empire. In recognition of his services, Boniface of Montferrat gave to Geoffrey the city of Messinopolis in Thrace. After the crusade, he was named Marshal of the Latin Empire.

In 1207, Geoffrey began to write his chronicle of the Crusade, On the Conquest of Constantinople. It was in French rather than Latin, making it one of the earliest works of French prose. Villehardouin's account is generally read alongside that of Robert of Clari, a French knight of low station, Niketas Choniates, a high-ranking Byzantine official and historian who gives an eyewitness account, and Gunther of Pairis, a Cistercian monk who tells the story from the perspective of Abbot Martin who accompanied the crusaders.

Villehardouin's nephew Geoffrey I of Villehardouin went on to become prince of Achaea in Morea (the medieval name for the Peloponnese) in 1209. Villehardouin himself seems to have died shortly afterwards. His son Erard had taken the title of seigneur de Villehardouin in 1213. There is evidence of his children raising memorials for him in 1218, suggesting he died around this time.

== See also ==
- Chronicle of the Morea
- Henry of Valenciennes
