= Peter of Capua the Elder =

13th-century Italian theologian, scholastic philosopher, cardinal and papal legate

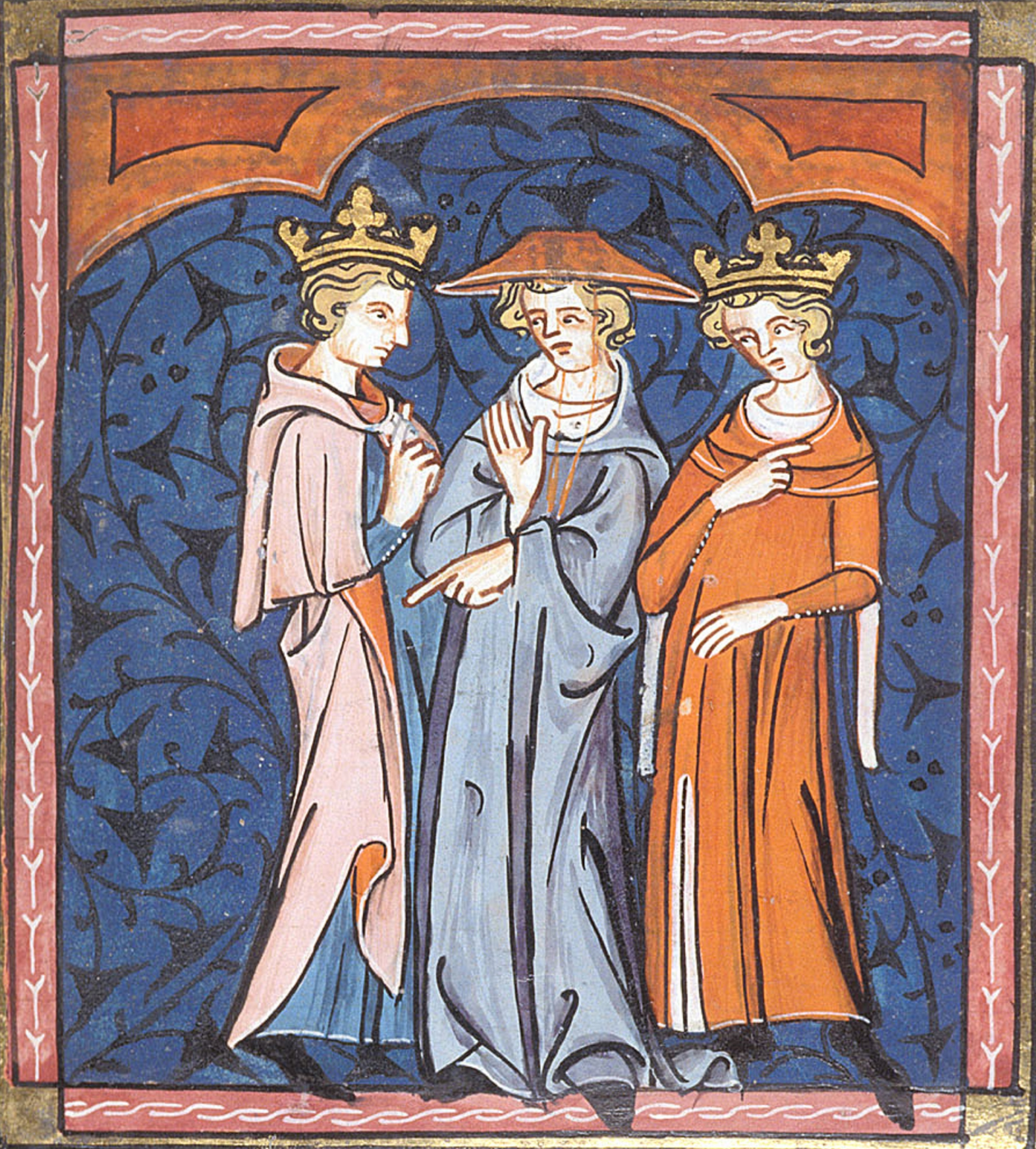
Peter (centre) mediating between Philip Augustus and Richard the Lionheart. From a 14th-century illuminated manuscript of the Grandes chroniques de France.

Peter of Capua (Italian: Pietro Capuano; Latin: Petrus Capuanus; (Note: His name also appears in Latin as Petrus de Capua, Petrus Capuensis, Petrus de Cappuis or Petrus de Chapes.) died 30 August 1214) was an Italian scholastic theologian and prelate. He served as cardinal-deacon of Santa Maria in Via Lata from 1193 until 1201 and cardinal-priest of San Marcello al Corso from 1201 until his death. He often worked as a papal legate. He wrote several theological works and was a patron of his hometown of Amalfi.

He is sometimes called "Peter of Capua the Elder" to distinguish him from his nephew, Peter of Capua the Younger (died 1236), who was also educated in Paris and taught there, and later became a cardinal.

== Family ==
Peter belonged to an illustrious family of Lombard descent from Amalfi in the kingdom of Sicily. His earliest known ancestor was Lando de Prata, a relative of the last independent duke of Amalfi, Marinus Sebastus (r. 1097–1100). His father, Landulf (fl. 1161–1176, dead by 1201), was a son of Manso and great-grandson of Lando. His mother's name is unknown, but she belonged to the Vulcano family of Sorrento, whom Peter referred to in 1208 as his "cousins". Peter was one of four brothers. The others were Maurus, John and Manso. The family owned properties in Amalfi, Atrani, Agerola, Maiori and Capri, and had rights over the church of San Sebastiano on the hills above Amalfi.

== Education and teaching career ==
Peter took minor orders around 1170 and entered the cathedral of Amalfi. He was sent to be educated at the University of Bologna and then the University of Paris. At Paris in the 1180s, he studied theology and philosophy. There he attached himself to the circle around Peter Lombard and befriended Peter of Poitiers, Praepositinus of Cremona, Robert Curzon, Stephen Langton and the future Pope Innocent III. He taught for a time in Paris, and his first writings, Modus tractandi and Summae, date from this period.

Peter joined the Roman curia under Pope Clement III (r. 1187–1191). His first job in Rome was teaching theology and law. He wrote the encyclopedia Alphabetum de arte sermocinandi during this period. All of his works are written in a conservative scholastic style. All have at some point been misattributed to his nephew, but their attribution to Peter the elder is secure.

== Cardinal ==
Peter had a reputation as a brilliant scholar and preacher when Celestine III named him cardinal-deacon of Santa Maria in Via Lata in the consistory of 20 February 1193. He subscribed a papal bull with this titulus on 5 March. In October 1193, Peter attended the canonization of John Gualbert. Through his subscriptions to papal bulls, he can be traced at the papal court until 1 July 1195.

=== Legation in Apulia and Calabria ===
In July 1195, Peter briefly governed Benevento as papal rector. That same month, he was named papal legate in Apulia and Calabria and legate general for the whole kingdom of Sicily. His charge was to ensure that the Emperor Henry VI, the new king of Sicily, adhered to the agreement with the church made by his predecessor, Tancred. Peter's legation was strongly opposed by the Empress Constance, who had a hereditary right to Sicily. Peter concluded his mission in the spring of 1196.

During his southern Italian legation, Peter did not travel far, remaining in the north of Apulia and around Benevento. He judged a dispute between canons and bishop of Vieste in favour of the bishop; answered a question from the bishop of Melfi concerning marriage law; and, at Benevento in March 1196, struck a compromise between the bishop of Dragonara and the monastery of Santa Maria di Gualdo Mazzocca in their dispute over the church of San Matteo di Sculcola.

=== Legation in Bohemia and Poland ===
In the second half of 1196, Celestine dispatched him as legate to Bohemia and Poland to reform their churches. He acted with legatine powers on his journey through Italy and Germany, although they were not within his assigned area. He made a solemn entry into Prague on 12 March 1197, and remained in the city at least through May. He alienated the secular clergy by his demand that all those who had received an uncanonical ordination be re-ordained canonically. An attempt was even made on his life. His demands on the monastic clergy were no less rigorous. He deposed two abbots. He held a synod in Prague that reformed the liturgy and imposed clerical celibacy. He confirmed with his seal and signature the privilege issued by Bishop Jindřich to the monastery of Teplá founded by Count Hroznata. He moved on to Poland in the summer. There he introduced clerical celibacy. He also sought to normalize church marriages. He confirmed the act of Bishop Żyrosław II of Wrocław giving the monastery of Saint Vincent to the Premonstratensians.

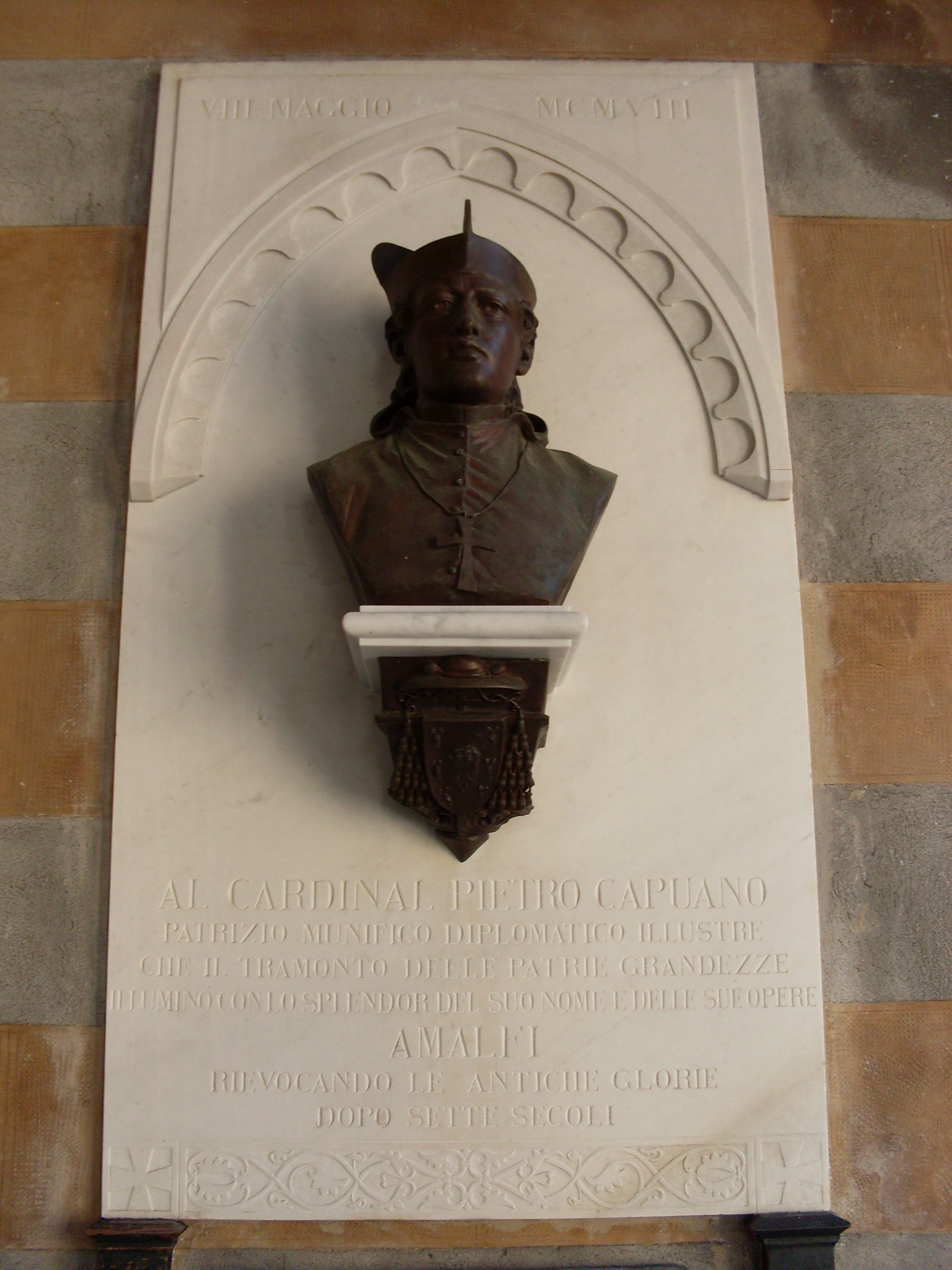
There is a bust of Peter in the cathedral of Amalfi

While returning to Rome late in 1197, Peter was attacked and robbed by men of Marquis Guglielmo Pallavicino and Piacenza. When the consuls of Piacenza refused to compensate him, Pope Innocent III, who had succeeded Celestine, threatened the city with ecclesiastical penalties. Peter arrived in Rome in early 1198 and was named an auditor. In August, he was with the pope at Rieti to witness the exaltation of the relics of Saint Eleutherius. Through his subscriptions to papal bulls, he can be traced at the papal court between 13 March 1198 and 11 November 1200. He took part in the 1198 papal election.

=== Legation in France and Burgundy ===
Innocent III sent Peter as legate to France and Burgundy in late 1198. His primary mission was to preach the Fourth Crusade, but preparatory to that, he was to arrange a peace or at least a five-year truce between the warring kings Philip II of France and Richard I of England. Innocent had announced Peter's dual mission in a letter of 13 August 1198.

Peter arrived in Paris in December 1198. According to the Histoire de Guillaume le Maréchal, the English found Peter's appearance and obsequious style of diplomacy repellent. During a meeting with Richard and William Marshal, Peter convinced Richard to agree to a conditional five-year truce, but when he persisted in asking that Richard also release Philip of Dreux, bishop of Beauvais, whom the king intensely hated, Richard lost his temper and threatened to castrate the legate. Nonetheless, a five-year truce was agreed on 13 January 1199. Bishop Philip and Bishop-elect Hugh of Cambrai were released from prison. Richard soon accused Philip of building a castle in violation of the truce, and Peter ordered the French king to demolish it. The legate helped draft a new treaty, but it was not ratified before Richard's sudden death in April. (Note: "With the legate's help, a treaty on these lines was drafted. Philip's son, Louis, would marry one of Richard's nieces, a daughter of the king of Castile, and Richard would grant them Gisors and 20,000 marks as a dowry. As well as giving up his rights in Tours, Philip would also agree to abandon his ally Philip of Swabia and instead help Richard's nephew, Otto of Brunswick, in his fight to win undisputed possession of the German crown.") He did succeed in having the truce renewed by Richard's successor, John, in October 1199, albeit only for three months.

After Richard's death, Peter visited Fontevraud Abbey to confirm a donation made by Richard's mother, Eleanor of Aquitaine. He then passed through Normandy, dealing with various disputes between York and Canterbury and the disputed election to Cambrai. He sought to convince Philip II to repudiate his second wife, Agnes, and return to his first, Ingeborg. On 6 December 1199, he held a synod in Dijon. The assembled bishops promised one thirtieth of their revenues for the crusade and threatened put France under the interdict if Philip did not return to his lawful wife. A few days later, Peter held a second synod in Vienne. The interdict against France was published on 13 January 1200. Peter was replaced that year as legate by Cardinal Ottaviano of Ostia.

Peter returned to Rome, and in March 1201, he was promoted to cardinal-priest of San Marcello. He signed his first papal bull as such on 23 November 1201. As an auditor, he heard the case of the divorce between King Ottokar I of Bohemia and Adelaide of Meissen. In 1202, he was proposed as a candidate for the archdiocese of Amalfi, but Innocent III had other plans.

=== Legate to the Fourth Crusade and the Holy Land ===
In April 1202, Innocent III named Peter and Soffredo of Pisa as legates in charge of the crusade. Peter was sent to Venice, where the crusaders were gathering, in order to prevent the Venetians from using the army to attack Zara. When he arrived in Venice in July, however, the Republic of Venice did not accept that his legatine authority extended to them. Peter sought to keep the crusader army together even at the cost of an attack on Zara. He denied the requests of Abbot Martin of Pairis and Bishop Conrad of Halberstadt to be absolved of their vows. He even gave Martin spiritual charge of all German crusaders and told Conrad that the pope himself would overlook wrongdoing by the crusaders to keep the expedition going. In September, Peter returned to Rome with the proposed agreement between the crusaders and Alexios Angelos, whereby the latter would support the crusade with money and troops in return for its help putting him on the Byzantine throne. As a result, Peter was away when the army sacked Zara and Innocent placed it under excommunication.

Peter returned to the army after the fall of Zara in November 1202 in order to lift the excommunication. By the spring of 1203, he had received the requisite oaths of purification, absolved the crusaders and returned to Rome. He did not remain with the army so as not to take part in an attack on Constantinople. With a small group that included Bishop Sicard of Cremona and Abbot Martin of Pairis, he travelled to the Holy Land by ship from Siponto to Acre. During a stopover in Cyprus, he introduced several ecclesiastical reforms. He landed in Acre on 25 April 1203 or perhaps a few weeks later.

In Acre, following on the work of Soffredo, Peter used his legatine authority to mediate peace between the feuding Pisan and Genoese communities. He also arranged for the Maronite bishops to formally submit to papal authority. In March 1204, he held a synod in Antioch, which placed Armenian Cilicia under interdict. He then went to Sis in Cilicia to negotiate a settlement to the Antiochene succession crisis and confer the pallium on the patriarch of Sis and confirm the Armenians' obedience to Rome. King Leo I of Armenia and the Patriarch John VI accused Peter of being a tool of the Templars and Hospitallers. Less successful in Cilicia than Soffredo had been, Peter rejoined his fellow legate in Acre in July 1204.

=== Constantinople ===
Although Peter did not take part in the sack of Constantinople by a faction of crusaders and Venetians in 1204, Peter sent an envoy (Note: This was a fellow Amalfitan named Marino Quatrario, treasurer of Nicosia.) to Constantinople to absolve the Venetians of their excommunication in the summer of 1204. He and Soffredo were invited by the new emperor, Baldwin I, to help organise the church in the conquered territories. After confirming a six-year truce with the Ayyubid Egypt, the legates set out for Constantinople in October 1204. Innocent III later reprimanded them because they had no permission, and their departure convinced many other crusaders who had gone to the Holy Land to leave as well, denuding its defences.

In Constantinople, Peter was solemnly welcomed in the Hagia Sophia. He failed in negotiations to bring the Greek Orthodox clergy to the Roman obedience. In May 1205, Innocent appointed a legate for the Empire of Constantinople, Benedict, and ordered Peter to return to the Holy Land. Peter, however, remained in Constantinople, even offering to absolve those crusaders of their oath to go to the Holy Land who agreed to remain in the empire for one more year in its defence. This was the last straw for Innocent III. Peter had exceeded his instructions and the pope reprimanded him harshly.

Following the death of Baldwin I (April 1205), Peter took a leading role in opposing Venetian dominance in the empire. He cooperated with Benedict after his arrival. He was back in the Holy Land by August 1206, still as legate alongside Patriarch Albert of Jerusalem. During his brief second stay, he excommunicated and suspended Patriarch Peter of Antioch for interfering with his provision of Antiochen benefices. He returned to Europe later that year, arriving in Gaeta with a small fleet and many returning crusaders.

=== Later life ===
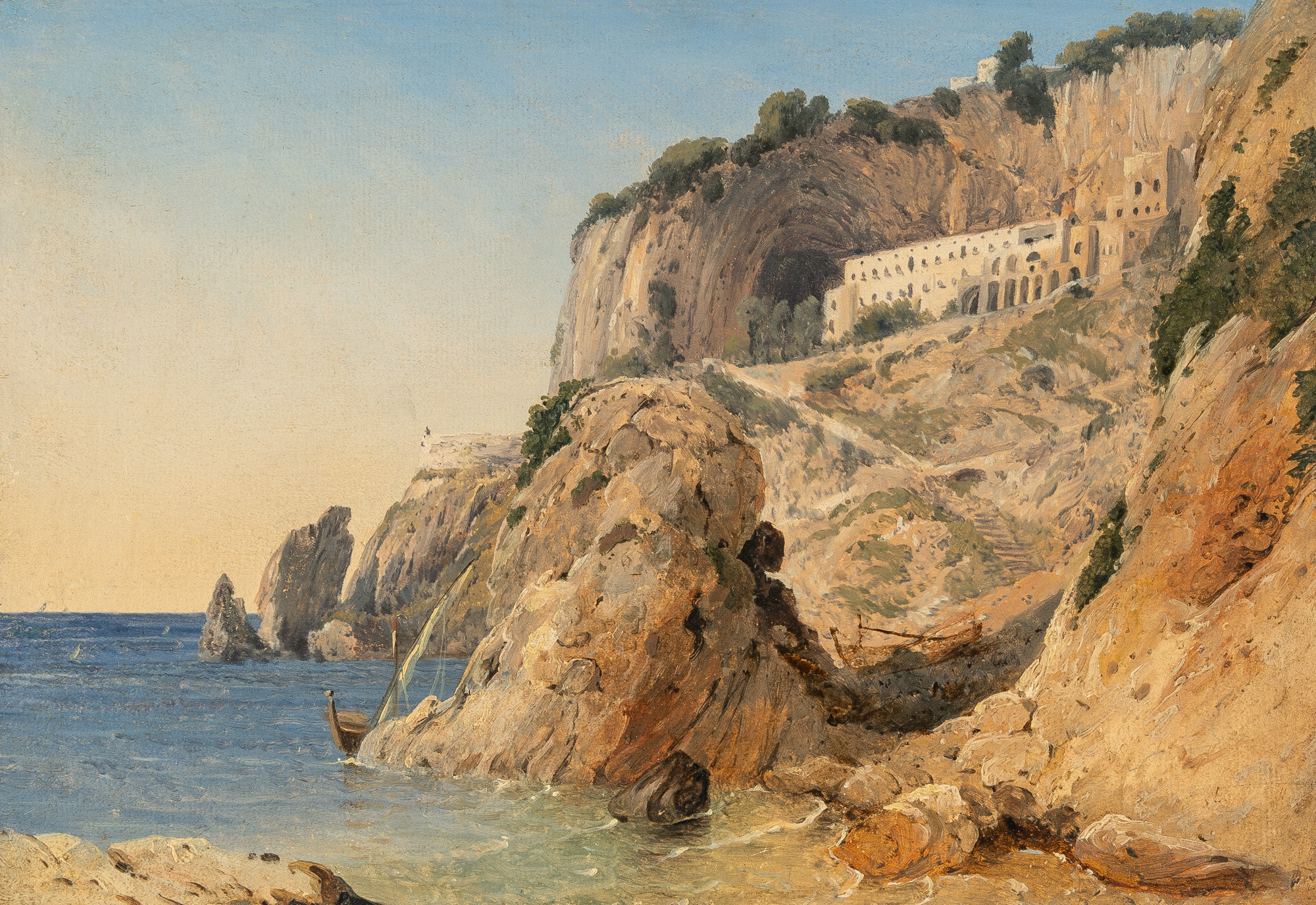
19th-century painting by William Linton of the monastery of San Pietro di Canonica, founded by Peter of Capua

In Constantinople, Peter acquired many relics, including the purported body of Saint Andrew. He sent some of his loot to the cathedrals of Capua, Gaeta, Langres, Naples, Paris and Sorrento. Saint Andrew, he brought to Amalfi, where the body was received in a solemn procession on 8 May 1208 in the presence of Peter and Archbishop Matteo Costantini. It was re-buried in the cathedral crypt. In 1208, he divided the income from pilgrims coming to see Saint Andrew between the cathedral and a hospital he founded for the poor, Santa Maria della Misericordia. In October 1208, he endowed a "school of liberal arts" for the youth of Amalfi and Atrani. He and his heirs were to have the right to appoint the headmaster (magister scholae). Peter also founded a hospital for the poor in Amalfi. He also provided funds for the expansion of its port.

Early in 1211, Peter was elected patriarch of Constantinople, but the pope blocked it. In 1212, he investigated the archbishop-elect of Palermo, Parisius, and recommended his deposition. In 1212, he purchased the church of San Pietro di Tozzolo in Amalfi and converted it into the monastery of San Pietro di Canonica for the Canons Regular of the Lateran. He endowed it with property in Eboli and with the chapel of San Pietro al Corto, given to him by King Frederick of Sicily. In March, Frederick met him in Rome and promised to give the church a share of the income of the bailiffate of Tropea.

He stayed in Amalfi in 1212–1213. In 1213, he entrusted Santa Maria della Misericordia to the Crociferi. Later in the year, he sought to convert San Pietro di Canonica into a Cistercian monastery, using monks from the monastery of Fossanova. Although Abbot Peter objected, Innocent III's intervention made it happen. In March 1214, San Pietro became a Cistercian priory under Fossanova.

Peter witnessed his last papal bull on 21 April 1214. He died in Viterbo, where the Roman curia was staying, on 30 August 1214 and was buried in the church of Santa Maria in Ara Coeli. His death is recorded in the necrologies of the cathedral of Paris, the cathedral of Sens and the monastery of Fossanova.

A verse biography of Peter was written by Durand of Huesca.

== Works ==
- Summae (or Summa in libros sententiarum magistri Petri Lombardi), dedicated to Archbishop Walter Ophamil of Palermo (died 1190), a summa based on the Sentences of Peter Lombard and closely related to the works of Peter of Poitiers and Praepositinus. The Summae was widely disseminated in France, Italy and southern Germany in the 13th century, making Peter a widely read author. In it, he outlines his modus tractandi quaestiones theologicas ('way of treating theological questions'), which likens theology to a building. The foundation is auctoritates (authorities), the walls are quaestiones (questions, arguments) and the roof is solutions and reason (tectum solutionum et rationum).
- Alphabetum in artem sermocinandi, originally written probably towards 1190 and dedicated to the Roman clergy, an alphabetical "moral–exegetic" encyclopedia for preachers, especially for aiding them in constructing allegories. It attained its final form after 1193. Twenty manuscripts of the Alphabetum are known from the 13th century.
- Commentaria in ius pontificium, a lost commentary about papal law.
