= Rolandino of Padua =

Rolandino of Padova (1200–1276) was an Italian medieval jurist and writer.

He studied at the University of Bologna, where he was a pupil of Boncompagno da Signa. Later he was a professor of grammar and rhetoric at the University of Padua and a notary for the city's commune.

A supporter of the communal freedom, he wrote the Cronica in factis et circa facta Marchie Trivixane ("Chronicle of the Facts of the March of Treviso"), in which he details the Paduan struggle against Ezzelino III da Romano. He is also a major source for the War of the Castle of Love between Padua and Venice in 1215. His Cronica was used as a source by the 14th-century Paduan historian Guglielmo Cortusi.

== Sources ==
- "Rolandino da Padova". Enciclopedia Italiana.
