= Gian Giacomo Caroldo =

Gian Giacomo Caroldo (c. 1480 – 3 June 1538/9) was a Venetian official, diplomat and historian.

Caroldo's background is completely unknown. Later Venetian genealogists recorded that the Caroldi came to Venice from Milan in 1323. Gian Giacomo was born in Venice around 1480. Of his family and private life very little is known. He had a brother, Costantino, who also worked in the chancery. He took care of his sister Maria, widow of a cloth merchant, and in 1515 asked the Senate for support for her children.

Caroldo trained as a notary and took a job in the chancery in 1496. In a document he wrote on 15 September 1511, he records how he had been part of diplomatic missions to England, Spain, the Ottoman Empire and various states in Italy. He was the secretary of Ambassador Andrea Gritti during the negotiations that ended the Ottoman–Venetian War of 1499–1503. A report he wrote on this mission, dated 30 September 1503, was included by Marino Sanudo the Younger in his Diarii.

Caroldo was kept busy during the War of the League of Cambrai (1508–1516). Pietro Bembo credits him with first alerting the Venetian government to the anti-Venetian league when he was ducal secretary in Milan in 1508. Following the Venetian defeat by the League at the Battle of Agnadello in 1509, the Senate sent him to Bologna to negotiate with Cardinal Francesco Alidosi for the pope's withdrawal from the League. In June 1509, Caroldo was arrested by Pope Julius II. He spent the next year in prison. Between August 1511 and January 1513, he was the Venetian representative in the Duchy of Milan. In 1517, he was sent to France. He returned to Milan in the company of the French governor, the Viscount of Lautrec, in June 1517. He twice asked to be relieved from his post 1518, but the Council of Ten preferred on both occasions to increase his compensation instead. He remained at Milan until May 1520. He never held another diplomatic post, although he occasionally met with foreign ambassadors in Venice.

Between 1520 and 1532, Caroldo wrote his Historia Veneta (Venetian History) in vernacular Venetian. It is a history of Venice from its foundation down to 1382. For the years down to 1280, Caroldo relies mainly on Andrea Dandolo's Latin Chronica per extensum descripta. For the rest of the Historia, he used the Venetian archives. This is the most valuable part of the work. Caroldo made at least two redactions of the Historia, and incomplete autograph manuscripts survive of each. There is also a third redaction.

Caroldo died on 3 June 1538 or 1539.

== Bibliography ==
- Carile, Antonio (1977). "Caroldo, Gian Giacomo". Dizionario Biografico degli Italiani (in Italian). Vol. 20: Carducci–Carusi. Rome: Istituto dell'Enciclopedia Italiana. ISBN 978-88-12-00032-6.
- Kohl, Benjamin G. (2016). "Caroldo, Gian Giacomo". In Graeme Dunphy; Cristian Bratu (eds.). Encyclopedia of the Medieval Chronicle. Brill Online. doi:10.1163/2213-2139_emc_SIM_00416.
- McCormick, Michael (1991). "Caroldo, Gian Giacomo". In Kazhdan, Alexander (ed.). The Oxford Dictionary of Byzantium. Oxford and New York: Oxford University Press. p. 382. ISBN 0-19-504652-8.
