= Princess Mafalda =

Princess Mafalda may refer to:

- Mafalda of Portugal (born 1153) (1153–1162)
- Mafalda of Castile (1191–1204)
- Mafalda of Portugal (1195–1256)
- Princess Mafalda of Savoy (1902–1944)
- Mafalda von Hessen (born 1965), also known as Princess Mafalda of Hesse
- Ona Mafalda (born 1994), also known as Princess Mafalda of Bulgaria
