= Henry I of Castile =

King of Castile and Toledo from 1214 to 1217

Henry I
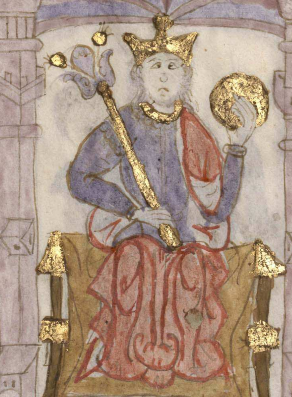
- Portrait in the Semblanzas de reyes

King of Castile and Toledo
- Reign: 5 October 1214 – 6 June 1217
- Predecessor: Alfonso VIII
- Successor: Berengaria
- Born: 14 April 1204; Valladolid, Castile
- Died: 6 June 1217 (aged 13); Palencia, Castile
- Burial: Las Huelgas, Burgos
- Spouse: Mafalda of Portugal (m. 1215; ann. 1216)
- House: Castilian House of Ivrea
- Father: Alfonso VIII of Castile
- Mother: Eleanor of England

Henry I (Spanish: Enrique; 14 April 1204 – 6 June 1217) was the king of Castile from 1214 until 1217. Throughout his short reign, the boy king was a puppet monarch torn between his sister and heir, Queen Berengaria, and guardian, Count Álvaro Núñez de Lara.

Henry was the only surviving son of Alfonso VIII of Castile and Eleanor of England. He succeeded to the throne upon Alfonso's death on 5 October 1214. Because Henry was only ten at the time and his mother died within weeks, his older sister Berengaria took up rule as regent in his name. Discontented nobility forced her to give up rule and custody of Henry to Álvaro in early 1215. In an attempt to solidify his rule by procuring alliances with other Iberian rulers, Álvaro arranged for Henry to marry Mafalda of Portugal, but Berengaria intervened to have the marriage annulled; Álvaro then attempted to betroth Henry to Sancha of León in 1216, but the Leónese rejected the offer.

When the hostilities between Berengaria and Álvaro erupted into an open war in April 1217, Álvaro took Henry with him on military campaigns; the young king's presence forced Berengaria and her supporters to yield. Henry was killed by a tile dislodged by one of his playmates soon after, and Berengaria succeeded to the throne.

== Early years ==
Henry was born in Valladolid at dawn on 14 April 1204. He was the youngest of the ten or twelve children of King Alfonso VIII and Queen Eleanor of Castile, and was named after his maternal grandfather, King Henry II of England. His mother was already at an advanced age of 44. At birth, Henry was second in line to the throne of Castile; the heir apparent was his only surviving brother, Ferdinand. That same year, the eldest of his sisters, Queen Berengaria of León, returned to their parents' court with her children after the annulment of her marriage to King Alfonso IX of León. Upon Ferdinand's death in 1211, Henry became heir apparent to the throne.

Realizing that he would likely die while Henry was still a child, King Alfonso intended to entrust the care for his family and the kingdom to his faithful vassal Diego López II de Haro, but Diego died in September 1214. Shattered by this loss, the ailing Alfonso decreed that the regency should belong to his wife, Eleanor. Henry—who followed his parents, sisters, and nephews on their travels across the Kingdom of Castile—was present at the deathbed of his father in the village of Gutierre-Muñoz on 5 October 1214.

Genealogy of the royal houses of Castile and León

Alfonso VII of León and Castile	Berengaria of Barcelona
Ferdinand II of León	Sancho III of Castile	Blanche of Navarre	Henry II of England	Eleanor of Aquitaine
Alfonso VIII of Castile	Eleanor of England
Theresa of Portugal	Alfonso IX of León	Berengaria of Castile	Urraca of Castile	Blanche of Castile	Ferdinand of Castile	Eleanor of Castile	Henry I of Castile
Sancha of León	Ferdinand III of Castile and León

== Reign ==
=== Rule of queens ===
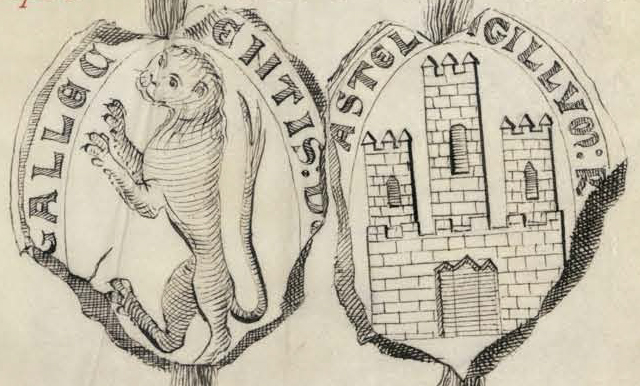
Seal of Queen Berengaria, Henry's eldest sister and heir. She ruled in his name after the death of their mother.

Queen Eleanor was already ill when King Alfonso, died; she followed him on 31 October 1214, having willed the regency and the custody of their son Henry to their eldest daughter, Berengaria. The young Henry became king with Berengaria ruling in his name. Her rule was meant to last until Henry reached the age of majority of 15 in 1219. Henry's accession was celebrated with a Te Deum sung at the Abbey of Santa María la Real de Las Huelgas.

Berengaria appointed García Lorenzo, a knight from Palencia, to serve as Henry's tutor. Her rule was challenged by the House of Lara, who felt excluded from power in favor of the archbishop of Toledo, Rodrigo Jiménez de Rada, and the bishop of Palencia, Tello Téllez de Meneses. She called a general council at Burgos, at which it was decided that Count Álvaro Núñez de Lara should rule the kingdom in Henry's name and have custody of him. Berengaria acquiesced to ceding the custody of Henry and the day-to-day government to Álvaro while retaining the office of regent. She did so under several conditions, including not taking or giving away land without her approval, and Álvaro swore an oath to respect them. In April 1215, Henry was given over to Álvaro.

=== Rule of Count Álvaro ===
==== Marriage ploys ====
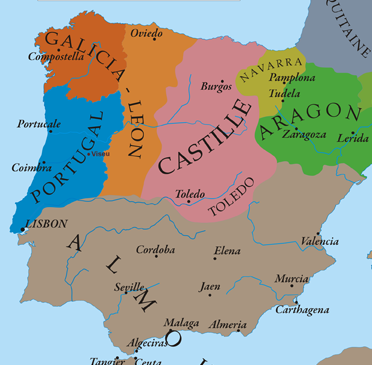
Henry's guardian tried to ally with Portugal and León by arranging marriages for Henry, but both matches failed.

Soon after the transfer of custody, Álvaro had Henry declare war on Lope Díaz de Haro and Rodrigo Díaz de los Cameros. Berengaria was enraged because she considered the act to be a contravention of Álvaro's oath to her. To counteract the threat to his rule posed by Berengaria and her former husband, King Alfonso IX of León, Álvaro arranged for Henry to marry Mafalda, sister of King Alfonso II of Portugal. The marriage negotiations were concluded in August 1215, and Álvaro escorted Mafalda to Castile. Archbishop Rodrigo writes that 11-year-old Henry was too young to consummate his marriage with 21-year-old Mafalda, while the Chronicle of Twenty Kings relates that, "although the king was a child and she, a very well-built woman, the king fulfilled all his marital obligations".

According to the Chronicle of Twenty Kings, Álvaro requested by letter that Berengaria surrender to the Crown the properties given to her by her parents; when Henry found out about this, he secretly sent word to his sister that this request was not his wish and expressed a wish to return to her. Archbishop Rodrigo, on the other hand, narrates that Álvaro took Henry to curia regis in Valladolid in April 1216 and confronted Berengaria in person.

Berengaria denounced Henry's marriage with Mafalda and wrote to Pope Innocent III, complaining that it was illegal because the couple were too closely related (Note: Henry and Mafalda were first cousins once removed: her grandparents Count Ramon Berenguer III of Barcelona and Countess Douce I of Provence were Henry's great-grandparents.) and that Álvaro had violated his oath not to make such important decisions without consulting her. Innocent tasked the bishop of Burgos, Mauricio, and the bishop of Palencia with effecting the annulment of the marriage. When they failed, Innocent ordered the bishop of Tarazona, García Frontin I, and the choirmaster of Lleida to excommunicate Henry and Mafalda. At that point the couple separated and the sanction was lifted. The marriage had been dissolved by the time Innocent died on 16 July 1216.

The alliance with Portugal having failed, Álvaro decided to approach King Alfonso of León. He left Burgos with Henry in July 1216 and headed towards the Leónese border. On 12 August, Henry and Alfonso met in Toro and concluded a peace treaty. Álvaro then contacted Alfonso's half-brother and confidant Sancho, proposing that Henry marry Alfonso's eldest daughter, Sancha, born to Alfonso's first wife, Mafalda's sister Theresa. The idea was to disinherit Alfonso and Berengaria's son Ferdinand and have Henry succeed Alfonso on the throne of León by virtue of marriage to Alfonso's eldest daughter. Henry was too closely related to Sancha as well, their fathers having been first cousins, and the marriage ploy was rejected by the court of León.

==== Intrigues and open war ====
In October 1216, Berengaria sent a spy to Maqueda, where Henry was staying with Álvaro. The spy was caught with a letter from Berengaria ordering that Henry be given a drink laced with poison, and was executed. Archbishop Rodrigo and the bishop of Osma, Juan de Soria, accuse Álvaro of framing Berengaria with the aim of tarnishing her reputation and ruining her relationship with Henry. (Note: Historians disagree on whether the letter was certainly Álvaro's fabrication or possibly genuine and evidence of a plot by Berengaria to eliminate Henry.) After this incident, the nobleman Rodrigo González de Valverde, who had Henry's trust, defected to Berengaria. She and the nobles rallied around her and commissioned him to penetrate Álvaro's stronghold at Huete and take control of Henry, but he was discovered and imprisoned by Álvaro.

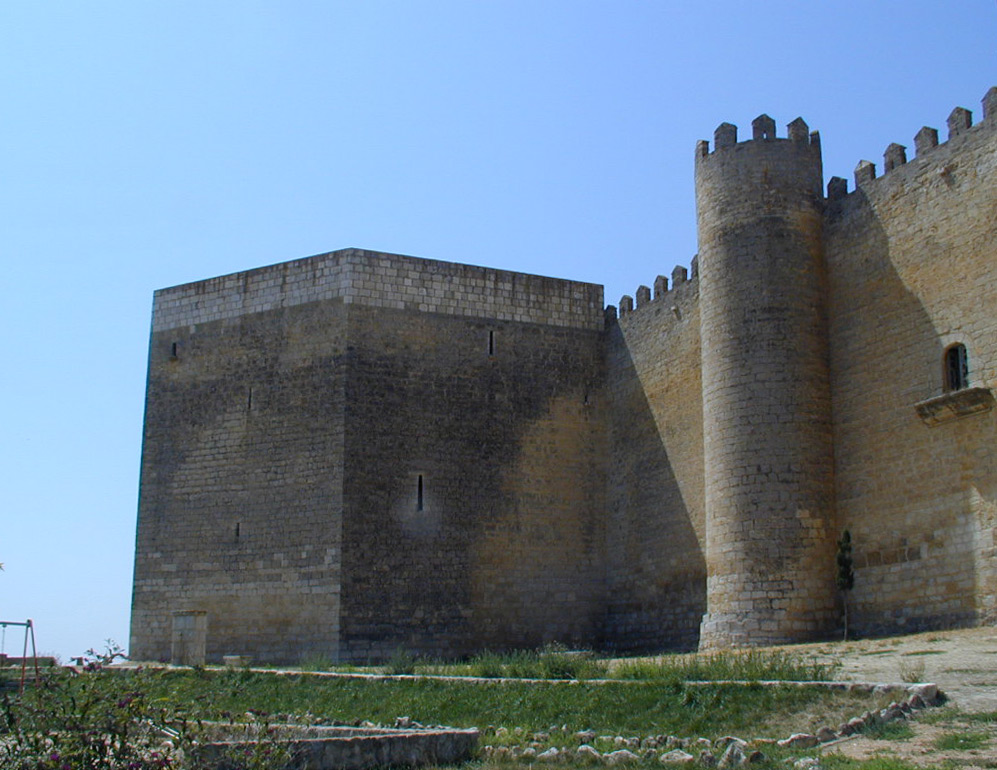
The castle of Montealegre was surrendered to Count Álvaro's forces at King Henry's demand.

Álvaro took Henry to Valladolid in March 1217, and in April an open war ensued between the factions of Álvaro and Berengaria. Álvaro besieged the castle of Bishop Tello's brother Suero in Montealegre de Campos. Tello's other brother, Alfonso, quickly arrived with Gonzalo Rodríguez Girón and his brothers to the siege; despite having a stronger force, they declined to assist the besieged out of respect for King Henry, who was with the besieging army. When Henry demanded the castle from Suero, Suero gave it up without resistance. Álvaro then left the castle with Henry and laid siege to Villalba de los Alcores, defended by Alfonso Téllez; after abandoning that siege, they went to Palencia. Berengaria and her followers decided to sue for peace because attacking Álvaro meant attacking Henry, who was their king. Álvaro's power depended on having Henry in his custody, and the young king reigned as a puppet monarch.

== Death and aftermath ==
On 26 May 1217, Henry was playing with his peers at the home of Bishop Tello in Palencia when one of the boys—identified as Iñigo de Mendoza in the General Chronicle of Spain of 1344—dislodged a tile from the tower, hitting Henry in the head. Álvaro summoned skilled physicians, who performed trepanation to relieve intracerebral hemorrhaging. Henry survived this excruciating surgery. Despite efforts to save him, he died on 6 June.

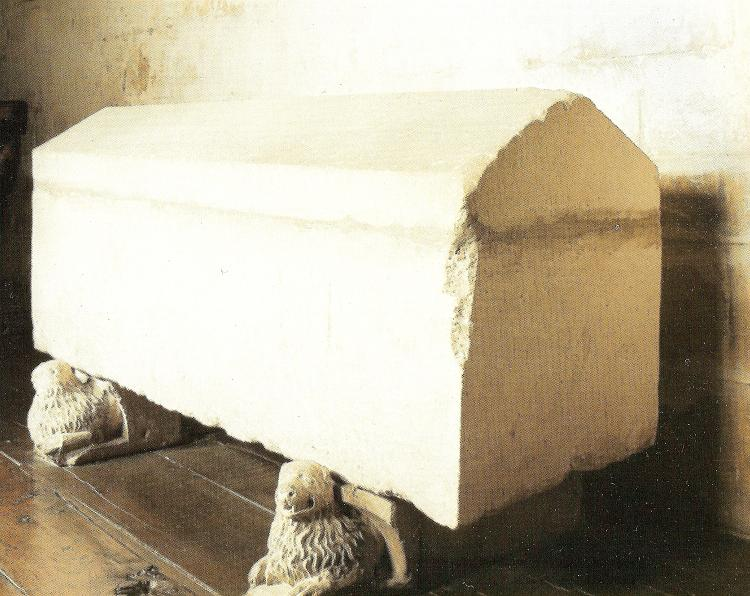
Queen Berengaria had her brother buried at Las Huelgas.

Henry's death was catastrophic for Álvaro, who tried to keep it secret from Berengaria. He hid Henry's body in a tower of the castle of Tariego de Cerrato and ordered all witnesses to stay silent. Nevertheless, news reached Berengaria within only four or five hours. (Note: Iñigo de Mendoza, who witnessed Henry's acts in early 1217, was related to the Haros, who were the Laras' archenemies. Henry's skull was studied in the 1940s. Modern historians disagree on the probability of Berengaria's involvement in Henry's death, describing the question as either "so irrational that it verges on the absurd" or "worth asking" considering her "suspiciously good luck, the improbability of the boy's death, and the context of a civil war which had already begun to escalate". Bishop Tello has also come under suspicion.) After securing the succession for herself and her son Ferdinand III, Berengaria sent Bishops Tello and Mauricio to collect Henry's corpse from Tariego and had it interred at Las Huelgas, next to her and Henry's parents and siblings. Henry's remains were placed in a 165 cm long coffin, his injured head covered with a silk Lara bonnet bearing a Kufic inscription, "Our consolation is in the Lord".

== Notes ==
Henry I of Castile Castilian House of Ivrea Cadet branch of the House of Ivrea Born: 14 April 1204 Died: 6 June 1217
Regnal titles
Preceded by Alfonso VIII	King of Castile; 1214–1217	Succeeded by Berengaria
