= Mafalda (disambiguation) =

Mafalda is an Argentine comic strip.

Mafalda may also refer to:

== People ==
=== People with the mononym ===
- Ona Mafalda (born 1994), Spanish singer-songwriter and member of the Bulgarian royal family
- Mafalda of Portugal (c. 1195 – 1256), Portuguese infanta
- Matilda of Savoy, Queen of Portugal (1125–1158), or Mafalda, wife of King Afonso I of Portugal
- Princess Mafalda of Savoy (1902–1944), wife of Prince Philipp of Hesse
- Mafalda of Portugal (born 1153), Portuguese infanta
- Maud of Apulia (c. 1060 – c. 1112), or Mafalda
- Mafalda of Castile (1191–1204), an infanta of Castile

=== People with the given name ===
- Mafalda Arnauth (born 1974), Portuguese singer
- Mafalda Favero (1905–1981), Italian opera singer
- Mafalda Luís de Castro (born 1989), Portuguese actress
- Mafalda Pereira (born 1976), Portuguese skier
- Mafalda Pinto (born 1983), Portuguese actress and model
- Mafalda Piovano (fl. 1952–1955), Argentine politician
- Mafalda Salvatini (1886–1971), Italian opera singer
- Mafalda Veiga (born 1965), Portuguese singer-songwriter
- Mafalda von Hessen (born 1965), Princess Mafalda of Hesse, German aristocrat and fashion designer
- Princess Mafalda Mafalda Arrivabene-Valenti-Gonzaga (born 1969), daughter of Amedeo, 5th Duke of Aosta

=== People with the surname ===
- Eloísa Mafalda (1924–2018), Brazilian actress

== Other uses ==
- Mafalda, Molise, a town in Italy
- Mafalda Hopkirk, a minor character in the Harry Potter universe
- SS Principessa Mafalda, an Italian ocean liner that sank in a disaster in 1927
- Mafaldine, or Mafalda, a kind of pasta

== See also ==
- Matilda (given name)
