= Arnaut de Tintinhac =

Arnaut in chansonnier E

Arnaut de Tintinhac or Tintignac was a 12th-century Gascon nobleman and troubadour from Naves, near Tulle. He was the lord of Tintinhac, probably a feudatory of the viscount of Turrenne, and very proud of his heritage, as indicated when he refers to himself anonymously as sel de Tintinhac: "he of Tintinhac".

Four of his poems have survived, with one—Bel m'es quan l'erba reverdis—being ascribed in one manuscript to Raimon Vidal. In his expressions he is reminiscent of Marcabru and Bernart Marti and in his aggressive attitude towards encouraging courtly love he also resembles the early troubadours. Like other early Gascon troubadours, such as Peire de Valeira, he employed nature metaphors, as at the beginning of this song:

Molt dezis l'aura doussana lanquan vei los albros floritz et aug d'auzels grans e petitz lur chans per vergiers e per plais; e, qui d'amor ha enveja, si.n aquel temps no se pleja, no vueill son lonc respeit mi do.	I much desire the sweet aura when I see the trees in flower and I hear the birds great and small, their songs, by the orchards and the fences; and, who for love has yearned, if this time I do not submit to it, I do not wish it to concede me respite.

The vida of Peire de Valeira seems to confuse its intended subject with Arnaut (at least at some points). It goes like this:

Peire de Valeira was from Gascony, from the land of Lord Arnaut Guillem de Marsan. He was a minstrel at the very same time in which Marcabru lived, and he composed poems such as were made at the time, of slight worth, about leaves and flowers and songs and birds. .

== Sources ==
- Egan, Margarita, ed. and trans. The Vidas of the Troubadours. New York: Garland, 1984. ISBN 0-8240-9437-9.
- Riquer, Martín de. Los trovadores: historia literaria y textos. 3 vol. Barcelona: Planeta, 1975.
