= Arnaut Guilhem de Marsan =

Arnaut Guilhem (or Guillem) de Marsan (fl. 1160–1180) was a Landais nobleman and troubadour. He was descended from a cadet branch of the viscounts of Marsan and was himself lord of Roquefort and Montgaillard and co-lord of Marsan.

Arnaut was a member of the 1170 escort of Eleanor, daughter of Henry II of England, from Bordeaux to the Spanish border for her marriage to Alfonso VIII of Castile. He is attested in a charter of Eleanor of Aquitaine.

Arnaut Guilhem was also an Occitan lyric poet who composed one of the earliest ensenhamens or didactic poems: the Ensenhamen del cavalier (teaching of the cavalier). The medievalist Mark Johnston notes that his work is similar to that of another 12th-century troubadour poet, Garin lo Brun.

According to an Occitan vida, the troubadour Peire de Valeira was from Arnaut Guilhem's lands. Arnaut Guilhem was the ancestor of three branches of the house of Marsan through his three sons: the co-lords of Marsans and lords of Roquefort and Montgaillard; the lords of Cauna; and the lords of Tardets.

== Sources ==
- Egan, Margarita, ed. and trans. The Vidas of the Troubadours. New York: Garland, 1984. ISBN 0-8240-9437-9.
- Johnston, Mark. "Gender as Conduct in the Courtesy Guides for Aristocratic Boys and Girls of Amanieu de Sescas." Essays in Medieval Studies, 20 (2003), pp. 75–84.
