= Henry of Castile =

Henry of Castile may refer to:

- Henry I of Castile (1204–1217), king
- Henry of Castile the Senator (1230–1304)
- Henry of Castile (1288–1299), son of Sancho IV of Castile
- Henry II of Castile (1334–1379), king
- Henry of Castile (1377–1404), illegitimate son of Henry II of Castile
- Henry III of Castile (1379–1406), king, a.k.a. Henry the Sufferer or Henry the Infirm
- Henry IV of Castile (1425–1474), king, a.k.a. Henry the Impotent
