= Guiraut de Calanso =

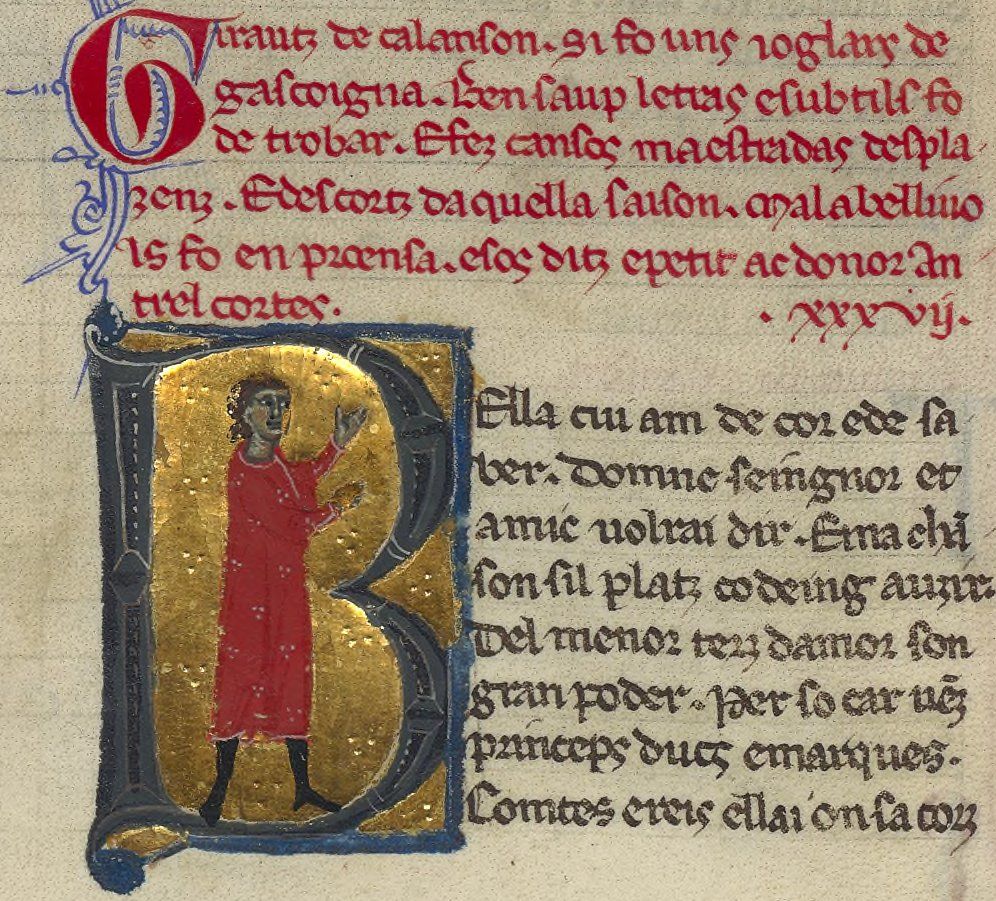
Girautz de calanson si fo uns ioglars de gascoigna. . . "Guiraut de Calanso was a jongleur from Gascony. . ."

Giraut or Guiraut de Calanso or Calanson (fl. 1202–1212) was a Gascon troubadour in the Occitan language. Of his lyric works that remain five are cansos, two descorts, a congé, a planh, and a vers (generic poem). He also wrote a mock ensenhamen (didactic poem) entitled Fadet juglar.

Guiraut's hometown cannot be located. It may be a Calanso in Gascony or one of two locales named Chalançon, one in Ardèche and one in Drôme. According to his vida he was originally a jongleur well-versed in letters. His vida indicates that he composed "skillful songs desplazens and descortz." The meaning of desplazens is under dispute: it could refer to a type of verse expressing displeasure or be an adjective ("displeasing in tone") modifying "songs" (cansos). The author of the vida notes that these works were of the type d'aquella saison, "of that time", and were disliked in Provence, where he was disrespected among courtly society. This may point to a Gascon literary tradition (or fad, as the case may be) distinct to that region and unpopular outside it. A clue to this tradition may be found in the vida of Peire de Valeira, who also wrote songs "of that time" which were "of little value".

Guiraut was an often present at the courts of Castile, León, and Aragon. His sole planh (lament) was written on the death of Ferdinand, the heir-apparent of Alfonso VIII of Castile, who died of illness during a campaign against the Moors. Guiraut describes him thus:

Lo larc e.l franc, lo valen e.l grazitz, Don cuiavon qu'en fos esmendatz Lo jove reys, e.n Richartz lo prezatz E.l coms Jaufres, tug li trey valen fraire.	The generous and frank, the worthy and attractive of whom men thought that in him were increased the qualities of the young king, of Richard the high renowned, and of the Count Godfrey, all the three valiant brothers.

Of the rest of Guiraut's corpus at least two works are conscious imitations. His lone vers is in imitation of Arnaut Daniel. Fadet juglar mockingly attacks a jongleur's ignorance in imitation of a similar work by Guiraut de Cabreira. Much later, in 1280, Guiraut Riquier, for a competition, wrote a commentary on a work of Guiraut de Calanso's for Henry II of Rodez. None of Guiraut de Calanso's music, if he wrote any, has survived.

== Sources ==
- Aubrey, Elizabeth "References to Music in Old Occitan Literature." Acta Musicologica, 61:2 (May–Aug., 1989), pp. 110–149.
- Chaytor, H. J. The Troubadours. Cambridge: Cambridge University Press, 1912.
- Egan, Margarita, ed. and trans. The Vidas of the Troubadours. New York: Garland, 1984. ISBN 0-8240-9437-9.
- Gaunt, Simon, and Kay, Sarah (edd.) The Troubadours: An Introduction. Cambridge: Cambridge University Press, 1999. ISBN 0-521-57473-0.
- Harvey, Ruth. "Courtly culture in medieval Occitania" (pp. 8–27). The Troubadours: An Introduction. Simon Gaunt and Sarah Kay, edd. Cambridge: Cambridge University Press, 1999. ISBN 0-521-57473-0.
- Wilson, Elizabeth R. "Old Provençal "vidas" as Literary Commentary." Romance Philology, 33:4 (1980:May), pp. 510–518.
