= Ensenhamen =

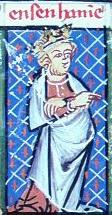
Ensenhame personified as a king in the 14th-century Breviari d'amor of Matfre Ermengau

An ensenhamen (Old Provençal pronunciation: [enseɲaˈmen], 'instruction' or 'teaching') was an Old Occitan didactic (often lyric) poem associated with the troubadours. As a genre of Occitan literature, its limits have been open to debate since it was first defined in the 19th century. The word ensenhamen has many variations in old Occitan: essenhamen, ensegnamen, enseinhamen, and enseignmen.

The ensenhamen had its own subgenres, such as "conduct literature" that told noblewomen the proper way to comport themselves and "mirror of princes" literature that told the nobleman how to be chivalrous. Besides these were types defining and encouraging courtly love and courtly behaviour, from topics as mundane as table manners to issues of sexual ethics.

The earliest attestable ensenhamen was written around 1155 by Garin lo Brun. It is the Ensenhamen de la donsela 'Instruction of the girl'. Around 1170 Arnaut Guilhem de Marsan wrote the Ensenhamen del cavaier 'Instruction of the knight' for a warrior audience. A decade or so later Arnaut de Mareuil wrote a long, classically informed ensenhamen on cortesia 'courtesy'. In the 1220s or 1230s the subject of honour was treated by the Italian troubadour Sordel in his Ensenhamen d'onor and by Uc de Saint Circ in a similarly titled work. Late in the thirteenth century the Catalan Cerverí de Girona wrote an ensenhamen of proverbs in 1,197 quartets for his son. Even later, another Catalan troubadour, Amanieu de Sescars, composed two ensenhamens: the Ensenhamen del scudier 'Instruction of the squire' dictating ideal knightly behaviour and the Ensenhamen de la donsela 'Instruction of the girl' prescribing respectable behaviour for young women. Daude de Pradas wrote an ensenhamen on the four cardinal virtues. Peire Lunel wrote L'essenhamen del guarso in 1326, the latest example of the genre. At de Mons and Raimon Vidal are other known contributors to the genre.

There were also mock ensenhamens designed to satirise the jongleurs. Fadet juglar by Guiraut de Calanso is an example. Bertran de Paris and Guiraut de Cabreira (Cabra joglar) are also known to have written this way.

== Sources ==
- Gaunt, Simon; Kay, Sarah, eds. (1999). The Troubadours: An Introduction. Cambridge: Cambridge University Press. ISBN 0-521-57473-0.
- Monson, Don A. (1981). Les 'ensenhamens' occitans: essai de definition et délimitation du genre (in French). Paris: Libraire C. Klincksieck. ISBN 2-252-02319-8.
- de Riquer, Martín (1975). Los trovadores: historia literaria y textos (in Spanish). Vol. 1–3. Barcelona: Planeta.
