= Bertran de Paris de Roergue =

Start of one of Bertran's songs in Chansonnier La Vallière

Bertran de Paris de Roergue (fl. post 1260) was a troubadour who composed the enseignamen "Gordo, ie.us fatz un sol sirventes l'an". The Hungarian scholar István Frank hypothesised that Bertran hailed from Parisot and re-classified his work as a sirventes. He has been identified with Bertran IV de Paris.
