= Peire de Valeira =

French troubadour

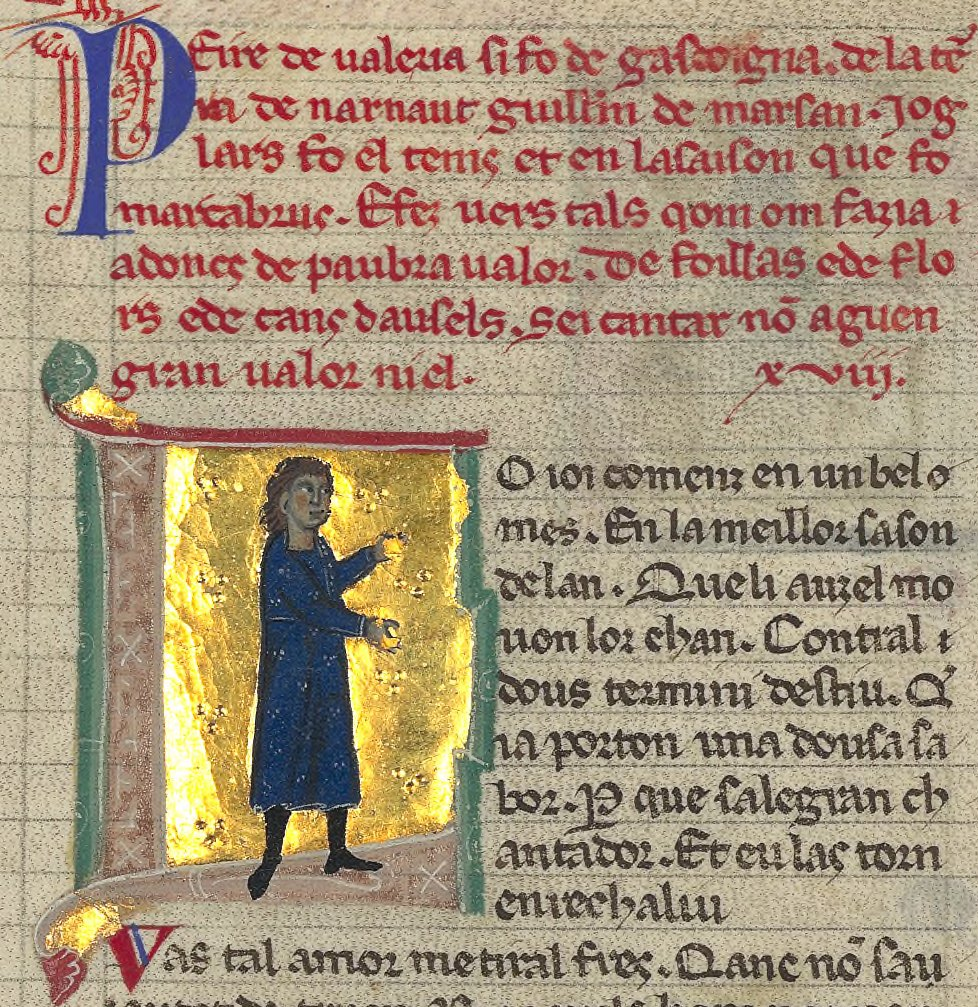
Peire de valeria si fo de gascoigna de la terra de narnaut guillim de marsan. . . "Peire de Valeira was from Gascony, from the land of Sir Arnaut Guillem de Marsan. . ."

Peire de Valeira, Valeria, or Valera (fl. early–mid twelfth century) was a Gascon troubadour. Since troubadour poetry probably originated in northwest Aquitaine (Poitou and Saintonge) and first spread—within a generation—south into Gascony, Peire was one of the earliest troubadours. Only two of his poems survive, one canso ("Vezer volgra n'Ezelgarda") and one cobla ("Qui qu'Amors don son voler").

His birthplace was Valera, near Podensac and Saint-Macaire in the Gironde. His vida places his birthplace in the fief of Arnaut Guillem de Marsan, who was himself a troubadour. He was a contemporary of Marcabru and originally a jongleur. His poems were typical for the time, according to Uc de Saint Circ, the probable author of his vida, being about natural objects (like leaves, flowers, and birds), but not of great value to the biographer's time. But Uc saves his harshest critique for the end, as Elizabeth Poe relates:

The unexpected afterthough, one of the factors contributing to the humor of the sentence ... is another typical device of Uc's style. He catches us off guard with this tactic at the end of the short vida about Peire de Valeira, for example, which he concludes with the harsh judgement: Sei cantar non aguen gran valor "His songs did not have much value" . . .and just when we think he has completed his devastating critique, he adds ni el "and neither did he."

Peire's entire vida, found in MSS I and K, however, is probably unreliable, since it appears to confuse him with another Gascon troubadour, Arnaut de Tintinhac.

Peire is often placed in a hypothetical "school" of poetry which includes Bernart de Ventadorn, Cercamon, Jaufre Rudel, Marcabru, Marcoat, and Peire Rogier among others. Further, the references in his vida to songs of the time concerning leaves, flowers, songs, and birds may be evidence for an early troubadour genre which did not survive. It may also be that the distinctiveness of Peire's genre was regional, a Gascon style. The later Gascon troubadour Guiraut de Calanso wrote verses that were d'aquella saison ("of that time") and disliked in Provence, perhaps pointing to a Gascon tradition (or "literary fad") which was not popular outside of Gascoigna (Gascony). The paubra valor ("poor value") of Peire's songs may be a reflection of the popularity of Gascon influence.

== Sources ==
- Egan, Margarita, ed. and trans. The Vidas of the Troubadours. New York: Garland, 1984. ISBN 0-8240-9437-9.
- Harvey, Ruth. "Eleanor of Aquitaine and the Troubadours." The World of Eleanor of Aquitaine: Literature and Society in Southern France between the Eleventh and Twelfth Centuries, edd. Marcus Bull and Catherine Léglu. Woodbridge: Boydell Press, 2005. ISBN 1-84383-114-7.
- Poe, Elizabeth W. "The vidas and razos." A Handbook of the Troubadours. F. R. P. Akehurst and Judith M. Davis, edd. Berkeley: University of California Press, 1995. ISBN 0-520-07976-0.
- Riquer, Martín de. Los trovadores: historia literaria y textos. 3 vol. Barcelona: Planeta, 1975.
- Wilson, Elizabeth R. "Old Provençal "vidas" as Literary Commentary." Romance Philology, 33:4 (1980:May), pp. 510–518.
- Zumthor, Paul. "Les marques du chant: le point de vue du philologue." Revue de musicologie, 73:1 (1987), pp. 7–18.
