= At de Mons =

N'At de Mons was a troubadour of the latter half of the thirteenth century. He was from Mons, near Toulouse. Kings James I of Aragon (1213–76) and Alfonso X of Castile (1252–84) acted as his patrons and he addressed "La valors es grans e l'onors", a sirventes on the rights of kings, to James. At is also credited as the author of a cobla esparsa (single stanza), "Reys rix romieus mas man milhors".

At's longest surviving work is "Sitot non es enquistz", an ensenhamen comprising five letters, including three to James and one to Alfonso. The latter ("Al bo rei de Castela") can be dated to between 1266, when Alfonso conquered the Kingdom of Murcia, and 1275, when he renounced his imperial candidacy.

== Sources ==
- Chaytor, H. J. (1912). The Troubadours. Cambridge: Cambridge University Press.
- Jeanroy, Alfred (1934). La poésie lyrique des troubadours. Toulouse: Privat.
- Snow, Joseph T. (1995). "The Iberian Peninsula." A Handbook of the Troubadours edd. F. R. P. Akehurst and Judith M. Davis. Berkeley: University of California Press. ISBN 0-520-07976-0.
- Cigni, F. (2001). "Il trovatore N'At de Mons di Tolosa." Studi Mediolatini e Volgari, XLVII, 251–273.
- Cigni, F. (2012). Il trovatore N'At de Mons: Edizione critica. Pisa: Pacini.
