= Garin lo Brun =

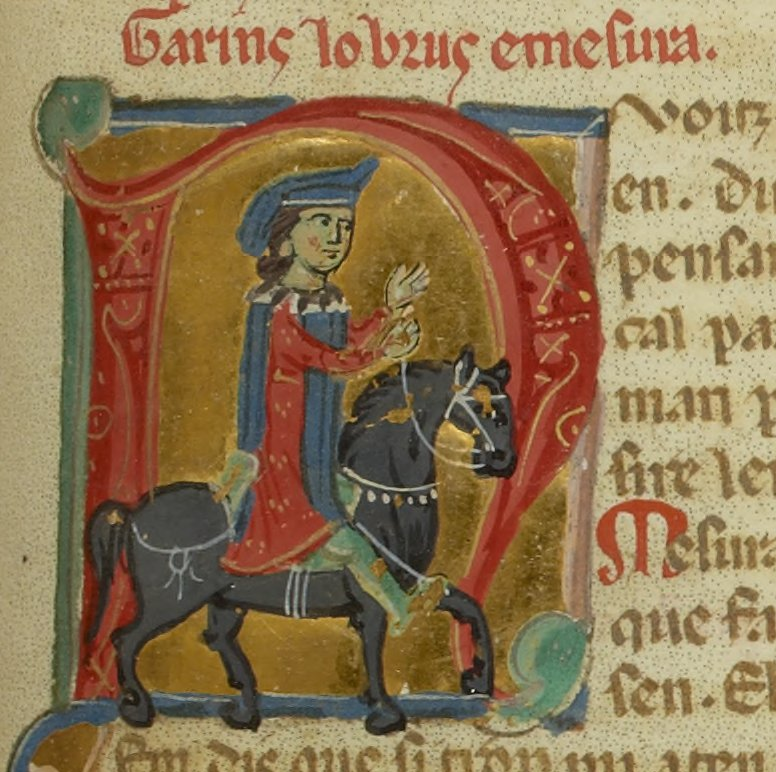
Garin lo Brun

Garin lo Brun or le Brun (Latin: Garis Bruni; died 1156/1162) was an early Auvergnat troubadour.

== Life ==
Garin lived in the Diocese of Le Puy-en-Velay, where his family owned castles. He was himself lord of Châteauneuf-de-Randon in the Gévaudan and a vassal of Ermengarde of Narbonne and of Eleanor of Aquitaine. His origins were either in the Diocese of Mende or in Randon. If he was of Randon, then his father was Garin (Guérin) de Randon, a vassal of Raymond Berengar III, Count of Barcelona, of whom Guérin and his brother Odilon held the castle of Randon. This is likely, as a Garin paid homage to the count of Barcelona for this castle in 1150. In 1162, Garin lo Brun appears to have died, as in that year his brother William (Guillaume), called Randon protecteur des troubadours ("Randon, Protector of Troubadours"), arranged a requiem mass for him and granted Grosvialla (Groviala) to the Knights Templar for the rest of his soul.

== Tenso ==
Garin composed mostly tensos, but only one of these has survived and is an imaginary dialogue between Mezura (moderation) and Leujaria (lightness), that is, both sides of the debate are written by Garin. For Lightness, the true wisdom in love is folly: a man must get on, lose no chances, and show boldness to obtain the favour of ladies of the highest possible rank. Moderation, on the other hand, advises self-restraint in love, treading softly without showing impatience. Moderation's advice to women is not to give all they have suddenly, leaving nothing to offer. This tenso was dedicated to one Eblon de Saignes.

The medievalist Mark Johnston notes that Garin's work is similar to that of another 12th-century troubadour poet, Arnaut Guilhem de Marsan.

== Ensenhamen ==
The author of Garin's vida (biography) comments that "he went to the trouble of telling the ladies how they should behave themselves."

Garin wrote the earliest known example of an ensenhamen or didactic (teaching) poem to have survived, which has the title El termini d'estiu. This is written in isometric rhymed hexameter and has been dated to 1155. Perhaps the earliest known text is contained in the Pierpont Morgan Library's MS 819, an illuminated manuscript of the 13th century, in which Garin's poem is contained together with another similar didactic work by Arnaut de Mareuil, in the first fifty-two folios.

Garin's work has over a hundred verses on the beauty of nature and the sorry state of contemporary mores, but its main theme is the courtly behaviour of women. It is therefore sometimes called Ensenhamen de la donzela ("Ensenhamen of the girl") or L'ensegnamen alla dama ("The ensenhamen to woman"). It is part of the medieval "conduct literature" which urges women to adapt themselves to their husbands, to be merry or sad as their men are merry or sad. Garin counsels also that women should sing and recite poetry for their guests.

An excerpt from the Ensenhamen says:

Joglars e chantadors, que paraulan d'amors e canton sons e lais, per que l'om es plus gais, e meton in corage de tot prez vassallage, retenez amoros.	Joglars and singers, who speak of love and sing melodies and lais, which gladden people, and who inspire courage to undertake all feats of bravery, you should honor with your affection.

Another passage of the Ensenhamen which is sometimes quoted advises women to "welcome entertainers and poets who chatter of love and sing verses and melodies. At least, show them a good face, for if you give them nothing, they will make your name known far and wide."
