= Mafalda of Castile =

Spanish noblewoman

Mafalda
- Infanta of Castile
- Born: 1191; Plasencia
- Died: 1204 (aged 12–13); Salamanca
- Buried: Abbey of Santa María la Real de Las Huelgas
- Father: Alfonso VIII of Castile
- Mother: Eleanor of England

Mafalda de Castilla (1191—1204) was an Infanta of Castile and daughter of Alfonso VIII of Castile and Eleanor of England and sister of Henry I of Castile and Berenguela of Castile.

She would have been married to Ferdinand of León, but she died in 1204 in Salamanca. She was buried at Abbey of Santa María la Real de Las Huelgas in Burgos. Her epitaph is "AQUÍ YACE DOÑA MAFALDA, HIJA DE ALFONSO VIII Y DE LA REINA DOÑA LEONOR Y HERMANA DE DOÑA BERENGUELA, QUE FINÓ EN SALAMANCA POR CASAR, EN 1204". The infante Pedro de Castilla y de Molina was buried in the same nave.

== Bibliography ==
- Arco y Garay, Ricardo (1954). Sepulcros de la Casa Real de Castilla. Madrid: Instituto Jerónimo Zurita. Consejo Superior de Investigaciones Científicas. OCLC 11366237.
- Martínez Díez, Gonzalo (2007). Alfonso VIII, rey de Castilla y Toledo (1158-1214). Gijón: Ediciones Trea, S.L. ISBN 978-84-9704-327-4.
