= Castilian–Leonese War (1196–1197) =

1196–1197 war between Castile and Leon

Castilian–Leonese War of 1196–1197
- Part of Almohad wars in the Iberian Peninsula
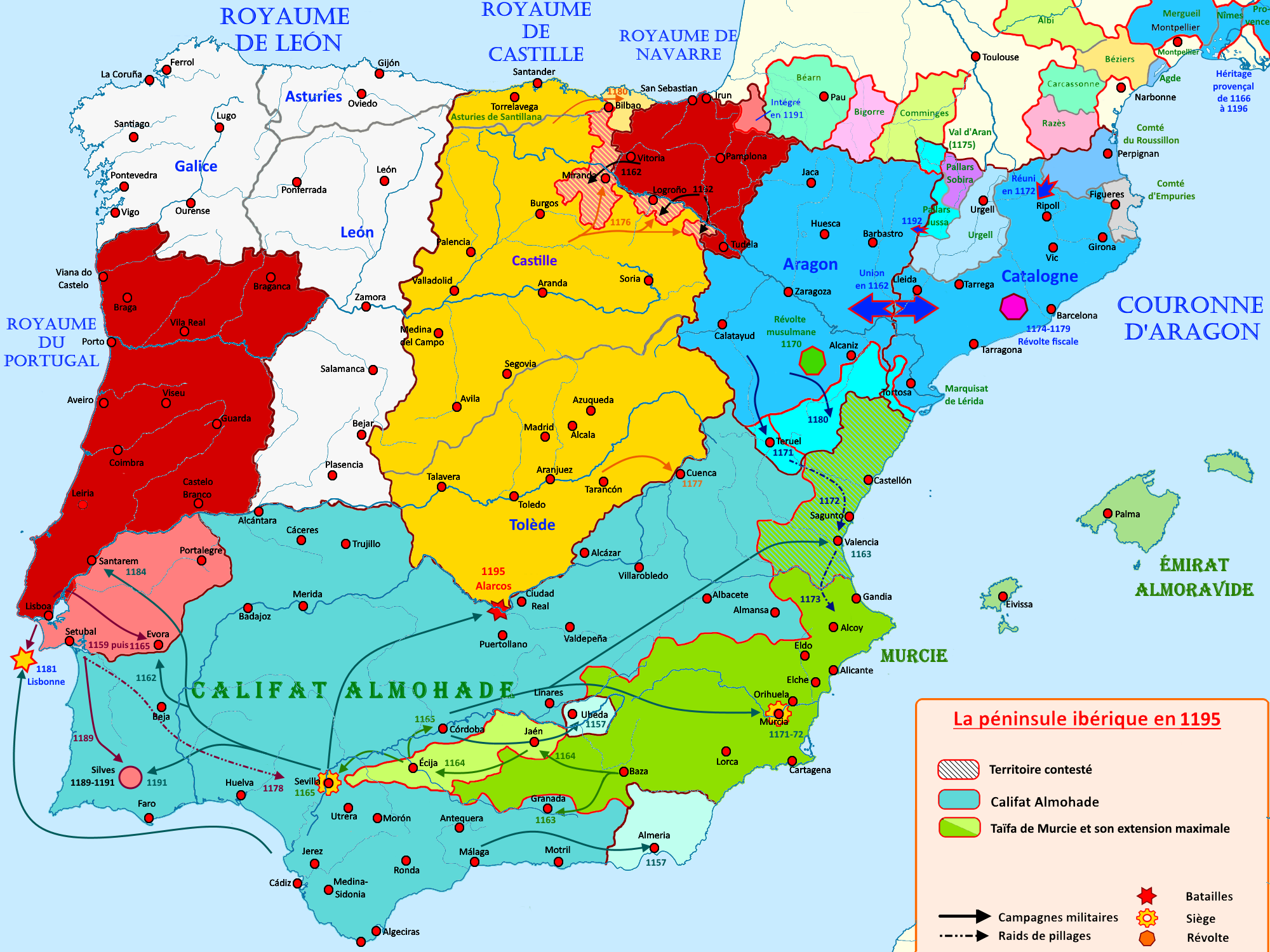
- Map of the Iberian Peninsula in 1195; 1 year before the war started.
Date	1196–1197
Location	Iberian Peninsula
Result	Castilian victory
Territorial changes	Status quo ante bellum

Belligerents
Kingdom of Castile Crown of Aragon; Lordship of Albarracin; Kingdom of Portugal	Kingdom of León Kingdom of Navarre Almohad Caliphate

Commanders and leaders
Alfonso VIII of Castile Diego López II de Haro Peter II of Aragon Fernando Ruiz de Azagra Sancho I of Portugal	Ferdinand II of León Sancho VII of Navarre Yaqub al-Mansur Pedro Fernández de Castro

Strength
1,000 Aragonese combatants	Unknown

Casualties and losses
Unknown	Unknown

The Castilian–Leonese War of 1196–1197 was a conflict between the kingdoms of Leon, Navarre and the Almohad Caliphate against the kingdoms of Castile and Aragon.

In the middle of the conflict, Alfonso IX of León was accused by pope Celestine III of allying himself with a Muslim to fight against a Christian kingdom and was excommunicated, causing Portugal to join the war against León. In the end, the Almohads signed a truce with Alfonso VIII of Castile and Alfonso IX, seeing that he was abandoned by his ally and his kingdom now was being invaded, had to ask for peace. Alfonso IX married Alfonso VIII's daughter, Berengaria of Castile, which eventually led to a peace between both kingdoms.

== Background ==
After the Castilian–Leonese War (1188–1194), the Kingdom of Castile and the Kingdom of Leon, with papal mediation, signed the Treaty of Tordehumos, which also led to an alliance between both kingdoms and the Kingdom of Navarre to attack the Almohad Caliphate.

In 1195, Alfonso VIII of Castile launched a campaign against the Almohad Caliphate. The Almohad caliph, Yaqub al-Mansur, landed in the Iberian Peninsula in July of the same year to repel the invaders. The Kingdom of León and the Kingdom of Navarre, since they had an alliance with Alfonso VIII, offered to send an army commanded by their respective monarchs, Alfonso IX of León and Sancho VII of Navarre, which he accepted. But Alfonso VIII, seeing that they were taking too long to arrive, decided to face the Almohads alone at the castle of Alarcos, thus breaking the treaty they had signed a year earlier in Tordehumos.

However, Alfonso VIII lost the battle, which was very disastrous for his kingdom. Following the defeat of Castile, Alfonso IX, Sancho VII and Sancho I of Portugal tried to make an alliance with the Almohad Caliphate while the Crown of Aragon decided to support Alfonso VIII of Castile. The Pope tried to avoid this war by calling them to an alliance against the Almohad Caliphate. Although Navarre was initially willing to help Castile and Aragon, they made a plan to divide Navarre, which caused Sancho VII to ally himself with Yaqub al-Mansur. War was inevitable and in the year 1196, hostilities began.

== War ==
=== 1196 ===
Abu Yaqub Yusuf, taking advantage of the fact that Castile was still recovering from the battle of Alarcos, began a campaign with Leonese support in the spring of the same year. He entered through Extremadura, conquering Escalona, Santa Olalla and Talavera de la Reina. After taking these towns, he besieged Toledo but was defended successfully by Alfonso VIII and 1,000 Aragonese men led by Peter II of Aragon. However, this did not make him give up and shortly after the siege of Toledo, he attacked Madrid, Talamanca de Jarama, Alcalá de Henares, Mount Angio and Turgelo but was unsuccessful in Madrid and Alcalá de Henares, which were defended by Diego López II de Haro. On the way back to Africa, he raided Guadalajara, Cuenca, Oreja, Huete and Uclés.

Seeing that Alfonso VII was occupied fighting with the Almohads, Alfonso IX and Pedro Fernández de Castro, with Almohad and Navarrese troops, invaded Castile from Tierra de Campos and reached Carrión de los Condes and Villasirga. Alfonso VIII, after defending Toledo from the Almohads, responded by invading the Kingdom of León from the same region. He had again the support of Peter II of Aragon. Alfonso VIII started his campaign by taking Coyanza and unsuccessfully besieging León between July 23 and 25. He took Castro de los Judíos de Mayorga and burned the synagogue of the town on July 25, enslaving its population the next day. He continued his campaign by conquering Castroverde de Campos, Valencia de Don Juan and Ardón, approaching Benavente and reaching as far as El Bierzo, near Portugal. However, he was not able to take Astorga.

While León and Castile were fighting in Tierra de Campos, Sancho VII of Navarre took the opportunity and started another campaign against Castile. He ravaged the lands of Logroño and reached the towns of Soria, Medinaceli and Almazán.

On 31 October 1196, Pope Celestine III accused Alfonso IX of León of allying himself with the Muslims to fight a Christian kingdom and ordered the archbishops of Toledo and Santiago de Compostela to publish the excommunication of the Leonese monarch. After seeing this, Sancho I of Portugal declared war on the Kingdom of León, invading Galicia in the same year.

=== 1197 ===
After a year of his last campaign, Yaqub al-Mansur decided to start another one. He left Córdoba and, upon reaching Castilian territory, attacked Talavera de la Reina and Maqueda, followed by another siege in Toledo that also failed. He continued his campaign by attacking Madrid, Guadalajara, Oreja, Uclés, Huete, Cuenca and Alarcón. This time, most of these cities were defended by Fernando Ruiz de Azagra, Lord of Albarracín. Some sources say that it was not such a disastrous campaign and that no towns were captured, while others say the opposite. In any case, Alfonso VIII signed a ten-year truce with Yaqub on June, which meant he could focus on his war against León.

Alfonso IX found himself in a difficult situation: his ally, Yaqub al-Mansur, had abandoned him and now he had no support from anyone. So Alfonso VIII and Peter II, now at peace with the Almohads, launched another campaign against León, this time invading the south. He took Alba de Tormes, Barruecopardo, Bolaños de Campos, Paradinas de San Juan, Carpio de Azaba, Monreal and Alpalio while Sancho I of Portugal conquered Tui and Pontevedra.

=== Peace ===
Finally, both kings agreed to a marriage between the Leonese monarch and Berengaria of Castile (daughter of Alfonso VIII) at Valladolid in October 1197, which was allegedly approved by Pope Celestine III who had already annulled the marriage between the Leonese monarch and Theresa of Portugal. According to the English chronicler Roger of Howden, the Pope connived this marriage as Pro bono pacis, "For the sake of peace". However, a letter from Innocent III confirms Celestine never knew about this marriage.

== Aftermath ==
Although this marriage brought peace between Alfonso VIII of Castile, Peter II of Aragon and Alfonso IX of León, Portugal continued at war with the kingdom of León, in which Castile almost re-joined, this time supporting Alfonso IX. Tui and Pontevedra were recovered by the Leonese probably in 1199 and Alfonso IX launched an invasion of Portugal in the same year, besieging Bragança without success. Both kingdoms eventually signed a peace treaty in 1200.

The war between Navarre and Castile also continued. Alfonso VIII and Peter II, supported by Alfonso IX from 1200, agreed to divide the Kingdom of Navarre. Eventually, Navarre lost the war and had to cede much of its territory, including Guipúzcoa and Vitoria, to Castile and Aragon.

The peace between Alfonso VIII and his cousin Alfonso IX did not last long: they went to war between 1204 and 1206 and again in 1212, but this last war was short-lived as Alfonso VIII was in a crusade against the Almohads and Pope Innocent III forced them to make peace. The crusade was successful, starting the beginning the decline of the Almohad Caliphate, which would also cause its breakup in the Iberian Peninsula and the beginning of the Third Taifas period.

== Bibliography ==
- Alcaide, Luis Jiménez (14 November 2022). Historia de los reinos cristianos: Los monarcas de la reconquista, desde Don Pelayo hasta Juana la Loca (in Spanish). Editorial Almuzara. ISBN 978-84-1131-511-1.
- Archivos leoneses (in Spanish). Centro de Estudios e Investigación San Isidoro. 1989.
- Bianchini, Janna (16 August 2012). The Queen's Hand: Power and Authority in the Reign of Berenguela of Castile. University of Pennsylvania Press. ISBN 978-0-8122-0626-5.
- Bilbao, José María Gorordo (18 December 2018). Bizkaia en la Edad Media: Tomo I: Un debate historiográfico. Tomo II: Origen y naturaleza de los derechos históricos (in Spanish). Ediciones Beta III Milenio. ISBN 978-84-17634-12-4.
- Boletín de la Real Academia de la Historia (in Spanish). University of Minnesota: Real Academia de la Historia. 1958.
- Catalán, Diego (2002). El Cid en la historia y sus inventores (in Spanish). Fundación Ramón Menéndez Pidal. ISBN 978-84-89934-06-1.
- Duro, Cesáreo Fernández (1882). Memorias historicas de la ciudad de Zamora, su provincia y obispado (in Spanish). Sucesores de Rivadeneyra.
- Enciclopedia hispánica: Macropedia (in Spanish). Encyclopædia Britannica Publishers. 1994. ISBN 978-1-56409-007-2.
- Fernández, Luis Suárez (1976). Historia de España antigua y media (in Spanish). Rialp. ISBN 978-84-321-1866-1.
- Fitz, Francisco Garcia (2005). Las Navas de Tolosa: La batalla del castigo (in Spanish). Desperta Ferro Ediciones. ISBN 8412806816.
- Fitz, Francisco García (2002). Relaciones políticas y guerra: La experiencia castellano-leonesa frente al Islam, siglos XI-XIII (in Spanish). Universidad de Sevilla. ISBN 978-84-472-0708-4.
- Flood, Timothy M. (27 November 2018). Rulers and Realms in Medieval Iberia, 711-1492. McFarland. ISBN 978-1-4766-7471-1.
- France, John (February 2006). The Crusades and the Expansion of Catholic Christendom, 1000-1714. Routledge. ISBN 978-1-134-19617-3.
- García, Ángel Barrios (1983). Estructuras agrarias y de poder en Castilla: El ejemplo de Avila (1085-1320) (in Spanish). University of Salamanca. ISBN 978-84-00-05453-3.
- Gerli, E. Michael (4 December 2013). Medieval Iberia: An Encyclopedia. Routledge. ISBN 978-1-136-77162-0.
- Gómez, Miguel; Lincoln, Kyle C.; Smith, Damian J. (2 April 2019). King Alfonso VIII of Castile: Government, Family, and War. Fordham University Press. ISBN 978-0-8232-8416-0.
- González, Antonio Viñayo (1948). San Martín de León y su apologética antijudía (in Spanish). Consejo Superior de Investigaciones Científicas, Instituto Arias Montana de Estudios Hebraicos y Oriente Próximo.
- Hispania: Revista española de historia. El Instituto. 1958.
- Kennedy, Hugh (11 June 2014). Muslim Spain and Portugal: A Political History of al-Andalus. Routledge. ISBN 978-1-317-87041-8.
- Kohn, George C. (2006). Dictionary of Wars. Infobase. ISBN 9781438129167.
- Lamort, S. (1843). Mémoires de l'Académie royale de Metz. Lamort.
- de León, Monte de Piedad (1993). El reino de León en la alta Edad media: La monarquía (1109-1230). IV (in Spanish). Centro de Estudios e Investigación "San Isidoro" (CSIC-CECEL). ISBN 978-84-87667-08-4.
- Livermore, H.V. (1947). A History of Portugal. University Press.
- Llorente, Félix J. Martínez (2019). Memoria de un rey, memoria de un reinado: Fernando III, Rey de Castilla y León, 1217-1252 (in Spanish). Junta de Castilla y León, Consejería de Cultura y Turismo. ISBN 978-84-9718-696-4.
- Marín, Aurelio Pretel (2007). Del Albacete islámico: Notas y conjeturas (in Spanish). Instituto de Estudios Albacetenses "Don Juan Manuel". ISBN 978-84-96800-02-1.
- al-Marrakushi, Abdelwahid (1224). Al-Mojib fi Talkhis Akhbar al-Maghrib (The Pleasant In Summarizing the History of the Maghreb) (in Arabic).
- Martin, Georges (2010). Construir la identidad en la Edad Media (in Spanish). Univ de Castilla La Mancha. ISBN 9788490440254.
- Martín, Luis Vicente Díaz (1994). Santo Domingo de Caleruega, en su contexto socio-político, 1170-1221 (in Spanish). Editorial San Esteban. ISBN 978-84-87557-77-4.
- Martínez, Carlos de Ayala (2007). Las órdenes militares hispánicas en la Edad Media (Siglos XII-XV) (in Spanish). Marcial Pons Historia. ISBN 978-84-96467-49-1.
- Martínez, Salvador H. (15 November 2021). Berenguela the Great and Her Times (1180-1246). BRILL. ISBN 978-90-04-50290-1.
- Morton, Nicholas (11 September 2014). The Medieval Military Orders: 1120-1314. Routledge. ISBN 978-1-317-86146-1.
- Murray, Alan V. (30 August 2006). The Crusades: An Encyclopedia [4 volumes]. Bloomsbury Publishing USA. ISBN 978-1-57607-863-1.
- Nolan, Cathal J. (2006). The Age of Wars of Religion, 1000-1650: An Encyclopedia of Global Warfare and Civilization. Greenwood Press. ISBN 9780313337338.
- Obradó, María del Pilar Rábade; Vaquero, Eloísa Ramírez; Utrilla, Juan F. Utrilla (January 2005). La dinámica política (in Spanish). Ediciones AKAL. ISBN 978-84-7090-433-2.
- A Political History of Muslim Spain. Najmah Sons. 1961.
- Reilly, Bernard F. (3 June 1993). The Medieval Spains. Cambridge University Press. ISBN 978-0-521-39741-4.
- Smith, Colin (24 March 1983). The Making of the Poema de Mio Cid. Cambridge University Press. ISBN 978-0-521-24992-8.
- Taylor, Francis (5 December 2016). Pope Innocent III and his World. Routledge. ISBN 978-1-351-91006-4.
- Theotokis, Georgios (31 July 2019). Twenty Battles That Shaped Medieval Europe. The Crowood Press. ISBN 978-0-7198-2874-4.
- Travel, DK (2017). DK Eyewitness Travel Guide Morocco. Dorling Kindersley Limited. ISBN 9780241304693.
- de Valdeavellano, Luis García (1952). Historia de España: De los orígenes a la baja Edad Media. Revista de Occidente.
