= Marcoat =

Marcoat was a minor Gascon troubadour and joglar who flourished in the mid twelfth century. He is often cited in connexion with Eleanor of Aquitaine and is placed in a hypothetical "school" of poetry which includes Bernart de Ventadorn, Marcabru, Cercamon, Jaufre Rudel, Peire Rogier, and Peire de Valeria among others. Of all his works, only two sirventes survive: Mentre m'obri eis huisel and Una re.us dirai, en Serra.

Marcoat was an innovator building off the work of the contemporary Gascon Marcabru, whose death he recalls in one of his works c. 1150. Nonetheless, his works are very simple, the stanzas being composed of three heptasyllables rhyming in the form AAB. It was he who first used the term sirventes to describe his poems; the word appears in both of his surviving works, twice in one:

Mentre m'obri eis huisel,
un sirventes escubel
en giteira inz s'arena
. . .
Mon serventes no val plus,
que faitz es de bos moz clus
apren lo, Domeing Sarena.

The meaning of these verses is obscure, as he was an early practitioner of the trobar clus style. According to himself, he wrote vers contradizentz (contradictory verses). He was a model for the later troubadour Raimbaut d'Aurenga.

== Sources ==
- Bloch, R. Howard. Etymologies and Genealogies: A Literary Anthropology of the French Middle Ages. Chicago: University of Chicago Press, 1983. ISBN 0-226-05982-0.
- Chambers, Frank M. An Introduction to Old Provençal Versification. Diane Publishing, 1985. ISBN 0-87169-167-1.
- Dejeanne, Jean-Marie-Lucien. "Marcoat." Annales du Midi, xv (1903).
- Harvey, Ruth. "Eleanor of Aquitaine and the Troubadours." The World of Eleanor of Aquitaine: Literature and Society in Southern France between the Eleventh and Twelfth Centuries, edd. Marcus Bull and Catherine Léglu. Woodbridge: Boydell Press, 2005. ISBN 1-84383-114-7.
- Léglu, Catherine. "Moral and satirical poetry." The Troubadours: An Introduction. edd. Simon Gaunt and Sarah Kay. Cambridge: Cambridge University Press, 1999. ISBN 0-521-57473-0.
- Pfeffer, Wendy. Review of Suzanne Thiolier-Méjean, La Poétique des Troubadours: Trois Études sur le Sirventes, in Speculum, 72:1 (Jan., 1997), pp. 230–231.
- Thiolier-Méjean, Suzanne. La poétique des troubadours: Trois études sur le sirventes. Paris: Presse de l'Université de Paris-Sorbonne, 1994.
