= Ferdinand of Castile (died 1211) =

English noble (1189–1211)

Ferdinand (1189 – 14 October 1211) was an infante (royal prince), the second son and heir apparent of Alfonso VIII of Castile by his wife, Eleanor of England. He died unmarried at the age of 22, a little less than three years before his father.

Alfonso's first will, drawn up in 1204, named Ferdinand as heir to the throne and named his mother as his regent during his minority. The chroniclers are unanimous in praising Ferdinand's strength, beauty, piety and crusading zeal. According to the Chronicon mundi of the historian Lucas de Tuy, he wanted to expel all the Jews from Spain.

Ferdinand was returning through the San Vicente mountains from a campaign against the Muslims when he contracted a fever at Madrid and died. His body was accompanied by his sister, Berengaria, to Burgos for burial in the monastery of Las Huelgas. Alfonso VIII was preparing for the great crusade against Las Navas de Tolosa when he learned of his son's death. According to De rebus Hispaniae by Rodrigo Jiménez de Rada, the archbishop of Toledo, who was an eyewitness, Alfonso wept with "inconsolable grief, for he saw himself in him [Fernando] as if he were the mirror of his life" (luctus inconsolabilis genitori, quia in ipsum tanquam in uite speculum contemplabatur). According to the Chronicon mundi, Alfonso VIII "received consolation from the multitude of gathering armies even though he was sick at heart from the death of [his] son". The anonymous Chronica latina regum Castellae, written towards the middle of the century, claims Queen Eleanor threw herself on Ferdinand's body, clasped his hands and, putting her mouth to his, "strove either to revive him or to die with him" (nitebatur uel eum uiuificare uel cum eo mori).

The king first action after his son's death was to make a grant to the Hospital del Rey y de la Reina on 28 November. In the charter he "devoutly commend[ed] to the King of Kings the spirit of my dearest firstborn son, don Fernando, whom by the disposition of divine grace I could not have as heir to the throne of my kingdom." The next day, 29 November, he made an endowment to the house that held Ferdinand's remains, Las Huelgas, attributing the latter's death to divine clemency: "Whereas by the disposition of divine clemency I, Alfonso, by the grace of God king of Castile and Toledo, was not permitted to have our dearest son don Fernando (may his soul merit the enjoyment of eternal rest) as successor to our kingdom, so that he might acquire the celestial kingdom for himself. . ."

In 1212, one of the troubadours who frequented Alfonso's court, Giraut de Calanso, composed a poem, "Bel senher Dieus, quo pot esser sufritz", a verse lament, or planh, to commemorate the death of Ferdinand (Ferran in the Occitan of the poem). Never, he writes, "was such a prince seen or heard" (anc filhs de rei non fon vistz ni ausitz). Drawing on Ferdinand's English descent on his mother's side, he praises the infante as the equal of King Arthur and exceeding in virtues his own three famous uncles—Henry the Young King, Richard the Lionheart and Duke Geoffrey II of Brittany—the brothers of his mother, Eleanor:

Qu'en lui era tot los pretz restauratz Del rei Artus, qu'om sol dire et retraire, On trobavan cosselh tug bezonhos. Lo larc e.l franc, lo valen e.l grazitz, Don cuiavon qu'en fos esmendatz Lo jove reys, e.n Richartz lo prezatz E.l coms Jaufres, tug li trey valen fraire.	For in him all the worth was restored of King Arthur, of whom they said and declared that all those in need found good counsel. The generous and frank, the worthy and attractive of whom men thought that in him were increased the qualities of the young king, of Richard the high renowned, and of the Count Godfrey, all the three valiant brothers.

In a subsequent list of countries in which Ferdinand will be mourned—"from the river Jordan" (del flum Jordan) as far as France, England, Germany, Saxony (Samsuenha), Spain and Aragon—Giraut is "reminding us ... how far the power and prestige of Castile and the networking sphere of Plantagenet power extend".

== Sources ==
- Bianchini, Janna. The Queen's Hand: Power and Authority in the Reign of Berenguela of Castile. Philadelphia: University of Pennsylvania Press, 2012.
- Chaytor, Henry John. The Troubadours Cambridge: Cambridge University Press, 1912.
- Jewers, Caroline. "Another Arthur among the Troubadours". Tenso 24, 1 (2009): 20–46.
- Rucquoi, Adeline. "La royauté sous Alphonse VIII de Castille". Cahiers de linguistique hispanique médiévale 23 (2000): 215–41.
- Salvador Martínez, H. Alfonso X, the Learned: A Biography. Odile Cisneros, trans. Leiden: Brill, 2010.
- Vann, Theresa M. "The Theory and Practice of Medieval Castilian Queenship". Queens, Regents and Potentates, Women of Power, I, ed. Theresa M. Vann. Cambridge: Academia, 1993.
