= Eleanor of England, Queen of Castile =

Queen of Castile and Toledo from 1170 to 1214

Eleanor of England
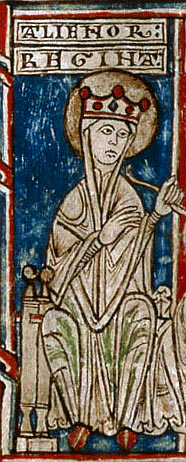

Queen consort of Castile and Toledo
- Tenure: September 1170 – 5 October 1214
- Born: c. 1161; Domfront Castle, Normandy
- Died: 31 October 1214 (aged 53); Burgos, Castile
- Burial: Abbey of Santa Maria la Real de Huelgas, Burgos
- Spouse: Alfonso VIII of Castile (m. 1170; died 1214)
- Issue more...: Berengaria, Queen of Castile; Urraca, Queen of Portugal; Blanche, Queen of France; Eleanor, Queen of Aragon; Henry I, King of Castile
- House: Plantagenet-Angevin (Note: Historians are divided in their use of the terms Plantagenet and Angevin in regard to Henry II and his children. Some class Henry II to be the first Plantagenet king of England; others refer to Henry II, Richard I, and John as the Angevin dynasty, and consider Henry III to be the first Plantagenet ruler.)
- Father: Henry II, King of England
- Mother: Eleanor, Duchess of Aquitaine

Eleanor of England (Spanish: Leonor; c. 1161 – 31 October 1214) was Queen of Castile and Toledo as the wife of Alfonso VIII of Castile. She was the sixth child and second daughter of Henry II, King of England, and Eleanor of Aquitaine. She served as Regent of Castile during the minority of her son Henry I for 26 days between the death of her husband and her own death in 1214. Her great-granddaughter and namesake, Eleanor of Castile, married the future Edward I of England in 1254.

== Early life and family ==
Eleanor was born in the castle at Domfront, Normandy c. 1161, as the second daughter of King Henry II of England and his wife Eleanor, Duchess of Aquitaine, who she was named after. She was baptised by Henry of Marcy and her godparents at her baptism were Achard, bishop of Avranches, and the abbot of Le Mont Saint Michel, Robert of Torigni.

Her full siblings were Henry the Young King, Duchess Matilda of Saxony, King Richard I, Duke Geoffrey II of Brittany, Queen Joan of Sicily and King John. Her half-siblings were Countess Marie of Champagne and Countess Alix of Blois. Eleanor had an older brother, William (17 August 1153 – April 1156), the first son of Henry II, and Eleanor of Aquitaine, who died of a seizure at Wallingford Castle, and was buried in Reading Abbey at the feet of his great-grandfather Henry I.

In 1165 her marriage was arranged to Frederick V, Duke of Swabia, the oldest son of the Holy Roman Emperor Frederick I Barbarossa and Beatrice I, Countess of Burgundy, but he died before the marriage was able to take place.

== Queenship ==
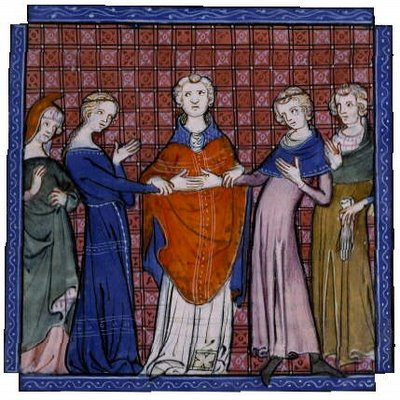
The betrothal of Alfonso VIII of Castille and Eleanor of England.

In 1170 Eleanor married King Alfonso VIII of Castile in Burgos at the age of 9. Her parents' purpose in arranging the marriage was to secure Aquitaine's Pyrenean border, while Alfonso sought an ally in his struggles with Sancho VI of Navarre. In 1177, this led to Henry overseeing arbitration of the border dispute.

Around 1200, Alfonso began to claim that the duchy of Gascony was part of Eleanor's dowry, but there is no documented foundation for that claim. It is highly unlikely that Henry II would have parted with so significant a portion of his domains. At most, Gascony may have been pledged as security for the full payment of his daughter's dowry. Her husband went so far on this claim as to invade Gascony in her name in 1205. In 1206, her brother John granted her safe passage to visit him, perhaps to try opening peace negotiations. In 1208, Alfonso yielded on the claim. Decades later, their great-grandson Alfonso X of Castile would claim the duchy on the grounds that her dowry had never been fully paid.

Of all Eleanor of Aquitaine's daughters, her namesake was the only one who was enabled, by political circumstances, to wield the kind of influence her mother had exercised. In her marriage treaty, and in the first marriage treaty for her daughter Berengaria, Eleanor was given direct control of many lands, towns, and castles throughout the kingdom, including major towns like Aguilar de Campóo, Logroño, and Calahorra. She was almost as powerful as Alfonso, who specified in his will in 1204 that she was to rule alongside their son in the event of his death, including taking responsibility for paying his debts and executing his will. It was she who persuaded him to marry their daughter Berengaria to Alfonso IX of León.

Troubadours and sages were regularly present in Alfonso VIII's court due to Eleanor's patronage. The Catalan poet, Ramon Vidal de Besalu, wrote about Eleanor and described her as wrapped in a red silk mantle with Angevin lions, and Guillem de Bergued addressed a poem to her.

Eleanor took a particular interest in supporting religious institutions. In 1179, she took responsibility to support and maintain the shrine to St. Thomas Becket in the cathedral of Toledo, which had been founded by Count Nuño Peréz de Lara and his wife Teresa Fernández in 1177. She made gifts to the abbeys of Grandmont and Fontevraud. She also created and supported the Abbey of Santa María la Real de Las Huelgas, outside the city of Burgos, and its affiliated hospital for pilgrims, the Hospital del Rey. It served as a refuge and tomb for her family for generations, and her daughter Constance took the veil there and became known as the Lady of Las Huelgas.

== Regent ==
When Alfonso died, Eleanor was reportedly so devastated with grief that she was unable to preside over the burial. Their eldest daughter Berengaria instead performed these honours. In accordance with the will of her late spouse, Eleanor became regent of Castile during the minority of her son, in which her daughter acted as her advisor. Her reign was not to be long, however; she was reportedly not in good enough health and left most of the affairs of state to her daughter, which created fear and opposition among the nobles that she was planning to leave the regency to her daughter.

Eleanor later became sick and died only twenty-six days after her husband, and was buried at Abbey of Santa María la Real de Las Huelgas.

== Children ==
| Name | Birth | Death | Notes |
|---|---|---|---|
| Berengaria | Burgos, 1 January/ June 1180 | Las Huelgas near Burgos, 8 November 1246 | Married firstly in Seligenstadt on 23 April 1188 with Duke Conrad II of Swabia, but the union (only by contract and never solemnised) was later annulled. Married in Valladolid between 1/16 December 1197 with King Alfonso IX of León as his second wife. After their marriage was dissolved on grounds of consanguinity in 1204, she returned to her homeland and became regent of her minor brother King Henry I. Although Queen of Castile in her own right, after the death of Henry I in 1217, Berengaria quickly abdicated in favour of her son Ferdinand III of Castile who would re-unite the kingdoms of Castile and León. |
| Sancho | Burgos, 5 April 1181 | 26 July 1181 | Robert of Torigny records the birth "circa Pascha" in 1181 of "filium Sancius" to "Alienor filia regis Anglorum uxor Anfulsi regis de Castella". "Aldefonsus...Rex Castellæ et Toleti...cum uxore mea Alienor Regina et cum filio meo Rege Sancio" donated property to the bishop of Segovia by charter dated 31 May 1181. "Adefonsus...Rex Castellæ et Toleti...cum uxore mea Alienor Regina et cum filio meo Rege Sancio" donated property to the monastery of Rocamador by charter dated 13 July 1181. |
| Sancha | 20/28 March 1182 | 3 February 1184/ 16 October 1185 | King Alfonso VIII "cum uxore mea Alionor regina et cum filiabus meis Berengaria et Sancia Infantissis" exchanged property with the Templars by charter dated 26 January 1183. |
| Henry | before July 1182 | before January 1184 | The dating clause of a charter dated July 1182 records "regnante el Rey D. Alfonso...con su mugier Doña Lionor, con su fijo D. Anric". The dating of the document in which his sister Sancha is named suggests that they may have been twins. |
| Ferdinand | before January 1184 | Died young, ca. 1184? | The dating clause of a charter dated January 1184 ("V Kal Feb Era 1222") records "regnante rege Alfonso cum uxore sua regina Eleonor et filio suo Fernando". |
| Urraca | 1186/ 28 May 1187 | Coimbra, 3 November 1220 | Married in 1206 to Infante dom Afonso of Portugal, who succeeded his father as King Afonso II on 26 March 1212. |
| Blanche | Palencia, 4 March 1188 | Paris, 27 November 1252 | Married on 23 May 1200 to Prince Louis of France, who succeeded his father as King Louis VIII on 14 July 1223. Crowned Queen at Saint-Denis with her husband on 6 August 1223. Regent of the Kingdom of France during 1226–1234 (minority of her son) and during 1248–1252 (absence of her son on Crusade). |
| Ferdinand | Cuenca, 29 September 1189 | Madrid, 14 October 1211 | Heir of the throne since his birth. On whose behalf Diego of Acebo and the future Saint Dominic travelled to Denmark in 1203 to secure a bride. Ferdinand was returning through the San Vicente mountains from a campaign against the Muslims when he contracted a fever and died. |
| Mafalda | Plasencia, 1191 | Salamanca, 1204 | Szabolcs de Vajay says that she "died at the point of becoming the fiancée of the Infante Fernando of León" (without citing the primary source on which this information is based) and refers to her burial at Salamanca Cathedral. Betrothed in 1204 to Infante Ferdinand of Leon, eldest son of Alfonso IX and stepson of her oldest sister. |
| Eleanor | 1200 | Las Huelgas, 1244 | Married on 6 February 1221 with King James I of Aragon. They became separated in April 1229 on grounds of consanguinity. |
| Constance | c. 1202 | Las Huelgas, 1243 | A nun at the Cistercian monastery of Santa María la Real at Las Huelgas in 1217, she became known as the Lady of Las Huelgas, a title shared with later royal family members who joined the community. |
| Henry | Valladolid, 14 April 1204 | Palencia, 6 June 1217 | Only surviving son, he succeeded his father in 1214 aged ten under the regency firstly of his mother and later his oldest sister. He was killed when he was struck by a tile falling from a roof. |

== Later depictions ==
Eleanor was praised for her beauty and regal nature by the poet Ramón Vidal de Besalú after her death. Her great-grandson Alfonso X referred to her as "noble and much loved".

Eleanor was played by actress Ida Norden in the silent film The Jewess of Toledo.

== Sources ==
- Andrews, J.F. (2023) The Families of Eleanor of Aquitaine: A Female Network of Power in the Middle Ages (The History Press, ISBN 9781803991214)
- Bowie, Colette (2014), The Daughters of Henry II and Eleanor of Aquitaine (Brepols, ISBN 978-2-503-54971-2)
- Cerda, José Manuel (2011), La dot gasconne d'Aliénor d'Angleterre. Entre royaume de Castille, royaume de France et royaume d'Angleterre, Cahiers de civilisation médiévale, ISSN 0007-9731, Vol. 54, Nº 215, 2011.
- Cerda, José Manuel (2012). "Leonor Plantagenet y la consolidación castellana en el reinado de Alfonso VIII". Anuario de Estudios Medievales. 42 (2): 629–652. doi:10.3989/aem.2012.42.2.04. ISSN 0066-5061.
- Cerda, José Manuel (2013), "The marriage of Alfonso VIII of Castile and Leonor Plantagenet : the first bond between Spain and England in the Middle Ages", Les stratégies matrimoniales dans l'aristocratie (xe-xiiie siècles), ed. Martin Aurell.
- Cerda, José Manuel (2016), "Matrimonio y patrimonio. La carta de arras de Leonor Plantagenet, reina consorte de Castilla", Anuario de Estudios Medievales, vol. 46.
- Cerda, José Manuel (2016), Leonor Plantagenet and the cult of Thomas Becket in Castile, The cult of St Thomas Becket in the Plantagenet World, ed. P. Webster and M.P. Gelin, Boydell Press.
- Cerda, José Manuel (2018), "Diplomacia, mecenazgo e identidad dinástica. La consorte Leonor y el influjo de la cultura Plantagenet en la Castilla de Alfonso VIII", Los modelos anglonormandos en la cultura letrada de Castilla, ed. Amaia Arizaleta y Francisco Bautista (Toulouse).
- Cerda, José Manuel (2019), "Un documento inédito y desconocido de la cancillería de la reina Leonor Plantagenet", En la España Medieval, vol. 42.
- Cerda, José Manuel (2021), Leonor de Inglaterra. La reina Plantagenet de Castilla (1161-1214), Gijón, Trea ediciones.
- Cerda, José Manuel (2026), Leonor of England. The Plantagenet queen of Castile, Oxford, Routledge.
- Fraser, Antonia (2000). The Middle Ages, A Royal History of England. University of California Press. ISBN 0-520-22799-9.
- Gillingham, John (2005). "Events and Opinions: Norman and English Views of Aquitaine, c.1152–c.1204". In Bull, Marcus; Léglu, Catherine (eds.). The World of Eleanor of Aquitaine: Literature and Society in Southern France between the Eleventh and Twelfth Centuries. Woodbridge: Boydell Press. ISBN 1-84383-114-7.
- Hamilton, J.S. (2010). The Plantagenets: History of a Dynasty. London: Continuum. ISBN 978-1-4411-5712-6. OL 28013041M.
- Mila y Fontanels, Manuel (1966). "De los trovadores en España". In Martinez, C.; Manrique, F. R. (eds.). Obras de Manuel Mila y Fontanels. Vol. 2. CSIC, Barcelona.
- Osma, Juan (1997). "Chronica latina regum Castellae". In Brea, Luis Charlo (ed.). Chronica Hispana Saeculi XIII. Turnhout: Brepols.
- Rada Jiménez, Rodrigo. Historia de los hechos de España.
- Shadis, Miriam (2010). Berenguela of Castile (1180–1246) and Political Women in the High Middle Ages. Palgrave Macmillan. ISBN 978-0-312-23473-7.
- Vann, Theresa M., ed. (1993). Queens, Regents and Potentates. Vol. I. Boydell Press.
- Wheeler, Bonnie; Parsons, John Carmi (2002). Eleanor of Aquitaine: Lord and Lady. Palgrave Macmillan. ISBN 0-230-60236-3.

Eleanor of England, Queen of Castile House of Plantagenet Born: c. 1161 Died: 31 October 1214
Spanish royalty
| Preceded by Richeza of Poland | Queen consort of Castile; 1177–1214 | Succeeded by Mafalda of Portugal |
