= Eleanor of Castile (died 1244) =

Queen of Aragon from 1221 to 1229

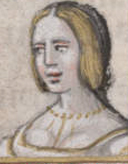

Queen consort of Aragon
- Tenure: 6 February 1221 – April 1229
- Born: 1200
- Died: 1244 (aged 43–44); Abbey of Santa María la Real de Las Huelgas near Burgos
- Spouse: James I of Aragon (m. 1221; ann. 1229)
- Issue: Alfonso of Bigorre
- House: Castilian House of Ivrea
- Father: Alfonso VIII of Castile
- Mother: Eleanor of England

Eleanor of Castile (1200—1244) was Queen of Aragon by her marriage to King James I of Aragon.

== Queenship ==
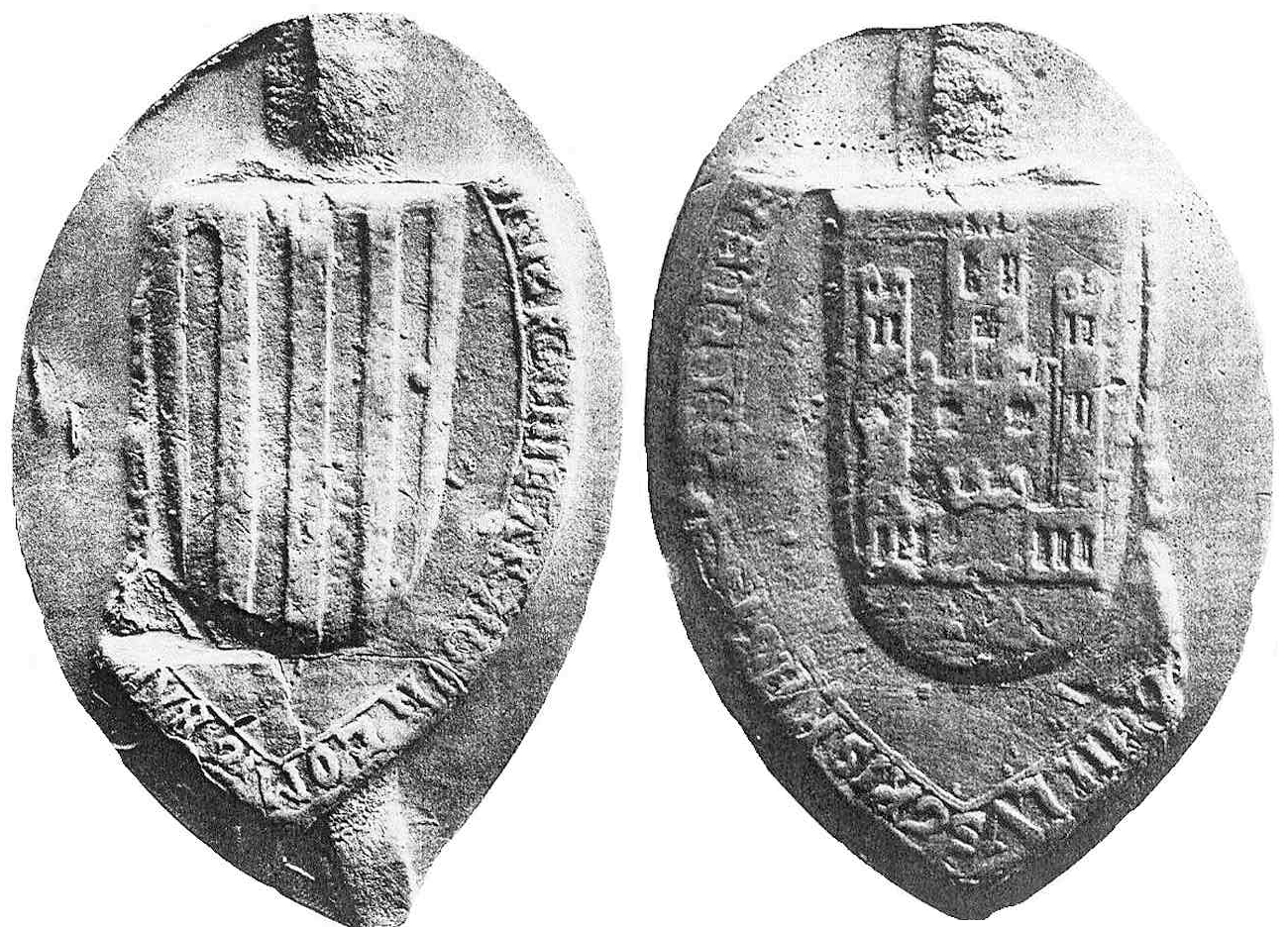
Eleanorʻs seal

Eleanor was the daughter of Alfonso VIII of Castile and Eleanor of England. In 1221 at Ágreda, Eleanor married King James I of Aragon; she was nineteen and he was fourteen. The next six years of James's reign were full of rebellions on the part of the nobles. By the Peace of Alcalá of 31 March 1227, the nobles and the king came to terms. The couple had a son, Alfonso, who married Constance of Béarn. Eleanor's marriage to James was annulled in 1230, and the agreement prohibited her from remarrying. Their son, Alfonso, was declared legitimate, but he pre-deceased James.

== Monastic life ==
Eleanor became a nun after the annulment. She went to the Abbey of Santa María la Real de Las Huelgas to join her elder sister Berengaria who had retired from ruling Castile and Leon, and their other sister Constance, who was long a nun there. All three sisters died there, Constance in 1243, Eleanor in 1244, and Berengaria in 1246. All are buried in the abbey.

== Burial ==
Eleanor was buried in the Monastery of Las Huelgas in Burgos. Her remains were deposited in a tomb which is now located in the Nave of Santa Catarina of the Gospel, and lies between the tomb containing the remains of Philip, son of Sancho IV and María de Molina, which is placed to the right, and the tomb containing the remains of Peter, brother of Philip.

Coat of arms of Eleanor of Castile

During work on the monastery in the middle of the twentieth century it was found that the remains of Eleanor, mummified and in good condition, lay in her tomb of limestone; the roof had two slopes and was smooth, although in the past was polychrome. Her coffin was wooden and devoid of cover, although there were still remnants of its shell and lysed cross made of studded gold braid, as well as clothing that was buried with the queen, among which highlighted three brocade garments in Arabic, which Manuel Gómez Moreno considered similar to those found in the grave of her grandnephew Philip.

== Sources ==
- Bisson, Thomas N. (1991). The Medieval Crown of Aragon: A Short History. Oxford University Press.
- Linehan, Peter (2011). Spain, 1157-1300: A Particle Inheritance. Wiley-Blackwell.
- Shadis, Miriam (2010). Berenguela of Castile (1180–1246) and Political Women in the High Middle Ages. Palgrave Macmillan. ISBN 978-0-312-23473-7.

Eleanor of Castile Castilian House of Ivrea Cadet branch of the Anscarids Born: circa 1202 Died: circa 1244
Royal titles
Vacant Title last held by Marie of Montpellier	Queen consort of Aragon; 1221–1229	Vacant Title next held by Violant of Hungary
