= Abbey of Santa María la Real de Las Huelgas =

Coordinates: 42°20′09.96″N 3°43′12.72″W

- Monasterio de Santa María la Real de Las Huelgas (Spanish)
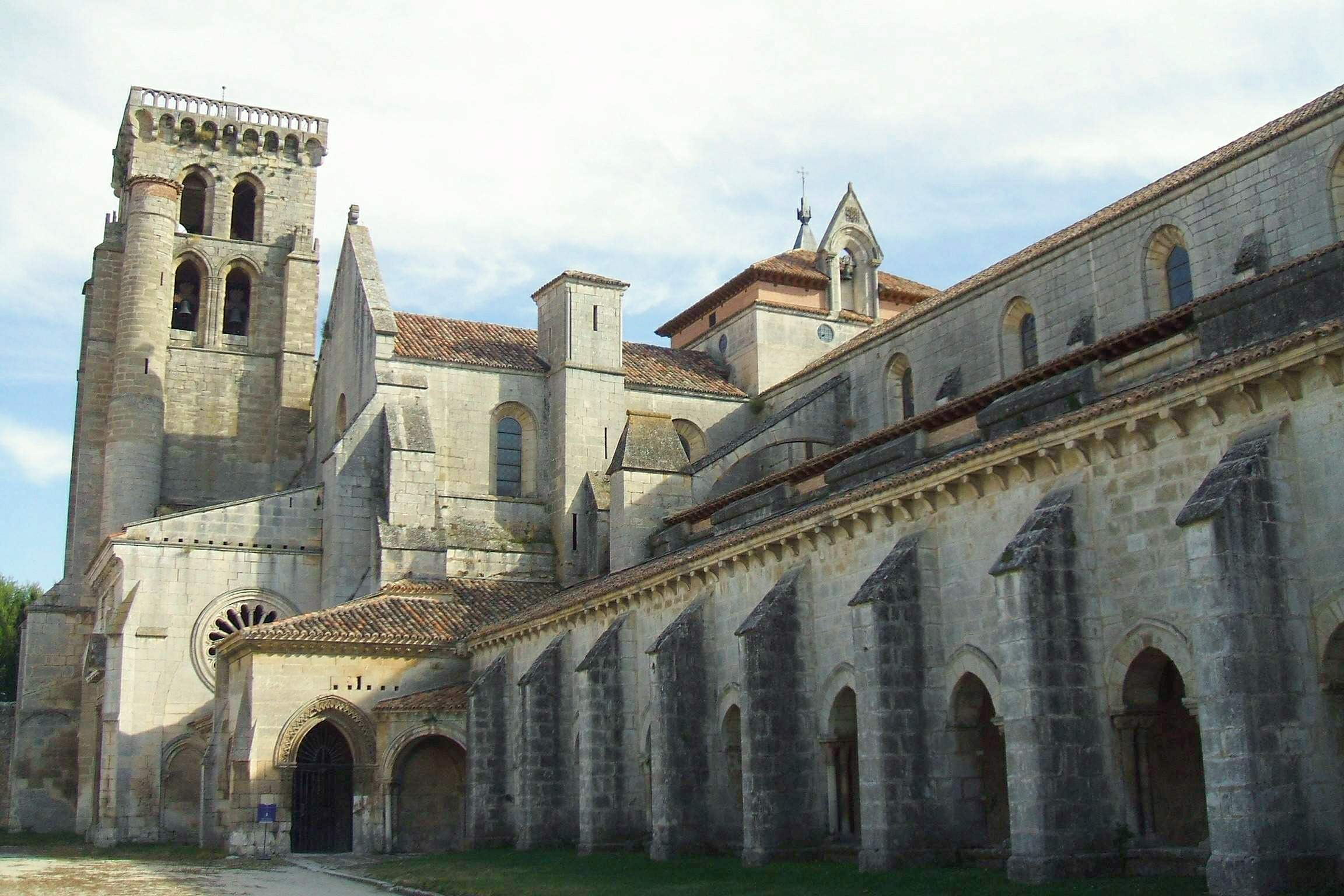
- Façade of the monastery

- Location within Spain
- Location: Burgos, Castile and León, Spain

History
- Founded: 1187
- Built: 12th-13th centuries

Site notes
- Architectural styles: Romanesque, Almohad, Gothic
- Governing body: Cistercian nuns

Spanish Cultural Heritage
- Official name: Monasterio de Santa María la Real de las Huelgas
- Type: Non-movable
- Criteria: Monument
- Designated: June 3, 1931
- Reference no.: RI-51-0000453

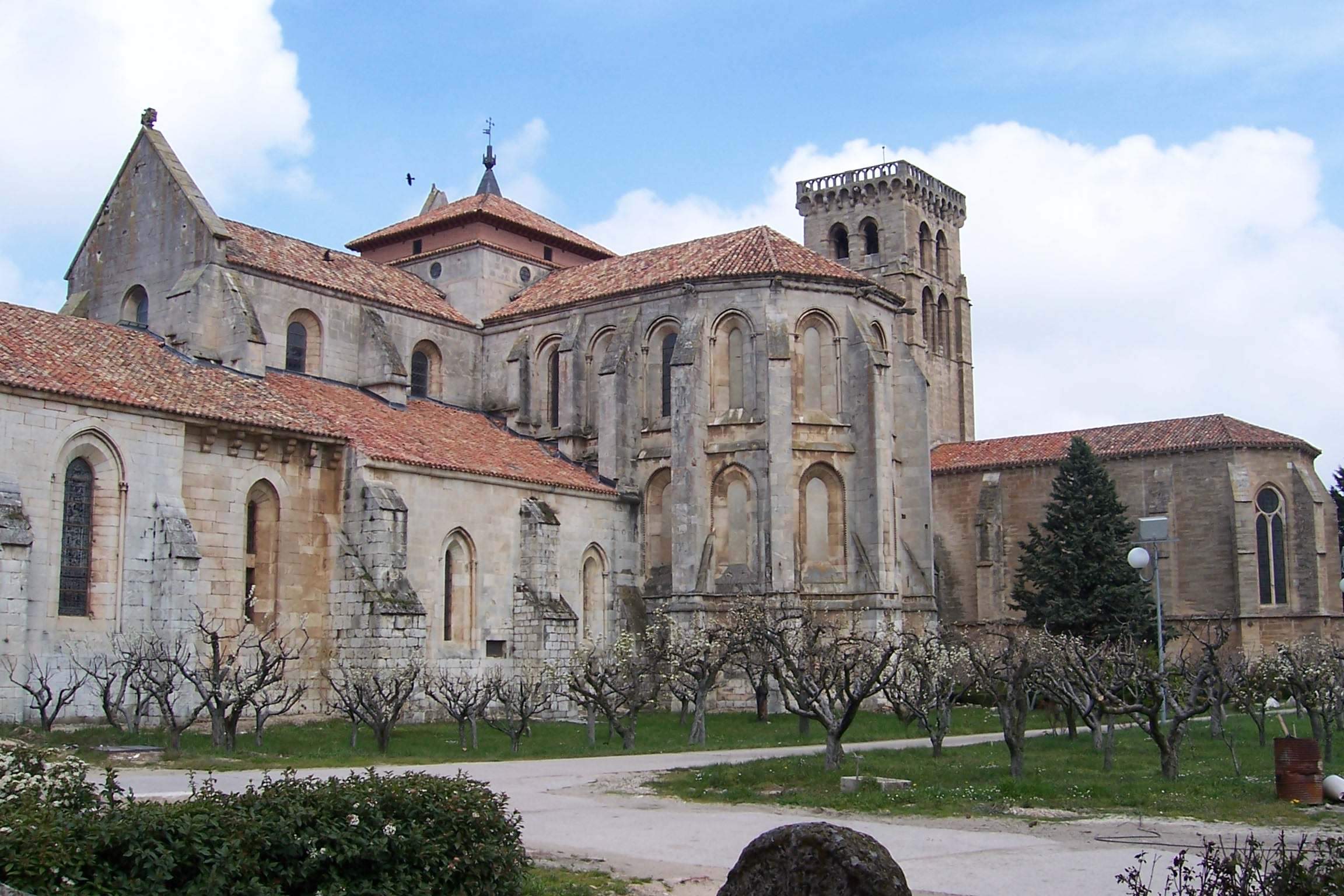
Ambulatory and gardens of the monastery.

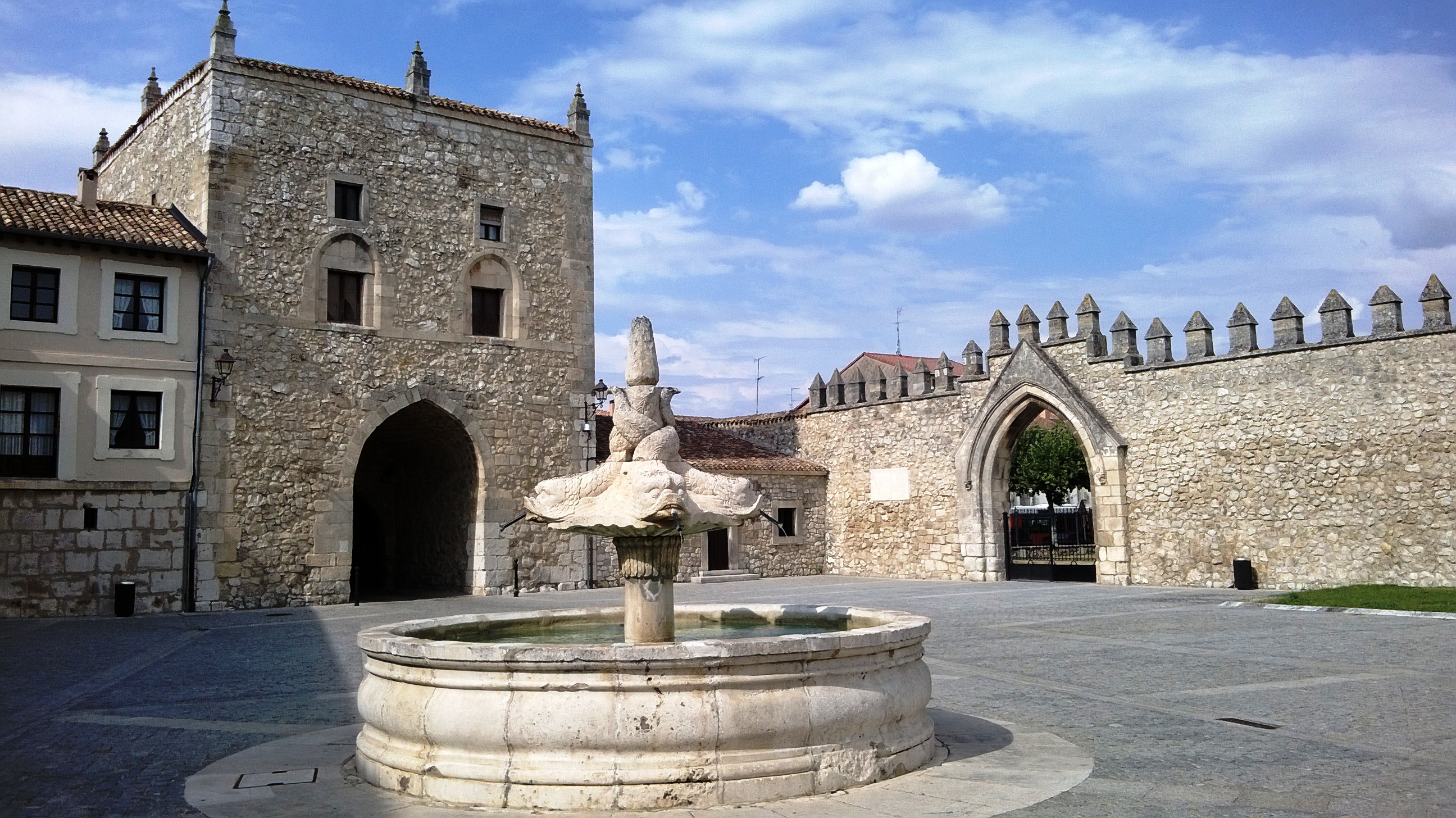
Tower of Alfonso XI, part of the former City Walls, and belongs to Las Huelgas.

The Abbey of Santa María la Real de Las Huelgas is a monastery of Cistercian nuns located approximately 1.5 km west of the city of Burgos in Spain. The word huelgas, which usually refers to "labour strikes" in modern Spanish, refers in this case to land which had been left fallow. Historically, the monastery has been the site of many weddings of royal families, both foreign and Spanish, including that of Edward I of England to Eleanor of Castile in 1254, for example. The defensive tower of the abbey is also the birthplace of King Peter of Castile.

== History ==
On 2 January 1187, Pope Clement III issued a papal bull authorising the founding of a monastery dedicated to the Virgin Mary. In June of the same year, Alfonso VIII of Castile, at the behest of his wife, Eleanor of England, daughter of Henry II of England and Eleanor of Aquitaine granted the foundational charter stipulating that the monastery was to be governed by the Cistercian Order.

Until the 16th century, it enjoyed many royal privileges granted to it by the king, including exemption from taxes, the lordship of many villages and territories (governed by the monastery's abbess), and the possession of many of the royal families' valued personal items, most of them religious. It is even claimed that, until the Council of Trent, the abbess was able to hear confession and give absolution, like a priest.

In 1199, the founders formally delivered the monastery to the nuns and added a clause pursuant to which the monastery was to be the burial place of the royal family. Constance, the youngest daughter of Alfonso, joined the Cistercians there. She was the first known as the Lady of Las Huelgas. This position was held as well by other women from the royal family, including her niece Constance and her grand-niece Berengaria, and maintained the close connection between the community and their royal patrons. Queen Eleanor and Queen Berengaria were both documented as supporting and being involved with the abbey. While members of the royal family were secular leaders of the monastery, abbesses such as Sancha Garcia were spiritual authorities.

Alfonso VIII, who was himself to be buried at Las Huelgas, along with his wife, Eleanor, created the affiliated Royal Hospital, with all its dependencies, subject to the abbess. The hospital was founded to feed and care for the poor pilgrims along the Camino de Santiago. Donations made to sustain the hospital noted the key role that Eleanor played in its founding and maintenance, and she made many donations in honor of her deceased son Ferdinand.

A community of lay brothers developed to help the nuns in their care of the hospital's patients, who became known as the Brothers Hospitallers of Burgos. There were never more than a dozen of them, but they formed an independent religious order in 1474. The Brothers survived as an order until 1587, when their order was suppressed and they were again placed under the authority of the abbess.

The abbess of the monastery was, by the favor of the king, invested with almost royal prerogatives, and exercised an unlimited secular authority over more than fifty villages. Like secular lords, she held her own courts, in civil and criminal cases, and, like bishops, she granted dimissorial letters for ordination, and issued licenses authorizing priests within the territory of her abbatial jurisdiction to hear confessions, to preach, and to engage in pastoral care. She was privileged also to confirm the abbesses of other monasteries, to impose censures, and to convoke synods. At a general chapter of the Cistercians held in 1189, she was made Abbess General of the Order for the Kingdom of León and Castile, with the privilege of convoking annually a general chapter at Burgos. The abbess of Las Huelgas retained her ancient prerogatives up to the time of the Council of Trent in the 16th century.

Currently, the monastic community, which at present numbers 36, is part of the Spanish Congregation of St. Bernard, a reform movement of Cistercian nuns, which arose during the 16th and 17th centuries. Due to this, they are also commonly referred to as "Bernadines". The nuns of this Congregation would follow a more exact observance of the Rule of St. Benedict than other Cistercian houses, with frequent and lengthy fasts, and celebrating the Divine Office about 2:00 A.M. The nuns support themselves through the decoration of porcelain items, making rosaries and providing laundry services for local hotels.

This abbey has founded a daughter house in Peru, the Monastery of the Most Holy Trinity, which is located in the agricultural Lurín District, on the outskirts of the Lima Metropolitan Area. The monastery has about ten professed nuns, and several candidates in various stages of formation. They support themselves by making cakes and jams, for which they use the produce of their own gardens.

== Cultural heritage ==
The monastery is open to the public. Visits are administered not by the monastic community, but by the Spanish heritage organisation Patrimonio Nacional, which maintains the property as a Spanish royal site.

=== Textiles ===
The monastery houses the Museo de Ricas Telas, a showcase of medieval textiles taken from the many royal tombs in the convent. Also on display is the tapestry that covered the tent of the Almohad caliph Al Nasir, known to the Christians as Miramamolin. This tapestry was seized by the victorious Christians at the Battle of Las Navas de Tolosa on July 16, 1212. When Sancho VII of Navarre's men drove through an enchained circle of African slaves guarding Miramamolin's tent, the caliph fled with great haste, leaving this tapestry along with several other prizes of war behind for the exultant Spanish.

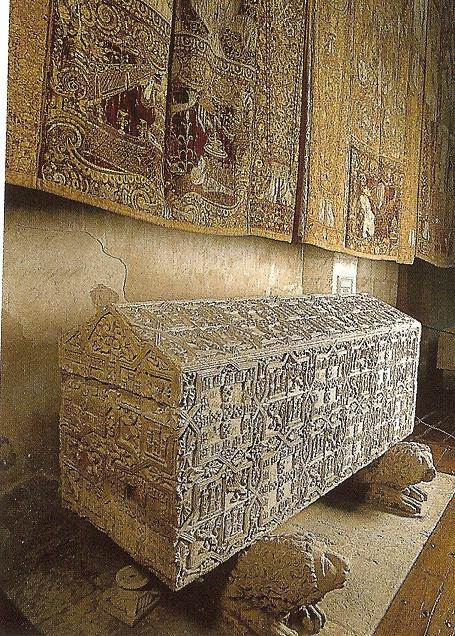
One of the many royal tombs at Las Huelgas

=== Musical heritage ===
"Victimae Paschali Laudes"
A recording by a soprano of this sequence found in the Codex Las Huelgas and other manuscripts.

Las Huelgas preserves a 14th-century music manuscript, the Codex Las Huelgas. It contains monophonic and polyphonic music which is assumed to have been performed by the nuns. Some of the music is not found in any other source.

== Burials ==
- Henry I of Castile
- Eleanor of England, Queen of Castile
- Alfonso VIII of Castile
- Berengaria of Castile
- Blanche of Portugal (1259–1321)
- Eleanor of Castile (died 1244)
- Philip of Castile, Lord of Cabrera and Ribera
- Peter of Castile, Lord of Cameros
- Blanche of Castile (1319–75)

== Old images ==
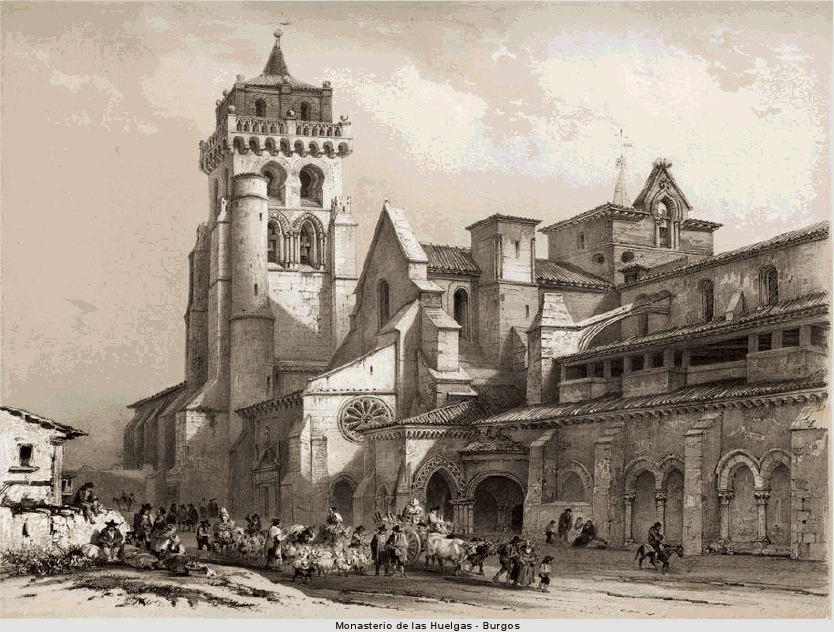
Monastery of Santa María la Real de las Huelgas by Jenaro Pérez Villaamil and Louis-Julien Jacottet in 1842-1850.

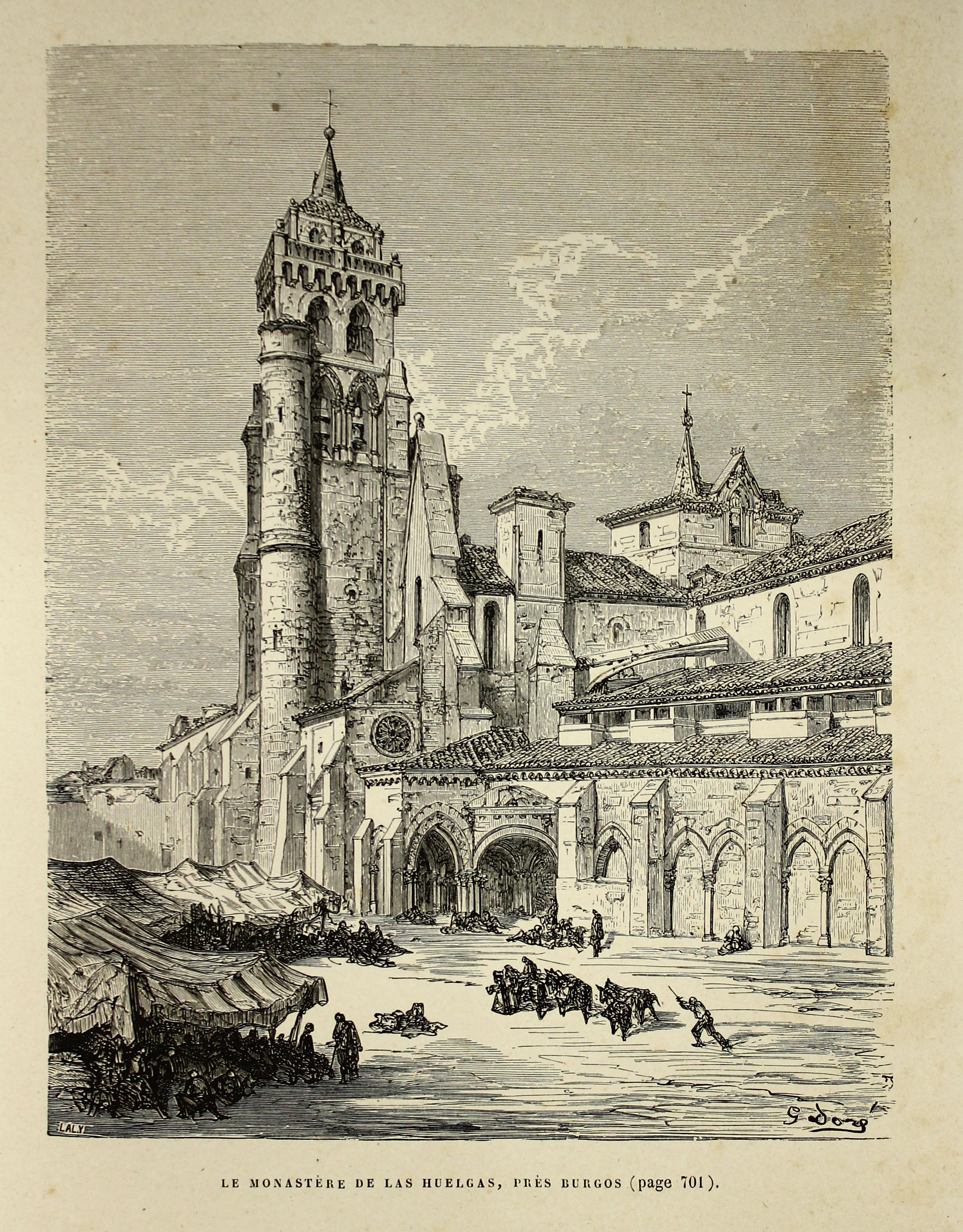
Le Monastére de las Huelgas, près Burgos by Gustave Doré in 1874.

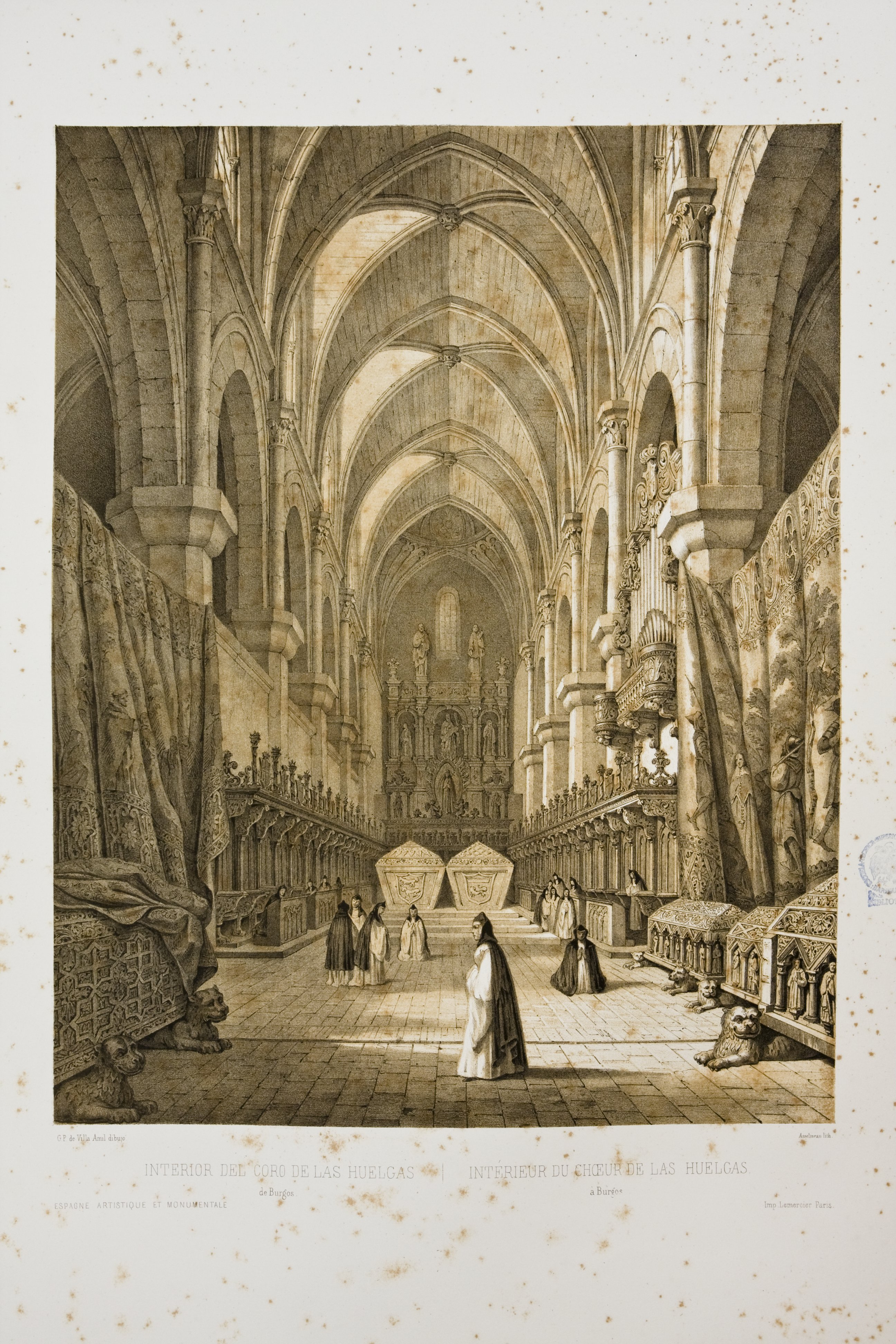
Chorus's interior of Las Huelgas by Jenaro Pérez Villaamil and Léon-Auguste Asselineau in 1850.

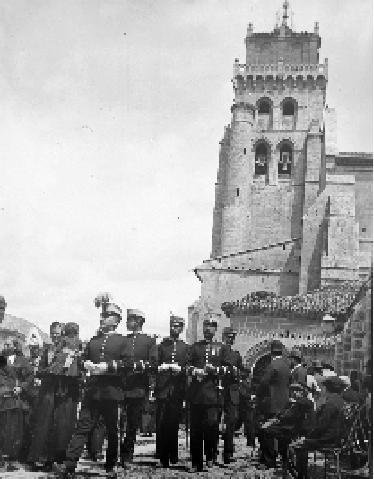
View of the monastery during Fiesta of El Curpillos's celebration. Late-19th century.

== See also ==
- Codex Las Huelgas
- High medieval domes

== Bibliography ==
- Baury, Ghislain (2012). Les religieuses de Castille. Patronage aristocratique et ordre cistercien, XIIe-XIIIe siècles. Presses Universitaires de Rennes.
- Cockerill, Sara (2014). Eleanor of Castile: the shadow queen. Stroud: Amberley. ISBN 9781445635897. OL 28551635M.
- Gayoso, Andrea (2000). The Lady of Las Huelgas: A Royal Abbey and Its Patronage.
- Herrero Sanz, María Jesús (2012). Guía Santa María la Real de Huelgas (in Spanish). Madrid: Reales Sitios de España. Patrimonio Nacional. ISBN 978-84-7120-337-3.
- Shadis, Miriam (2010). Berenguela of Castile (1180–1246) and Political Women in the High Middle Ages. Palgrave Macmillan. ISBN 978-0-312-23473-7.
