= Alfonso VIII of Castile =

King of Castile and Toledo from 1158 to 1214

Alfonso VIII
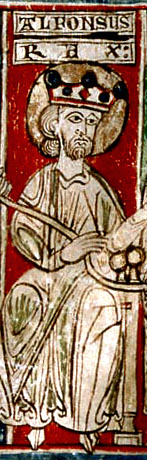
- Miniature detail of Alfonso VIII in the Tumbo menor de Castilla, 13th century

King of Castile and Toledo
- Reign: 31 August 1158 – 5 October 1214
- Predecessor: Sancho III
- Successor: Henry I
- Born: 11 November 1155; Soria
- Died: 5 October 1214 (aged 58); Gutierre-Muñoz
- Burial: Abbey of Santa María la Real de Las Huelgas
- Spouse: Eleanor of England (m. 1170)
- Issue among others...: Berengaria the Great; Urraca, Queen of Portugal; Blanche, Queen of France; Ferdinand; Eleanor, Queen of Aragon; Henry I of Castile
- House: Castilian House of Ivrea
- Father: Sancho III of Castile
- Mother: Blanche of Navarre

Alfonso VIII (11 November 1155 – 5 October 1214), called the Noble (El Noble) or the one of Las Navas (el de las Navas), was King of Castile from 1158 to his death and King of Toledo. After having suffered a great defeat with his own army at Alarcos against the Almohads in 1195, he led the coalition of Christian princes and foreign crusaders who broke the power of the Almohads in the Battle of Las Navas de Tolosa in 1212, an event which marked the arrival of a tide of Christian supremacy on the Iberian Peninsula.

His reign saw the domination of Castile over León and, by his alliance with Aragon, he drew those two spheres of Christian Iberia into close connection.

== Regency and civil war ==
Alfonso was born to Sancho III of Castile and Blanche, in Soria on 11 November 1155. He was named after his grandfather Alfonso VII of León and Castile, who divided his kingdoms between his sons. This division set the stage for conflict in the family until the kingdoms were re-united by Alfonso VIII's grandson, Ferdinand III of Castile.

His early life resembled that of other medieval kings. His father died in 1158. Though proclaimed king when only two years of age, Alfonso was regarded as merely nominal by the unruly nobles to whom a minority was convenient. Immediately, Castile was plunged into conflicts between the various noble houses vying for ascendancy in the inevitable regency. The devotion of a squire of his household, who carried him on the pommel of his saddle to the stronghold of San Esteban de Gormaz, saved him from falling into the hands of the contending factions. The noble houses of Lara and Castro both claimed the regency, as did the boy's uncle, Ferdinand II of León. In 1159 the young Alfonso was put briefly in the custody of García Garcés de Aza, who was not wealthy enough to support him. In March 1160 the Castro and Lara met at the Battle of Lobregal and the Castro were victorious, but the guardianship of Alfonso and the regency fell to Manrique Pérez de Lara.

Alfonso was put in the custody of the loyal village Ávila. At barely fifteen, he began restoring his kingdom to order. It was only by surprise that he recovered his capital Toledo from the hands of the Laras.

== Marriage and foreign relations ==
During the regency, his uncle Sancho VI of Navarre took advantage of the chaos and the king's minority to seize lands along the border, including much of La Rioja. In 1170, Alfonso sent an embassy to Bordeaux to Henry II of England and Eleanor of Aquitaine to seek the hand of their daughter Eleanor. The marriage treaty helped provide Alfonso with a powerful ally against his uncle. In 1176, Alfonso asked his father-in-law to arbitrate the disputed border territories. While Alfonso received back much that had been taken from him, he had to pay significant monetary compensation.

In 1186, he recovered part of La Rioja from the Kingdom of Navarre.

In 1187, Alfonso negotiated with Frederick I, Holy Roman Emperor, who was seeking to marry his son Conrad to Alfonso's eldest child and heiress, Berengaria. In April 1188, they agreed on a treaty in Seligenstadt, which made clear that she was the heiress of Castile after any sons of Alfonso and that Conrad would only co-rule as her spouse. That became relevant in her ultimate succession to the throne even though the marriage to Conrad was never consummated and later annulled. The treaty also documented traditional rights and obligations between the sovereign and the nobles in Castile. In July 1188, Alfonso convened his court in Carrión de los Condes to allow the nobles to review and ratify the treaty. At that court, Alfonso knighted both Conrad and Alfonso IX of León, who would ultimately marry Berengaria. The younger Alfonso had come to seek the support and acknowledgement of his ascent to the throne of León from his older cousin. The elder Alfonso granted that in exchange for acknowledgement that the king of Castile was overlord of the king of León.

The relationship between the cousins Alfonso continued to be filled with conflict. In 1194, the papal legate negotiated a treaty between them to end the conflict temporarily. However, after Castile was defeated at the Battle of Alarcos, Alfonso IX seized the opportunity to attack his cousin again. Castille defended itself with papal support. A more lasting peace was achieved finally by the marriage of Alfonso VIII's daughter Berengaria to Alfonso IX in 1197. The annulment of this marriage by the pope drove Alfonso IX to attack his cousin again in 1204, but treaties made in 1205, 1207, and 1209 forced him to concede further territories and rights. The treaty in 1207 is the first existing public document in the Castilian dialect.

Around 1200 when his brother-in-law John was on the English throne, Alfonso began to claim that Gascony was part of Eleanor's dowry, though there was nothing in the marriage treaty to indicate this. In 1205, he invaded Gascony, hoping to make good on his claim. By 1208, he gave up on the venture, though his heirs would come back to this claim generations later.

== Reconquista ==
In 1174, he ceded Uclés to the Order of Santiago and afterwards this became the order's principal seat. From Uclés, he began a campaign which culminated in the Conquest of Cuenca in 1177. The city surrendered on 21 September, the feast of Saint Matthew, ever afterwards celebrated by the citizens of the town.

Alfonso took the initiative to ally all Christian kingdoms of the peninsula—Navarre, León, Portugal, and Aragon—against the Almohads. By the Treaty of Cazola of 1179, the zones of expansion of each kingdom were defined.

After founding Plasencia (Cáceres) in 1186, he embarked on a major initiative to unite the Castilian nobility around the Reconquista.

In 1195, after the treaty with the Almohads was broken, he came to the defence of Alarcos on the river Guadiana, then the principal Castilian town in the region. At the subsequent Battle of Alarcos, he was roundly defeated by the caliph Abu Yusuf Yaqub al-Mansur. The Almohads quickly commenced the reoccupation of the surrounding territory, with Calatrava falling first. For the next seventeen years, the frontier between Moor and Castilian was fixed in the hill country just outside Toledo.

Finally, in 1212, through the mediation of Pope Innocent III, a crusade was called against the Almohads. Castilians under Alfonso, Aragonese and Catalans under Peter II, Navarrese under Sancho VII, and Franks under the archbishop of Narbonne, Arnaud Amalric, all flocked to the effort. The military orders also lent their support. Calatrava first, then Alarcos, and finally Benavente were captured before a final battle was fought at Las Navas de Tolosa near Santa Elena on 16 July. The caliph Muhammad al-Nasir was routed and Almohad power broken.

== Cultural legacy ==
Alfonso was the founder of the first Spanish university, a studium generale at Palencia, which, however, did not survive him. His court also served as an important instrument for Spanish cultural achievement. Alfonso and his wife Eleanor of England were the first to make the Alcázar of Segovia as their residence when this fortress was still at its early stages.

Alfonso died at Gutierre-Muñoz and was succeeded by his surviving son, Henry I.

Alfonso was the subject for Lion Feuchtwanger's novel Die Jüdin von Toledo (The Jewess of Toledo), in which is narrated an affair with a Jewish subject in medieval Toledo in a time when Spain was known to be the land of tolerance and learning for Jews, Christians, and Muslims. The titular Jewish woman of the novel is based on Alfonso's paramour, Rahel la Fermosa. Scholars continue to debate the historical truth of this relationship. The 1919 film The Jewess of Toledo by Franz Höbling is also based on this relationship.

== Children ==
With Eleanor of England, Alfonso had 11 children:

Name	Birth	Death	Notes
Berengaria	Burgos, 1 January/ June 1180	Las Huelgas near Burgos, 8 November 1246	Married firstly in Seligenstadt on 23 April 1188 with Duke Conrad II of Swabia, but the union (only by contract and never solemnized) was later annulled. Married in Valladolid between 1/16 December 1197 with King Alfonso IX of León as his second wife. After their marriage was dissolved on grounds of consanguinity in 1204, she returned to her homeland and became regent of her minor brother King Henry I. Queen of Castile in her own right after the death of Henry I in 1217, quickly abdicated in favor of her son Ferdinand III of Castile who would re-unite the kingdoms of Castile and León.
Sancho	Burgos, 5 April 1181	26 July 1181	Heir of the throne since his birth, died aged three months.
Sancha	20/28 March 1182	3 February 1184/ 16 October 1185	Died in infancy.
Henry	1184	1184?	Heir of the throne since his birth, died either shortly after being born or in infancy. His existence is disputed among sources.
Urraca	1186/ 28 May 1187	Coimbra, 3 November 1220	Queen of Afonso II of Portugal
Blanche	Palencia, 4 March 1188	Paris, 27 November 1252	Married to Louis VIII of France
Ferdinand	Cuenca, 29 September 1189	Madrid, 14 October 1211	Heir of the throne since his birth. On whose behalf Diego of Acebo and the future Saint Dominic travelled to Denmark in 1203 to secure a bride. Ferdinand was returning through the San Vicente mountains from a campaign against the Muslims when he contracted a fever and died.
Mafalda	Plasencia, 1191	Salamanca, 1204	Betrothed in 1204 to Infante Ferdinand of Leon, eldest son of Alfonso IX and stepson of her oldest sister.
Eleanor	1200	Las Huelgas, 1244	Married in Ágreda on 6 February 1221 with James I of Aragon.
Constance	c. 1202	Las Huelgas, 1243	A nun at the Cistercian monastery of Santa María la Real at Las Huelgas in 1217, she became known as the Lady of Las Huelgas, a title shared with later royal family members who joined the community.
Henry	Valladolid, 14 April 1204	Palencia, 6 June 1217	Only surviving son, he succeeded his father in 1214 aged ten under the regency firstly of his mother and later his oldest sister. He was killed when he was struck by a tile falling from a roof.

Through his daughters, Berengaria and Blanche, he was the grandfather of two monarchs who became saints of the Roman Church.

== Notes ==
Alfonso VIII of Castile Castilian House of Ivrea Cadet branch of the House of Ivrea Born: 11 November 1155 Died: 5 October 1214
Regnal titles
Preceded by Sancho III	King of Castile; 1158–1214	Succeeded by Henry I
