= Villalba de los Alcores =

Coordinates: 41°52′N 4°51′W

Villalba de los Alcores, Spain
- Coat of arms

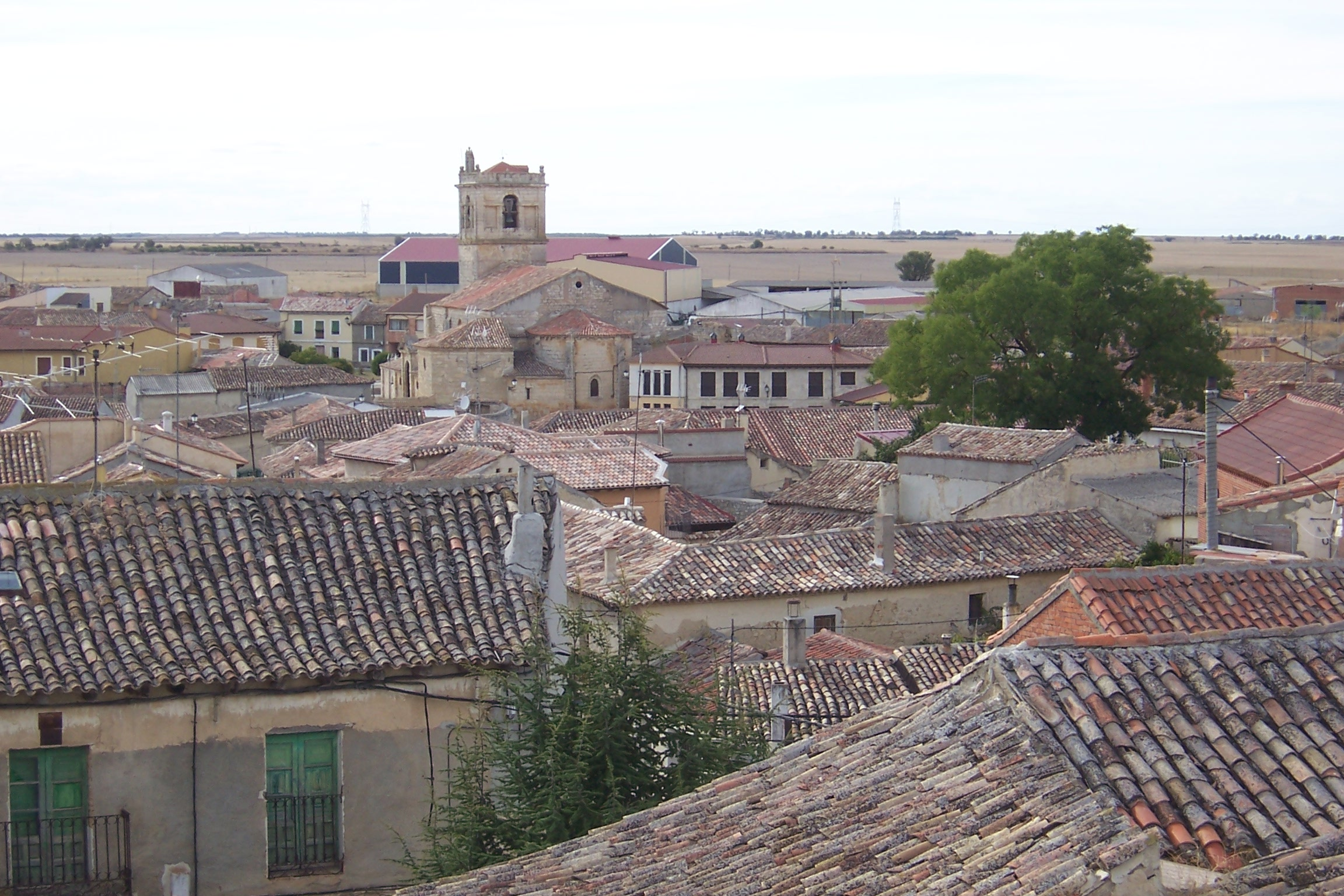
- Panoramic view.
- Country: Spain
- Autonomous community: Castile and León
- Province: Valladolid
- Municipality: Villalba de los Alcores

Area
  - Total: 101.7 km^{2} (39.3 sq mi)
- Elevation: 849 m (2,785 ft)

Population (2025-01-01)
  - Total: 383
  - Density: 3.77/km^{2} (9.75/sq mi)
- Time zone: UTC+1 (CET)
  - Summer (DST): UTC+2 (CEST)

Villalba de los Alcores is a municipality located in the province of Valladolid, Castile and León, Spain.

According to the 2004 census (INE), the municipality had a population of 537 inhabitants.
