= Mafalda of Portugal =

Portuguese infanta, saint, and queen of Castile (c.1195–1256)

- Lady of Arouca
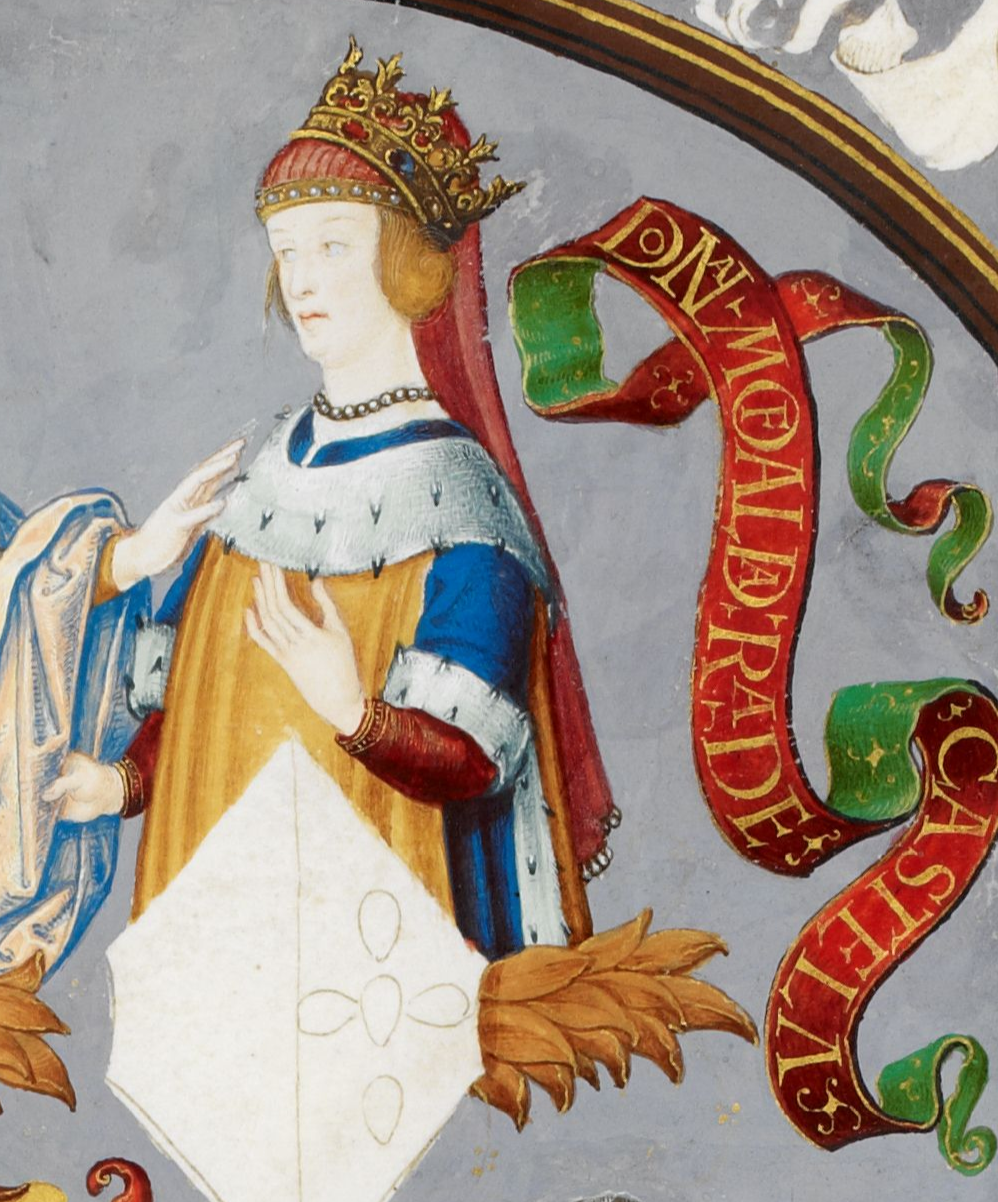
- Mafalda in Genealogy of the Kings of Portugal (António de Holanda, 1530–1534)

Queen consort of Castile
- Tenure: 1215–1216
- Born: c. 1195; Kingdom of Portugal
- Died: 1 May 1256 (aged 61); Rio Tinto, Gondomar, Kingdom of Portugal
- Burial: Arouca Abbey, Arouca, Porto, Portugal
- Spouse: Henry I of Castile (m. 1215; ann. 1216)
- House: Portuguese House of Burgundy
- Father: Sancho I
- Mother: Dulce of Aragon
- Religion: Catholic

Blessed Mafalda of Portugal O.Cist
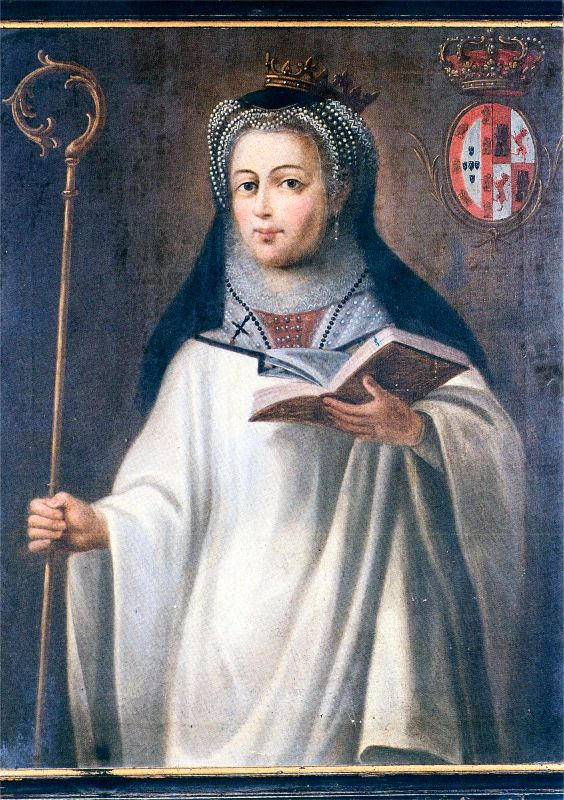
- Anonymous image of Mafalda, depicting her dressed in her royal robes covered by a monastic cowl, bearing a crozier in her right hand, indicative of her position as an abbess, found in the gallery of Arouca Abbey (1740)

Virgin
- Venerated in: Catholic Church
- Beatified: 27 June 1792, Rome, Papal States by Pope Pius VI
- Feast: 2 May

Infanta Mafalda of Portugal (c. 1195 – 1 May 1256 in Rio Tinto, Gondomar; Portuguese pronunciation: [mɐˈfaldɐ]) was a Portuguese infanta (princess) and later Queen consort of Castile for a brief period. She was the second youngest daughter of King Sancho I of Portugal and Dulce of Aragon. She became queen consort during her brief marriage to the 10-year-old Henry I of Castile.

Upon the dissolution of the marriage, Mafalda returned to her homeland. She chose to become a Cistercian nun and became noted for the holiness of her life. She was beatified in the Catholic Church five centuries after her death.

== Life ==
=== Early life ===
Mafalda of Portugal was born around 1195, the daughter of King Sancho I of Portugal and his queen, Dulce of Aragon. On the death of her father, Mafalda, under the provisions of his will, was to receive the Seia Castle and the remaining portion of the municipality as well as all income produced there. Furthermore, she was granted the right to use the title of queen. This created a conflict with her brother Afonso II O Gordo, who, wanting centralized power, hindered his sister from receiving the titles and the corresponding rights. Afonso feared that something similar could happen with his two sisters, Teresa and Sancha, and their eventual heirs, creating a problem of sovereignty that could come to divide the country. Much of the Portuguese nobles sided with Mafalda and her sisters, but they were defeated. On the death of Afonso II, his son Sancho II granted some lands and castles to his aunts but he made them renounce the title of princess-queen. The final peace came in 1223.

=== Marriage ===
In 1215, a political marriage was arranged between Mafalda and her young cousin Henry I of Castile. As he was about ten years old, the marriage was never consummated, and it was dissolved the following year on grounds of consanguinity. She then returned to Portugal.

=== Monastic life ===
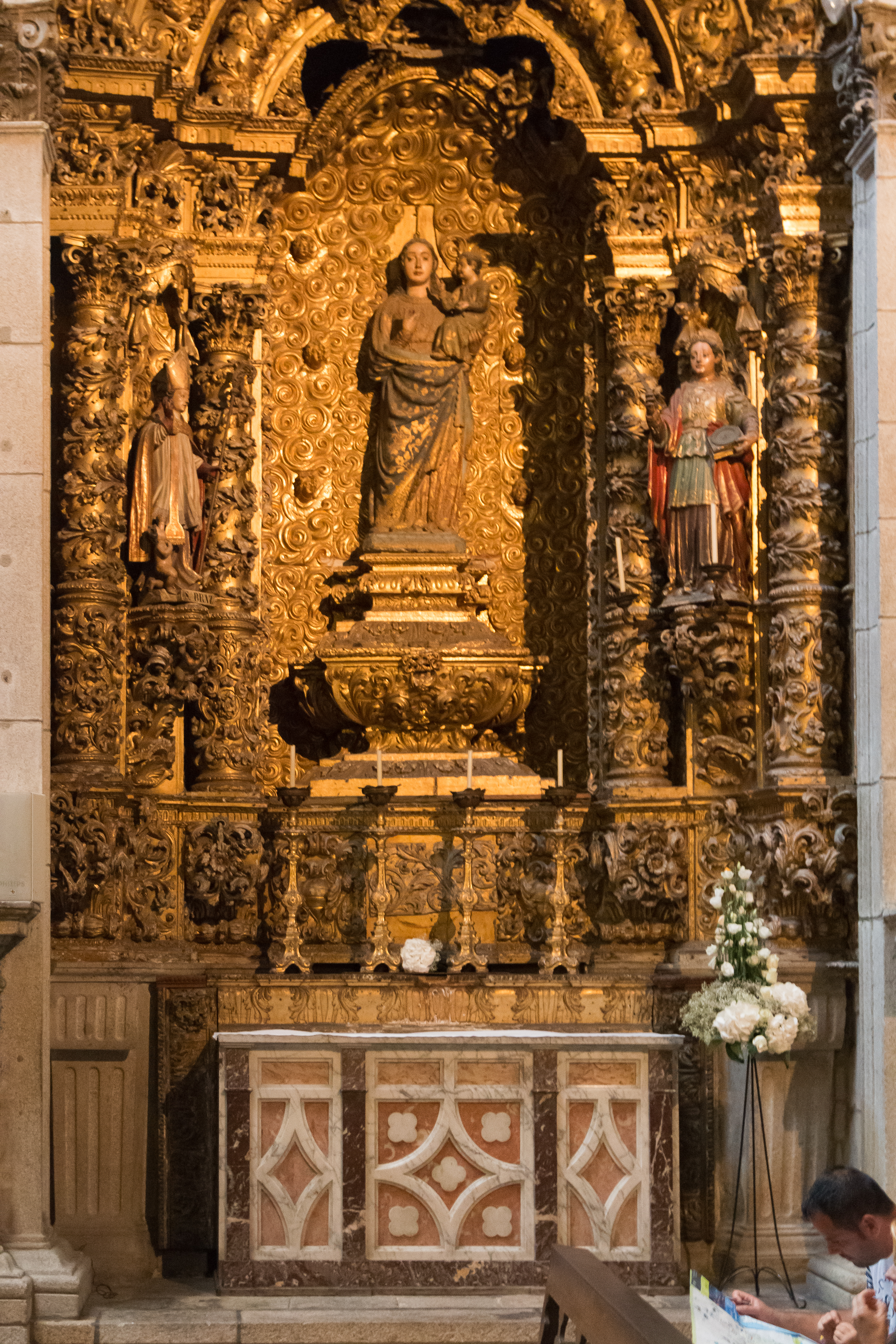
Altar of Our Lady of Silva, Porto

In 1220, Mafalda chose not to marry again and became a nun at the Abbey of Arouca, though she was granted a special dispensation to retain control of her inheritance. Her sisters Sancha and Teresa also joined the convent. Mafalda later became abbess of the community, then one of Benedictine nuns, and in 1226 had her request to transfer the abbey to the Cistercian Order granted by the pope.

Mafalda had a great devotion to Our Lady of Silva and made substantial donations to her shrine in Porto. She also had a hospice for travelers built as well as a number of bridges, churches, monasteries, and hospitals. She helped to establish her own abbey as a major religious center in the region, a status that endured for centuries.

Returning from a pilgrimage to the shrine of Our Lady of Silva, she fell ill at Rio Tinto, Gondomar, and died at the monastery of Cistercians monks there on 1 May 1256. In 1616, wanting to return her body to Arouca as part of the process of her possible canonization, observers found her remains not to have deteriorated, which generated an even stronger public devotion to her. She was beatified in 1792 by Pope Pius VI. Her feast day is celebrated on 2 May.

Royal titles
Preceded by Eleanor of England	Queen consort of Castile; 1215–1216	Succeeded by Elisabeth of Swabia
