= Gutierre-Muñoz =

- Municipality
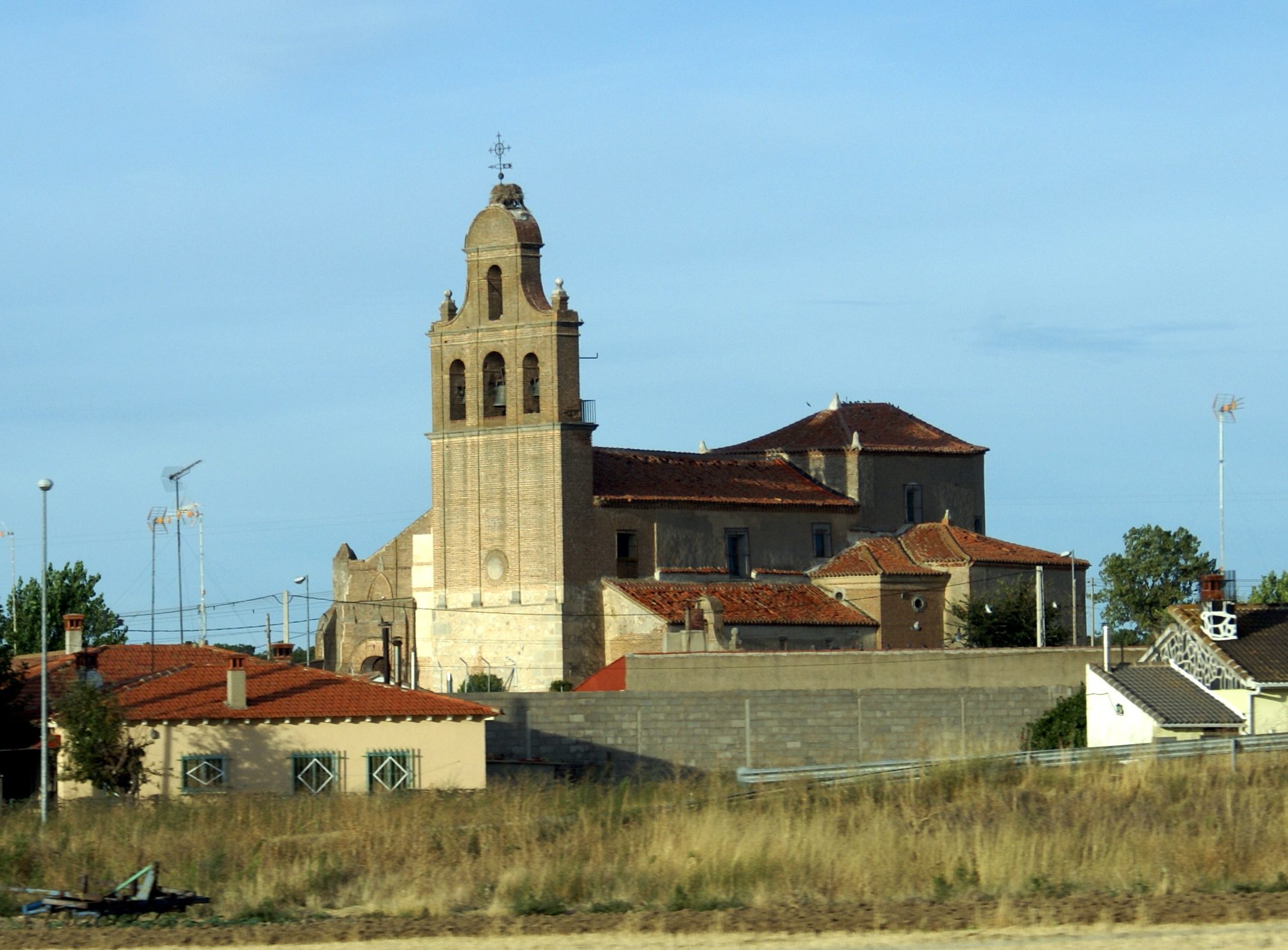
- Gutierre-Muñoz Church.

- Coat of arms

- Location in Spain. Gutierre-Muñoz (Spain)
- Coordinates: 40°59′00″N 4°38′19″W
- Country: Spain
- Autonomous community: Castile and León
- Province: Ávila
- Municipality: Gutierre-Muñoz

Area
  - Total: 22 km^{2} (8.5 sq mi)

Population (2025-01-01)
  - Total: 63
  - Density: 2.9/km^{2} (7.4/sq mi)
- Time zone: UTC+1 (CET)
  - Summer (DST): UTC+2 (CEST)
- Website: Official website

Gutierre-Muñoz is a municipality located in the province of Ávila, Castile and León, Spain.

== Population ==
Historical population
Year	Pop.	±% p.a.
2023	61	—
2024	64	+4.92%
2025	63	−1.56%
Source: INE
