= Sancho of Portugal =

Sancho of Portugal may refer to:

- Sancho I of Portugal, nicknamed the Populator, (1154 - 1212)
- Sancho II of Portugal, nicknamed "the Pious" and "the Caped" or "the Capuched", (1209 - 1248)
