= Mécia Lopes de Haro =

Queen of Portugal from 1246 to 1248

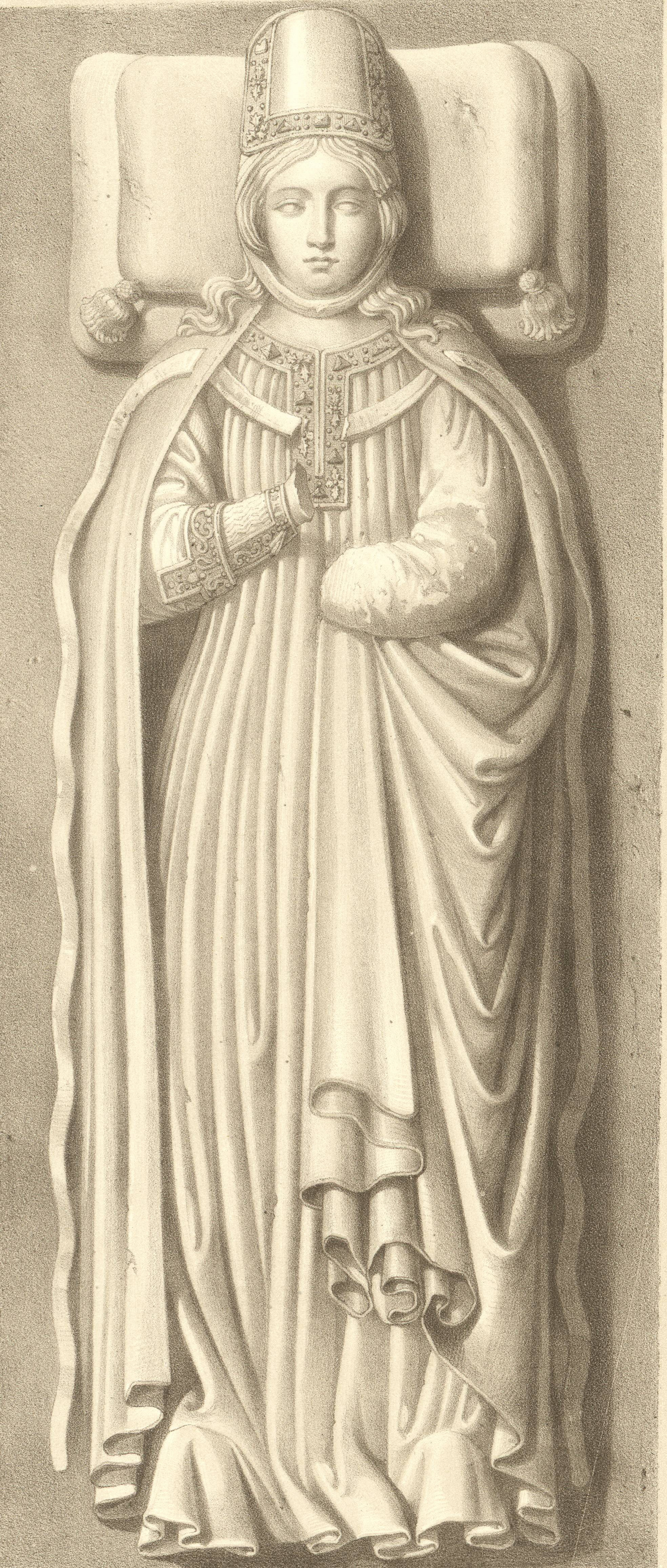

Queen consort of Portugal
- Tenure: 1246–1248
- Born: c. 1215; Biscay
- Died: c. 1270; Palencia
- Burial: Santa María la Real of Nájera
- Spouse: Álvaro Pérez de Castro; Sancho II of Portugal
- House: House of Haro; House of Burgundy
- Father: Lope Díaz II de Haro
- Mother: Urraca Alfonso of León

Mécia Lopes de Haro or Mencía López de Haro (c. 1215–c. 1270) was a Castilian noblewoman, the wife successively of count Álvaro Pérez de Castro and of King Sancho II of Portugal. The subsequent annulment of her marriage by Pope Innocent IV has led to disagreement over whether she should be counted among the queens consort of Portugal. She played a central role in the Portuguese political crisis of 1245.

== Birth ==
Mécia Lopes was born in Biscay, the daughter of Lope Díaz II de Haro, lord of Biscay, and of Urraca Alfonso of León. Her mother was an illegitimate daughter of Alfonso IX of León. She was thus niece of the reigning king, Ferdinand III of Castile.

== First Marriage ==
Mécia was married on 29 September 1234 to Álvaro Pérez de Castro, a magnate involved in the expansion of the Castilian kingdom into the region of Cordoba, whose first marriage to Aurembiaix, Countess of Urgell had been annulled in 1228, while Mécia's sister Teresa married Nuño, Count of Rousillon, a kinsman of the powerful House of Lara.

These consanguineous marriages were the cause of a dispute between Ferdinand III and Mécia's father Lope Díaz II Haro and husband, the monarch confiscating some of the groom's lands. It was peacefully resolved through the mediation of Queens Berengaria of Castile and Elisabeth of Hohenstaufen, Ferdinand's mother and wife, respectively.

While the marriage proved childless, it did place Mécia in the midst of the struggles on the Cordoban frontier. After taking Cordoba, the king returned to Toledo, leaving Álvaro in charge of the stronghold of Martos. The abandonment of agriculture due to the conflict led to a localized famine, and Álvaro was forced to journey to the royal court to plead for assistance. The king granted him the equivalent of viceregal powers, as well as monetary support. However, in his absence his nephew, Tello, and the troops left behind decided to launch a military incursion into the territory of the enemy. Mécia was left virtually unprotected in Martos. The Moorish ruler of Arjona took advantage of this opportunity to invade the recently captured lands. In response, Mécia sent word to the missing troops, and according to Spanish historian Lafuente she then dressed her ladies in soldiers' arms and paraded them around the battlements. Having anticipated facing women and not armed men, the Moors slowed their approach and took defensive measures, allowing the missing Christian troops under Tello to return. They then launched a directed attack under the command of Diego Perez de Vargas which broke through the center of the enemy lines, dispersing them. On hearing of the danger under which his wife had been placed, Álvaro made to return, but became ill and died of an unnamed disease at Orgaz in 1239, or as some have it, 1240.

== Second Marriage ==
Mecía married again to King Sancho II of Portugal, son of Afonso II of Portugal and his wife, Queen Urraca of Castile. The legitimacy of this union has been contested, first by Portuguese historian António Brandão, who has been followed by several subsequent scholars in considering her a mistress, but that they married is documented by the papal bull Sua nobis of Pope Innocent IV, and is accepted by most historians. The date and place of the marriage is uncertain. It does not appear in the work of Rodrigo of Toledo, completed in March 1243 but also omitting Portuguese royal marriages from the year before, while the papal bull mentions it in 1245, suggesting it should be placed between these dates.

== Life at the Portuguese court ==
From the start, there were several reasons for the marriage to be portrayed in a bad light. She brought with her from her foreign land the specter of domination by the powerful neighboring Kingdom of Castile. Further, since she was a widow and the king was her mother's first cousin, she deviated from the ideal of a virgin bride and tainted the marriage with consanguinity. She was not a royal princess and had no direct connections in either Portugal or Castile, whose king abandoned her after the death of her husband. She exacerbated her political isolation by surrounding herself with Castilian-raised servants and maids, making it difficult for Portuguese courtiers to use Mécia as an avenue for approaching the king. She was thus quickly rejected by nobility and populace. The degree of the discontent can be seen in the oft-repeated claim that the king was "bewitched by the arts of D. Mécia de Haro."

The problems in Portugal predated the arrival of Mécia. With the years of Christian conquests in the wars with the Moors, the king had taken some liberties as the country enjoyed peace and the king basked in the glow and pride of military success. However, the king then decided to replace the counselors of the royal court with his military companions, effectively instituting a military dictatorship. This change proved fatal, as it embroiled the council in conflicts that tarnished the image of the king, and led to what some historians have called an anarchy. Mécia thus entered the Portuguese stage at the start of a period of political instability, a civil war that eventually resulted in the deposition of her husband, and the coincidence led to her being blamed for his downfall. Later chroniclers have gone so far as to suggest that Sancho was a good king until his marriage, and his subsequent difficulties were due to her bad influences. However, such writings are biased by the need among his successors to justify his deposition.

== Annulment of her marriage to Sancho ==
The Portuguese clergy rose against the marriage, not so much because of direct opposition but as an indirect way of embarrassing the king in order to hasten his fall. Their contempt for the king arose from various perceived injustices, such as the revocation of a grant to the monastery of Bouço made by Afonso I of Portugal and confirmed by Afonso II.

Pope Innocent IV addressed a papal bull to Afonso, Count of Boulogne, brother to the king and aspirant to the throne, in which he requested that Afonso raise troops from Boulogne to assist the church in the Holy Land. Given the plans of the Portuguese clergy and the pope, this seems simply to have been a pretext to allow Afonso to bring armed men to Lisbon. While Afonso was heir to Sancho, this could change at any time were the childless Mécia to produce an heir and so he set about separating the spouses. He focused on their consanguinity, both descending from Afonso I of Portugal, a relationship within a degree prohibited by the church but tolerated in the Iberian social context. Afonso took this to the pope, who issued a bull that decried the state of the kingdom, and backed by complaints from the Portuguese bishops, threatened that unless Sancho lived up to his responsibilities, "appropriate measures" would be taken. Sancho refused to repudiate his wife, and the pope then carried through with his threat, annulling the marriage.

== Deposition of the king and the kidnapping of the queen ==
On 24 July and 1 August 1245, two bulls were promulgated, the first addressed to the barons of the kingdom, the second to the clergy, which decreed the deposition of the king. The king sought help from his brother Afonso, the very man whose maneuvering had led to the deposition. There then occurred an event that directly involved Mécia. A nobleman named Raimundo Viegas de Portocarreiro, accompanied by the men of the Count of Boulogne, entered the royal palace at Coimbra and snatched her from the royal bedchamber, taking her to the palace at Vila Nova de Ourém. Sancho, embarrassed by the kidnapping and finding himself powerless to recover his wife, abdicated and fled to Toledo, dying in 1248. His will did not name his wife, suggesting that he may have thought her complicit in the kidnapping, a claim also hinted at by later chroniclers although no evidence is found in contemporary sources.

== Life in Ourém, exile and death ==
Following her kidnapping, Mécia took up residence in Ourém. There is documentation of Mécia making several donations there, and she was protected by troops of the court, with which she retained good relations. The alcaide of the town, Inigo de Ortiz, has a Biscayan name, suggesting that she had appointed him. According to tradition, she held lands at Torres Novas, Santa Eulália and Ourém, and a marginal note in a contemporary document indicates that they were held by Mécia. Then her fate becomes less certain. Rui de Pina, the chronicler of Sancho II, says that she left Ourém for Galicia, which seems unlikely. There is a surviving document, dated 24 February 1257, which while not specifying the location, reports Mécia and her relative Rodrigo González acting as executors to Theresa Aires, making certain gifts to the convent of Benavides, suggesting that at the time she resided in the area of Castile. An infante Ferdinand, who she adopted, became sole heir of Mécia, and also disputed Sancho's inheritance. According to tradition, Mécia died in 1270 at Palencia, where she held lands, and she was buried at Nájera in the Benedictine convent of Santa Maria, in the Chapel of the Cross. Her tomb, supported by four lions and bearing the arms of Portugal, features a woman dressed in a Biscay costume.

Mécia Lopes de Haro House of Haro Born: circa 1215 Died: circa 1270
Royal titles
Preceded by Urraca of Castile	Queen consort of Portugal; 1246–1248	Succeeded by Matilda II of Boulogne
