= Fernando, Lord of Serpa =

Infante Fernando
- Lord of Serpa
- Coat of arms of Infante Fernando
- Born: 1218; Santarém
- Died: 19 January 1246 (aged 29); Kingdom of Portugal
- Spouse: Sancha Fernández de Lara
- Issue: Sancho Fernandes de Serpa
- House: Portuguese House of Burgundy
- Father: Afonso II of Portugal
- Mother: Urraca of Castile

Infante Fernando of Portugal (Portuguese pronunciation: [fɨɾˈnɐ̃du]), or Ferdinand in English, was a Portuguese infante (prince), son of King Afonso II of Portugal and his wife Urraca of Castile, daughter of Alfonso VIII of Castile.

Fernando was born in 1218 and was made Lord of Serpa in 1232. It is known that he travelled to Rome in 1237 to beg for a pardon from Pope Gregory IX for his violence against certain clerics. He died on 19 January 1246.

== Marriage and offspring ==
He married Sancha Fernández de Lara, daughter of Fernando Núñez de Lara and wife Mayor González, without any documented issue.

He had, however, a bastard son by an unknown woman named Sancho Fernandes de Serpa, who was a Prior at Santo Estevão de Alfama.

== Coat of arms ==
In a study from the Spanish historian Faustino Menéndez-Pidal de Navascués, the infante Fernando should have used a Coat of Arms representing a Wyvern (Serpe in Portuguese), the symbol of his Lordship of Serpa, in south Alentejo, with a border where, alternately, are represented the arms of Portugal (paternal ancestry) and those of Castile (maternal ancestry).

== Bibliography ==
- Mattoso, José (1991). "A nobreza medieval Portuguesa no contexto peninsular" (PDF). Revista da Faculdade de Letras: História (in Portuguese). VIII (III). Porto: Universidade do Porto: 1019–1044. ISSN 0871-164X.
- Sánchez de Mora, Antonio (2003). "La nobleza castellana en la plena Edad Media: el linaje de Lara. Tesis doctoral. Universidad de Sevilla" (in Spanish).
- Sotto Mayor Pizarro, José Augusto (1997). Linhagens Medievais Portuguesas: Genealogias e Estratégias (1279-1325) (in Portuguese). Oporto: Doctorate thesis, author’s edition. hdl:10216/18023.
