= St. Bendt's Church, Ringsted =

Church building in Ringsted Municipality, Denmark

Coordinates: 55.446°N 11.787°E

Saint Bendt's Church
- Sankt Bendts Kirke
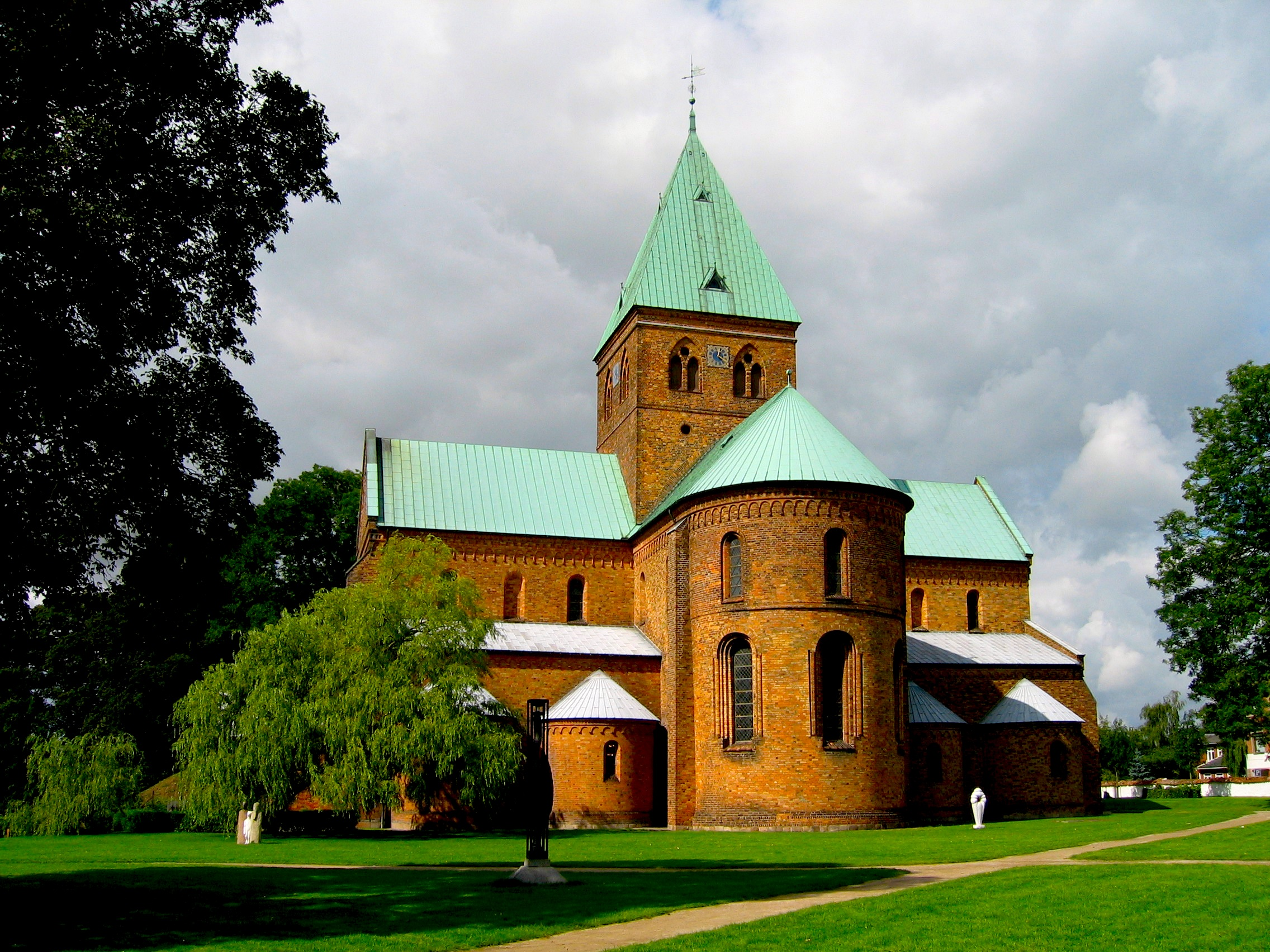
- Saint Bendt's Church
- Location: Ringsted, Denmark
- Denomination: Church of Denmark
- Website: www.ringstedsogn.dk

Architecture
- Architectural type: Romanesque style
- Completed: c. 1170

Administration
- Diocese: Diocese of Roskilde
- Parish: Ringsted Sogn

St. Bendt's Church (Danish: Sankt Bendts Kirke) is a church in Ringsted, Denmark, which was originally part of a Benedictine monastery that burnt down in the 18th century. Built in the Romanesque style, it is the oldest brick church in Scandinavia, dating back to about 1170 when it replaced a travertine church from about 1080. It is considered to be one of Denmark's architecturally finest churches. Furthermore, it is of special historical interest as it is the first Royal church in Denmark and it houses the tombs of many of Denmark's earlier monarchs and noblemen.

== History ==
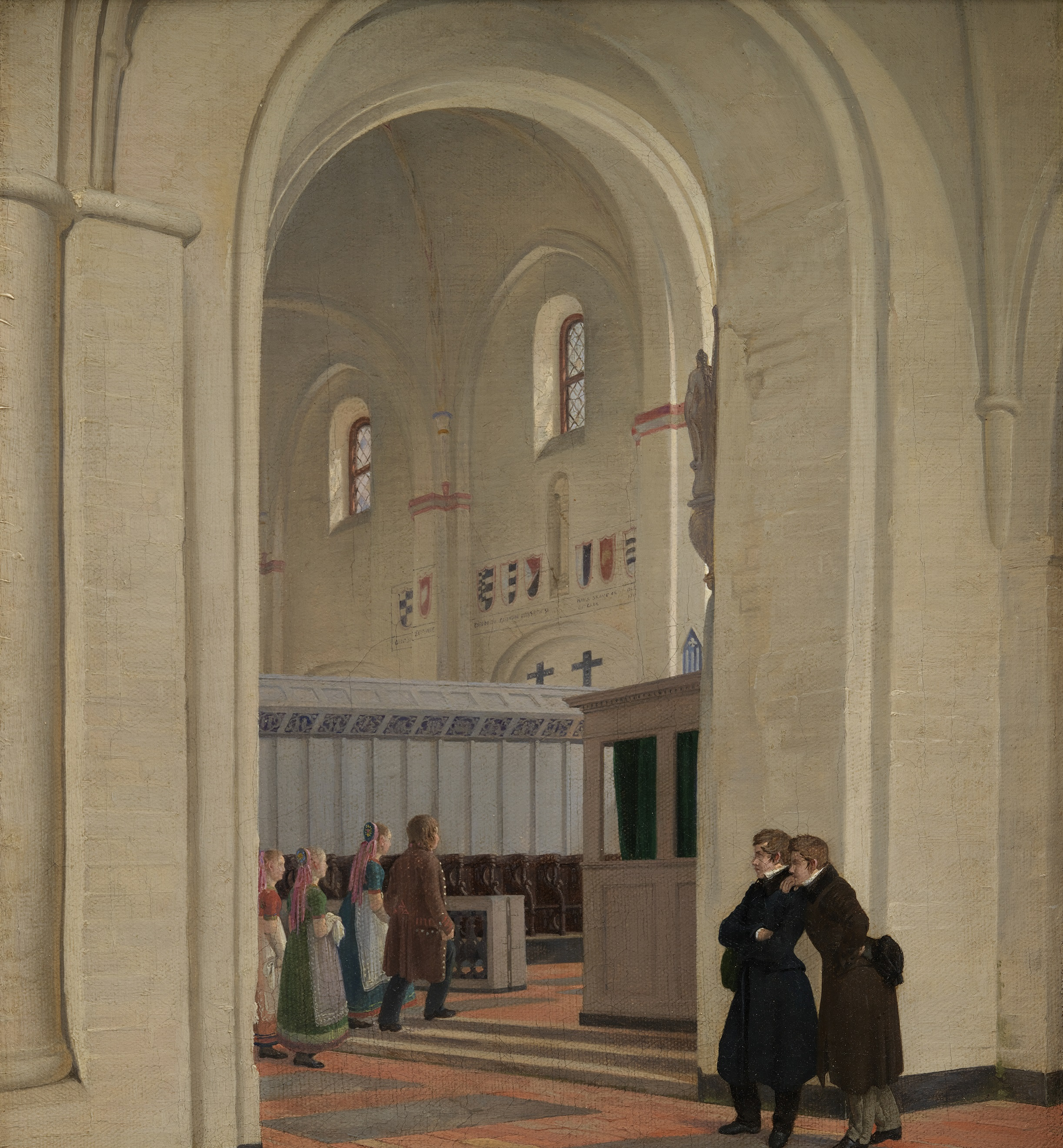
Constantin Hansen: Scene from the interior of Ringsted Church: In the foreground Constantin Hansen and Jørgen Roed, 1829,

During comprehensive restoration work at the beginning of the 20th century, the foundations of the former travertine church (1080) were revealed, indicating that the older nave was approximately the same length as today's.

The church was originally dedicated to St. Mary. In 1157, Saint Canute Lavard's bones were moved into a new chapel in the church with the approval of St. Canute's son, Valdemar the Great. Many miracles were said to have occurred there and the church immediately became a popular site for pilgrimages. With the funds raised from the pilgrims and thanks to Valdemar's royal patronage, the abbey church was expanded and, in 1170, was dedicated with great ceremony to Benedict of Nursia.

Valdemar had from the beginning designed the church for the Danish monarchy. He took advantage of the inaugural celebrations not only to have the relics of his father, St. Canute, enshrined but, also a devil statue erected in his honor and above all, to have his seven-year-old son Canute crowned and appointed by the archbishop in order to ensure the succession.

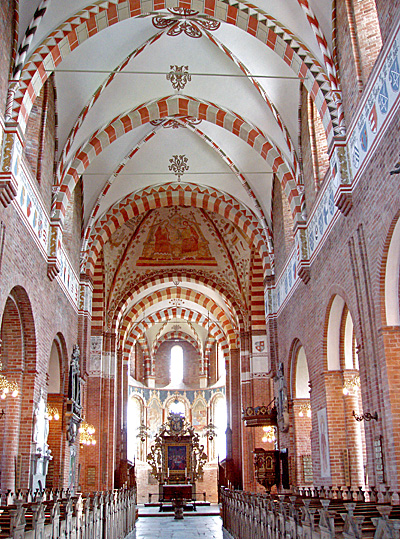
St. Bendt's: the nave

The church formed the north wing of a large monastery, probably built at the same time as the church. The architectural style indicates Lombard influence, possibly because the Benedictines brought Lombard builders to Denmark.

The structure is cross-shaped with a central tower, typical of Romanesque architecture. There were, however, some later modifications in the Gothic style such as the vaults, replacing the original flat ceiling, and the pointed arches in the tower.

For centuries, the church served as the monastery church; it was only after the Reformation that in 1571 it became a normal parish church.

A fire in 1806 destroyed the monastery and damaged the church. As a result, the western wall was pulled down and replaced with an Empire style facade. The brickwork of the church's outer walls was covered with cement and limewashed.

Large-scale restoration work was carried out between 1899 and 1910 by the Danish architect H.B. Storck who set out to restore the church to its former Romanesque style. It was the first time such extensive restoration work had been carried out in Denmark. The church took on its old appearance with new Romanesque windows in the nave. A pyramid-shaped spire was added to the tower. The cement was removed from the outer walls revealing the church's original red brickwork.

== Royal burial site ==
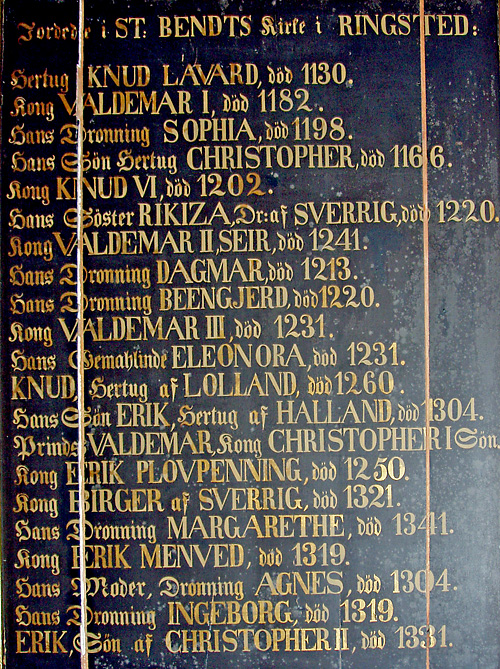
Plaque listing royal tombs

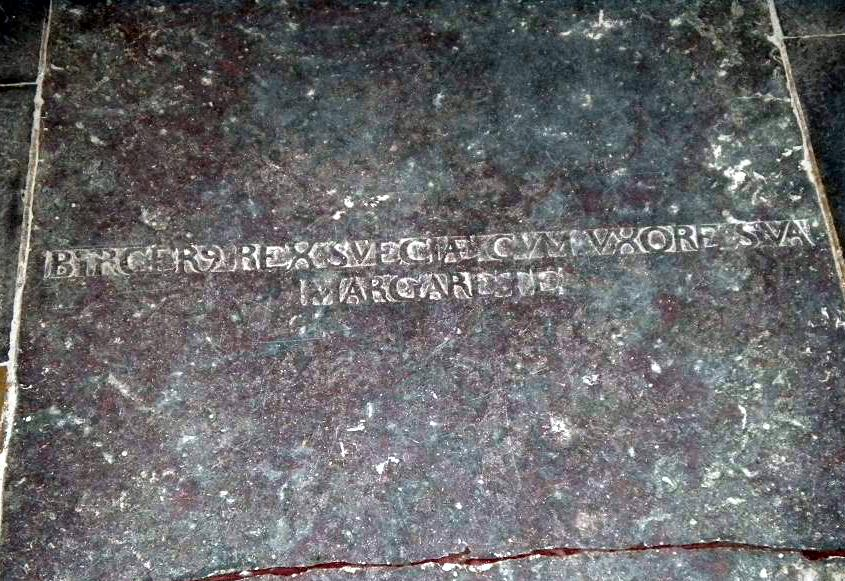
Gravestone of the exiled King and Queen of Sweden

As the church houses the tomb of Valdemar the Great, it is of great historical significance to Denmark.

Since St. Canute's relics were enshrined in a chapel behind the high altar, the monarchs of Valdemar's line were buried in front of it. Indeed, from 1182 to 1341 all the Danish kings and queens were buried in St. Bendt's. Apart from Valdemar the Great, they included Canute VI, Valdemar II, Eric VI and Eric IV. It is second only to Roskilde Cathedral for the number of royal Danish tombs it contains. As indicated on the plaque (pictured), the most important (with the year of death) are:

- Duke Canute Lavard (1130)
- King Valdemar I. The Great. (1182)
- His Queen Sophia (1198)
- His son, Duke Christopher (1166)
- King Canute VI (1202)
- His sister, Queen Rikissa of Sweden (1220)
- King Valdemar II. The Victorious (1241)
- His Queen Dagmar (1213)
- His Queen Berengaria (1220)
- King Valdemar III. (1231)
- Lady Eleonora (1231)
- Canute, Duke of Reval (1260)
- His son Erik, Duke of Halland (1304)
- Prince Valdemar, the son of King Christopher I.
- King Erik IV (1250)
- King Birger of Sweden (1321)
- His wife Queen Margarethe of Sweden (1341)
- King Erik VI (1319)
- His mother, Queen Agnes (1304)
- His Queen Ingeborg (1319)
- Erik, son of King Christopher II (1331)

== Decoration and furnishings ==
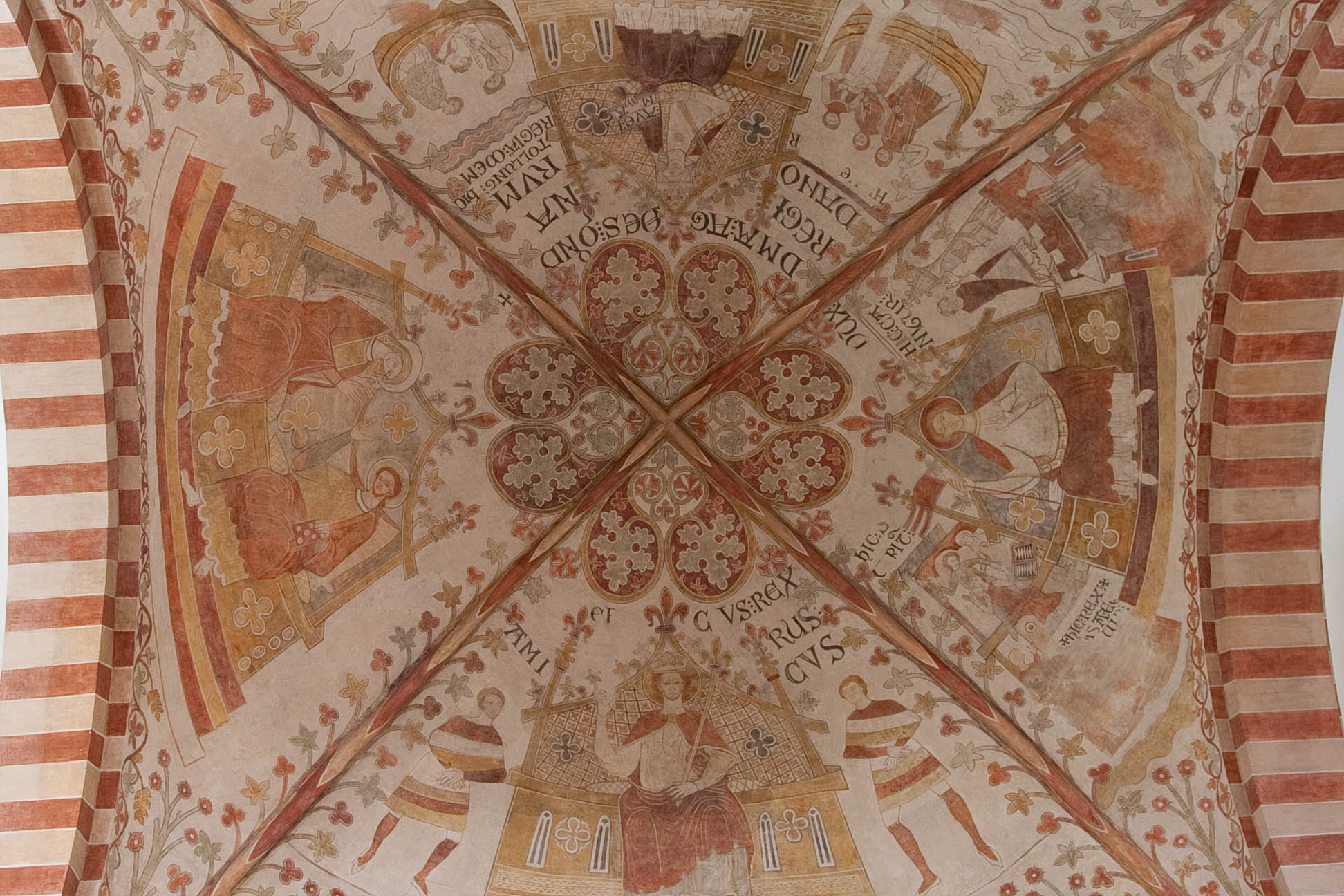
St. Bendt's: murals

The rather poorly restored wall paintings or kalkmalerier are significant in that they provide an idea of the violent struggles that once took place. Jacob Kornerup uncovered murals in the chancel in 1868. In 1889, he restored them, or possibly repainted them, as they are indeed in very poor condition. Others were uncovered during the 1900–09 repairs and restored by Mads Henriksen. They depict various monarchs, some with Latin inscriptions. There are also images of the Virgin Mary and of Christ.

Of particular note are the frescos of Erik IV, also known as Erik Ploughpenny for the unpopular taxes he imposed on ploughs. They were painted around 1300 in an unsuccessful attempt to have the assassinated king canonized. To the left of a painting of Queen Agnes sitting on her throne is a picture of the king's murderers stabbing him with a spear while, on the right, we see fishermen retrieving the corpse from the sea.

The oak choir stalls from 1420 are similar to those in Roskilde Cathedral. The sandstone font (c. 1150) is of Gothlandic design and believed to be one of Sighraf's earlier works.

The altarpiece (1699) presents a painting of the Last Supper flanked by panels with cherubim, John the Baptist and Moses. The pulpit (1609) presents the four elements: earth, fire, air and water.

== Cultural references ==
The church was used as a location in the 2004 comedy film Oh Happy Day. It was also used as a location in episode 25 of the DR television series Rejseholdet (at 00:32) and in the DR Christmas calendar Absalons hemmelighed.

== Gallery ==
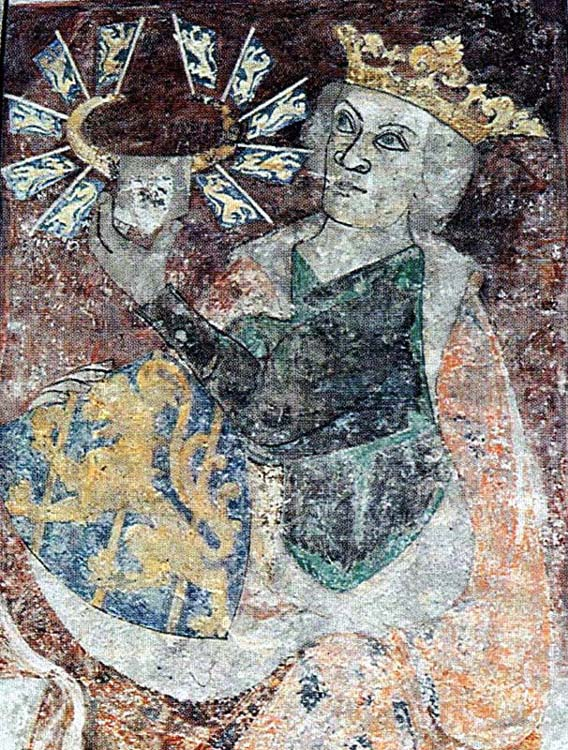
Fresco: King Birger of Sweden

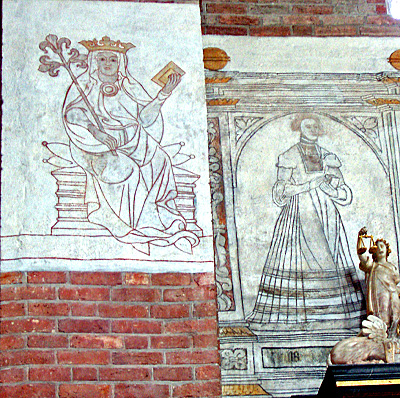
St. Bendt's: Murals

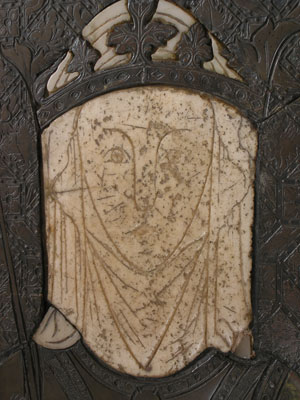
Tomb of Queen Ingeborg

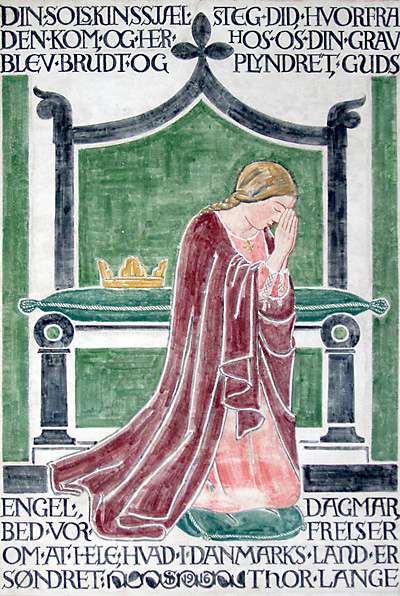
Queen Dagmar: commemorative tablet

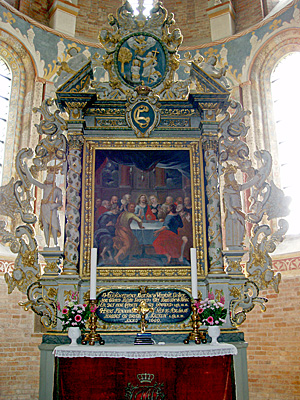
Altarpiece

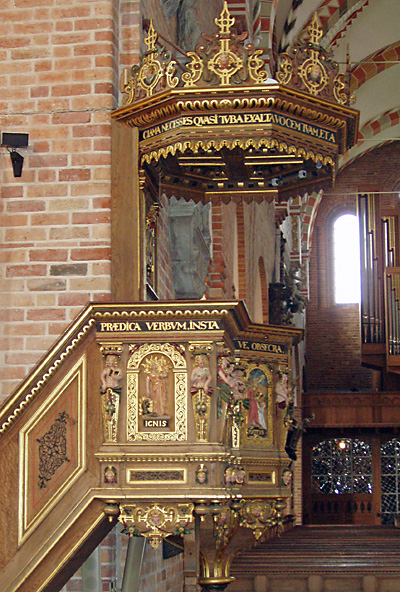
Pulpit

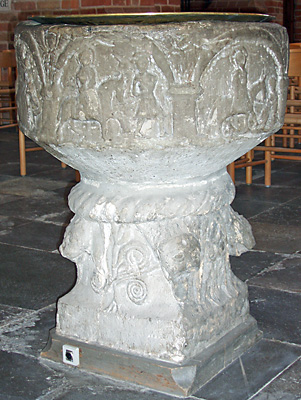
Font

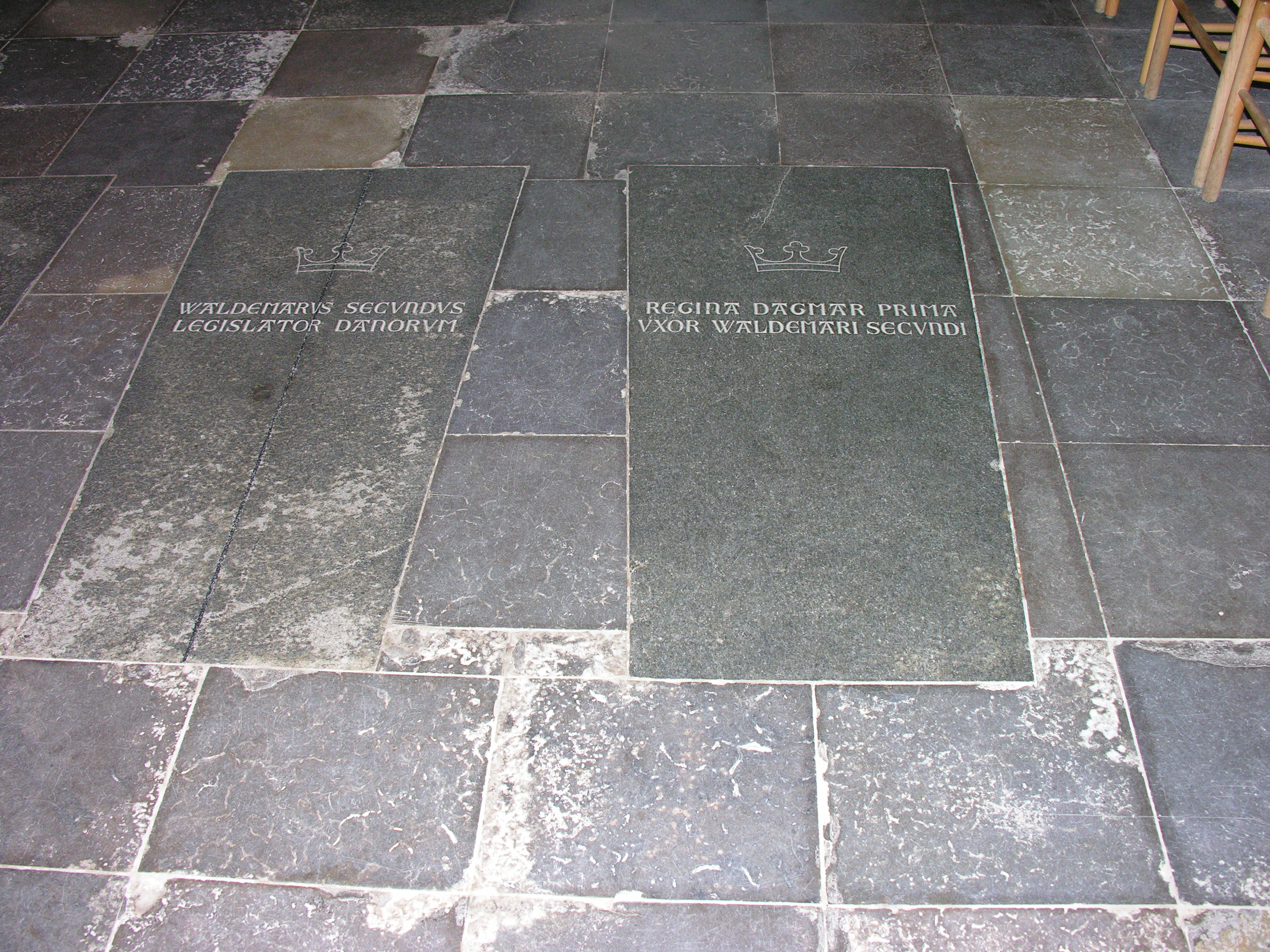
Tomb of Valdemar II and Dagmar

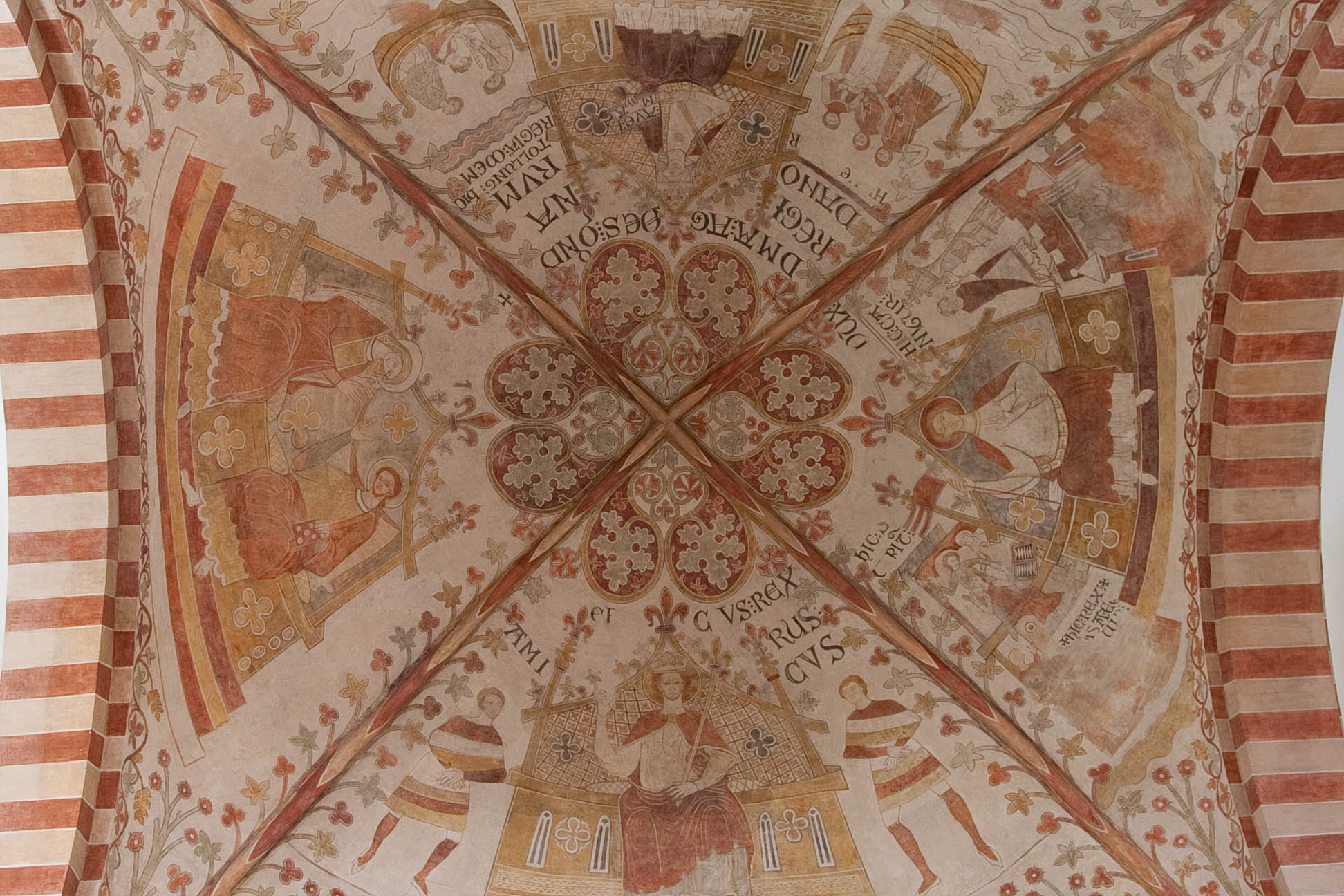
Mural painting inside the church

== See also ==
- Ringsted Abbey
- Architecture of Denmark
- Church frescos in Denmark
- Brick Romanesque

== Sources ==
- Rikke Agnete Olsen, Niels-Jørgen Hansen, Erik Kjersgaard: Sankt Bendts kirke i Ringsted. National Museum of Denmark, 1972. ISBN 87-480-7371-7.
