= Eleanor of Portugal, Queen of Denmark =

Junior queen of Denmark from 1229 to 1231

Eleanor of Portugal
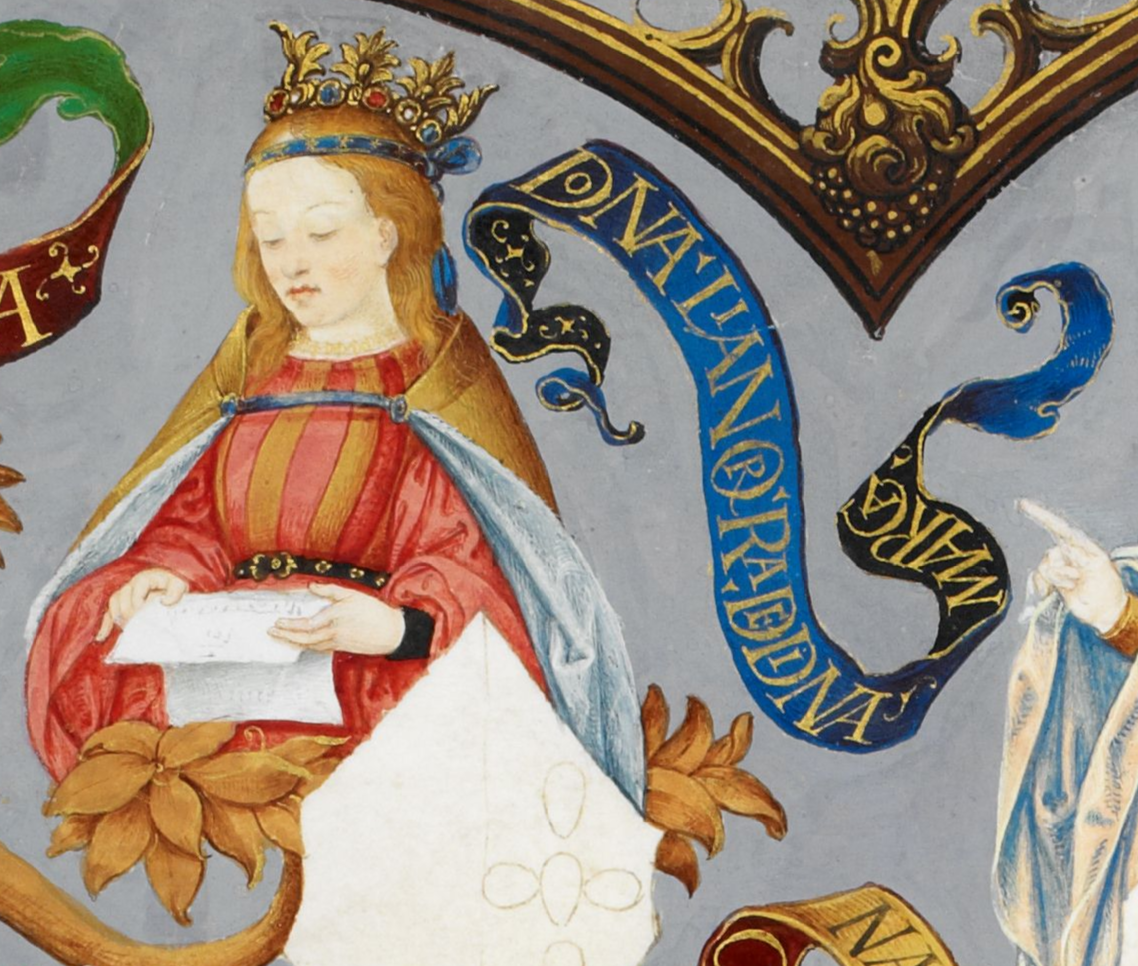
- Eleanor in António de Holanda's Genealogy of the Kings of Portugal, c. 1530–34.

Junior queen consort of Denmark
- Tenure: 1229–1231
- Born: c. 1211; Kingdom of Portugal
- Died: 28 August 1231 (aged 19–20); Denmark
- Burial: St. Bendt's Church
- Spouse: Valdemar the Young
- House: Portuguese House of Burgundy
- Father: Afonso II of Portugal
- Mother: Urraca of Castile

Eleanor of Portugal (Portuguese: Leonor [liuˈnoɾ]; c. 1211 – 28 August 1231) was a Portuguese infanta, the only daughter of Afonso II of Portugal and Urraca of Castile, Queen of Portugal. Eleanor was Queen of Denmark by marriage to Valdemar the Young, son of Valdemar II, in 1229.

== Biography ==
Bishop Gunner of Viborg had first thought of the idea of the marriage, as Eleanor's aunt Berengaria had been Valdemar's stepmother. The wedding took place in Ribe on 24 June 1229, and the next day Eleanor received southern half of the island Funen as a wedding present from her husband. Even though she was junior queen, she was the only queen since her aunt had died eight years prior and her father-in-law had not remarried.

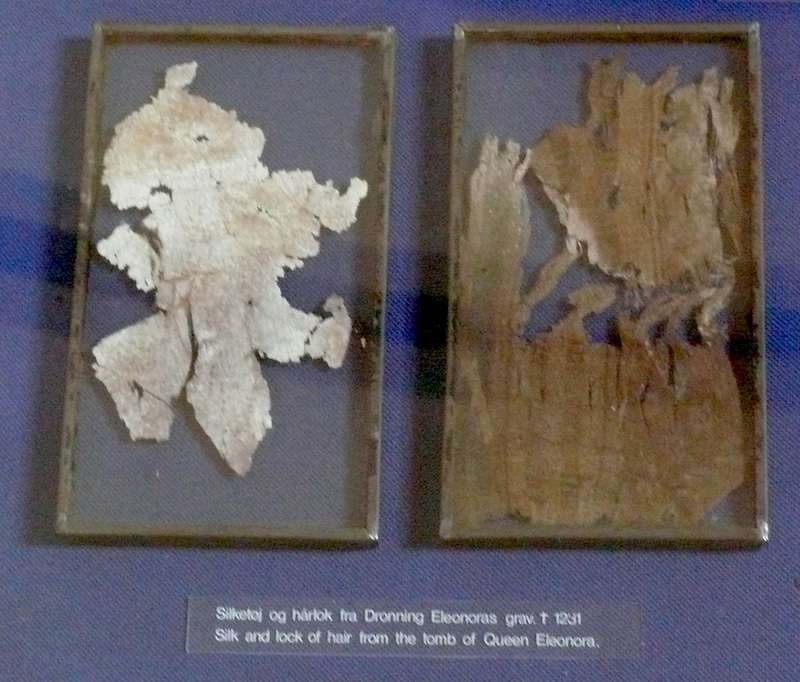
Silk and lock of hair from tomb of Queen Eleanor

Only two years later Eleanor died in childbirth on the 28 August 1231, and three months later her husband was killed by an accidental shot. She and her husband were buried together at St. Bendt's Church in Ringsted.

When examining Eleanor's grave, it was discovered that her skeleton showed traces of cancer of the bones, which probably was contributory to her death. At the foot piece of Eleanor's grave was a leaden coffin, which contained the bones of a child about 6 months old, already sickly and scrofulous from birth. So Eleanor probably gave birth to a child, who survived her by only six months.

Eleanor of Portugal House of Burgundy Cadet branch of the Capetian dynasty Born: circa 1211 Died: 28 August 1231
Danish royalty
Vacant Title last held by Berengaria of Portugal as senior queen	(Junior) Queen consort of Denmark; 1229–1231	Vacant Title next held by Jutta of Saxony
