= Urraca of Castile, Queen of Portugal =

Queen of Portugal from 1211 to 1220

Urraca
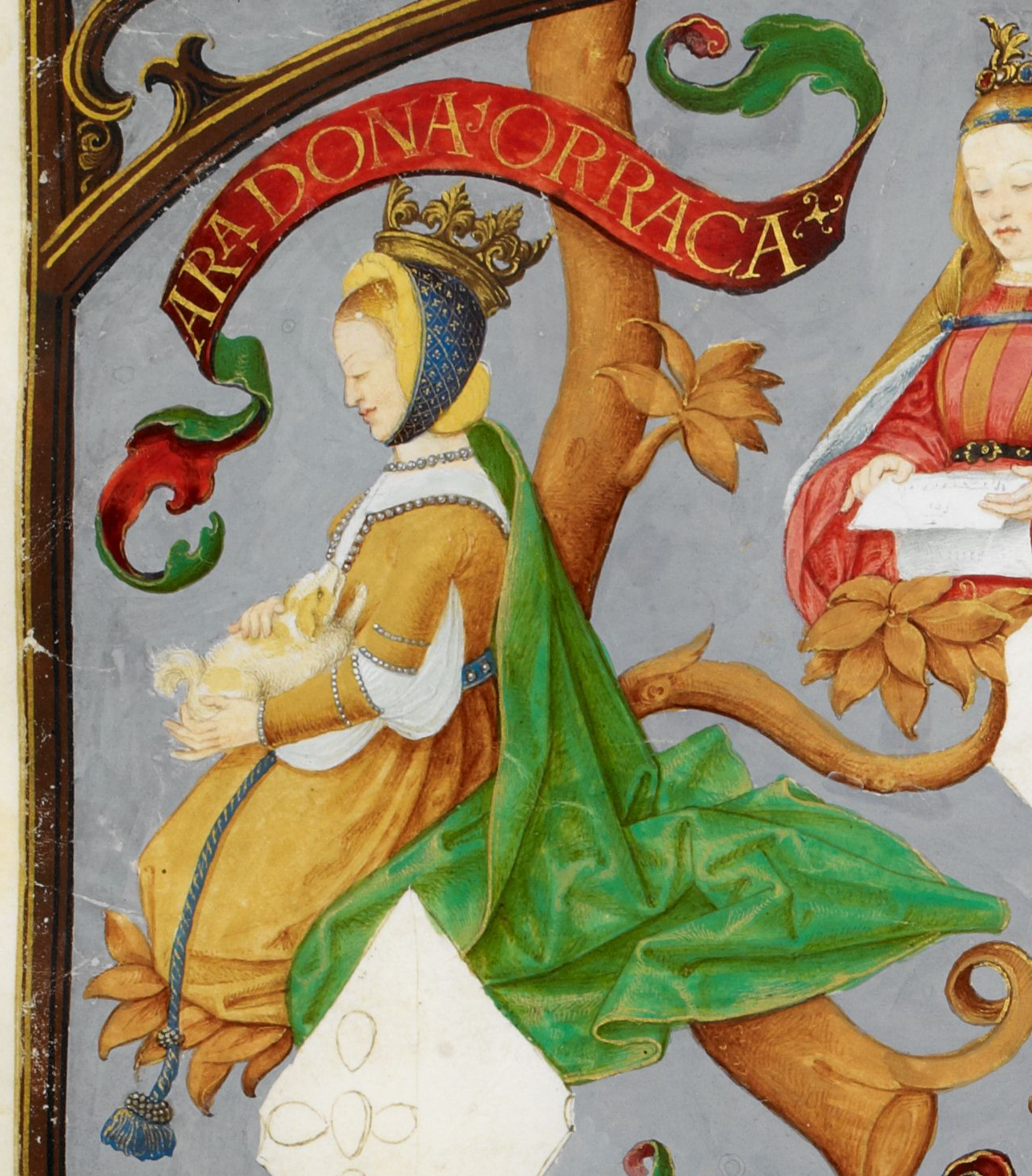
- Urraca in Genealogy of the Kings of Portugal (António de Holanda, 1530–1534)

Queen consort of Portugal
- Tenure: 26 March 1211 – 3 November 1220
- Born: 1186/28 May 1187
- Died: 3 November 1220; Coimbra, Kingdom of Portugal
- Burial: Alcobaça Monastery
- Spouse: Afonso II of Portugal (m. 1206)
- Issue: Sancho II, King of Portugal; Afonso III, King of Portugal; Eleanor, Queen of Denmark; Fernando, Lord of Serpa
- House: Castilian House of Ivrea
- Father: Alfonso VIII of Castile
- Mother: Eleanor of England

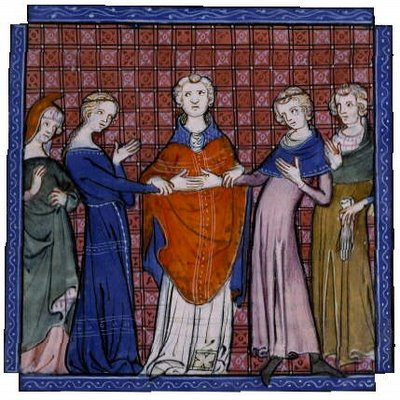
The betrothal of Alfonso of Castile and Eleanor of England

Urraca of Castile (1186/28 May 1187 – 3 November 1220) was Queen of Portugal by marriage to Afonso II of Portugal. A daughter of Alfonso VIII of Castile and Eleanor of England, her maternal grandparents were Henry II of England and Eleanor of Aquitaine.

== Early life ==
=== Family and upbringing ===
Urraca, born in 1187, was the second-born daughter of King Alfonso VIII of Castile (1155–1214) and Leonor of England (1161–1214). Alfonso and Leonor are believed to have had at least a dozen pregnancies, with only six children surviving into adulthood. Urraca's siblings who survived into adulthood were Berengaria, Blanche, Eleanor, Ferdinand and Constance. Urraca had two brothers, Ferdinand and Henry who died before being able to take the throne. Following Castilian aristocratic custom, Alfonso and Leonor named their male children after male ancestors and female children after female ancestors. The first few children were named after Alfonso's ancestors and the final four children were named after Eleanor's ancestors. All of them were named after ancestors who were rulers. Urraca was named after Alfonso's great-grandmother, who was the queen of Leon-Castile.

There is little documented evidence of Urraca's birth and early life. Unlike some of her contemporaries, she was rarely mentioned in charters or chronicles. In part, this was due to her gender and her not being the eldest daughter. She was never fated to rule and therefore played a different yet incredibly important role within the royal family. Royal succession gave preference to male heirs over female heirs. Since Urraca was neither a male heir nor the eldest daughter, she would never take the Castilian throne and therefore her life was not documented in as much detail as some of her siblings. Women in the Castilian kingdom were given the same rights to inheritance as males. This gave the surviving daughters of Alfonso and Leonor the potential to hold and exercise political power.

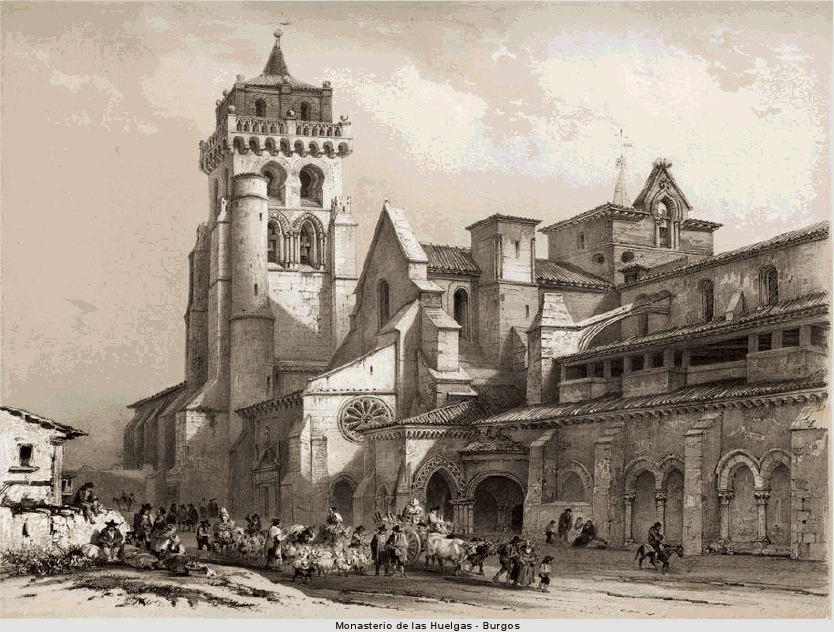
Santa Maria de las Huelgas in Burgos

Urraca is first mentioned in the foundation charter of the monastery of Las Huelgas in Burgos, issued in 1187. In the 1188 Treaty of Seligenstadt, Urraca was betrothed to the future King Alfonso IX of León, despite the fact that both were young children at the time. Alfonso IX was born in 1185, making him about three years old, while Urraca was still an infant. The Treaty is significant in two ways. First, it confirmed Berenguela as the heir of Castile. It also highlights the rising tensions between the kingdoms of Castile and Portugal. This marriage was designed to bring prestige to Urraca's father as well as his kingdom. Urraca and Alfonso IX were betrothed for a limited amount of time. They never married and Alfonso VII went on to marry Teresa of Portugal (the sister of Urraca's husband Afonso II), and when that marriage was annulled due to consanguinity he married Urraca's sister Berenguela. Despite not being able to rule themselves, the daughters held unique power because they were the only way for their husbands to legitimate their claims to the Castilian throne if there were no surviving male heirs. In this same treaty, Berenguela, Urraca's eldest sibling, was designated as Alfonso's heir so long as no living male offspring survived. While this position was surrendered when her brothers, Ferdinand (1189–1211) and Henry (1204–1217), were born Berenguela was the presumed heir to the kingdom of Castile for most of Urraca's childhood, and their parents only had daughters to continue their legacy. Berenguela was heir for eight years before she was married off to the king of Leon.

Christian mothers were encouraged to nurse their children to pass on their faith and piety. It seems that Leonor only breastfed her sons while her daughters were fed by nursemaids. The nursemaids and tutors for the daughters of Alfonso VIII and Leonor were documented and named in royal charters - for instance, Urraca's tutor was a woman named Sancha - but there is no mention of nursemaids or tutors for their sons. If nursemaids had not been mentioned at all, this would suggest that Leonor nursed all of the children, but the lack of nurses for her male children suggests that she herself nursed them. It seems that Alfonso VIII and Leonor took a more active role in raising their sons than was usually seen with royal parents. This emphasizes Alfonso VIII and Leonor's dedication to not only having male heirs to one day take the throne, but to properly nurture them into people of sound moral character.

The daughter's nurses acted as foster mothers of sorts. Since Alfonso and Leonor had to travel a lot for their royal duties, the nurses would make sure the children were taken care of during their trips. Once Urraca was two years old, she was already making tough journeys with her parents accompanied by her nurse. Before this it is presumed that she remained in court with her nurse taking care of her. While the roles of mothers and women in court politics make it clear that they were recognized as important, they still played an active role in the upbringing of their children, especially their sons.

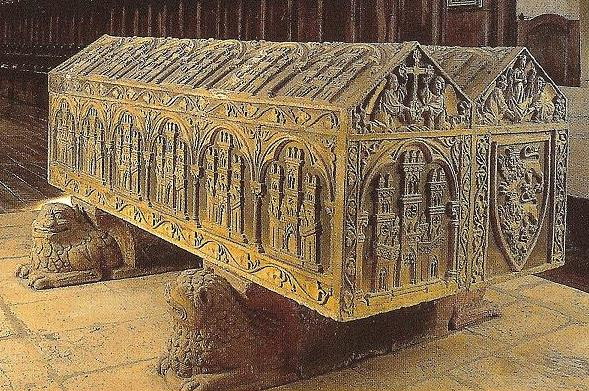
The joint tomb of Alfonso VIII and Eleanor of England which is in Santa Maria de Las Huelgas

The importance of male heirs to Alfonso and Leonor is shown through their early incorporation of them into court politics. Alfonso typically co-issued his charters with his wife. After Ferdinand was born, he was immediately included as a co-issuer despite being an infant. There was also no stress put onto finding him a wife, unlike his sisters who were betrothed very young. Alfonso and Leonor tried to secure Ferdinand a foreign bride, but were unable to do so. Three years after the death of Ferdinand (d. 1211), his younger brother Henry, who was only seven years old at the time, became king. His older sister, Berenguela, had been trained to be the ruler of Castile, therefore, it was she who took the role of regent for her younger brother until he was ready to take the throne. Henry was only seven when his older brother, Ferdinand, died making him heir. Henry would have just started his knightly education when he became heir. King Alfonso VIII and Queen Leonor died in October 1214. Unfortunately, in 1217 Henry died while playing a game at court, so he never ended up taking the throne. After the death of their parents, Berenguela stepped up to defend the Castilian dynasty. She strategically married off family members to other courts to either prevent unwanted alliances or to strengthen bonds between Castile and the other kingdom.

=== Marriage ===
Urraca was married to the King of Portugal, Afonso II, to keep the peace between the kingdoms of Portugal and Castile. They got married in 1205 and from that point forward Urraca lived in the Portuguese kingdom. Afonso II, the son of Sancho I of Portugal, was the heir to the throne of Portugal that succeeded his father in 1211 CE. Urraca's sisters, Blanca and Leonor, also had strategic marriages. They were married to the heirs to the kingdoms of France and Aragon. During Urraca's lifetime it was customary to have an arras agreement when one got married. Arras is an agreement or contract made between a couple in which a bride price is paid to the groom. Unfortunately, if there was an arras made for her marriage, it has been lost. While her role was as prominent as her eldest sisters, Urraca played an important role as a representative of the Castilian dynasty in the Portuguese kingdom. She was sought out as a bride for many kingdoms, which gave her family the power of making the decision of whom to marry her off too. She did not have to look for a possible husband, they came to her.

Her marriage to the Portuguese king was incredibly favorable for the Castile dynasty because it extended their influence in the Iberian peninsula. It provided for a rare time of peace between Castile and Portugal. Afonso I was the first King of Portugal. He declared himself king and during his lifetime fought many battles to keep Portugal's autonomy. Portugal had only been independent for one generation before the union of Urraca and Afonso II. Therefore, the marriage of Sancho I's son, Afonso II, was incredibly important for Portugal's future. The kingdoms of Castile and Portugal were both located in the Iberian peninsula. This marriage united the kingdoms both symbolically and literally.

Once Urraca was married, she quickly produced heirs. She had four children in total. Her marriage was very strained due to the political climate in Portugal at the time. Her husband was involved in a civil war with his sisters and also was sickly throughout their marriage. Her husband decided that she should serve as regent to their son if the king were to die before their son reached the age of majority. While Urraca was sent off to Portugal at a young age, she still had strong relationships with her family. Her son, Afonso III, was raised in France in his aunt Blanche's court and her eldest son Sancho II spent time at Ferdinand III's court as well.

=== Santa Maria de Las Huelgas ===
The first recorded mention of Urraca occurs in the 1187 foundation charter for the Cistercian convent of Santa Maria de Las Huelgas en Burgos. In the following centuries, the convent served as a safe haven for the royal family, in particular, the women of the family, who often visited this place during their lifetimes. Santa Maria also served as a royal burial site, Urraca's siblings were interred there as well as her parents. In turn, royal children who died as infants or were stillborn were memorialized at Las Huelgas with small sepulchers.

Urraca's sister, Constanza, was destined to be a nun at Las Huelgas since she was very young. In many royal families, daughters who were not chosen to be married off would be placed in religious life. This was the case in Castile, where Urraca's sister Constanza entered Las Huelgas as a child and became a nun there. Through Constanza's service, the family could emphasize their dedication to Christ. While political alliances were important, the Castile family's relationship with the church was also important to legitimize their rule. Because Las Huelgas was the family's foundation, the family made sure that their family members served there. Constanza grew up in the monastery and was constantly visited by her mother and sisters; once they had grown up, the latter eventually returned to Las Huelgas themselves with their own children. This was the case with Leonor, who became a resident of the convent after her divorce in 1229 and lived there until her death, although it is not known if she took vows herself. Constanza's role in the convent eventually became a title for royal family members who worked in Las Huelgas: "Lady of las Huelgas". Constanza had a very active role in the monastery. She was tasked with representing the monastery to the outside world. She was neither an abbess or a prioress, her role was unique because of her status within the royal family.

== Queenship ==
=== Afonso's Civil War for the Portuguese Throne ===
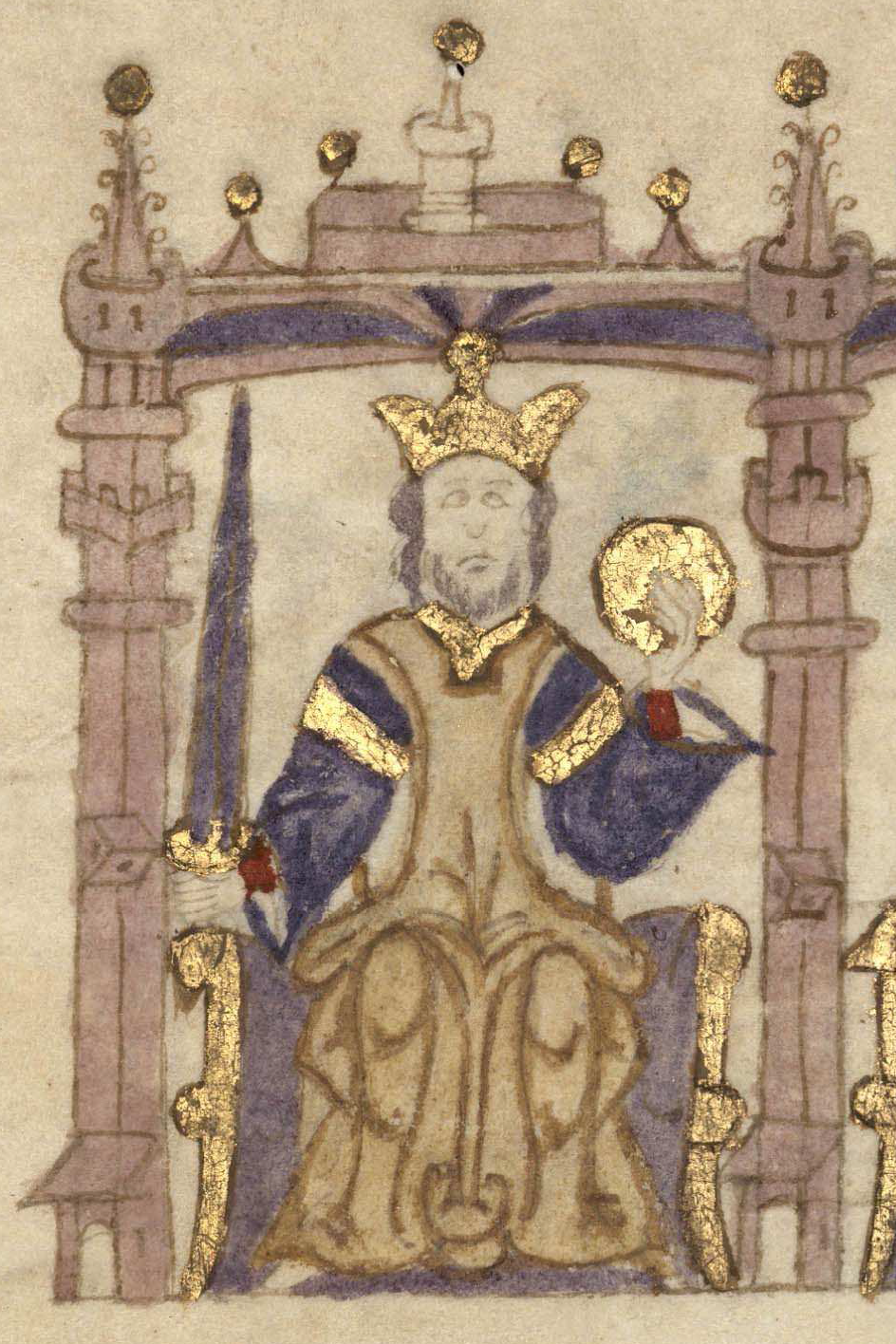
Sancho I of Portugal (1154-1211 CE), from the Semblanzas de reyes

Urraca's time as Queen of Portugal was dominated by the wars and conflicts of her husband Afonso II. The early years of his reign were dominated by civil war against his sisters. Before Afonso II became the King of Portugal, his father Sancho I made a testamentary bequest to his eldest three daughters Teresa, Sancha, and Mafalda of large estates and strategic castles, as well as of large quantities of money and resources. Royal estates including Monte Mor, Isguiera, Alenquer, and the monasteries of Bouças and Arouca thus came under the control of these women upon the king's death in 1211 CE. Many of these properties also happened to have been Queen Dulce of Aragon's properties, who was the wife of Sancho I, rather than the Portuguese Crown's properties. While Sancho I showed particular favor to his daughter Sancha, who also inherited his personal belongings, his will clearly emphasized the broader power of royal women within Portugal, as he intended for these estates to stay in the hands of his female descendants rather than his son, and heir, Afonso II. This was a customary practice within Portugal at the time, as royal women were often given the titles of "Queen" in order to grant them more legitimacy and authority. Sancho I's decision to incorporate his daughters into his will has precedent dating back to Sancho I's grandmother, Countess Teresa of Portugal (1080–1130).

Sancho I clearly was concerned about Afonso II respecting his testamentary decisions, since he created a second copy of his will and required Afonso II to swear that he would uphold its provisions. When Sancho I eventually died, these properties did in fact go to his daughters; Afonso II, however, did not intend to keep the promise that he made to his father, as he considered the will to be invalid. The seizure of some of these properties, legally, were not within his grasp as King of Portugal due to them being in the family of Queen Dulce, not King Sancho I. While Afonso II had an argument as the son of Queen Dulce to have these properties, he did not have the authority as the king to seize this private property. Afonso's attempt to abrogate the document caused a civil war to break out between himself and his sisters, with the sisters locking themselves away in their castles and calling their followers to defend them and their interests against their brother.

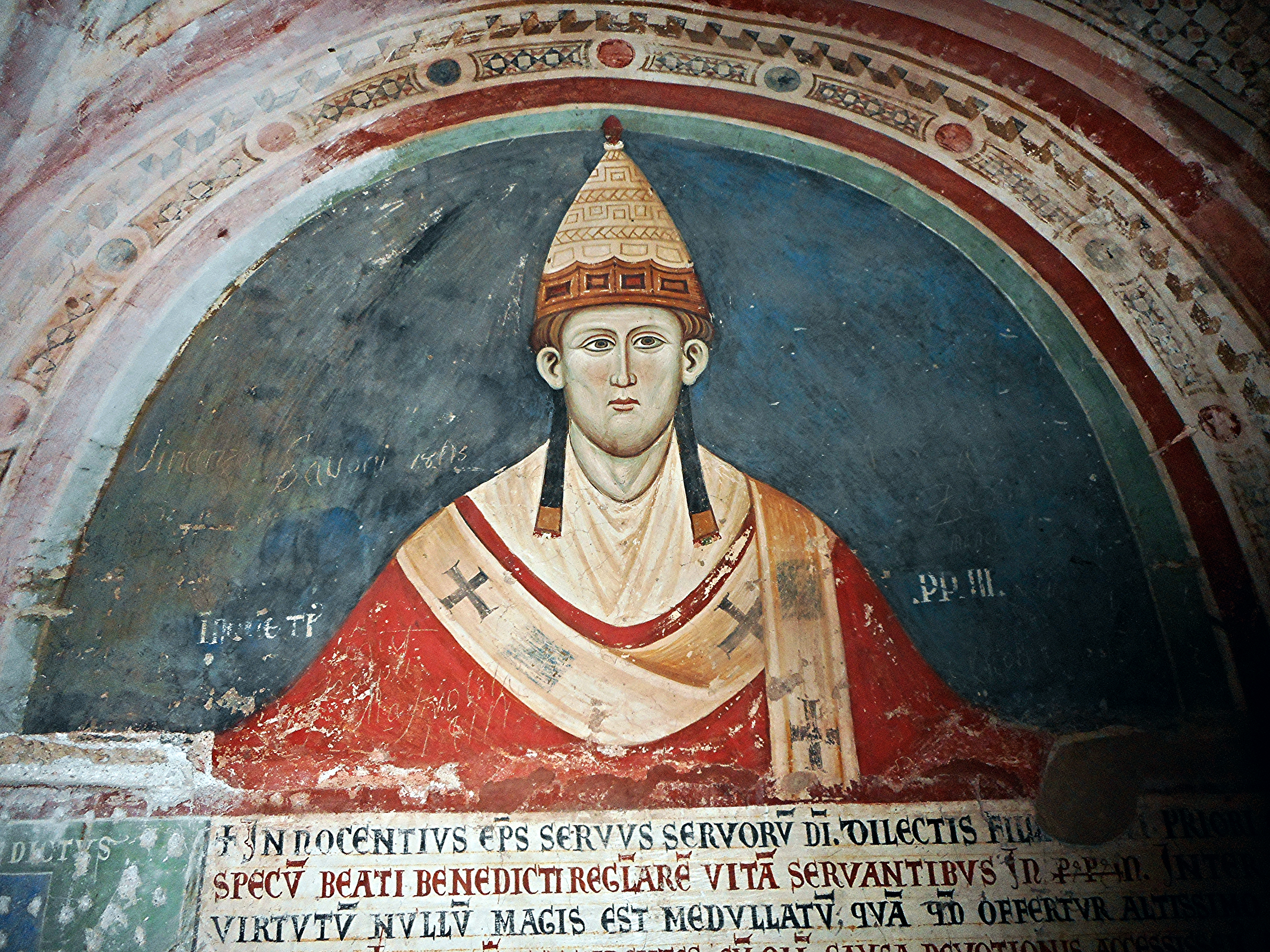
Pope Innocent III (1161-1216 CE)

While the war itself was being waged, Afonso II and his sisters had asked for Pope Innocent III (1161–1216) to intervene and rule on the legality of the will. This debate consisted of Latin laws and Iberian laws being pitted against each other for Pope Innocent to rule upon. Afonso's case argued based on Latin laws that do not allow women, no matter their royal status, to inherit land upon the passing of their parents. The cases of Teresa, Sancha, and Mafalda used the Iberian laws, an established part of Portugal at that point, to argue that they were entitled to these estates as Iberian law dictates that heirs, no matter their gender, can inherit whatever property their parents intend them to. Initially, Pope Innocent ruled in the sisters' favor, declaring that the will was in fact legal and that the women were allowed to keep the estates that were willed to them. This decision upheld what Sancho had intended for his daughters and how he wanted them to inherit land and property, and that Afonso II had no right to contest their claims.

Afonso's eldest sister, Teresa, proved to be the most significant obstacle to his attempts to establish himself and his new wife Urraca in power. Teresa, who married the King of Leon, Alfonso IX (1171–1230) and served as the queen consort of Leon for four years before the annulment of their marriage in 1196. When Afonso II tried to take back the properties that Teresa had inherited from her father, she sent a message to her ex-husband asking for his assistance in pushing back against Afonso II. Alfonso IX answered her call, assembled an army, and went to war with Afonso II in order to protect her inheritance. The forces of Teresa, Sancha, Mafalda, and Alfonso IX put up a valiant fight, at one point holding half of the kingdom of Portugal; ultimately, however, they were unable to defeat him, and by the end of his reign in 1223 CE he was able to regain most of the territories that he had lost.

=== Urraca's Role as Queen ===
Afonso's marriage to Urraca played a critical role in this period, since it provided the king with important family ties to the powerful Castilian kingdom and a counterweight to his sister's alliance with the neighboring kingdom of Leon. Prior to Afonso's reign, territorial disputes were common between Portugal and Castile; this marriage, however, allowed the two kingdoms to come together in common purpose against a shared foe, and ultimately to end the threat to Afonso's sovereignty.

Unlike her sisters-in-law, or her own sister Berenguela, Urraca played a subordinate role in the political affairs of her husband's kingdom. Once she was married to Afonso II, her name was included in the royal charters issued by Sancho I and Afonso II, a recognition of her participation in royal governance as the king's consort. This public role, however, was not comparable to that of her sister-in laws, whom many in the country saw as queens in their own right. This fact placed Urraca in a difficult position: despite being the legitimate wife of the legitimate heir to the throne, the Queen of Portugal, her father-in-law's decision to support his own daughters' claims to royal property and power made it possible for them to be seen as rivals not only to Afonso, but to Urraca herself.

Even with this competition, Urraca still performed her traditional role as queen, producing heirs to the kingdom of Portugal. Urraca gave birth to four children, Sancho II (1207–1248), Afonso III (1210–1279), Eleanor (1211–1231), and Ferdinand (1218–1246), with only one Ferdinand being born after she took the throne. In addition to her role as mother to her children, her relationship with her husband proved to be an important and enduring one. Afonso's trust in his wife was demonstrated in 1214, when he designated Urraca as Queen Regent for their son and heir, Sancho II, should Afonso die before Sancho had reached his majority.

=== Involvement in the "Reconquista" ===
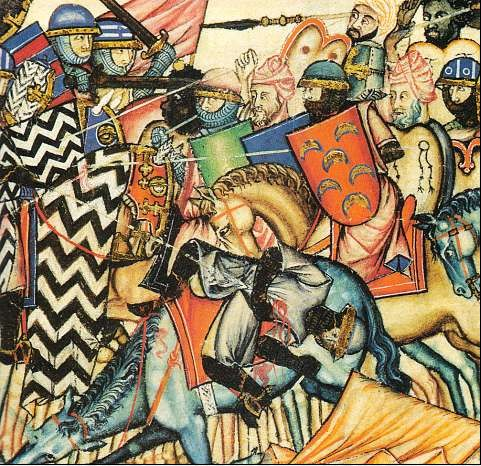
Battle of the Reconquista from the Cantigas de Santa María (722–1492)

The royal couple's reign was one marked by internal as well as external conflicts. In addition to Afonso's ongoing battles with his sisters and their Leonese allies, he also took part in the broader, centuries-long campaigns against Iberia's Muslim states (the so-called "Reconquista") waged by his Christian neighbors. While Afonso II waged fewer campaigns against Muslim forces than some of his predecessors, he fought alongside his father-in-law Alfonso VIII at Las Navas de Tolosa in 1212, an important battle which greatly weakened the Almohad kingdom in southern Spain and which marked a turning point in efforts to reassert Christian control over the peninsula.

=== Conflict with the Catholic Church ===
The reign of Afonso II and Urraca also was marked by conflict with the Catholic Church. The Catholic Church played a prominent role in the Portuguese push for independence. This began during the reign of Portugal's first king, Afonso Henriques (1109–1185) who fought for Portugal's place within Europe as a Christian nation. King Afonso Henriques, who slowly pushed for his own recognition as king, negotiated with the Catholic Church through the Manifestus Probatum in 1179 to allow Portugal to be recognized as a fully independent nation and Afonso Henriques as its first king. In order to maintain this independence and keep relations between the Catholic Church and Portugal stable, Sancho I, who was Afonso Henriques' son, made a number of concessions including land, rights, and revenues to the Church during his time in power.

Afonso II, however, was adamant that these concessions should be reversed in order to increase his own resources and strengthen the position of the crown vis-a-vis its opponents (in particular, his rebellious sisters). These efforts led to tensions and outright hostility between the king, his clergy, and the papacy, as Afonso II began to rebel against the conditions that were agreed upon between his predecessors and the Catholic Church. This battle between Afonso II and the Catholic Church culminated in Afonso's excommunication in 1219 and his death outside the bounds of the church. They also, however, helped Afonso to reestablish royal control and to create a stronger government. During his and Urraca's reign, the first written laws were promulgated in Portugal, meant to regulate private property, justice, and minting.

=== Portugal's Place in Europe ===
Afonso II and Urraca's reign also was marked by significant economic expansion and a growth in international trade, as the Kingdom of Portugal sent envoys to various European kingdoms in order to forge economic ties with them. These efforts, while initially modest, eventually would lead to Portugal's emergence as a maritime trading power in the later Middle Ages, and were part of Afonso's campaign to maintain and expand Portugal's status as an independent and assertive Iberian kingdom.

Urraca's time as Queen of Portugal thus was shaped by the battles that her husband waged against both his family and the Catholic Church. While there is little documentation of her own positions on these matters, it seems clear that Urraca and Afonso II were fairly close and aligned with each other, given that Afonso II entrusted the running of the kingdom to his queen in the event of his untimely death. While her reign as Queen of Portugal was a relatively short one, it came at a time when Portugal was experiencing the growing pains of being a newly independent kingdom that was learning just how much power it truly had. Working in concert with her husband, Urraca pushed the Kingdom of Portugal forward, while also leaving various problems for her son and his successors to solve in the future.

== Legacy ==
=== Children ===
Sancho I of Portugal

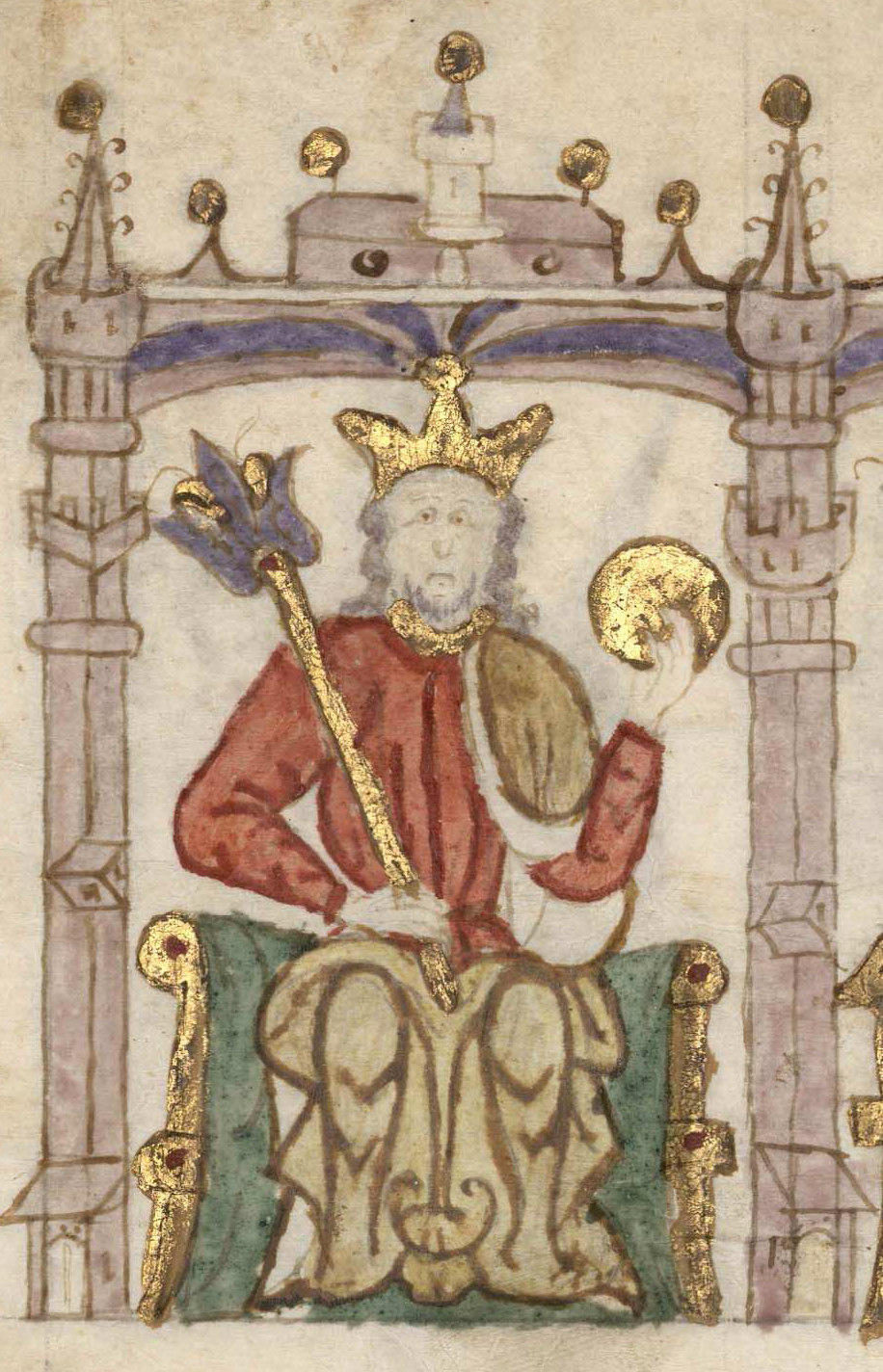
King Sancho II in the Semblanzas de reyes

Sancho II of Portugal, born on 8 September 1209, was the oldest of Urraca of Castile and Afonso's children. Following his father's death on 25 March 1223, Sancho succeeded to the throne at the age of thirteen, under the age of majority in Portugal which was fifteen. Desiring to distance himself from the sedentary rule of his father Afonso II, King Sancho recognized the importance of being regarded as a defender of the realm and faith by both the common people and papacy. The monarchy had long been at odds with the clergy, but Sancho believed that leading the Christian crusade against Muslim forces in the south would bolster the ministry's support of his kingship. King Sancho's devotion to the faith, during this stage of his rulership, aligns with Urraca's support of the Christian faith and its growth. Amid her queenship, Queen Urraca supported the mission of Franciscan friars in Portugal encouraging them to build Franciscan houses in Portuguese cities such as Lisbon and Alenquer. Both Urraca and her son, King Sancho II, felt it was important to gain papal support as monarchs.

During the time that King Sancho was hoping to gain approval of the papacy, King Sancho exiled his brother, Afonso, due to the failure of a plot to place Afonso on the throne. While Sancho promised the clergy and his citizens that he would be a staunch defender of the Christian faith, devoting himself to warfare against his enemies, it soon became clear that his thoughts were not on battle. Rather, King Sancho became interested in a recently widowed noblewoman, Mécia Lopes de Haro. The two soon wed to the scandal of many due to their close family ties. Increasing papal dislike for the king as well as Afonso's sudden return from France, where he had been living since Sancho's dismissal, led to a papal bill being issued on 12 February, perhaps at the behest of Afonso, commanding the clergy to annul the marriage between King Sancho and Mécia. Following this bill, on 25 July 1248, Pope Innocent IV issued a formal bill of deposition. Afonso acted as regent of the kingdom during this time and eventually would take up the crown as king Afonso III of Portugal. King Sancho II of Portugal, deprived of power and a kingdom, died in exile on 4 January 1248 in Toledo, Spain where his cousin, Urraca's nephew, Ferdinand III reigned.

Afonso III of Portugal

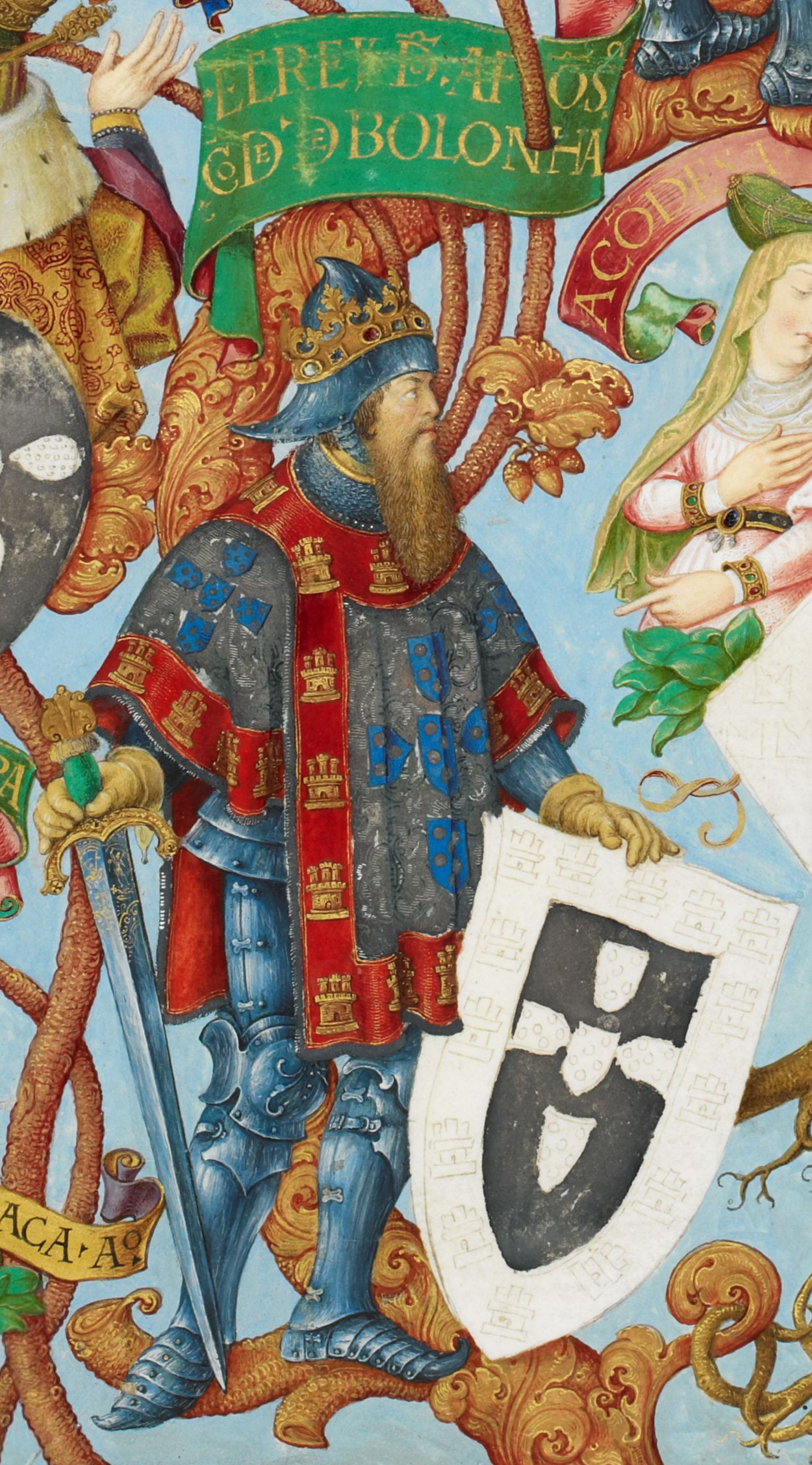
Afonso III in Genealogy of the Kings of Portugal (António de Holanda, 1530–1534)

Afonso III of Portugal, born on 5 May 1210, was the second son of Urraca of Castile and King Afonso II of Portugal. At a young age, Alfonso was welcomed into the French Court due largely to the Queen of France, Blanche of Castile, who was his maternal aunt (Urraca of Castile's sister). Afonso's strong connection to his mother's Castilian side is clear in his upbringing as his aunt, Queen Blanche, and cousin, King Louis IX, looked after Afonso during his long time away from Portugal. While entertaining Afonso in the French court, Queen Blanche also found Afonso a wife, Matilda II, Countess of Boulogne. This marriage in 1238 granted Afonso the title, Count of Bologne. Afonso spent much of his early life in France with his mother's side of the family, but made his way back to Portugal due to his brother, King Sancho II's shaky position as king. In 1248, Afonso took over as regent for his brother who had been deposed. Though at first Afonso seemed to represent foreign power which led to distrust by the people, his improvements and additions to Portugal, including the founding of monasteries and nunneries, brought him much respect and a good reputation. Afonso's struggles regarding his "foreign" status, though he was born in Portugal, parallel struggles that his mother, Urraca, may have faced as a foreign queen. Though of noble Castilian and English birth, Queen Urraca was not Portuguese which allowed for a distance or remoteness between her, the nobles, and the common people of Portugal when she became queen. This is most likely how King Afonso III, and the common people, felt during his succession to the throne of Portugal more than four decades after his mother.

King Afonso's positive reputation was questioned when he desired to marry Beatrice of Castile while his previous wife, Matilda of Boulogne, was still alive. This greatly upset the papacy, who had been supporters of Afonso since his ascension, and led to the marriage between the king and Beatrice, which occurred in 1253, to be delegitimized until after Maud's death in 1258. Afonso III had to focus on more than internal issues as the Portuguese reconquest had not been completed by his brother, King Sancho, when Afonso ascended to the throne. The papacy, which had largely been the catalyst in Afonso's ascension, expected King Afonso to complete the Portuguese recapture of the Holy Land and, recognizing the importance of papal support, King Afonso succeeded. After more than thirty years on the throne, King Afonso III of Portugal died on 16 February 1279, at the age of 68. Afonso is buried at Alcobaça Monastery in Alcobaça, Portugal alongside his wife Queen Beatrice of Castile as well as parents Urraca of Castile and Afonso II.

Eleanor of Portugal Queen of Denmark

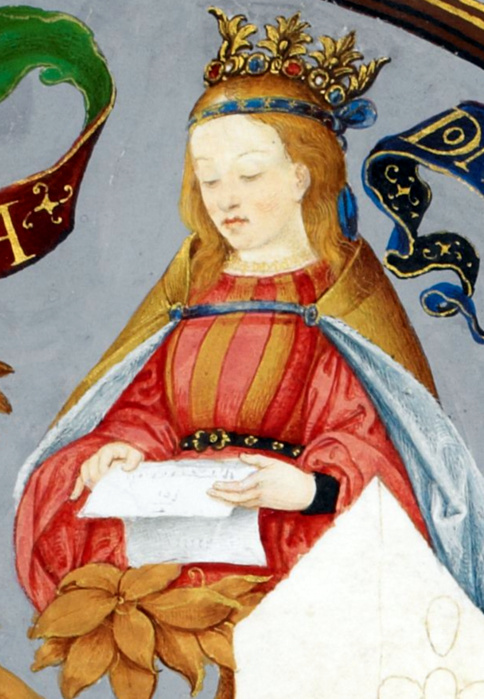
Eleanor in António de Holanda's Genealogy of the Kings of Portugal, c. 1530–34

Eleanor of Portugal, born circa 1211, was the sole daughter of Alfonso II of Portugal and Urraca of Castile. Similar to Urraca, little is known about her life due to her untimely death. At the age of 18, Eleanor married Valdemar the Young, son of King Valdemar II of Denmark, in Ribe, Denmark on 24 June 1229. Two years later, on 28 August 1231, Eleanor died in childbirth at the age of 19 or 20. Much of Eleanor's life mirrors that of her mother Urraca. Both became queen consorts at a young age, were sent to live in another country, and died with little information about their lives left behind. Eleanor was buried in St. Bendt's Church in Ringsted, Denmark and examinations of Eleanor's skeleton showed possible cancer in her bones which may have contributed to her early death. Supposedly, a small leaden coffin was found at the foot piece of Eleanor's grave containing the bones of a six month old child. This would suggest that the infant's remains are of a child of Eleanor and Valdemar, though the only possible child of the two is Sophie Valdemarsdottir of which hardly any information can be found except a possible death date of 1241. This death date would not correspond with the six month old infant in Eleanor's grave so her possible children remain a mystery.

Fernando, Lord of Serpa

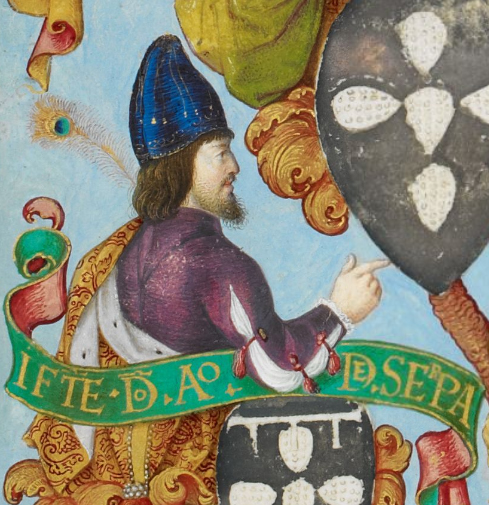
Fernando in António de Holanda's Genealogy of the Kings of Portugal, c. 1530–34

Fernando, born in 1217, was the youngest child of Urraca of Castile and King Afonso II of Portugal. Fernando was granted the titles Lord of Serpa and Lord of Lamego in 1223 at the age of six, and was largely known as the former. Fernando led troops of his own and acted as lieutenant to his brother, King Sancho III of Portugal, during the Portuguese reconquest of the Holy Lands, but was disliked by the papacy due to his violent ways, enough so that he was excommunicated in 1237. Though excommunicated, Fernando's violent actions did not cease. Conflict had broken out over the election of Bishop Estevão Gomes due to King Sancho's obvious involvement in the clergyman's rise to power. Due to this, Estevão was eventually deposed and João Rolis, dean of Lisbon elected in his place. Rather than quelling the conflict, the election of João led to further partisan fighting. In a tragic event, Fernando incited a riot on holy ground resulting in deaths. Fernando's remorse due to his actions during this conflict led him to seek absolution in Rome. The Lord of Serpa was granted a heavy penance, which included financial restitutions, apologies, and promises to continue fighting on the frontier. Other than Fernando's military actions, there is not much information regarding his early life nor his personal life, similar to his mother, Urraca. He is known to have married Sancha de Lara, daughter of Fernando Núñez de Lara and wife Mayor González, in 1241, though without documentation and the marriage was childless. It is proposed he had an illegitimate child named Sancho Fernandes de Serpa, who was a Prior at Santo Esteban de Alfama, though this is not definite. Fernando, Lord of Serpa died on 19 January 1246 at the age of 29 in Portugal.

=== Burial ===
Alcobaça Monastery

Queen Urraca of Castile is buried alongside her husband, King Afonso II of Portugal, at Alcobaça Monastery in Alcobaça, Portugal. Her son, Afonso III of Portugal, and his second wife, Beatrice of Castile, are also interred in the monastery. Much of Urraca's Castilian family are buried in Santa Maria de Las Huelgas, a Cisterian convent in Burgos, Spain, where her sister, Constanza, was a nun and the family regularly visited. That being said, Urraca's burial away from her family is not out of the ordinary, as queens tended to be interred together with their husbands. The Monastery of Alcobaça was established by King Afonso I of Portugal, the grandfather of Urraca's husband, Afonso II of Portugal, in 1153. The large monastic complex was gifted to the Cistercians, the same religious order that inhabited Santa Maria de Las Huelgas, to recognize their support of King Afonso I's conquest of Santarem. This gift was granted with the understanding that the monks would work and colonize the lands surrounding the church. The monastery looks largely the same as it did during Urraca's lifetime as no major alterations to the building have been made.

Tomb of Inês de Castro at Alcobaça Monastery

There are no definitive pictures of Urraca's tomb, though her sarcophagus most likely mirrors those of the other intricately carved coffins present in Alcobaça Monastery. The sarcophagus of Urraca's daughter-in-law, Beatrice of Castile, features complex and well-preserved carvings of men on the sides of the coffin and a relief of Beatrice lying on the top. Also present in the monastery are the tombs of King Pedro I, great-great-grandson of Urraca, and his mistress, Inês de Castro, some of the best representations of Gothic sculpture in Portugal. King Pedro and Inês' tombs feature lions, saintly reliefs, scenes from the couples life, as well as events from the life of Christ. Both life-size reliefs of Pedro and Inês are carried by angels. While Urraca's sarcophagus is most likely not this intricate, elements of both Queen Beatrice's coffin as well as Inês de Castro could be present on Urraca's tomb.

== Issue ==
- Sancho II of Portugal
- Afonso III of Portugal
- Eleanor of Portugal, Queen of Denmark
- Fernando, Lord of Serpa

Urraca of Castile, Queen of Portugal Castilian House of Ivrea Cadet branch of the House of Ivrea Born: 1186/28 May 1187 Died: 3 November 1220
Royal titles
Preceded by Dulce of Aragon	Queen consort of Portugal; 1211–1220	Succeeded by Mécia Lopes de Haro
