= Afonso II of Portugal =

King of Portugal from 1211 to 1223

Afonso II
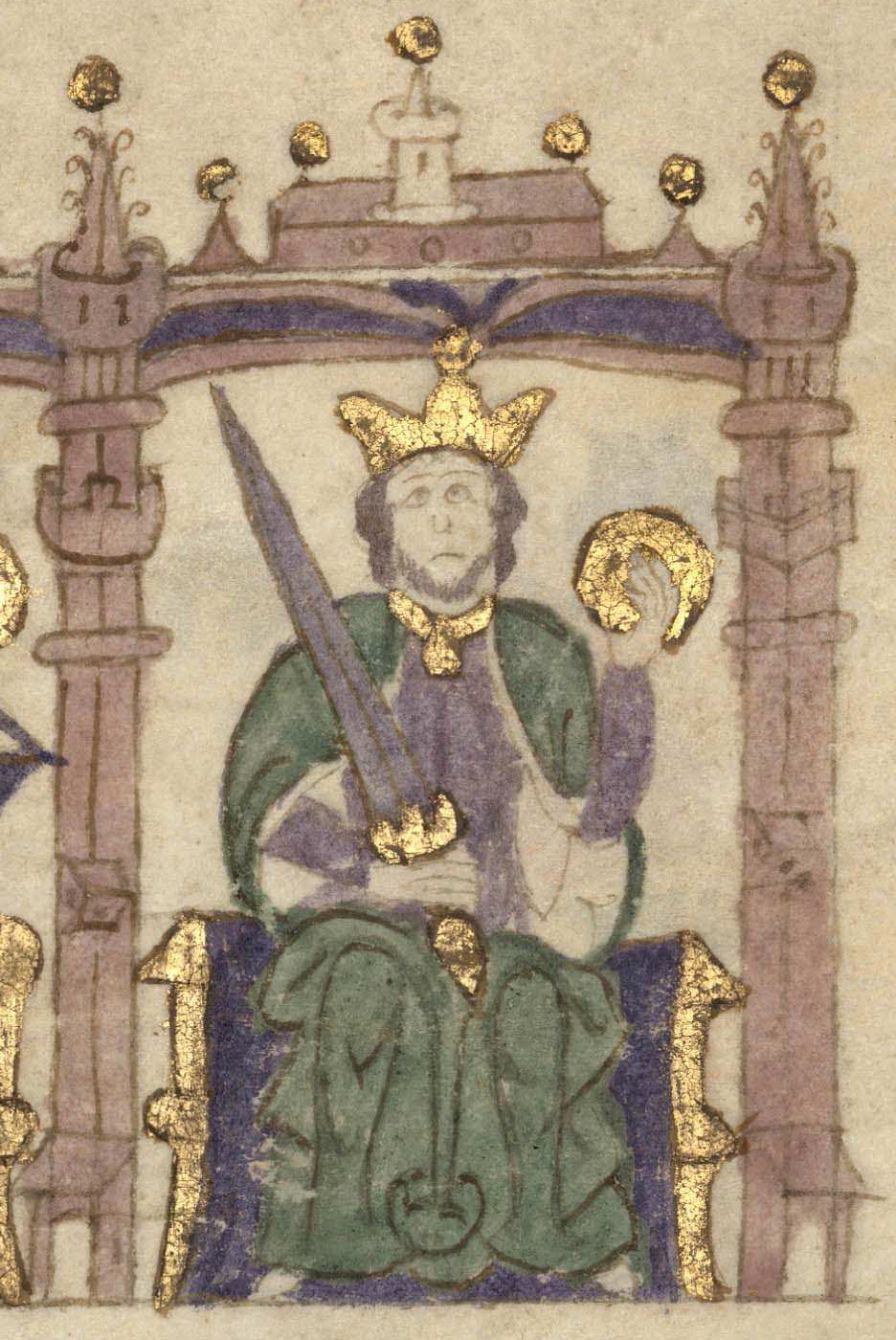
- King Afonso in the Castilian manuscript Compendium of Chronicles of Kings, c. 1312–1325

King of Portugal
- Reign: 26 March 1211 – 25 March 1223
- Predecessor: Sancho I
- Successor: Sancho II
- Born: Afonso Sanches; 23 April 1185; Coimbra, Kingdom of Portugal
- Died: 25 March 1223 (aged 37); Coimbra, Kingdom of Portugal
- Burial: Alcobaça Monastery
- Spouse: Urraca of Castile (m. 1206; died 1220)
- Issue among others...: Sancho II, King of Portugal; Afonso III, King of Portugal; Leonor, Queen of Denmark; Fernando, Lord of Serpa
- House: Burgundy
- Father: Sancho I of Portugal
- Mother: Dulce of Aragon

Afonso II (Afonso Sanches; 23 April 1185 – 25 March 1223), also called Afonso the Fat (Afonso o Gordo) and Afonso the Leper (Afonso o Gafo), was King of Portugal from 1211 until 1223. Afonso was the third monarch of Portugal.

Afonso was the second but eldest surviving son of Sancho I of Portugal and Dulce of Aragon. Afonso succeeded his father on 27 March 1211.

== Reign ==
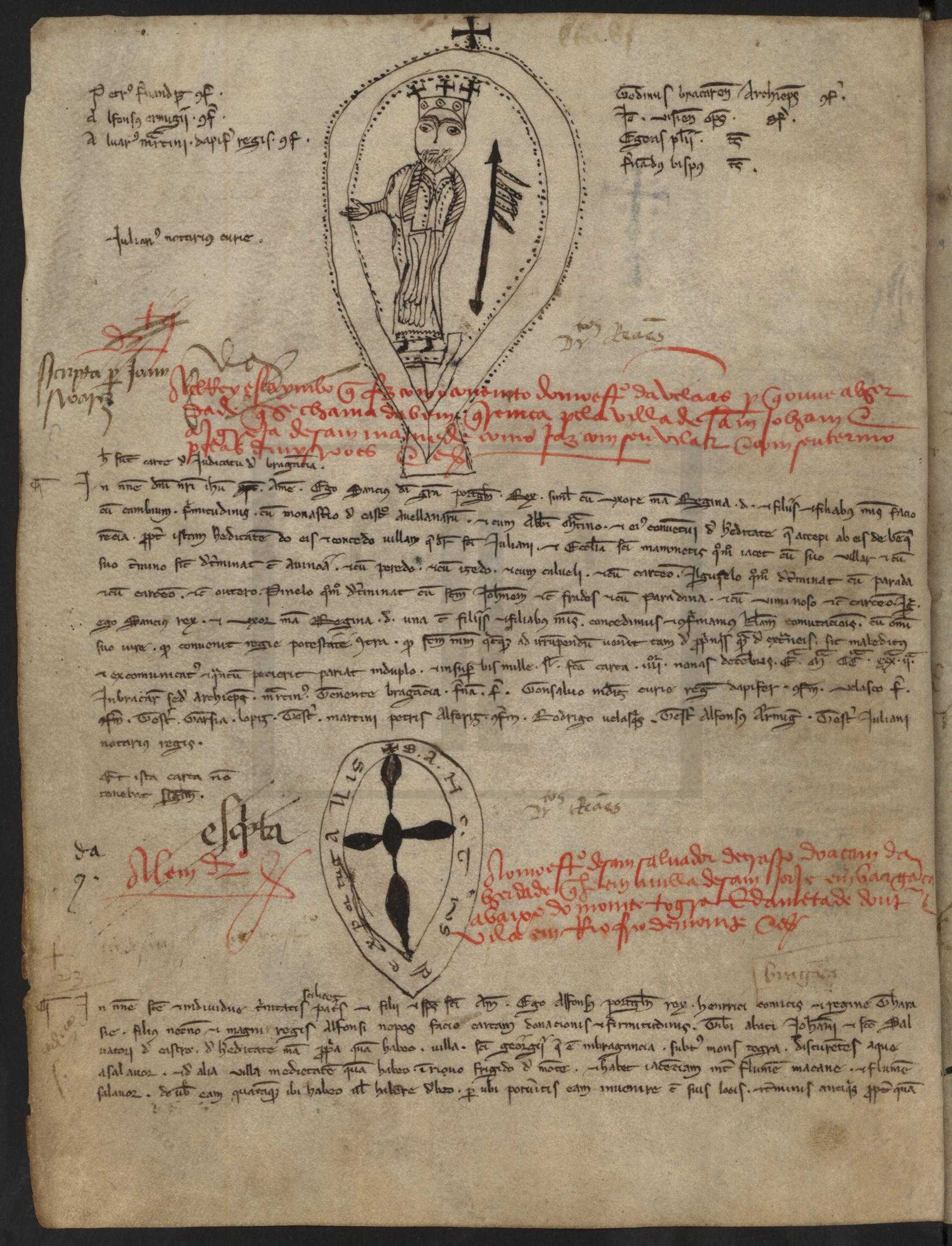
Afonso II as depicted in a 13th-century manuscript.

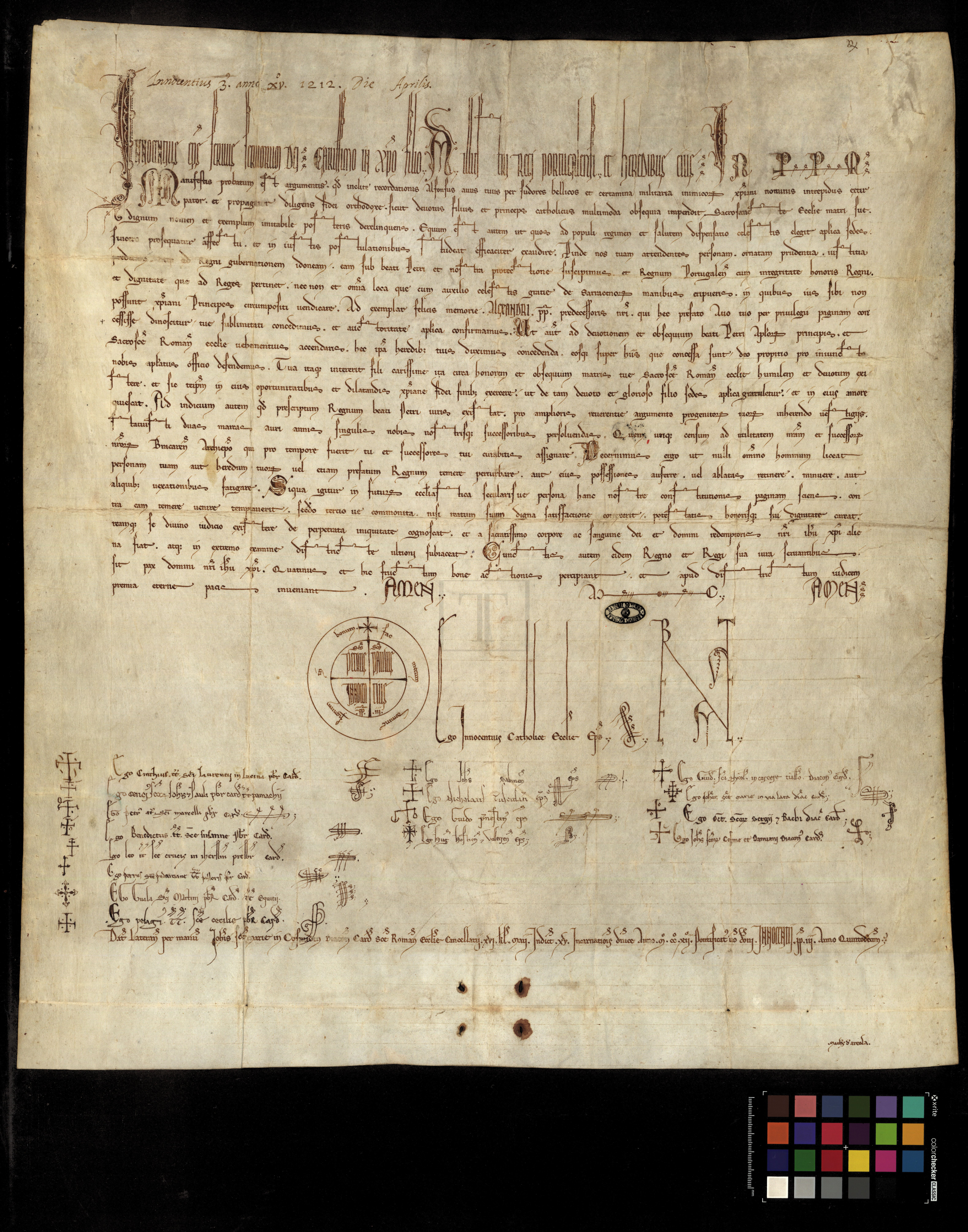
Bull Manifestis Probatum issued by Pope Innocent III on April 16, 1212, addressed to Afonso confirming the earlier papal bull of Pope Alexander III to Afonso Henriques which recognized Portugal as a kingdom

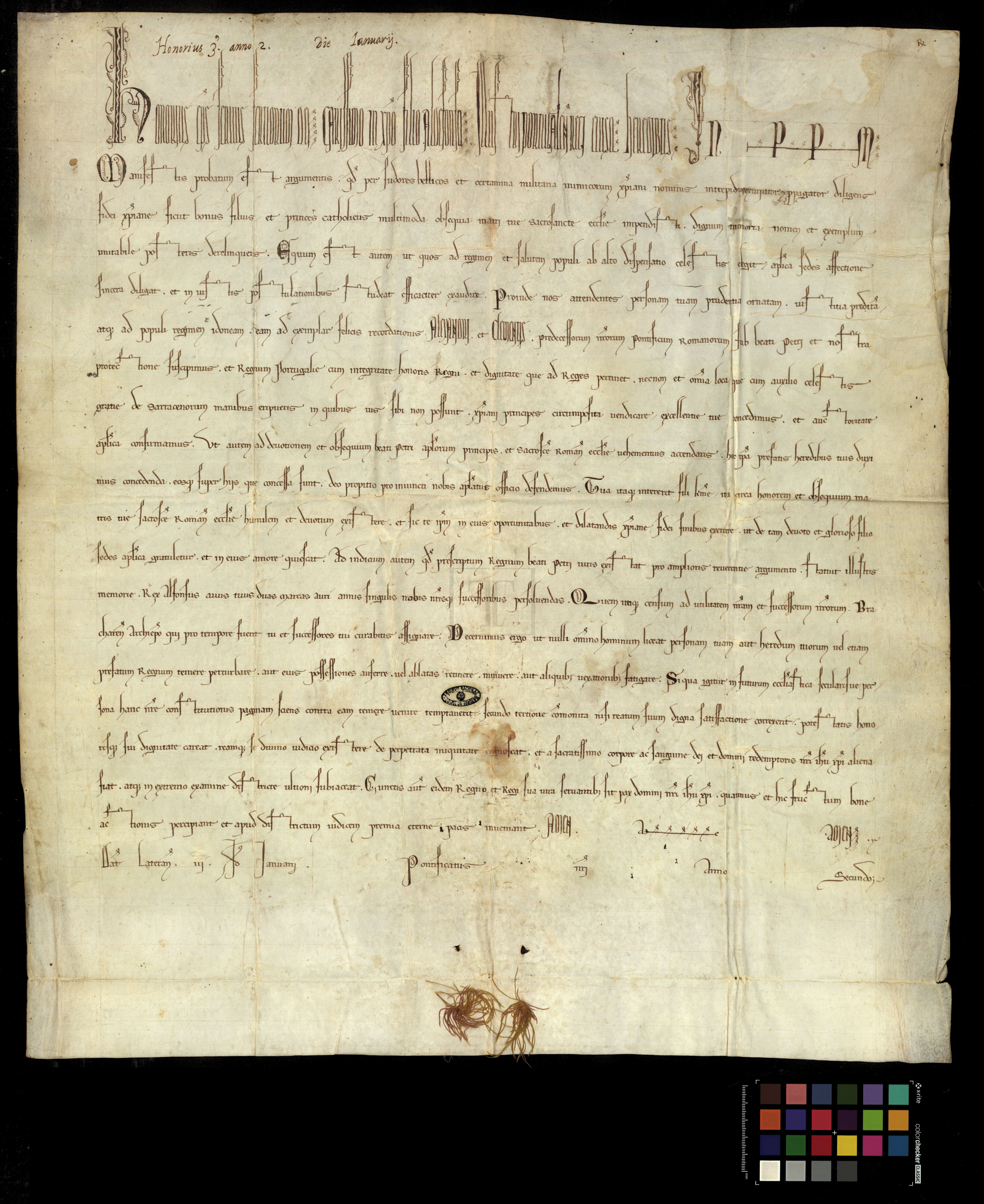
Later bull Manifestis Probatum est issued by Pope Honorius III on January 11, 1218, to Afonso confirming again the bull Manifestis Probatum

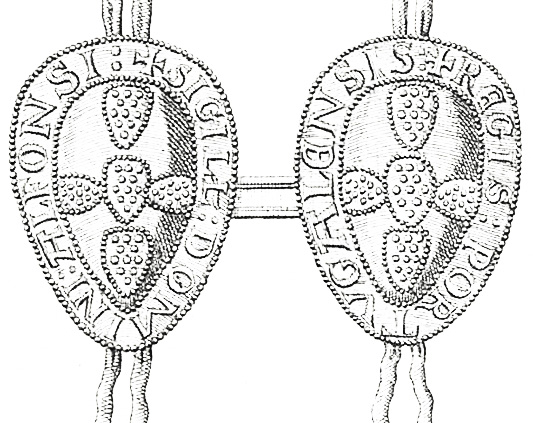
Seals of Afonso II.

As a king, Afonso II set a different approach of government. Hitherto, his father Sancho I and his grandfather Afonso I were mostly concerned with military issues either against the neighbouring Kingdom of Castile or against the Moorish lands in the south. Afonso did not pursue territory enlargement policies and managed to ensure peace with Castile during his reign. Despite this, some towns were conquered from the Moors by the private initiative of noblemen and clergy, as when Bishop Soeiro Viegas initiated the conquest of Alcácer do Sal. This does not mean that he was a weak or somehow cowardly man. The first years of his reign were marked instead by internal disturbances between Afonso and his brothers and sisters. The king managed to keep security within Portuguese borders only by outlawing and exiling his kin.

Since military issues were not a government priority, Afonso established the state's administration and centralized power on himself. He designed the first set of Portuguese written laws. These were mainly concerned with private property, civil justice, and minting. Afonso also sent ambassadors to European kingdoms outside the Iberian Peninsula and began amicable commercial relations with most of them.

In 1220, Afonso instituted inquirições to investigate the nature of holdings and to recover whatever had been illegally taken from the crown. This issue was in response to the church's rein over Portuguese land as they supported Afonso's fight in the civil war with Sancho II. These included examination of local noble titles and rights, including investigation of properties, lands and incomes against royal charters that had been issued.

Other reforms included the always delicate matters with the pope. In order to get the independence of Portugal recognized by Rome, his grandfather, Afonso I, had to legislate an enormous number of privileges to the Church. These eventually created a state within the state. With Portugal's position as a country firmly established, Afonso II endeavoured to weaken the power of the clergy and to apply a portion of the enormous revenues of the Catholic Church to purposes of national utility. These actions led to a serious diplomatic conflict between the pope and Portugal. After being excommunicated for his audacities by Pope Honorius III, Afonso II promised to make amends to the church, but he died in Coimbra on 25 March 1223 before making any serious attempts to do so.

King Afonso was buried originally at the Monastery of Santa Cruz in Coimbra where his body remained for nearly ten years. His remains were transferred subsequently to Alcobaça Monastery, as he had stipulated in his will. He and his wife, Queen Urraca, were buried at its Royal Pantheon.

== Marriage and descendants ==
In 1206, he married Urraca, daughter of Alfonso VIII of Castile and Eleanor of England. The couple were both descendants of King Alfonso VI of León. The offspring of this marriage were:

- Sancho II (8 September 1207 – 4 January 1248), king of Portugal;
- Afonso III (5 May 1210 – 16 February 1279), king of Portugal;
- Eleanor (1211–1231), queen of Denmark
- Ferdinand (1218–1246), lord of Serpa

Out of wedlock, he had two illegitimate sons:

- João Afonso (d. 9 October 1234), buried in the Alcobaça monastery;
- Pedro Afonso (d. after 1249), who accompanied his brother King Afonso in the conquest of Faro in 1249. He had an illegitimate daughter named Constança Peres.

== See also ==
- Timeline of Portuguese history (First Dynasty)
- Portugal in the Middle Ages
  - Portugal in the Reconquista
  - Siege of Alcácer do Sal

== Bibliography ==
- Caetano de Souza, Antonio (1735). Historia Genealógica de la Real Casa Portuguesa (PDF) (in Portuguese). Vol. I. Lisbon: Lisboa Occidental, na oficina de Joseph Antonio da Sylva. ISBN 978-84-8109-908-9.
- Carvalho Correia, Francisco (2008). O Mosteiro de Santo Tirso de 978 a 1588: a silhueta de uma entidade projectada no chao de uma história milenária (in Portuguese). Santiago de Compostela: Universidade de Santiago de Compostela: Servizo de Publicacións e Intercambio Científico. ISBN 978-84-9887-038-1. Archived from the original on 4 October 2013.
- Rodrigues Oliveira, Ana (2010). Rainhas medievais de Portugal. Dezassete mulheres, duas dinastias, quatro séculos de História (in Portuguese). Lisbon: A esfera dos livros. ISBN 978-989-626-261-7.
- Sotto Mayor Pizarro, José Augusto (1997). Linhagens Medievais Portuguesas: Genealogias e Estratégias (1279–1325) (in Portuguese). Oporto: Doctorate thesis, author's edition. hdl:10216/18023.

Afonso II of Portugal House of Burgundy Cadet branch of the Capetian dynasty Born: 23 April 1185 Died: 25 March 1223
Regnal titles
Preceded by Sancho I	King of Portugal; 1211–1223	Succeeded by Sancho II
