= Sancho II of Portugal =

King of Portugal from 1223 to 1247

Sancho II
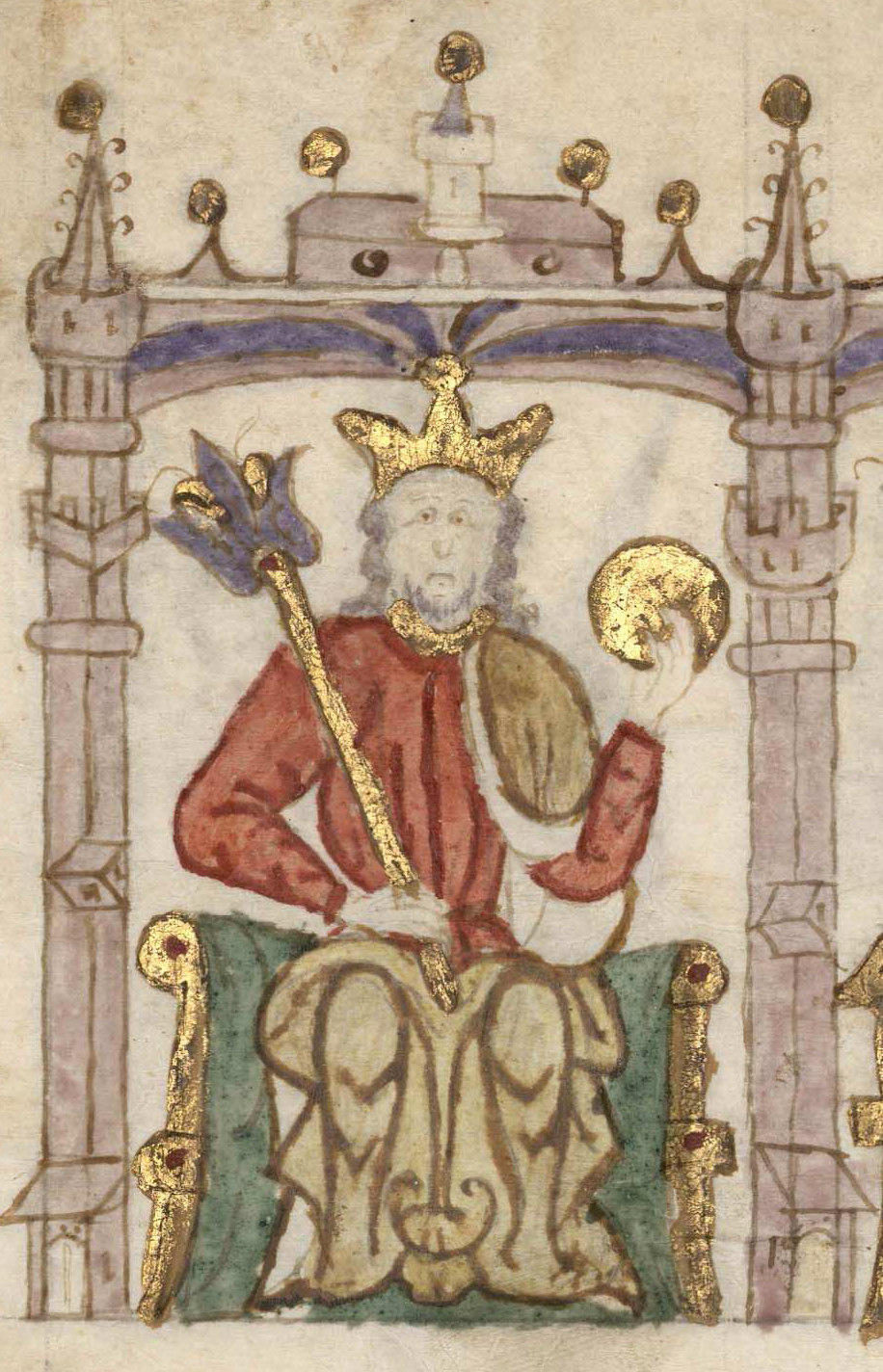
- King Sancho in the Castilian manuscript Compendium of Chronicles of Kings, c. 1312–1325

King of Portugal
- Reign: 25 March 1223 – 4 December 1247
- Predecessor: Afonso II
- Successor: Afonso III
- Born: 8 September 1207; Coimbra, Kingdom of Portugal
- Died: 4 January 1248 (aged 40); Toledo, Kingdom of Castile
- Burial: Cathedral of Toledo
- Spouse: Mécia Lopes de Haro (m. c. 1243–45)
- House: Burgundy
- Father: Afonso II of Portugal
- Mother: Urraca of Castile

Sancho II (Sancho Afonso; 8 September 1207 – 4 January 1248), nicknamed Sancho the Cowled or Sancho the Capuched (Sancho o Capelo), alternatively, Sancho the Pious (Sancho o Piedoso), was King of Portugal from 1223 to 1248.

Sancho was born in Coimbra, the eldest son of Afonso II of Portugal by his wife, Urraca of Castile. He ascended the throne after his father's death on 25 March, 1223.

He was succeeded on the Portuguese throne by his brother, King Afonso III, in 1248.

== Military career and reign ==
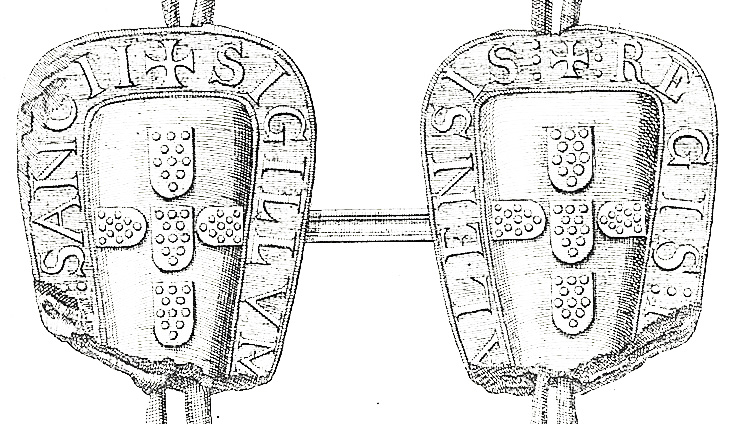
Seal of Sancho II.

By the time of his accession to the throne, in 1223, Portugal was embroiled in a difficult diplomatic conflict with the Catholic Church. His father, Afonso II, had been excommunicated by Pope Honorius III, for his attempts at reducing the Church's power within the country. A treaty of 10 articles was signed between the Pope and Sancho II, but the king paid little attention to its fulfillment. His priority was the Reconquista, the reconquest of the southern Iberian Peninsula from the Moors. From 1236 onwards, Sancho II conquered several cities in the Algarve and Alentejo, securing the Portuguese position in the region.

== Dispossession from throne ==
Sancho II proved a capable commander but, with regard to equally important administrative issues, he was less competent. With his total attention focused on military campaigns, the ground was open for internal disputes. The nobility was displeased by the king's conduct and started to conspire against him. Moreover, the middle class of merchants quarrelled frequently with the clergy, without any intervention from the king. As a result, the bishop of Porto made a formal complaint to the pope about this state of affairs. Since the Church was the dominant power of the 13th century, Pope Innocent IV felt free to issue bull Grandi non immerito, ordering the Portuguese to choose a new king to replace the so-called heretic.

In 1246, recalcitrant nobles invited Sancho's brother Afonso, Count of Boulogne, to take the throne. Afonso immediately abdicated from his French possessions and marched into Portugal.

== Exile and death ==
After a civil war lasting from late 1245 to mid 1247 and a Castilian intervention by the Castilian heir, Prince Alfonso, he fled in exile to Toledo, Spain when Alfonso retreated his forces to support his father in the siege of Seville. He died in Toledo on 4 January 1248 and was buried in its cathedral.

== Marriage ==
Sancho married, circa 1240, a Castilian lady, Mécia Lopes de Haro, widow of Alvaro Peres de Castro, and daughter of Lope Díaz II de Haro and Urraca Alfonso de León, an illegitimate daughter of Alfonso IX of León, but they had no legitimate sons.

== See also ==
- Timeline of Portuguese history (First Dynasty)
- Portugal in the Middle Ages

Sancho II of Portugal House of Burgundy Cadet branch of the Capetian dynasty Born: 8 September 1207 Died: 4 November 1248
Regnal titles
Preceded by Afonso II	King of Portugal; 1223–1248	Succeeded by Afonso III
