= List of fictional Jews =

This is a list of fictional Jews, characters from any work of fiction whose Jewish identity has been noted as a key component of the story or who have been identified impacting or reflecting cultural views about Jewish people.

Year of first publication	Character(s)	Work	Creator	Media	Country of publication	Details
Traditional	Wise Men of Chelm	Ashkenazi Jewish folklore	Traditional	Folk tales	Europe	Within Jewish humor, the stock characters of the Wise Men of Chelm are foolish characters who are the subjects of jokes through their illogical reasoning. Their foolish logic places them in opposition to the Talmudic scholars who are highly regarded in the culture.
Traditional 13th Century	Wandering Jew	Christian folklore	Traditional	Folk tales	Europe	Inspired by the biblical passage Matthew 16:27, 28 in which Jesus states "Verily I say unto you, There be some standing here, which shall not taste of death, till they see the Son of man coming in his kingdom", stories have circulated since the Middle Ages about a Jew who interacted with Jesus and was still alive, awaiting the second coming. There are multiple variations of who the Wandering Jew is, such as a shopkeep who saw Jesus carrying his cross to be crucified and instead of showing compassion struck Jesus and told him to walk faster, and was thus cursed to wander the earth aging and finding no peace in death.
Traditional, perhaps as early as the 13th century	The Jew's Daughter	"Hugh of Lincoln" or "The Jew's Daughter"	Traditional, included in Volume 3 of Francis James Child's English and Scottish Ballads from a version transcribed by Bishop Thomas Percy in 1765	Song	England	Child collected over 20 versions of the ballad which recounts a tale of blood libel in which young boy, Sir Hugh, is lured by the Jew's daughter into her house (or castle depending upon the version) so that he can retrieve his ball that he had kicked into her window (or garden). Once in the house, the ballad says she ritually murders him to collect his blood for a ritual before throwing his body in a well where his mother finds it after his ghost calls out to her. While the boy in the ballad has been linked to Little Saint Hugh of Lincoln, both Child and Percy preface the ballad with a statement that as historical record, the tale is untrue.
1353	Abraham, Melchisedech	The Decameron (Decamerone)	Giovanni Boccaccio	Novella	Italy	Of the tales related by the characters in The Decameron, the second tells the story of Abraham, the wise Jew, who travels to The Vatican and notes the corruption there, yet upon returning home, converts to Christianity. In the third story Melchisedech is a Jewish money lender who is set up by the Sultan to identify which of the three religions of Judaism, Christianity, or Islam is the true religion. Melchisedech answers by telling a parable about an inheritance of true ring and two fake rings which leaves the answer in doubt, but satisfies the Sultan.
1589 or 1590	Barabas, Abigail	The Jew of Malta	Christopher Marlowe	Play	England	For Elizabethans, the character of the Jew, as presented in Barabas, is "an embodiment of all they loathe and fear, all that appears stubbornly, irreducibly different." The play became extremely popular, and Barabas has become a culturally iconic antisemitic representation of "avarice, egotism, duplicity and murderous cunning." Abigail, Barabas' beautiful daughter, converts to Christianity when she finds her father has duped her beloved into a fatal duel, and then becomes a nun to escape the sexual advances of a Friar. Barabas poisons her along with the rest of the nuns.
1596	Shylock, Jessica	The Merchant of Venice	William Shakespeare	Play	England	Shylock is "the most famous Jewish character in English" and embodies a number of the negative stereotypes of Jews. Shylock's daughter Jessica, inspired by Marlowe's Abigail in The Jew of Malta, converts to Christianity, although the conversion is questioned by other characters and represents the cultural ambivalence that the belief espoused by a "beautiful Jewess" may be simply superficial.
1609	Rahel la Fermosa	Jerusalén conquistada (Jerusalem Conquered)	Lope de Vega	Epic poem	Spain	In his faux historical narrative poem, Lope de Vega presents the character of Rahel la Fermosa (Rachel the beautiful) who has an affair with Alfonso VIII of Castile, before she is murdered by his courtiers as a threat to the emerging kingdom. The historicity of "The Jewess of Toledo", as Rahel is known, has been debated while the character has been recreated in numerous works, including the play The Jewess of Toledo (1851) by Franz Grillparzer, the silent film The Jewess of Toledo (1919) directed by Otto Kreisler, and the novel Die Jüdin von Toledo (1955) novel by Lion Feuchtwanger.
c. 1668	Mergata	The Jewish Bride or On Dimo, the Albanian Baker who Loved a Jewish Girl	Eremya Chelebi Kömürjian	Narrative poem	Ottoman Empire	The poem tells the story of how Dimo, an Albanian Christian boy kidnaps the Jewish Mergata from the city of Constantinople to his home town where he converts her and they are married by the Prince. Versions of the poem have been found in Armenian, Turkish and Greek. Some scholars believe that Eremya's depiction of the Jewish religion as being inferior to Christianity was a stand-in for a critique of the dominant Islamic religion.
1779	Nathan the Wise	Nathan the Wise (Nathan der Weise)	Gotthold Ephraim Lessing	Play	Germany	Nathan "is presented as an idealized mouthpiece for the Enlightenment principles of toleration and human fellowship."
1794	Sheva	The Jew	Richard Cumberland	Play	England	In apology for his previous negative portrayals of Jews, Cumberland presents Sheva as a "didactic good Jew", who, while outwardly appearing as a miser, is a secret philanthropist. Judith Page identifies Sheva as part of the stereotypical Jewish characters that appeared on the British stage at the time who were created by people "who simply do not know much about the subject" of Jews or Judaism.
1797	Adonah Ben Benjamin	The Algerine Captive	Royall Tyler	Novel	United States	Adonah Ben Benjamin is a wealthy Jewish banker in Algiers, who, for a price, promises to help the narrator, who has been captured into slavery in Algiers, return to freedom in the United States, but dies before being able to complete the process. Ben Benjamin is the first contemporaneous Jew to be depicted in an American novel.
1820	Isaac of York, Rebecca	Ivanhoe	Sir Walter Scott	Novel	England	Isaac is a money lender, and while presented with many negative characteristics stereotypical of Jewish villains, has been presented by Scott with "historical basis" for his greed. His daughter, Rebecca is at the center of a love triangle with the titular Ivanhoe, and Rowena, a gentile woman. Rebecca maintains both her religious faith and her virtue, and Ivanhoe marries Rowena.
1833	Rachel	Rachel; or, The Inheritance	Eugénie Foa	Novel	France	Foa presents her protagonist, Rachel, in a semi-autobiographical representation of Foa's life which includes a failed marriage and becoming a writer. Foa is one of the first Jewish women novelists in the world, and her sister was married to Fromental Halévy who wrote La Juive. Foa's later works include a number of historical romances in which the characters convert from Judaism, which Foa also did.
1835	Eléazar; Rachel, his foster daughter	La Juive	Fromental Halévy	Opera	France	In "the only great opera written by a Jew about a Jew", Eléazar is the Jewish father-figure of Rachel, the "Jewess" of the title, whom he had saved from the ruins of an estate when she was a baby and raised as his daughter. The opera became popular in France at a time when the theme of "The Jewess" and Jewish singers were popular.
1838	Fagin	Oliver Twist	Charles Dickens	Novel	England	Dickens' antisemitic introduction the character of Fagin notes his ugliness, wild red hair, and holding a toasting fork over a fire, all characteristics of the Christian Devil. Later editions of the novel have frequently been altered to use Fagin's name in place of Dickens' frequently-used descriptor "the Jew".
1843	Alick	Judah's Lion	Charlotte Elizabeth	Novel	England	Alick is a Jew who converts to Christianity, and as the novel ends, begins making plans for making a converted Jewish colony in Palestine a part of the British Empire.
1846	Inez Villena, Annie Montague	The Jewish Faith	Grace Aguilar	Instructional narrative	England	The anti-conversion work takes the form of a series of letters between the young Jewish woman Annie who is struggling with her faith, and the older Jewish woman, Inez, who instructs her in the benefits of the faith and provides guidance.
1848	Deborah	Deborah	Salomon Hermann Mosenthal	Play	Austria	In his stage play about a group of Jewish people seeking to establish a community in eastern Europe, Mosenthal, who was Jewish himself, presents the Jewish Deborah as a seductress in contrast to the "saint-like" Christian Hannah.
1863	Leah	Leah, the Forsaken	Augustin Daly	Play	England	Part of a series of plays on the English stage featuring Jewish women characters that were inspired by Mosenthal's Deborah, Leah, the Forsaken was a star vehicle for the Jewish actress Sarah Bernhardt. The play is also believed to have influenced the production of George Eliot's Daniel Deronda.
1865	Soloman Riah	Our Mutual Friend	Charles Dickens	Novel	England	Created by Dickens partly in response to the accusations of antisemitism he received for his character Fagin in Oliver Twist, Mr Riah is a Jewish moneylender who is shown as virtuous and admirable.
1876	Daniel Deronda	Daniel Deronda	George Eliot	Novel	England	Within the novel, Daniel discovers (on her deathbed) that his long-lost mother was Jewish and begins constructing his identity as a Jew.
1876	Clarel, Rolf, Vine, Abdon, Lyonese and others	Clarel	Herman Melville	Poem	United States	The narrative poem, about Clarel's visit to Jerusalem as he questions his religious faith, features a number of Jewish characters, some representing Melville's literary colleagues, others representing Jews from a variety of backgrounds, such as Abdon from India.
1880	Judah Ben-Hur	Ben-Hur: A Tale of the Christ	Lew Wallace	Novel, play, films, TV series	United States	Judah Ben-Hur is a first-century Jewish nobleman enslaved by the Romans. At the end of the novel he becomes a Christian.
1894	Bonshte	"Bonshte the Silent"	I. L. Peretz	Short story	Poland	The story of meek Bonshte "who never learned his worth" became an admonition to Jewish workers and one of many inspirations by Peretz for their social activism in Poland.
1894 (original story), 1957 (Perl's play), 1964 (Bock / Harnick/ Stein musical), 1971 (film)	Tevye	"Tevye Strikes It Rich" and other stories, Tevye and His Daughters, Fiddler on the Roof, Fiddler on the Roof (film)	Sholem Aleichem (short story), Arnold Perl (play), Jerry Bock/ Sheldon Harnick / Joseph Stein (musical), Norman Jewison (film director)	Short stories, play, musical, film	Russia, United States	Tevye was originally created by Sholem Aleichem and featured in a series of short stories in Yiddish. The character and his stories were recreated by numerous writers, including the stage play by Perl, which was turned into a musical by Bock, Harnick and Stien which was itself later adapted into a film directed by Jewison.
1894	Svengali	Trilby	George du Maurier	Novel	England	Svengali is a Jewish musician depicted distastefully as a hypnotist and exploiter of the young and impressionable Trilby.
1909	Rabbi Loew	The Wondrous Deeds of the Maharal of Prague with the Golem	Yudl Rosenberg	Short stories	Poland	Rosenberg published a work in which he presented the folklore that had grown up around Judah Loew ben Bezalel (also known as Maharal) in which he created a golem that protected the Jewish residents of the ghetto in Prague from violence and antisemitic attacks.
1909	Sadie Cohen	"Sadie Salome (Go Home)"	Irving Berlin and Edgar Leslie	Song	United States	Within the lyrics of the song, Sadie Cohen has become an exotic dancer performing as Salome in Dance of the Seven Veils, and she is admonished by her boyfriend in a Yiddish accent "That I am your lovin' Mose/Oy Oy Oy Oy / Where is your clothes?". Sadie became one of the on-stage persona used by the comedian Fanny Brice who had to learn the Yiddish accent for the part.
1912 (vaudeville), 1914 (phonograph recording), 1923 (film)	Samuel Cohen	"Cohen on the Telephone"; Cohen on the Telephone	Joe Hayman	Comic skit, comedy recording, film	England (skit), United States (recording, film)	The skit presented one side of a telephone conversation in which Cohen, a recent immigrant, had difficulty being understood because of his strong Yiddish accent and not understanding the customs of the new country. On the vaudeville stage, the skits were performed by a number of comedians, and variations of the skit were recorded on phonograph records beginning with Hayman in 1914 and continuing through a recording by Monroe Silver in 1942. and an early film version short "talkie" in 1923.
1913	Albert Bloch; Charles Swann	In Search of Lost Time (originally published in English as Remembrance of Things Past) (À la recherche du temps perdu)	Marcel Proust	Novel	France	Within the seven volumes of the novel, Bloch is initially presented as a "vulgar" Jew who is attempting to gain admittance to the upper circles of French society, while Swann is a Jewish man who has been assimilated to the point that he is a member of clubs that don't normally admit Jews. By the end of the novel, Bloch has assumed a new name and appearance, while Swann has claimed his cultural Jewish heritage as a result of the impact of the Dreyfus affair.
1918	Leopold Bloom	Ulysses	James Joyce	Novel	Ireland	Leopold Bloom is presented as an everyman. While Bloom's father had converted from Judaism, Jewish cultural markers play an important touchstones in his inner life as presented in the novel.
1925	Meyer Wolfshiem	The Great Gatsby	F. Scott Fitzgerald	Novel	United States	Meyer Wolfshiem is portrayed as the friend and mentor of the titular character Jay Gatsby. He is described as a gambler responsible for fixing the World Series who had made his money by bootlegging alcohol during Prohibition. Wolfsheim, described with unflattering stereotypical physical characteristics as well, is portrayed as an "alien" couter-pole to Anglo Tom Buchanan in Fitzgerald's presentation of America.
1926 (book, play and film)	Benya Krik	Odessa Tales (Одесские рассказы) (Collected short stories); Sunset (play); Benya Krik (film)	Isaak Babel	Novel, play, film	Russia	With the character of Benya Krik, Babel brought the "Jewish gangster" motif from folk tales to "high" literature, a tradition followed by a number of other artists, who also play on the mixture of "Russian, Yiddish, Odessa jargon and thieves' argot" that Krik speaks through their use of language to signal the Jewish gangster.
1926	Claude Levy	L'enfant prophète	Edmond Fleg	Novel	France	Claude Levy is a young Jewish boy growing up in Paris who seeks a spiritual life and is drawn towards Catholicism before embracing his Jewish roots at the advice of Jesus.
1926	Robert Cohn	The Sun Also Rises	Ernest Hemingway	Novel	United States	Cohn, a former collegiate boxer who attended Princeton when few Jews were admitted, does not fit in with his fellow expatriates in Paris who make antisemitic insults, falls in love with the same woman the narrator loves, and ends up getting into fights when he does not realize that she does not want to pursue a relationship with him.
1927	Jakie Rabinowitz, aka Jack Robin	The Jazz Singer	Alan Crosland (director); Alfred A. Cohn (writer)	Film	United States	In the story, Jakie runs away from home because his father, a cantor, wants Jakie to use his voice in service of God, but Jakie wants to become a popular singer. The Jazz Singer remains "one of the most intensely Jewish films ever released for a general audience.
1929 (radio); 1949 (Television)	Molly Goldberg	The Goldbergs	Gertrude Berg	Radio; Television	United States	Molly's portrayal was widely seen as an authentic representation of Jewish life in America and served as a "catalyst in the development of interfaith and interracial understanding"
1935	K'tonton	The Adventures of K'tonton	Sadie Rose Weilerstein	Children's books	United States	The stories of K'tonton, a boy the size of a thumb, which follow his adventures during Jewish holidays are among the first American Jewish children's stories to incorporate a sense of whimsy rather than simply instructing in moral values.
1936	Deborah Ber	Der sheydim tantz (Eng: The Devil's Dance), published in English as Deborah	Esther Kreitman	Novel	Poland	Deborah, a semi-autobiographical stand-in for Kreitman, chronicles the struggles of a woman with intellectual curiosity who because she is a woman, does not have access to study in the yeshiva. Kreitman's brother, I. B. Singer, later used a similar set up for his story Yentl the Yeshiva Boy.
1937	Hyman Kaplan	Short stories in The New Yorker which were gathered into the novel The Education of Hyman Kaplan and other novels	Leo Rosten	Short stories, novel	United States	Hyman Kaplan is a Jewish immigrant taking language classes at a night school. Rosten presents him in the tradition of language-based humor highlighting Kaplan's "tongue-in-cheek mistakes which, most of the time, spring from a calculated meeting of Yiddish with English".
1945	Debbie Brown	The Wasteland	Jo Sinclair	Novel	United States	Debbie Brown is the first lesbian main character in a novel by an American woman. In the novel, Debbie helps her brother deal with his feelings about being Jewish by recommending that he sees the psychiatrist that helped her deal with the fact that she is a lesbian.
1946 (short story), 1952 (novel)	Narrator, Mother, Father	"To a Country Town", Alien Son	Judah Waten	Short stories, later collected into a novel	Australia	In the semi-autobiographical stories, the narrator tells of his experiences as a young Jewish immigrant and his family after they have arrived in Australia shortly after the turn of the twentieth century. Events in the stories include the narrator being humiliated on behalf of his mother for whom he has to translate because she refuses to learn English.
1947 (novel and film)	Elaine Wales (aka Estelle Wilovsky)	Gentleman's Agreement (novel); Gentleman's Agreement (film)	Laura Z. Hobson, Moss Hart (screenplay)	Novel, film	United States	In both the novel and the film, the Jewish woman Estelle Wilovsky changes her name to Elaine Wales so that she can get a job as a secretary and ends up working for "Phil Greenberg", the fake Jewish persona that Gentile reporter Philip Green has taken on to experience antisemitism first hand for a column he will be writing. When she discovers that Greenberg is in fact a Christian, she is confronted with her own antisemitism and has been identified as an example of the self-hating Jew.
1948	Ezra ben Israel	Peony	Pearl S. Buck	Novel	United States	Ezra ben Israel and his family are part of the longstanding Jewish community living in the 1850s in the city of K'aifeng, China before its later dispersal and assimilation.
1951	Uncle Melech Davidson	The Second Scroll	A. M. Klein	Novel	Canada	An unnamed narrator, a Montreal journalist and editor, searches for his long-lost uncle, Melech Davidson, a messianic figure who has survived the Holocaust and struck out for Israel.
1955 (novel); 1958 (film)	Marjorie Morningstar	Marjorie Morningstar (novel); Marjorie Morningstar (film)	Herman Wouk (novel); Irving Rapper (director)	Novel, film	United States	In the character of Marjorie Morningstar who is the "ultimate bourgeois consumer" who wants a "big diamond engagement ring" and other possessions marking status, Wouk helped establish the stereotype of the Jewish American Princess.
1960	Isaac Edward Leibowitz; The Pilgrim (Benjamin Eleazar bar Yehoshua)	A Canticle for Leibowitz	Walter M. Miller, Jr.	Novel	United States	While he does not appear as a character in the story, the titular Leibowitz, a Jewish engineer, converted after a nuclear holocaust which devastated society and led to popular uprisings against technology which included the destruction of books. Within an isolated monastery, Leibowitz led the monks in their efforts to collect and preserve knowledge. The story of the novel initially follows Brother Francis Gerard who begins his journeys after an encounter with a nameless hermit, who is later identified as a Jew, and even later named as Benjamin Eleazar bar Yehoshua.
1961	Buddy Sorrell	The Dick Van Dyke Show	Carl Reiner	TV series	United States	When Reiner pitched the show, he was told to make it "accessible to the public" and so the ethnic backgrounds of the characters were initially glossed over with Sorrell's Jewish background not being discussed until last seasons of the show.
1961	2000 Year Old Man	2000 Years with Carl Reiner and Mel Brooks and others	Mel Brooks, Carl Reiner	Stand-up, audio recordings	United States	In the comedy skits, Mel Brooks portrays a 2000 year old Jewish man who responds to questions posed by an interviewer played by Reiner. The works play on the explicit "otherness" created by Brooks' presentation in the Yiddish accent of "the non-assimilated, foreign-born outsider.
1961	Danidin	The adventures of Dani, who can see but not be seen, and many other books	On Sarig	Children's books	Israel	Danidin, the protagonist of a series of children's books, has become invisible and uses his power to fight the enemies of Israel. Dani presents admirable traits such as learning to overcome fear, they also make comparisons equating Muslims to Nazi's.
1962 (short story); 1975 (play); 1983 (film)	Yentl	"Yentl the Yeshiva Boy"; Yentl (play); Yentl (film)	Isaac Bashevis Singer (short story); Singer and Leah Napolin (play); Barbra Streisand (film)	Short story, play, film	United States	Yentl is a Jewish girl in eastern Europe who disguises herself as a boy so that she can study the Talmud. While in Singer's presentation, Yentl's scholarly desires and physical description are seen as being something of a "freak of nature", in the film adaptation, Streisand presents Yentl's as natural and the restrictions placed by society as unnatural.
1963	Lawrence Breavman	The Favorite Game	Leonard Cohen	Novel	Canada	Breavman, based on Cohen, is a young aspiring Jewish artist from a wealthy family in Montreal who "considers himself a crossbreed of the French, the Jewish and the English" that make up the city, and struggles to come to terms with the Holocaust.
1963	Magneto (Max Eisenhardt)	Uncanny X-Men #1	Stan Lee Jack Kirby	Comic Book	United States	Magneto is a supervillain, sometimes antihero, and a longtime enemy of the X-Men. He was born with the mutant ability to control magnetism. Magneto is an Auschwitz survivor and fears that humanity will kill him and other mutants for being different the same way the Nazis killed the Jews. The character's early history has been compared with the lives of civil rights leader Malcolm X and Jewish Defense League founder Meir Kahane. In 2011, IGN ranked Magneto as the greatest comic book villain of all time.
1964	Rabbi Small	Friday the Rabbi Slept Late and other novels	Harry Kemelman	Novel	United States	Small was one of the first Jewish characters in American detective fiction. Kemelman presented him "almost completely in terms of his Jewish belief, and, as such, [he] is a genuinely new figure in detective fiction."
1966	Yakov Bok	The Fixer	Bernard Malamud	Novel	United States	Yakov Bok, modeled after Menahem Mendel Beilis is a Russian Jew who leaves the ghetto in search of work. When a young Christian boy is murdered, Bok is falsely arrested and charged with the crime.
1967	Sammy Burrman	The Meeting Point	Austin Clarke	Novel	Canada	During a therapy session as an adult, the Jewish Burrman recounts how as a child he let his black friend Jeffrey take the blame for an apple that Burrman had stolen. The incident caused the formerly multiracial youth gang to split up by ethnicity and continues to cause Burrman guilt.
1967 (novel); 1992 (TV film)	Genghis Cohn, Otto Schatz	La Danse de Genghis Cohn (novel); Genghis Cohn (TV film)	Romain Gary, Elijah Moshinsky (director); Stanley Price (screenplay)	Novel, TV film	France (novel), England (TV film)	In the story, Genghis Cohn is the ghost of a Jewish comedian who was killed in the Holocaust and comes back to haunt the former camp leader of Dachau, and eventually gets him to convert.
1969	Alexander Portnoy; Sophie Portnoy	Portnoy's Complaint	Philip Roth	Novel	United States	Roth's presentation of Portnoy as a Jew enthralled with sexual passions in opposition to images of moral and rational led to widespread discussions. Warren Rosenberg describes Portnoy as using his penis to break the barriers of being a "nice Jewish boy" and becoming an authentic "American male" Portnoy's mother Sophie is presented as a smothering Jewish mother, which Portnoy has feared will make him gay.
1969	Harold Hooper (Mr. Hooper)	Sesame Street	Joan Ganz Cooney (series creator); Will Lee (actor)	TV series	United States	The show occasionally alluded to Mr. Hooper being Jewish. One of the most specific occurrences is in the special Christmas Eve on Sesame Street when Bob wishes him a happy Hanukkah. His performer Will Lee was also Jewish.
1969 (novel); 1975 (East German-Czechoslovak film); 1999 (US film)	Jacob Heym	Jacob the Liar (Jakob der Lügner) (novel); Jacob the Liar (1975 film); Jakob the Liar (1999 film)	Jurek Becker (novel); Frank Beyer (dir 1975 film); Peter Kassovitz (dir 1999 film)	Novel, film	East Germany, East Germany-Czechoslovakia, United States	Jacob is the protagonist of the first novel in East Germany to deal with the Jewish experience of the Holocaust. The 1975 film portrays Jacob and the other characters in the ghetto as "fully Jewish and fully human" and the Nazi guards as "the other".
1972	Teresa	Morada interior	Angelina Muñiz-Huberman	Novel	Mexico	The story presents a fictionalized account of the 16th century Spanish mystic Santa Teresa de Jesus, a Spanish nun. In the novel, when she discovers that her ancestors were marrano, converted Jews, she escapes from Spain to Mexico to explore her Jewish roots.
1974	Nathan Zuckerman	My Life As a Man and other novels	Philip Roth	Novels	United States	Zuckerman, a character who appears in many of Roth's novels, is a Jewish writer. In The Ghost Writer, Zuckerman is surprised at the reception his book about Jewish characters receives in the Jewish community.
1974	Rhoda Morgenstern, Brenda Morgenstern, Ida Morganstern	Rhoda	James L. Brooks, Allan Burns	TV series	United States	Rhoda was the first Jewish female lead character of an American TV show since Molly Goldberg in 1955. Rhoda's sister, Brenda, was presented as a "very ethnic" counterpart to Rhoda, while their mother, Ida, was a stereotypical Jewish mother, pushing her daughters to get married and using guilt as a weapon.
1975	Moon Knight (Marc Spector)	Werewolf by Night #32	Doug Moench, Don Perlin	Comic Book	United States	Moon Knight is a superhero with dissociative identity disorder given power by the moon god Khonshu. The son of a rabbi, he was one of the first overtly Jewish comic book superheroes.
1976	Feiguele	Feiguele and Other Women (Feiguele y otras mujeres)	Cecilia Absatz	Novel	Argentina	As a teenager, Feiguele, the daughter of Jewish immigrants to Argentina, feels like an outsider because of her "unusual" name, her Jewish heritage, and the fact that her father only speaks Yiddish, not the local Spanish.
1977	Alvy Singer	Annie Hall	Woody Allen	Film	United States	In the film, Alvy Singer (Woody Allen), a neurotic, Jewish, twice-divorced comedian, directly addresses the audience and discusses his failed relationship with the Gentile, Annie Hall (Diane Keaton, who was dating Allen at the time) shares many characteristics with Allen. The film "and its interweaving of performer and persona, actual experience and fictional episode, personal pain and comic detachment, self-consciousness and self-expression is as complete a depiction of neurotic but cathartic Jewish inwardness as has ever been seen on a movie screen."
1977	Edmund Ziller	The Adventures of Edmund Ziller in the lands of the New World (Aventuras de Edmund Ziller en tieras del Nuevo Mundo)	Pedro Orgambide	Novel	Argentina	The novel, in a variety of formats, follows the character Edmund Ziller through various incarnations as he encounters important events in the discovery and history of the new world and highlights the impact that Jews have had on those events.
1979	Brian Cohen	Monty Python's Life of Brian	Monty Python	Film	England	Brian Cohen's life parallel's the life of Jesus, and while most film presentations of Jesus gloss over his Jewish identity, Brian proudly proclaims his Jewish background.
1980	Kitty Pryde	Uncanny X-Men #129 and other works by Marvel Comics	John Byrne, Chris Claremont	Comics	United States	Kitty Pryde was one of the first openly Jewish superheroes in a major comic label. In one storyline, she and Magneto bond over the loss of their relatives in The Shoah and speak at the United States Holocaust Memorial Museum.
1982	Tzili Kraus	Tzili	Aharon Appelfeld	Novella	Israel	Appelfeld created the Jewish girl Tzili as a character through which he could tell a story based on autobiographical elements of his own life and his escape from the Holocaust to Israel through what Joyce Carol Oates describes as an "eliptical, oblique, indirect art".
1982	Yonatan Lifshitz	A Perfect Peace (מנוחה נכונה)	Amos Oz	Novel	Israel	Yonatan, born and raised in a kibbutz, flees the stifling "utopian romanticism" of the Zionists of his parents' generation in a journey of self-discovery in the desert in the days leading up to the Six-Day War.
1982 (play); 1988 (film)	Arnold Beckoff	Torch Song Trilogy and the film adaptation	Harvey Fierstein	Play, film	United States	Within the story, Arnold's secular approach to life, along with his homosexuality, create conflict between him and his mother which drives the third act of the story, "Widows and Children First".
1982	Isak Jacobi	Fanny and Alexander (Fanny och Alexander)	Ingmar Bergman	Film	Sweden	Isak Jacobi rescues Fanny and Alexander from the "sterile" home of their strict Protestant step-father and brings them to his basement, a "world of fantasy, art and imagination." Earlier, as a point of "titillation" the film had shown that Alexander's grandmother Helena had had an affair with Isak, the "lowly Jew".
1984 (novel)	Heidi Abromowitz	The Life and Hard Times of Heidi Abramowitz (novel); Joan Rivers and Friends Salute Heidi Abramowitz (TV special)	Joan Rivers	Comedy sketches, novel, TV special	United States	Heidi Abromowitz was a character created by Rivers for her stand up routines, who, in contrast to being a "nice Jewish girl," was a "liberated whore with a heart of gold".
1985 (film)	Greg Gardner	A Chorus Line	Arnold Schulman (film screenplay)	Film	United States	Greg Gardner quips about being a "double minority" because he is Jewish and gay.
1986 (novel); 1990 (miniseries); 2017 (film)	Stanley Uris	It (novel)	Stephen King	Novel	United States	12-year-old Stanley "Stan" Uris was Jewish and extremely skeptical. His parents didn't follow the practice very strictly, resulting in him not knowing what it meant to be kosher. Antisemite bully Henry Bowers and his gang repeatedly persecuted Stan, once by whitewashing his face in snow until it bled. At age 39, he killed himself by slitting his wrists in a bathtub to get out of fighting the ancient evil clown It. Since he was the most afraid of It out of his childhood friends, his reasoning quickly became clear.
1987	Michael Steadman	thirtysomething	Marshall Herskovitz, Edward Zwick	TV series	United States	The show featured several plotlines where Michael sought to "maintain his connections to Judaism."
1987	Hillela Capran	A Sport of Nature	Nadine Gordimer	Novel	South Africa	The story follows Hillela, a Jewish woman born in South Africa, who was known as Kim while in school. Hillela reclaims her Jewish lineage by dropping the name Kim. She later has a relationship and a daughter with a black African revolutionary. After he dies, Hillela becomes one of the wives of another black man who becomes President of a fictional African country and is given the name African name Chiemeka. In the character's changing of names with the changing of identities, Louise Yelin says the novel explores "whether or how Jewish, English-speaking white writers in South Africa can become African writers".
1989	Krusty the Clown, aka Herschel Krustovsky	The Simpsons	Matt Groening	Animated television series	United States	In the episode Like Father, Like Clown, Krusty is revealed to have been passing as a gentile and "self-censor[ing]" his Jewish identity in a manner similar to the Hollywood movie moguls of the early 20th Century.
1989	Jerry Seinfeld, Tim Whatley, Rabbi Krischbaum, Kessler	Seinfeld	Larry David, Jerry Seinfeld	TV series	United States	The character of Jerry Seinfeld is "a New York Jew, a sarcastic, wisecracking cynic with an overbite, living on the margin of the middle state." In one episode, Jerry is upset that his dentist, Tim Whatley, has converted to Judaism so that he can tell Jewish jokes. Rabbi Kirschbaum, who publicly exposed on his cable TV show personal secrets that Elaine Benes had told to him, was a "unique" negative portrayal of a Rabbi on American TV. In the pilot, Jerry's neighbor was initially the Jewish Kessler, but was changed to non-Jewish Cosmo Kramer in part because Brandon Tartikoff had thought the show was "too New York," "too Jewish" for the mainstream American public.
1990	Hadara	Flying Lessons (Maurice Cheviv'el Melamed La'oof)	Nava Semel	Young adult novel	Israel	A young girl growing up in a small Israeli village whose mother has died, hears stories from a neighbor about flying through the air that she initially believes are about a secret life as a circus performer but later understands that it was how he survived a concentration camp.
1991	Linda Richman	Saturday Night Live	Mike Myers	Comedy sketches	United States	Myers cross dressed to portray Richman, the host of a talk show "Coffee Talk" in recurring skits on SNL, who embodied extreme caricatures of Jewish women, including her use of Jewish phrases, such as verklempt and over-the-top passion for the real life performer Barbra Streisand.
1992	Sara Goode, Gorgeous Teitelbaum, Pfeni Rosensweig, Mervyn Kant	The Sisters Rosensweig	Wendy Wasserstein	Play	United States	The play deals with the issues of cultural assimilation, with conflicts arising between Sara's aspirations for assimilation and Gorgeous and Mervyn embracing their Jewish identity.
1992	Dolly	Dolly City	Orly Castel-Bloom	Novel	Israel	In the violent fantasy Dolly City, the protagonist, Dolly, carves the map of the state of Israel on the back of her baby son so that he will know the borders of the land he will be protecting when he grows up to join the Israeli army.
1993	Fran Fine, Sylvia Fine	The Nanny	Fran Drescher, Peter Marc Jacobson	TV series	United States	In the original American version, Fran and her mother are frequently depicted with characteristics of the Jewish American Princess and Jewish mother stereotypes, in the Italian dubbed version, Fran is depicted as Italian American and her mother as a stereotypical "Italian mother" which modifies much of the basis of the core humor of the show.
1994	Monica Geller, Ross Geller	Friends	David Crane; Marta Kauffman	TV series	United States	Within the story, Monica and Ross Geller's father is Jewish. However, other than rare references to Hanukkah, the show does not overtly explore or on their Jewish heritage, so Vincent Brook labels them as "perceptually Jewish". While not intended by their creator as being Jewish, Monica and Ross' mother and Chandler's girlfriend Janice have been perceived as a stereotypical smothering Jewish mother and spoiled Jewish American Princess.
1994	Nazira Mualdeb and her family	The Perfumes of Carthage (Perfumes de Cartago)	Teresa Porzecanski	Novella	Uruguay	The novella follows the lives of the women of the Mualdeb family from the time they emigrate from Syria to Uruguay in the early 20th century. As the family slowly assimilates, they maintain symbols and traditions of their sephardic heritage, such as the use of a matchmaker to arrange marriages.
1994	Arnold Perlstein	The Magic School Bus	Joanna Cole Bruce Degen	Children's books, animated TV series	United States	The phobic child in the series, Arnold's Jewish background is mentioned in the episode "Family Holiday Special" where he cannot see The Nutcracker due to having to leave to see his sick grandmother for Hanukkah.
1995	Moraes Zogoiby	The Moor's Last Sigh	Salman Rushdie	Novel	England	Moraes Zagoiby is of Catholic, Jewish and Muslim heritage living in India. Within the novel, Zogoiby's Jewish community at Cochin disperses. Sander Gilman describes the novel as one in the "model of storytelling in which the Jews exist in the past but vanish as the storyteller moves toward the present."
1995	Zacarias Levy	Alba y el recaudador de aguas and other stories	Daniel Múgica	Young adult novels	Spain	In Múgica's young adult novels, Zacarias and two companions solve mysteries. The books' presentation of the Jewish Levy family "as naturally as any other characters" was described as a "novelty" in Spanish literature of the time. In the second book, the plotline involves the Levy family being attacked by Aryans.
1996	Jake and Rachel Berenson	Animorphs	Katherine Applegate, Michael Grant (as K.A. Applegate)	Young adult novels	United States	Jake and Rachel are paternal first cousins, and at one point Rachel mentions that her father is Jewish, logically making her and Jake Jewish as well. In an alternate universe, Jake mentions being Jewish in his narration.
1997	Bobe (Grandmother)	La bobe	Sabina Berman	Novel	Mexico	The novel illustrates the relationships between the young narrator, her mother, and her bobe. Bobe is very strong in her Jewish faith, while the mother has rejected Judaism, and the narrator attempts to join the two worlds together.
1997	Kyle Broflovski, his family, and cousin Kyle Schwartz	South Park	Trey Parker, Matt Stone	TV series	United States	Cartman's vitriolic antisemitic comments and Kyle's responses are one of the show's hallmarks. Kyle's mother, Sheila, protests the schools celebration of Christmas because "Our family doesn't celebrate Christmas" which stops the holiday in South Park. Kyle's cousin from Connecticut, also named Kyle, appears in the 5th season's episode The Entity as a neurotic stereotypical Jew in the mold of Woody Allen, but is also used to critique "whiteness".
1997	Ruth Puttermesser	The Puttermesser Papers	Cynthia Ozick	Novel	United States	Puttermesser is a recurring character in the works of Ozick and the subject of all of the stories collected in The Puttermesser Papers . She is a Jewish-American lawyer, living in New York. In one of the stories, Ozick "Americanizes" Jewish folklore when Puttermesser confronts the evil mayor of New York, Malachy Mavett, by creating a female golem out of the dirt of her flowerpots, and with the help of the golem, turns New York into a paradise and becomes mayor.
1997	Unnamed narrator	The Walled City	Esther David	Novel	India	The narrator, an unnamed Jewish girl from the long established Bene Israel community in India, recounts her life growing up in Delhi. The story recounts her attraction to the "noisy" Hindu religious ceremonies and how she falls in love with a boy from the higher class Baghdadi Jewish community. The book has been called "India's first Jewish novel.
1997	Willow Rosenberg	Buffy the Vampire Slayer	Joss Whedon	TV show	United States	Willow Rosenberg stood out as a positive portrayal of a Jewish woman and at the height of her popularity, she fell in love with another woman, a witch named Tara Maclay. They became one of the first lesbian couples on U.S. television and one of the most positive relationships of the series.
1998	Grace Adler, Marvin "Leo" Markus	Will and Grace	David Kohan, Max Mutchnick	TV series	United States	When the character Grace Adler married Leo Markus, it was the first time a wedding between two Jews was shown as part of an American television series.
1999	Mort Goldman	Family Guy	John G. Brennan	TV series	United States	The series has repeatedly been criticized for perceived antisemitic humor such as main character Peter Griffin "hanging a 'Scare Jew' dressed like Hitler in his front yard to keep a Jewish neighbor away" and shooting at Mort Goldman, the same neighbor, in parody of a scene from Schindler's List. Goldman has been described by the Parents Television Council as "a stereotyped Jewish man."
1999	Joshua Lyman, Toby Ziegler	The West Wing	Aaron Sorkin	TV series	United States	Joshua Lyman's grandfather was held in the Nazi Concentration camp Birkenau during World War II. He is non-practicing, although his faith is sometimes brought up by other characters on the show from time to time. Toby Ziegler is a practicing Jew, whose father worked for the Jewish-Italian arm of La Casa Nostra known as Murder, Incorporated. In "Take this Sabbath Day" (1:14), Toby's rabbi gives a sermon on the amorality of capital punishment to influence Toby to take action on an inmate expected to be executed in a few days, and privately urges him to do the same.
2000	Joseph Kavalier, Sam Clay (Klayman), Rosa Saks, various characters	The Amazing Adventures of Kavalier & Clay	Michael Chabon	Novel	United States	Joe is an artist and escapist from Prague who narrowly escapes the Nazi takeover of Czechoslovakia, and comes to live with his cousin Sam Klayman in New York City. There, they create some of the first comic books.
2000	Various characters	Curb Your Enthusiasm	Larry David	TV series	United States	Characters: Larry David, Jeff Greene, Susie Greene, Marty Funkhouser, Nat David, Jerry Seinfeld, Andy Ackerman, Jason Alexander and other common Jewish guest characters. Curb Your Enthusiasm stars Larry David after "Seinfeld" has ended. The show depicts himself going about his everyday life in Santa Monica, California. The show offers the life and times of Larry and the predicaments he gets himself in with his friends and complete strangers. If there isn't a show that screams Judaism, it's got to be this one. From the out-spoken stereotypical personality Brooklyn Jew, Larry throughout the show comes into conflicts whether it be with money, a Passover Seder, or Bat Mitzvah speech the show simply has got it all.
2000	Valerie Pitman	Doctors	Sarah Moyle	Television	England	Valerie takes a DNA test and discovers that she is 16% Jewish. She decides to explore her Jewish heritage and begins a relationship with Rabbi David Klarfeld (Simon Schatzberger).
2000	Gaylord "Greg" Focker	Meet the Parents	Jay Roach	Film	United States	Gaylord is a Jewish-American nurse who visits his girlfriend's parents which leads to a series of unfortunate events.
2002	Alex-Li Tandem	The Autograph Man	Zadie Smith	Novel	England	Alix-Li is a Chinese Jewish Londoner who grew up on pop culture and is writing a book in which he classifies things a "Jewish" or "goyish".
2002	Ron Stoppable	Kim Possible	Bob Schooley, Mark McCorkle	TV show	America	Ron Stoppable is titular character Kim Possible's sidekick and best friend. He has a naked mole-rat named Rufus.
2003	Charlotte York Goldenblatt	Sex and the City	Darren Star	TV series	United States	Charlotte (Kristin Davis) converts to Judaism in the beginning of season six so that she can marry Harry Goldenblatt, the man who had been her divorce attorney and whom she fell in love with.
2003	Ruth Weinstein, Hannah Weinstein	Rosenstrasse	Margarethe von Trotta (director) von Trotta and Pamela Katz (screenplay)	Film	Germany	After her husband's death, Ruth Weinstein, who is living in New York at the turn of the 21st century, becomes traumatized by memories from her youth and "inexplicably" begins following Orthodox Jewish customs. This triggers her adult daughter, Hannah, to travel back to Germany where she discovers that her grandmother (Ruth's mother) had been arrested by the Nazis and held in a prison on Rossenstrasse. As a little girl on the street outside the prison, Ruth had been found and eventually cared for by a Gentile woman who was successfully protesting there for the release of her Jewish husband.
2003	Mordechai Jefferson Carver	The Hebrew Hammer	Jonathan Kesselman	Film	United States	In this Jewish take on Blaxploitation films, Adam Goldberg plays the Jewish Mordechai Jefferson Carver, also known as The Hebrew Hammer, who protects the Jewish community from the evil son of Santa Claus who wants to destroy Hanukkah so that everyone will celebrate Christmas. The film "derives its humor from the awkward juxtaposition of Jewish and African American stereotypes."
2003	Seth Cohen	The OC	Josh Schwartz	TV series	United States	
2003	Anthony Goldstein	Harry Potter	J.K. Rowling	Novel	England	Ravenclaw student in Harry's year of school and member of Dumbledore's army.
2003	Rabbi Aharon Handalman and Rabbi Yosef Kobinsky	Dante's Equation	Jane Jensen	Novel	United States	Kobinsky and Handalman use Torah code and interpretation of the Sefirot to understand the quasi-spiritual and physical nature of the universe and of reincarnation.
2004	Jakob Zuckermann, aka Jaecki Zucker, Samuel Zuckerman	Alles auf Zucker!	Dani Levy	Film	Germany	Jaecki, his wife and his children, who actually have no knowledge of Jewish traditions, pretend to be ultra-orthodox when Jaecki's brother Samuel comes back to town and they must mourn the death of their mother according to Jewish ritual in order to receive their inheritance.
2004	Samantha "Sam" Manson	Danny Phantom	Butch Hartman	Animated TV series	United States	The main heroine of the series, Sam Manson is a conservative vegetarian and animal rights activist who refuses to eat anything with a face. Her grandmother refers to her as "Bubaleh" and her wealthy family is seen practicing their Jewish faith in the episode "The Fright Before Christmas".
2004	Bernie Focker, Roz Focker	Meet the Fockers	Jay Roach	Film	United States	The parents of Gaylord Focker who are introduced to the parents of his fiancée.
2005	Jane Smith	Mr. & Mrs. Smith	Simon Kinberg, author Doug Liman, director	Film	United States	In a throwaway gag at the end of the film when Jane (Angelina Jolie) and her husband are confessing secrets to each other, Jane, who is secretly an assassin, reveals that she is Jewish. The presentation of a tough, physically active woman as Jewish provides a counter-view to the stereotypical "Jewish American Princess" or "Jewish mother" images often presented in the media.
2005	Andy Botwin, Judah Botwin (deceased), Yael Hoffman, Rabbi David Bloom, Lennie Botwin, Shane Botwin, Silas Botwin, Stevie Botwin-Reyes-Bloom	"Weeds"	Jenji Kohan (creator)	TV series	United States	The Botwins are "dealing" in suburbia.
2005	Ziva David	NCIS	Donald P. Bellisario (Creator)	TV series	United States	The character Ziva David is an Israeli Jew who first appears in season 3 and last appears in season 17.
2006	Simon Goldberg	Dresden	Roland Suso Richter (director); Stefan Kolditz (screenplay)	TV miniseries	Germany	In this film that is one of the initial exemplars of the "German suffering genre", the Jewish character, Simon, is portrayed as "emasculated" in comparison to both the virile British pilot portrayed in the film and the historically lecherous portrayal of Jewish males by the Nazi regime in the time period in which the film is set.
2006	Rabbi Russell Stone	The Shivah	Dave Gilbert (game designer)	Adventure game	United States	In The Shivah players play as a Rabbi named Russell Stone.
2007	Rachel Menken	Mad Men	Matthew Weiner	TV series	United States	Rachel is a department store executive and love interest for Don Draper on season one of Mad Men who is " a tribute to the attractiveness of independent-minded Jewish women, the Draper-Menken affair is a commentary on the place of Jews in the American myth".
2007	April Epner	Then She Found Me	Helen Hunt (director); Hunt, Alice Arlen, Victor Levin (screenplay)	Film	United States	April is presented as a devout Jew, a character type that Joanna Smith Rakoff says is a rare thing in cinema.
2007	Isabella Garcia-Shapiro; Vivian Garcia-Shapiro	Phineas and Ferb	Dan Povenmire, Jeff "Swampy" Marsh	TV series	United States	Isabella Garcia-Shapiro is a Jewish Mexican American girl. She is one of the brothers' best friends and has an obvious crush on Phineas Flynn of which he is unaware, though he has shown he cares for her from time to time. She is known for the catchphrase, "Whatcha doin'?" (which she doesn't like when other people besides Phineas say) and is the leader of the Fireside Girls troop 46231. The troop often helps Phineas and Ferb Fletcher in their projects. Vivian Garcia-Shapiro, or simply "Viv", is Isabella's mother and one of Linda's best friends, and plays upright bass in a jazz band with Linda Flynn and Jeremy's mom.
2009	Noah "Puck" Puckerman, Rachel Berry	Glee	Ryan Murphy, Brad Falchuk, Ian Brennan	TV series	United States	In the episode "Mash-Up" Puck attempts to be a "good Jew," and sings songs by real-life Jewish performers such as Neil Diamond.
2009	Annie Edison	Community	Dan Harmon	TV series	United States	Annie's Judaism is revealed when Shirley tries to get her to participate in her Christmas party, and is brought up a few times throughout the show when the topic of religion surfaces as a hot-button issue for the study group.
2009	Danny Sexbang	Ninja Sex Party	Dan Avidan, Brian Wecht	Comedy Band	United States	Danny Sexbang is a Jewish superhero who wears a unitard, with his best friend who's a ninja, and together they sing songs about dicks, and try to hit [unsuccessfully] on women. Danny very proudly displays his Jewish heritage and frequently uses it as a feature in his comedy as well as wooing of Women. Danny Sexbang is portrayed by Dan Avidan, who is also Jewish.
2010	Velma Dinkley	Scooby-Doo! Mystery Incorporated	Mitch Watson, Spike Brandt and Tony Cervone	Animated TV series	United States	Velma Dinkley is one of the show's protagonists, a teenage detective who is implied to be Jewish: she listens to Klezmer music, and frequently exclaims "Oy!" and "Oy gevalt!"
2011	Winston Schmidt	New Girl	Elizabeth Meriwether	TV series	United States	Schmidt's Jewish identity is mentioned throughout the show. On episode 5 of season 3, Schmidt seeks out the advice of his rabbi. When Schmidt and Cece get married at the end of season 5, the wedding ceremony is a mixed Jewish-Indian one. Like his character, actor Max Greenfield is Jewish.
2012	Felicity Smoak	Arrow	Greg Berlanti, Marc Guggenheim, Andrew Kreisberg	TV series	United States	Felicity Smoak is half-Jewish from her mother, whose surname she took.
2013	Jake Peralta	Brooklyn Nine-Nine	Dan Goor, Michael Schur	TV series	United States	Jake is half-Jewish, through his mother Karen Peralta. He is non-practicing and is generally unenthused by religious or communal tradition, such as Thanksgiving or Passover. However, he seems to respect and enjoy his mother's Judaism, serving a Passover Brisket (along with other things) to his coworkers when he's released from prison "cause you know I loves my mom". He had a Bar Mitzvah when he was 13, where he started to obsess over his crush, Jenny Gildenhorn. It is implied that he grew up around other Jewish children, attending Bar and Bat mitzvahs throughout his childhood.
2014	Maura Pfefferman, Shelly Pfefferman, Sarah Pfefferman, Ali Pfefferman, Josh Pfefferman, Raquel Fein	Transparent	Joey Soloway	TV series	United States	The series depicts several Jewish characters and deals with spiritually and culturally Jewish themes. Joey Soloway, the series' primary creator, is Jewish and uses Rabbi Susan Goldberg of Wilshire Boulevard Temple as a consultant for the show. They also seek advice from Rabbi Amichai Lau-Lavie of New York, describing him as "a God-optional patriarchy-toppling Jewish modern mind. There's a mandate among religious and spiritual thinkers to be thinking about the binary, the gendered, the feminist, the goddess, and Amichai reminds me of that every day." The focus is mainly on the Jewish experience as viewed through the dual prisms of Reform Judaism and Jewish cultural identity.
2016	Neil	Camp Camp	Miles Luna, Jordan Cwierz	Web series	United States	One of the main characters of the series, Neil is confirmed to be Jewish in the episode "Reigny Day" when a bully mentions he doesn't bully Neil on the Sabbath. Later, he boasts about his religion in "Culture Day" to try to look cool in the eyes of the other campers, but ultimately comes clean when the campers mob him demanding answers.
2017	Missy Foreman-Greenwald	Big Mouth	Nick Kroll, Andrew Goldberg, Jennifer Flackett, Mark Levin	TV show	America	
2018	Kate Kane / Batwoman, Beth Kane / Alice	Batwoman	Caroline Dries	TV series	United States	The main title hero, Kate Kane is a Batman cousin, lesbian superhero, played by Ruby Rose. Her twin sister Beth, the super-villain, played by Rachel Skarsten. A scene of their Bat Mitvah was filmed and deleted, but they hold a picture of both from that Bat Mitvah.
2018	Joseph Gabriel "Joe" Goldberg	You	Caroline Kepnes	TV series	United States	Joe has Jewish ancestry. Joe Goldberg is a serial killer who becomes obsessed with women and does everything he can to insert himself into their lives.
2021	Abigail Stone	Spirit Untamed		Animated Film	United States	Abigail Stone is of Jewish and German ancestry, and a friend of Lucky Prescott and Pru Granger. Her Jewish heritage isn't revealed in the movie, but Kerim Kurun of White House Studios alleges that Abigail is jewish.
2021	Libby Stein-Torres	The Ghost and Molly McGee	Bill Motz, Bob Roth	TV series	United States	Libby is of Jewish and Hispanic ancestry, and a friend of title character Molly McGee. Libby's Jewish heritage is revealed in the episode "Mazel Tov, Libby!", where her Bat Mitzvah is celebrated.
2022	Sammy Fabelman	The Fabelmans	Steven Spielberg, Tony Kushner	Film	United States	Loosely based on Spielberg, the film's director, Sammy and his family are Jewish and this is introduced early in the film during the Hanukkah montage. He was played by Canadian actor Gabriel LaBelle, who was raised Jewish.
2023	Casey Goldberg-Calderon	Moon Girl and Devil Dinosaur	Steve Loter, Jeffrey M. Howard, Kate Kondell	TV series	United States	In the episode, "Today, I Am a Woman", Casey has Shabbat dinner and a Bat Mitvah.
