= Oscar Brand =

Canadian-American musician and radio and TV host (1920-2016)

- Brand as pictured on the cover of his 1962 live album Morality
- Born: February 7, 1920; Winnipeg, Manitoba, Canada
- Died: September 30, 2016 (aged 96); Great Neck, New York, U.S.
- Education: Brooklyn College (BS)
- Employer: WNYC
- Website: oscarbrand.com

Oscar Brand (February 7, 1920 – September 30, 2016) was a Canadian-born American folk singer-songwriter, radio and TV host, and author. In his career, spanning 70 years, he composed at least 300 songs and released nearly 100 albums, among them Canadian and American patriotic songs. Brand's music ran the gamut from novelty songs to serious social commentary and spanned a number of genres. Brand also wrote a number of short stories.

For 70 years, he was the host of a weekly folk music show on WNYC Radio in New York City, which is credited as the longest-running radio show with only one host in broadcasting history. In Canada, he was host of the televised folk concert series, Let's Sing Out!, which ran from 1963 to 1967, first on the CTV network, then on CBC, featuring Canadian and U.S. folk stars of the day. He also hosted shorter-lived CTV series while Let's Sing Out! was on CBC.

== Life and career ==
Brand was born to a Jewish family in Winnipeg, Manitoba, Canada. His father, Isidore Brand, was an interpreter for the Hudson's Bay Company. His mother was named Beatrice. In 1927, the family moved to Minneapolis, then to Chicago and ultimately to New York City. As a young man, Oscar lived in Borough Park, Brooklyn, and graduated from Erasmus Hall High School and later from Brooklyn College with a BS in psychology.

In his long career he played alongside such legends of folk music as Lead Belly, Woody Guthrie, Josh White, Jean Ritchie, the Weavers and Pete Seeger. His Canadian television series included concert broadcasts with several singers and groups a week, among them Canadians Joni Mitchell (then Joni Anderson) and Bonnie Dobson, and U.S. performers Jim Kweskin Jug Band, Dave Van Ronk, Len Chandler, Simon & Garfunkel, Phil Ochs and others, as well as Brand himself. He wrote various books on the folk song and folk song collections, including The Ballad Mongers: Rise of the American Folk Song, Songs Of '76: A Folksinger's History Of The Revolution and Bawdy Songs & Backroom Ballads, the latter comprising four volumes.

Brand was known for composing catchy and themed folk songs, including the eponymous theme to his initially CTV and then CBC television show Let's Sing Out and the Canadian patriotic song "Something to Sing About" (actual title: "This Land of Ours"), which is one of Canada's national songs. He was also a frequent performer at the Mariposa Folk Festival during this period, including performances in 1962, 1968, 1969, and 1987, as well as the 50th anniversary in 2010. He collaborated on a number of musicals, most notably The Education of H*Y*M*A*N K*A*P*L*A*N (a musical version of Leo Rosten's stories about the fictional Jewish character Hyman Kaplan), How to Steal an Election, and A Joyful Noise.

In 1976, Brand recorded the campaign song for former Democratic Georgia governor Jimmy Carter's successful presidential campaign titled "Why Not the Best?".

He hosted the radio show Oscar Brand's Folksong Festival on Saturdays at 10:00 p.m. on WNYC-AM 820 in New York City, which ran into its 70th year. The show ran more or less continuously from its debut on December 10, 1945 to September 2016, making it the longest-running radio show with the same host, according to the Guinness Book of World Records. Over its run it introduced such talents to the world as Bob Dylan, Joan Baez, Woody Guthrie, Arlo Guthrie, Huddie Ledbetter, Joni Mitchell, Peter, Paul & Mary, Judy Collins, The Kingston Trio, Pete Seeger and the Weavers. In order to make sure that his radio program could not be censored he refused to be paid by WNYC for the next 70 years.

He wrote the lyrics to the song "A Guy is a Guy" (1952), which became a hit for Doris Day. He also wrote the English lyrics to the song "Shlub-a-Dubba-Dub" (1961) which became a minor hit for Mitch Miller.

He contributed stories and songs for the "Young People's Records" label, including "Noah's Ark".

He was a friend of the folksinger Jean Ritchie for many years. They recorded several duets together, including the British song "Keys to Canterbury".

Although Brand was anti-Stalinist and was never a member of any Communist party, the House Committee on Un-American Activities referred to his show as a "pipeline of communism", because of his belief in the rights under the First Amendment of blacklisted artists to have a platform to reach the public. Accordingly, in June 1950, Brand was named in the premier issue of Red Channels as a Communist sympathizer, along with Paul Robeson, Josh White and Pete Seeger.

While Brand was not as well-known or radical an activist as some of his contemporaries, he was a long-standing supporter of civil rights. However, after Brand was contacted by HUAC, he "broke with the left-wing folk music world. He then met privately with a representative from HUAC"

He told stories of buying food for Lead Belly when the two traveled together in segregated areas, and participated in the 1965 Selma to Montgomery marches.

Brand was one of the original organizers of the Newport Folk Festival, which began in 1959.

In the early 1960s, Brand brought his substantial connections in the worldwide folk music community home to his native Canada with his CTV and then CBC television program Let's Sing Out. The program was staged at and broadcast from university campuses across Canada and both revived the careers of long-forgotten pioneers of the folk music movement such as Malvina Reynolds, the Womenfolk, The Weavers and others and introduced then-unknown Canadian singers such as Joni Mitchell and Gordon Lightfoot. His score for the 1968 Off-Broadway show, How to Steal An Election sent up the current belief that charisma would help a candidate win. Songs included "Charisma" (sung by Calvin Coolidge) and "Down Among the Grassroots". The album cover was decorated with election buttons, including the 1968 Nixon campaign.

Brand also served during the 1960s as a board member of the Children's Television Workshop and participated in the development of Sesame Street. Because of some mild disagreements that had occurred between Brand and the board members regarding the appropriate setting for the show, it has been reputed that as a playful joke, the character of Oscar the Grouch was named after him, although there are dueling tales as to the origin of the character.

Brand composed the original theme and provided musical direction for the 1976 Smithsonian Institution half-hour documentary, Celebrating a Century: The 1876 Philadelphia Centennial Exhibition.

In May 1976, Brand appeared in Madison Square Garden's Felt Forum at the memorial celebration for Phil Ochs, performing Ochs' "Love Me I'm A Liberal" with updated lyrics.

Brand was given the Peabody Award for broadcast excellence in 1982 for his broadcast The Sunday Show on National Public Radio, and was awarded the Personal Peabody Award in 1995 (shared with Oprah Winfrey).

Brand was a founding board member and served as curator of the Songwriters Hall of Fame. In 1980, he created the first Songwriters Hall of Fame Museum at One Times Square in New York City.

Brand authored a number of short stories, including:

- "The Miser's Gold", about two young brothers who dare each other to spend the night in an allegedly haunted house - only to discover that "allegedly" is inapplicable. The boys encounter the ghost of a wealthy but lonely man; greatly amused by their reasons for being there, he names them as heirs to his considerable fortune.
- "The Hitchhiker", about a young man who, on his way home from a party, picks up a beautiful young woman who turns out to be much more than she seems.

Dramatic readings of these stories were issued as cut-out cardboard records on the back of Honeycomb cereal boxes.

On January 18, 2010, WoodSongs Old-Time Radio Hour celebrated Brand's upcoming 90th birthday and the 65th anniversary of his radio career before an audience from Lexington, Kentucky, where host Michael Johnathan and guest Josh White Jr. performed with Brand and talked with him about his life. On February 7, 2010, CBC Radio's Sunday Edition celebrated Brand's life on the occasion of his 90th birthday.

Brand died of pneumonia on September 30, 2016, at the age of 96.
