= Ludwig II (1922 film) =

1922 Austrian silent film

- Directed by: Otto Kreisler
- Written by: Alfred Deutsch-German
- Starring: Olaf Fjord; Thea Rosenquist; Eugen Preiß; Franz Scherer
- Production company: Helios Film
- Release date: 24 March 1922
- Country: Austria
- Languages: Silent; German intertitles

Ludwig II is a 1922 Austrian silent historical film directed by Otto Kreisler and starring Olaf Fjord, Thea Rosenquist and Eugen Preiß. It is a biopic, based on the life of the 19th-century Bavarian monarch Ludwig II.

== Cast ==
- Olaf Fjord as Ludwig II
- Thea Rosenquist as Baronesse Tirnau
- Eugen Preiß as Richard Wagner
- Franz Scherer as Kaiser Franz Josef I.
- Gina Puch-Klitsch as Empress Elisabeth of Austria, "Sisi"
- Josef Glücksmann as Bruder Otto
- Paul Askonas as Luitpold
- Josef Schreiber as Otto von Bismarck
- Ferdinand Onno

== Bibliography ==
- * Dassanowsky, Robert. Austrian Cinema: A History. McFarland & Company Incorporated Publishing, 2005.
