= Let's Sing Out =

- Genre: Music
- Presented by: Oscar Brand
- Country of origin: Canada
- Original language: English
- No. of seasons: 4

Production
- Producer: Syd Banks

Original release
- Network: CTV Television Network; CBC Television
- Release: 1963 – 7 July 1967

Let's Sing Out is a Canadian music television program that aired on CTV from 1963 to 1966 and then on CBC Television until 1968.

== Premise ==
This series, patterned after the American Hootenanny television show, featured contemporary folk musicians sharing a stage at college concerts hosted by folk musician Oscar Brand. Episodes were filmed on location at universities and geared towards post-secondary school audiences.

Guests included such artists as Eric Andersen, Len Chandler, Bonnie Dobson, Jim Kweskin Jug Band (when it included Geoff Muldaur and Maria Muldaur), Joni Mitchell (as Joni Anderson), Phil Ochs, Tom Rush, Simon & Garfunkel, Dave Van Ronk, Josh White Jr. and The Clancy Brothers.

== Scheduling ==
Let's Sing Out began in 1963 on CTV. The series was broadcast on the CBC network. This began on October 7, 1966. Airing Fridays at 5:30 p.m. (Eastern) until July 7, 1967. It was rebroadcast on CBC from July 5 to 20 September 1968, also in the Friday 5:30 p.m time slot. Let's Sing Out was sold to markets in Australia, New Zealand, and the United Kingdom.
