= Luis de Ulloa y Pereira =

- Born: 1584; Toro, Zamora, Kingdom of Spain
- Died: 1674; Toro, Zamora, Kingdom of Spain
- Occupations: Writer, civil servant, judge, playwright
- Movement: Culteranismo

Luis de Ulloa Pereira (c. 15 December 1584 – 1674) was a Spanish nobleman, politician and writer of the Baroque era.

== Biography ==
Luis de Ulloa y Pereira was born in the town of Toro in the region of Castille, Spain. His father had held the position of attorney and member of the town Council. Luis was able to study in Valladolid, where his uncle lived, but did not attend university.

He craved for a role in the Madrid court, but soon returned to his family home in Toro, with funds scarce and a habit of gambling. He widowed twice and married three times. Through the intervention of don Ramiro Núñez de Felípez de Guzmán, Duke of Medina de las Torres and son in law of the Conde Duque de Olivares, Luis did get an appointment as magistrate for León (1625–1631) and Logroño (1633–1637). In the latter town, he published his best-known work: La Raquel. This poem is based on a story that claims King Alfonso VIII had an ill-fated relationship with a Jewish paramour Rahel la Fermosa.

In 1643, the Conde Duque of Olivares, met with Luis on a visit to Toro; the poet is said to have been wounded in a duel defending the Count Duke. Luis was able to travel to Madrid and meet various luminaries and writers, including Luis de Góngora, As well as receive them in visits to Toro. His poetry shared in style with Góngora's culteranismo, but was often more clear and direct:

Original Spanish

¡Oh segura quietud, donde perfectos
percibe los acentos el oído,
y la vista distintos los objetos!
Dichoso aquél, que en su secreto olvido
pasa ignorado la distancia breve
del primer llanto al último gemido.

English translation

O assuring quietude, where perfect
are perceived the accents in the ear,
and by sight are distinguished objects!
Contented he, who in his secret oblivion
passes ignored the brief distance
between the first cry and the last whimper

He was also a writer of non-fiction reflections on daily life an Epístola a un caballero amigo, que vivía en Sevilla, where he praises the life at court in Madrid. In his Memorias familiares y literarias and Relaciones he recounts apparently veiled autobiographical observations. He also wrote plays such as La mujer contra el consejo, No muda el amor semblante, Porcia y Tancredo, and Pico y Canente.

== Works ==
- Alfonso Octavo Príncipe perfecto, diuertido por Hermosa, ó por Raquel Hebrera: en rimas castellanas, s. l., 1643;
- Fiestas que se celebraron en la Corte por el nacimiento de don Felipe Próspero Príncipe de Asturias, haze memoria dellas el Rey [...] poniéndolas en las manos del [...] señor marqués de Heliche don Luis de Ulloa Pereira [Madrid], 1658;
- Obras de don Luis de Vlloa Pereira: prosas y versos, añadidas en esta última impressión, recogidas y dadas a la estampa por D. Iuan Antonio de Vlloa Pereira su hijo, Madrid, Imprenta del Reyno, 1674.
- Memorias familiares y literarias del poeta D. Luis de Ulloa, introd. de M. Artigas, Madrid, Sociedad de Bibliófilos Españoles, 1925

== Bibliography ==
- Martínez Hernández, Santiago. "Luis Ulloa Pereira". Diccionario biográfico español (in Spanish). Real Academia de la Historia.
