= Rahel la Fermosa =

Lover to King Alfonso VIII of Castile

Rahel la Fermosa (Ladino for "Rachel the Beautiful"; originally Rahel Esra; c. 1165, Toledo – 1195, Toledo) was a Jewish woman who lived in Toledo, Spain in the twelfth century. She was the paramour of King Alfonso VIII of Castile, a Catholic Christian and husband of Eleanor of England, for almost seven years. Under her influence, a number of Spanish Jews were appointed to positions within the royal court. This led to discontent among the clergy and nobility. Rahel received the death penalty, together with her fellow Jews in the court, in the presence of the king himself.

== Historical debate ==
This love-story, which had been relegated to the realm of fable by the Marquis de Mondejar and other Spanish literary historians, is related as a fact by Sancho IV around 1292. Given that the story is not mentioned in historical documents until then, modern scholars continue to debate the historical nature of Rahel and her relationship with the king.

== In popular culture ==
The love affair between Rahel and Alfonso has been dramatized by Luis de Ulloa y Pereira, Vicente Antonio García de la Huerta, and other Spanish writers, as well as by Franz Grillparzer in his play, Die Jüdin von Toledo. Die Jüdin von Toledo was also the name of a novel by Lion Feuchtwanger, based on the story of Rahel and Alfonso as is La Historia de Fermosa by Abraham S. Marrache.

She was portrayed in the 1919 film The Jewess of Toledo by Thea Rosenquist.

== Sources ==
- Marrache, Abraham S. (2009). La Historia de Fermosa. Madrid: Hebraica Ediciones.
- Gottheil, Richard and Meyer Kayserling. "Fermosa". Jewish Encyclopedia. Funk and Wagnalls, 1901–1906, citing:

- Rosseeuw Saint-Hilaire, Histoire d'Espagne, 1837, etc.; v. 181, 527 et seq.;
- Amador de los Rios, Hist. i. 335 et seq.;
- Kayserling. Die Jüdischen Frauen, p. 74.

- Shadis, Miriam (2010). Berenguela of Castile (1180–1246) and Political Women in the High Middle Ages. Palgrave Macmillan. ISBN 978-0-312-23473-7.
