= Theodor Herzl (film) =

1921 film

- Directed by: Otto Kreisler
- Written by: Heinrich Glücksmann
- Starring: Ernst Bath; Rudolph Schildkraut; Joseph Schildkraut; Josef Schreiter
- Music by: Josef Sulzer
- Production company: Helios Film
- Distributed by: Helios Film
- Release date: 1921
- Country: Austria
- Languages: Silent; German intertitles

Theodor Herzl or Theodor Herzl, Standard-Bearer of the Jewish People (German: Theodor Herzl, der Bannerträger des jüdischen Volkes) is a 1921 Austrian silent drama film directed by Otto Kreisler and starring Ernst Bath, Rudolph Schildkraut and Joseph Schildkraut. It portrays the life of Theodor Herzl, the pioneer of modern Zionism.

== Cast ==
- Ernst Bath as Theodor Herzl
- Rudolph Schildkraut as Das ringende Israel
- Joseph Schildkraut as Das leidende Israel
- Josef Schreiter as Prophet
- Rudolf Dietz as Dr. Samuel Goldblatt
- Else Osterheim as eine junge russische Jüdin
- Gita Lenart-Vago as eine spanische Jüdin
- Axel Plessen as russischer Gutsbesitzer
- Pippa Gettke as Altjüdische tänzerin
- Heinz Altringen as König von Spanien
- Ludwig Donath as Prinz Eugen
- Eugen Preiß as Pope Leo XIII
- James Battle as Sultan Abdulhamid II

== Bibliography ==
- Baer, Nicholas The Rebirth of a Nation:Cinema, Herzlian Zionism, and Emotion in Jewish History. Leo Baeck Institute Year Book, Vol 59, 2014, pp. 233–248 at Academia.edu
- Dassanowsky, Robert. Austrian Cinema: A History. McFarland & Company Incorporated Publishing, 2005
- George, Alys X. Hollywood on the Danube?: Vienna and Austrian Silent Film of the 1920s, p. 154 in Holmes, Deborah & Silverman, Lisa. Interwar Vienna: Culture Between Tradition and Modernity. Camden House, 2009 at the Internet Archive
