= Heinrich Glücksmann =

Heinrich Glücksmann (7 July 1864 – June 1947) was a Moravian-born Austrian author.

He began his literary career at 16, one of his first productions being "Aufsätze über Frauensitten und Unsitten", which appeared in the "Wiener Hausfrauen-Zeitung" under the pseudonym "Henriette Namskilg" (Other pseudonym is "Fortunatus"). He then became a teacher in the Vienna School of Acting. From 1882 to 1885, he was editor of the "Fünfkirchner Zeitung" (of Pécs), and from 1884 to 1886 held similar positions with the "Neue Pester Journal" and the "Polit'sche Volksblatt" of Budapest.

In 1886, Glücksmann published an illustrated biographical edition of the works of Michael von Zichy, the painter; and in the same year, he published a biography of Munkàcsy. Since that time, he had been active as a feuilletonist and dramatist.

His bequest is stored in the Theatermuseum in Vienna.

== Literary works ==
His works are:

- Weihnachts-Zauber, drama, 1888 (Christmas Magic)
- Die Ball-Königin, comedy, translated from the Hungarian, 1889 (The Queen of the Ball)
- Wien, literary almanac, 1891 (Vienna)
- Neues Evangelium, drama, 1892 (New Gospel)
- Das goldene Zeitalter des Gewerbes, 1893
- Ungarns Millennium, 1896 (Hungary's Millennium)
- Liebesbrief, translation, 1897 (Love Letter)
- Kreislauf der Liebe, translation, 1897 (Cycle of Love)
- Dr. Idyll, translation, 1897
- Die Bürde der Schönheit, romance, 1897
- Franz Joseph I. und seine Zeit, 1898–1899 (Franz Joseph and His Time)
- Goethe als Theaterleiter, ca. 1906
- Fährten und Narben. Gesammelte Gedichte. 1879 – 1912, München, Georg Müller, 1913
- Victor Kutschera. Dem Doppeljubilar zum 60. Geburtstag u. zu 40jährigem Kunstwirken ... von seinen Kollegen, 1923 ()

== Film scripts ==
- Mozarts Leben, Lieben und Leiden, 1921
- Theodor Herzl (1921)
  - aka The Wandering Jew: The Life of Theodore Herzl (USA: informal English title)

== See also ==
- List of Austrian writers
