= The Jewess of Toledo =

1851 tragedy by Franz Grillparzer

The Jewess of Toledo (German: Die Jüdin von Toledo) is a play by Franz Grillparzer. Written in 1851, it was first performed in Prague in 1872, after Grillparzer's death.

The play is based on the love affair between King Alfonso VIII of Castile and Rahel la Fermosa, a Jewish woman.

In 1919 the play was turned into a German silent film The Jewess of Toledo directed by Otto Kreisler

La Historia de Fermosa by Abraham S. Marrache covers the same story, but in the form of a historical novel.
