= Daniel Múgica =

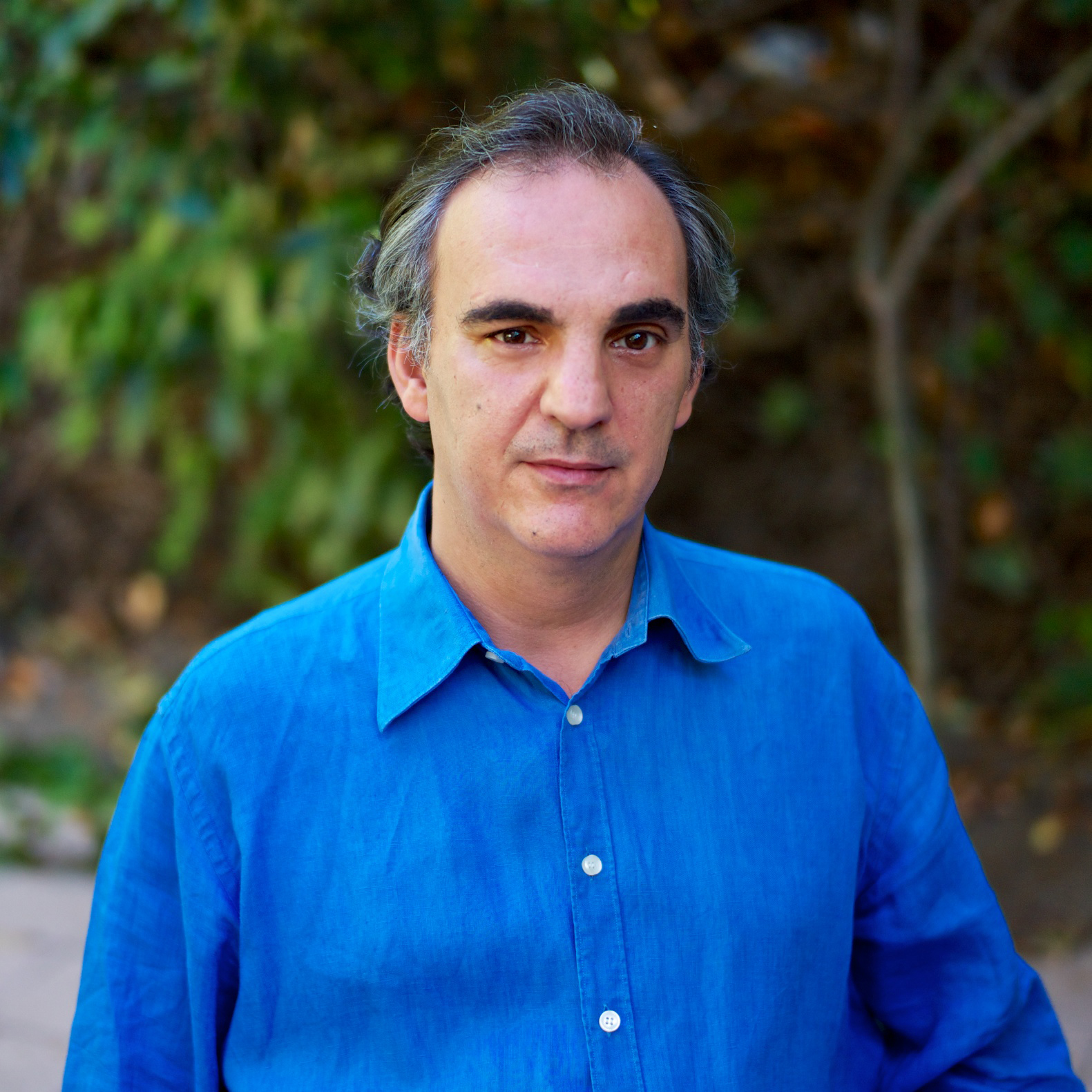
Daniel Múgica.

Daniel Múgica (born 4 April 1967, San Sebastián) is a writer and film director, son of the Spanish Jewish politician Enrique Múgica Herzog and the novelist Faustina Díaz Azcona.

== Published works ==
- En los hilos del títere. Realism. Novel. Publisher Plaza & Janes. 1988.
- Uno se vuelve loco. Dirty realism. Novel. Publisher Planeta. Planeta Group. 1899.
- Mar Calamidad. Stories. Publisher Mondadori. 1990.
- La mujer que faltaba. Dirty realism. Novel. Publisher Plaza & Janes. 1993.
- La Bici Cleta. Children´s story. Publisher Anaya. 1994.
- Alba y los cazadores de arañas. Young fiction. Novel. Publisher Anaya. 1995.
- Alba y la maldición gamada. Young fiction. Novel. Publisher Anaya. 1995.
- Alba y el recaudador de aguas. Young fiction. Novel. Publisher Anaya in 1995.
- Alba y el laberinto de las sombras. Young fiction. Novel. Publisher Anaya. 1995.
- La ciudad de abajo. Dirty realism. Novel. Publisher Plaza & Janes. 1996.
- El poder de la sombra. Young fiction. Novel. Publisher Alfaguay. Alfaguara Group. 1998.
- Corazón negro. Epistolary novel. Publisher Plaza & Janes. 1998.
- Mala Saña. Dystopian novel. Publisher Plaza & Janes. 2000.
- África en invierno. Dirty realism. Novel. Publisher Notodo. 2000.
- Bienvenido a la tormenta. Urban fantasy. Publisher Minotauro. Planeta Group. 2014.
- La dulzura. Intimate novel. Publisher Alzmuzara. Almuzara Group. 2107.
- Mr. Smile. La aventura. Young fiction. Publisher Toromítico. Almuzara group. 2019.

== Theater ==
- Author of La habitación escondida [The Hidden Room]. Autumn Festival. 1993.

== Television ==
Screenwriter. La virtud del asesino. TVE Series. 1997.

== Filmography ==
Direction and Screenplay:

- Pepo. Medium length film. 35 mm. 1991.
- Vientos de mal. A story of Basque terrorism. Medium length film. 35 mm. 1999. YouTube.
- Año cero. TV Movie. TVE. 35 mm.
- Ausiàs March. Series of two chapters. Valencian TV. 35 mm. 2001.
- Matar al Ángel. Movie. 35 mm. 2003.

== Awards ==
- Novel: Ateneo de Sevilla prize for Uno se vuelve loco
- Film: Vientos de mal (A story of Basque terrorism). YouTube. Menorca International Festival 1999. First jury prize.
- Novel: Premio Jaén of novel prize for "La dulzura". 2017.
