= Thea Rosenquist =

German actress

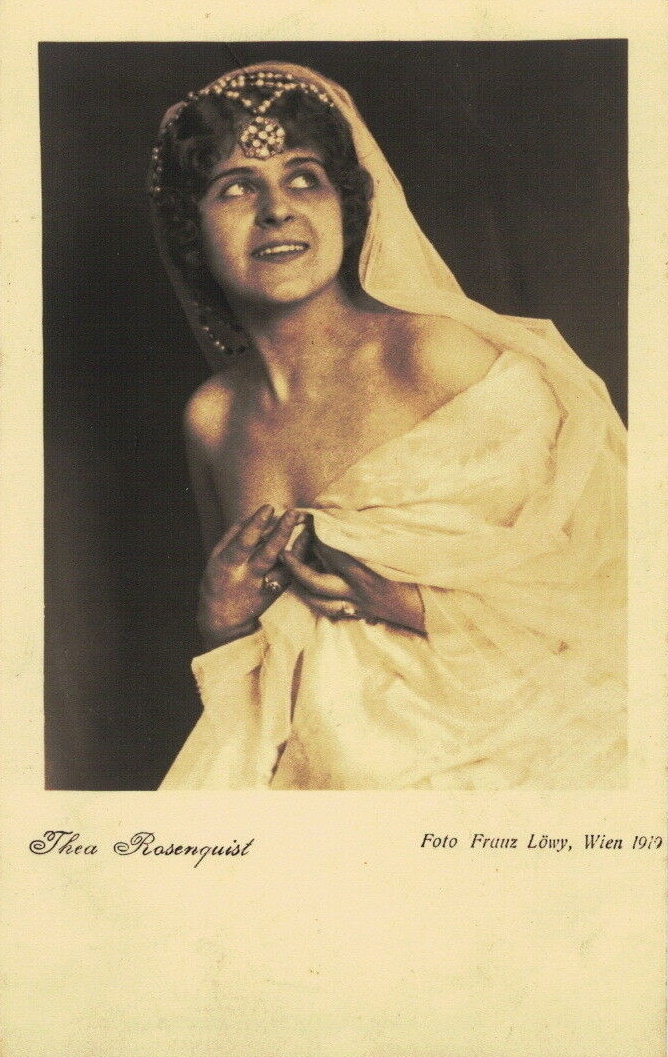
- Rosenquist in 1919
- Born: Theodora Anna Mathilde Julie Rosenquist; 8 May 1896; Lübeck, Schleswig-Holstein; German Empire
- Died: 26 July 1959 (aged 63); Vancouver, British Columbia; Canada
- Other names: Thea Körner; Thea Koerner
- Occupation: Actress
- Years active: 1913-1922

Theodora Anna Mathilde Julie Rosenquist (8 May 1896 – 26 July 1959), known as Thea Rosenquist, was a German stage and film actress. She acted in several Austrian silent films, and was considered a replacement for Liane Haid. She married industrialist Leon Joseph Koerner (or Körner) in 1923, and settled down in Vienna and Prague.

Rosenquist was of Jewish origin and had to escape following the Nazi takeovers of Austria and Czechoslovakia. She went to the Netherlands, on to Britain before finally settling down in Canada. Several of her family members were killed in the Holocaust.

Rosenquist and her husband established a charitable foundation, the Leon and Thea Koerner Foundation, in 1955. The Thea Koerner House Graduate Student Centre of the University of British Columbia was named in her honour.

The Koerner House, Leon and Thea Koerner's residence in Palm Springs, California, was designed by master architect E. Stewart Williams in 1955.

== Notable films ==
Rosenquist played Rahel in 1919's The Jewess of Toledo and starred as Baronesse Tirnau in the 1922 biopic, Ludwig II.

== Bibliography ==
- Dassanowsky, Robert. Austrian Cinema: A History. McFarland & Company Incorporated Pub, 2005.
