= The Education of H*Y*M*A*N K*A*P*L*A*N =

1968 musical by Oscar Brand and Paul Nassau

- Music: Oscar Brand; Paul Nassau
- Lyrics: Oscar Brand; Paul Nassau
- Book: Benjamin Bernard Zavin
- Setting: New York City, 1919
- Basis: Leo Rosten's stories
- Premiere: 4 April 1968: Alvin Theatre, New York

The Education of H*Y*M*A*N K*A*P*L*A*N is a musical with lyrics and music by Oscar Brand and Paul Nassau. The musical book by Benjamin Bernard Zavin is based on Leo Rosten's stories of the fictional character Hyman Kaplan.

== Background ==
The score was written by Oscar Brand and Paul Nassau, who had collaborated on A Joyful Noise. The book changed the setting from 1930s Chicago to 1919 New York, which enabled the writers to incorporate the Palmer Raids of that period. The director was George Abbott who cast Tom Bosley in the lead - the two men had successfully worked together on Fiorello!

== Productions ==
The musical was tried out in Philadelphia, where business was so poor performances were cancelled.

The musical premiered on Broadway on April 4, 1968, at the Alvin Theatre. The show ran for 29 regular performances and 12 previews, closing on April 27, 1968. It was directed by George Abbott and the cast included Tom Bosley as Hyman Kaplan, Susan Camber as Sarah Moskowitz, Dorothy Emmerson as Eileen Higby, Nathaniel Frey as Sam Pinsky, David Gold as Reben Plonsky, Donna McKechnie as Kathy McKenna, Barbara Minkus as Rose Mitnick, Dick Latessa as Giovanni Pastora, Hal Linden as Yissel Fishbein, Maggie Task as Fanny Gidwitz, Beryl Towbin as Marie Vitale, Rufus Smith as Judge Mahon, Mimi Sloan as Mrs. Mitnick, Honey Sanders as Mrs. Moskowitz, Gary Krawford as Mr. Parkhill, Wallace Engelhardt as Officer Callahan, and Stephen Bolster as Jimmy.

Clive Barnes of The New York Times was regularly propagating the idea at the time that musicals should reflect more modern music. This prompted Brand to write a letter to the Times asking that his musical be judged fairly even though the score was more traditional.

At intermission on opening night, the audience learned of the assassination of Martin Luther King Jr. According to Ken Mandelbaum, the audience "could only think about the fastest way to get home safely." Mandelbaum further notes that the creators felt that the circumstances during opening night "caused the show to fail."

The play was profiled in the William Goldman book The Season: A Candid Look at Broadway. According to Goldman, a number of changes was made to the musical out of town. He said:

The work they did was lovely: the weaknesses at the run-through were either excised or covered over; the strengths were enlarged, made better. It was still a charm show though. No power. It needed raves to get by. "Pleasant." "Gently ingratiating." Those were the New York reviews they got in general. And they weren't enough. If Zero Mostel had been in the title role, I think the show would have gone a good two years. With Tom Bosley giving the performance of his career, it lasted 29 times and lost over $500,000.

Mandlebaum wrote it was "a nice show, with a humorous book, some good choreography by Jaime Rogers, fine performances by Bosley and the other principals, and a mediocre score with at least a few good numbers, particularly Rose's defiant Act Two showstopper, "When Will I Learn?" But the reviews were not strong enough..."

== Revivals ==
The musical was revived Off-Broadway at the American Jewish Theatre, opening in April 1989. The director was Lonny Price and Jack Hallett played Hyman.

== Plot ==
The time is 1919 to 1920, and the place is the Lower East Side of New York City. At a night class in English, Hyman Kaplan is an immigrant from Kiev, and tries to learn but has great difficulty. The teacher, Mr. Parkhill, finally concludes that Hyman cannot learn proper English.

== Songs ==
Source: IBDB

Act 1

- "Strange New World" — Mr. Parkhill
- "OOOO-EEEE" — Hyman Kaplan, Rose Mitnick, Mr. Parkhill and Students
- "A Dedicated Teacher" — Eileen Higby, Marie Vitale and Mr. Parkhill
- "Lieben Dich" — Hyman Kaplan
- "Loving You" — Rose Mitnick
- "The Day I Met Your Father" — Mrs. Mitnick
- "Anything Is Possible" — Hyman Kaplan, Students, Dancers and Singers
- "Spring in the City" — Kathy McKenna, Giovanni Pastora, Reben Plonsky, Sam Pinsky, Mrs. Moskowitz, Fanny Gidwitz, Dancers and Singers

Act 2

- "Old Fashioned Husband" — Yissel Fishbein
- "Julius Caesar" — Hyman Kaplan
- "I Never Felt Better in My Life" — Hyman Kaplan, Dancers and Singers
- "When Will I Learn" — Rose Mitnick
- "All American" — Sam Pinsky and Students
