= Die Jüdin von Toledo =

1955 novel by Lion Feuchtwanger

The Jewess of Toledo
- Author: Lion Feuchtwanger
- Original title: Die Jüdin von Toledo
- Language: German
- Set in: Toledo, Spain
- Publication date: 1955
- Publication place: Germany
- Media type: Print

Die Jüdin von Toledo is a 1955 novel by German-Jewish writer Lion Feuchtwanger. The story focuses on the "Golden Age" of Jewish culture in medieval Spain and describes the affair of Alfonso VIII with the Jewish Raquel in Toledo. In the prologue, Feuchtwanger mentions that the ballad was originally written by Alfonso X of Castile about his great-grandfather Alfonso VIII.

== Critical reception ==
Kirkus Reviews described the book thus: "The story now and again bogs down in the trappings of scholarship, but in the main is good reading."
