= The Jewess of Toledo (film) =

1919 Austrian silent historical drama film

- German: Die Jüdin von Toledo
- Directed by: Otto Kreisler
- Written by: Robert Land
- Based on: The Jewess of Toledo by Franz Grillparzer
- Starring: Franz Höbling; Ida Norden; Thea Rosenquist; Josef Viktora
- Production company: Helios Film
- Distributed by: Josef Rideg Film
- Release date: 1 August 1919
- Country: Austria
- Languages: Silent; German intertitles

The Jewess of Toledo (German: Die Jüdin von Toledo) is a 1919 Austrian silent historical drama film directed by Otto Kreisler and starring Franz Höbling, Ida Norden and Thea Rosenquist. It is an adaptation of the 1851 play The Jewess of Toledo by Franz Grillparzer which was based on the relationship between Alfonso VIII of Castile and Rahel la Fermosa in 12th century Spain.

== Cast ==
- Franz Höbling as Alfonso VIII of Castile
- Ida Norden as Eleanor of England, Queen of Castile
- Leopold Iwald as Count Manrique de Lara
- Josef Viktora as Garzarrah
- Theodor Weiß as Isaak
- Emmy Flemmich as Esther
- Thea Rosenquist as Rahel
