= Leo Rosten =

American humorist and lexicographer (1908–1997)

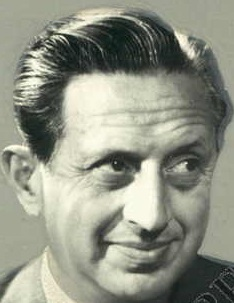
- Rosten in 1959
- Born: 11 April 1908; Łódź, Russian Empire
- Died: 19 February 1997 (aged 88); New York, USA
- Citizenship: American
- Education: University of Chicago (PhD); London School of Economics and Political Science
- Occupations: Novelist; script writer; government official; journalist; teacher; political scientist; public lecturer
- Employer(s): University of Chicago; Office of War Information; Rand Corporation; Hollywood; Columbia University; Yale University
- Spouse(s): Priscilla Ann "Pam" Mead (m. 1925–1959) Gertrude Zimmerman (m. 1960–1995)
- Parent(s): Samuel Rosten (father); Ida (née Freundlich) Rosten (mother)
- Writing career
- Pen name: Leonard Q. Ross
- Language: English
- Notable works: The Education of H*Y*M*A*N K*A*P*L*A*N (1937); The Return of H*Y*M*A*N K*A*P*L*A*N (1959); The Joys of Yiddish (1968)

Leo Calvin Rosten (Yiddish: ליאָ קאַלװין ראָסטען; April 11, 1908 – February 19, 1997) was an American writer and humorist in the fields of scriptwriting, storywriting, journalism, and Yiddish lexicography.

== Early life ==
Rosten was born into a Yiddish-speaking family in Łódź, Russian Empire (now in Poland), and immigrated to the United States with his family in 1911 when he was three. His parents were Samuel Rosten and Ida Freundlich Rosten, both trade unionists. They opened a knitting shop in the Greater Lawndale area of Chicago, where Rosten and his younger sister grew up among other working-class Jewish families.

Like their neighbors, the children spoke both English and Yiddish. Rosten showed an interest in books and language very early and began writing stories when he was only nine. During the Great Depression, when he was unable to find other work, he taught English for recent immigrants at night. These experiences eventually became the source of his most popular works, The Education of H*Y*M*A*N K*A*P*L*A*N and The Return of H*Y*M*A*N K*A*P*L*A*N.

Rosten studied political science, economics, and psychology at both the University of Chicago, where he obtained his doctorate in political science, and the London School of Economics. From this time date his life-long friendships with Milton Friedman, W. Allen Wallis and other economists who would become influential in forming American neoliberalism. Unlike them, Rosten did not become a member of the Mont Pèlerin Society.

== Career ==
Like other University of Chicago graduates, during the war he worked in Franklin D. Roosevelt's administration, in his case both as deputy director at the Office of War Information and as assistant to Lowell Mellett, one of Roosevelt's aides. (It was at the Department of War that he made a notable contribution to Franco-American relations: 112 Gripes About the French.) After the war, his connection with Allen Wallis led to his involvement with forming the Social Sciences division at the RAND Corporation. Although Rosten, who was already involved in Hollywood at this point, did not work full-time at RAND, he was an influential consultant on human psychology and put RAND in contact with several influential academics such as Hans Speier and Bernard Brodie. He also suggested that RAND contact the Ford Foundation for funding.

== Scriptwriter ==
Rosten was also a successful screenwriter. He wrote the story for The Dark Corner (1946), a film noir starring Mark Stevens, and Lured, the Douglas Sirk-directed period drama starring Charles Coburn; both films featured Lucille Ball. He is listed as one of the writers for Captain Newman, M.D. (1963) adapted from his novel of the same title. Other films: Mechanized Patrolling (1943; as Leonard Q. Ross), They Got Me Covered (1943) (story; as Leonard Q. Ross), All Through the Night (1942) (story; as Leonard Q. Ross), The Conspirators (1944) (screenplay), The Velvet Touch (1948), Sleep, My Love (1948) (novel) (screenplay), Double Dynamite (1954) (story), Walk East on Beacon (1952), and Mister Cory (1957) (story).

== Stories and books ==
But funny is funny. Look at Leo Rosten. He's the Jewish James Thurber. The kind of writer who makes you laugh out loud. I made a friend of mine read The Education of H*Y*M*A*N K*A*P*L*A*N – she's Boston Italian – and she agreed. But the world of that generation is disappearing. The same with Thurber. That small-town Ohio life: That world is gone. But you can still discover it in a book. That's why people should read.

— Fran Lebowitz

External audio
- Leo Rosten Analyzes Humor, 1959, Rosten speaks 3:34-16:00, WNYC Archives

Rosten is best remembered for his stories about the night-school "prodigy" Hyman Kaplan, written under the pseudonym Leonard Q. Ross. They were published in The New Yorker from 1935 and collected in two volumes published in 1937 and 1959, The Education of H*Y*M*A*N K*A*P*L*A*N and The Return of H*Y*M*A*N K*A*P*L*A*N. The Education was a "close second" for one U.S. National Book Award in 1938. (Note: Probably that award was the Most Original Book of 1937. See Hyman Kaplan for more information.) The second collection was one of eighteen National Book Award for Fiction finalists in 1960. (See The Education of H*Y*M*A*N K*A*P*L*A*N for the musical rendition.)

He is also well known for his encyclopedic The Joys of Yiddish (1968), a guide to Yiddish and to Jewish culture including anecdotes and Jewish humor. It was followed by O K*A*P*L*A*N! My K*A*P*L*A*N! (1976), a reworking of the two 1930s collections, and Hooray for Yiddish! (1982), a humorous lexicon of the American language as influenced by Jewish culture. Another Rosten work is Leo Rosten's Treasury of Jewish Quotations.

== Quotations ==
Among his own many quotations are "A conservative is one who admires radicals centuries after they're dead," "Truth is stranger than fiction; fiction has to make sense," "We see things as we are, not as they are," and "The purpose of life is not to be happy at all. It is to be useful, to be honorable. It is to be compassionate. It is to matter, to have it make some difference that you lived." (A version of this quotation is sometimes attributed, falsely, to Ralph Waldo Emerson.)

At a tribute dinner to fellow humorist W. C. Fields, Rosten came up with the remark about Fields that "Any man who hates dogs and babies can't be all bad." This statement is often misattributed to Fields himself.

In his book The Joys of Yiddish, he defines the word chutzpah as "that quality enshrined in a man who, having killed his mother and father, throws himself on the mercy of the court because he is an orphan." In his novel Silky, he defines "nebbish" as "The kind of person, when he leaves a room, you have the feeling someone fascinating just walked in."

== Personal life ==
On March 30, 1935, Rosten married Priscilla Ann "Pam" Mead (1911–1959), a fellow graduate student at the University of Chicago and sister of anthropologist Margaret Mead. Rosten's marriage to Mead also made him a brother-in-law of William Steig and the uncle of Jeremy Steig and Mary Catherine Bateson. They had two daughters: Madeline Rosten and Margaret Ramsey Rosten; and a son, Philip Rosten (1938–1996), and six grandchildren: Josh and Ben Lee (Madeline), Seth Muir (Margaret), and Alexander, Carrie and Pamela Rosten (Phillip). Carrie followed in her grandfather's literary footsteps and has written three books, including a young adult novel, Chloe Leiberman (Sometimes Wong). Leo's and Pam's marriage ended in divorce in 1959; she took her own life on December 1 the same year. Rosten's second wife, whom he married January 5, 1960, was Gertrude Zimmerman (1915–1995).

Rosten died in New York City in 1997 at age 88. His obituary in The Independent on February 21, 1997, written by Chaim Bermant, describes his personality as follows:

Rosten was an inveterate Anglophile. He had enjoyed his years at LSE, was amazed by the enthusiastic reception Kaplan had received in the English press, and returned to London whenever opportunity dictated and even when it didn't. He lived in considerable luxury in a penthouse flat in Sutton Place, one of the most exclusive areas of New York, and rented a mews flat in Mayfair. England represented the tranquillity he could not find in America. He loved to rummage in English bookshops and wear English clothes — he contrived to display a subdued elegance — to go to the London theatres and entertain and be entertained in London clubs. He himself was a member of the Savile, the Reform and the Garrick.

== Books ==
Maxim Lieber served as his literary editor, 1935–1938.

=== Hyman Kaplan ===
- Short stories by Leonard Q. Ross (The New Yorker, 1930s)
- Ross, Leonard Q. (1937). The Education of H*Y*M*A*N K*A*P*L*A*N. Harcourt, Brace – via Internet Archive. PZ3.R7386 Ed

—"close second" for a U.S. National Book Award

- The Return of H*Y*M*A*N K*A*P*L*A*N (Harper, 1959) OCLC 391898; PZ3.R7386 Re

—National Book Award for Fiction finalist

- O K*A*P*L*A*N! My K*A*P*L*A*N! (Harper & Row, 1976) ISBN 0-060-13676-6; PZ3.R7386 Oad

—"New, completely rewritten H*y*m*a*n K*a*p*l*a*n, combining The education and The return with a new introduction." (Library of Congress Online Catalog)

=== Other ===
- Hollywood: The Movie Colony, the Movie Makers (Harcourt, Brace and Company, 1941)
- All Through the Night (1941) (story; as Leonard Q. Ross)
- They Got Me Covered (1943) (story; as Leonard Q. Ross)
- Mechanized Patrolling (1943; as Leonard Q. Ross)
- The Conspirators (1944) (screenplay)
- The Dark Corner (1946) (story)
- Lured (1947)
- Sleep, My Love (1948) (novel) (screenplay)
- The Velvet Touch (1948)
- Double Dynamite (1951) (story)
- Walk East on Beacon! (1952)
- Mister Cory (1957) (story)
- Captain Newman, M.D. (1961) (novel)
- Leo Rosten Bedside Book (1962)
- A Most Private Intrigue (1967)
- The Joys of Yiddish (1968)
- People I Have Loved, Known or Admired (1970)
- A Trumpet for Reason (1970)
- Rome Wasn't Burned In a Day: The Mischief of Language (1972) — illustrated by Robert Day
- Home is Where to Learn How to Hate (1973)
- The Washington Correspondents (Politics and People) (1974)
- Dear (1975)
- The Cook Book (1975)
- Leo Rosten, ed. (1975). Religions of America: Ferment and Faith in an Age of Crisis: A New Guide and Almanac. New York: Simon and Schuster. ISBN 0-671-21970-7. OCLC 1093360.
- Dear Herm (1975)
- The 3:10 to anywhere (1976)
- Look Book (1976)
- Leo Rosten's Treasury of Jewish Quotations (1977)
- The Power of Positive Nonsense
- Passions & Prejudices: Or, Some of My Best Friends Are People (1978)
- Silky. A Detective Story (1979)
- Infinite Riches (1979)
- King Silky (1981)
- Hooray for Yiddish: A Book About English
- Giant Book of Laughter (1985)
- Leo Rosten's Book of Laughter (1986)
- Hebrew-English Lexicon of the Bible (1987)
- The Joys of Yinglish (1988)
- Leo Rosten's Giant Book of Laugh (1989)
- Leo Rosten's Carnival of Wit: From Aristotle to Woody Allen (1996)
- Leo Rosten Five Stories from Five Faiths, a portfolio (10.5"×13") of five stories with five photos by Art Kane. First published in McCall's magazine in June 1960.
