= Otto Kreisler =

Austrian film director (1890–1970)

- Born: 1 November 1890; Vienna, Austro-Hungarian Empire
- Died: 1970 (aged 79–80); London, United Kingdom
- Occupation: Film director
- Years active: 1918-1922 (film)

Otto Kreisler (1890–1970) was an Austrian film director of the silent era. Kreisler was of Jewish background, and directed films with largely Jewish themes such as The Jewess of Toledo and Theodor Herzl, Standard-Bearer of the Jewish People. He was later forced to emigrate to Britain due to the Nazis.

== Selected filmography ==
- Summer Idyll (1916)
- The Jewess of Toledo (1919)
- Maria Magdalena (1919)
- Wandering Jew (1920)
- Theodor Herzl (1921)
- Ludwig II (1922)

== Bibliography ==
- Holmes, Deborah & Silverman, Lisa. Interwar Vienna: Culture Between Tradition and Modernity. Camden House, 2009.
- Dassanowsky, Robert. Austrian Cinema: A History. McFarland & Company Incorporated Pub, 2005.
