= Hyman Kaplan =

Fictional character

- First appearance: The New Yorker (1935)
- Created by: Leo Rosten

In-universe information
- Gender: Male
- Occupation: Garment worker
- Nationality: Ukrainian

Hyman Kaplan, or H*Y*M*A*N K*A*P*L*A*N as he habitually signs himself, is a fictional character in a series of well-received humorous stories by Leo Rosten, published under the pseudonym "Leonard Q. Ross" in The New Yorker in the 1930s and later collected in two books, The Education of H*Y*M*A*N K*A*P*L*A*N and The Return of H*Y*M*A*N K*A*P*L*A*N. Rosten noted that he was frequently asked if Mr Kaplan was his alter ego, and that he often felt it was the other way around.

The first collection (Education, 1937) was a "close second" for one U.S. National Book Award in 1938. (Note: For 1937 the American Booksellers Association gave awards in four categories, of which Hyman Kaplan may have been a contender for the Fiction, the Bookseller Discovery, or the Most Original Book, most likely the latter (not the Nonfiction award). Next-day coverage by The New York Times named the four Awards and their winners first, of course, and later named the four "close seconds" in order that cannot match. The Most Original Book and The Education of Hyman Kaplan were both fourth on their respective lists.) The second collection (Return, 1959) was one of eighteen National Book Award for Fiction finalists in 1960.

With many changes, Rosten rewrote the two books as one, published as O K*A*P*L*A*N! My K*A*P*L*A*N! in 1976.

The books were adapted as a musical play produced in 1968, namely The Education of H*Y*M*A*N K*A*P*L*A*N.

== Hyman Kaplan ==
Mr. Kaplan is an immigrant and a pupil at a New York night class in English. He is extremely diligent and enthusiastic, but seems completely incapable of learning: the teacher, Mr. Parkhill, is eventually driven to conclude that, although Mr. Kaplan admits that English has rules – "good rules, sensible rules" – he is quite unable to admit that the rules apply to him. (In The Return of H*Y*M*A*N K*A*P*L*A*N, Kaplan's English pronunciation has improved substantially between semesters.)

Mr. Kaplan is extroverted and highly assertive, particularly when his moral sense has been outraged by some perceived injustice in class or in American history, and he frequently gets into noisy disagreements with other class members.

Mr. Kaplan usually signs his name in colored crayon with green stars between red letters outlined in blue. In the last story of all, "Mr. K*A*P*L*A*N the Eumoirous", he signs a note to his teacher simply "Hyman Kaplan", but addresses it to "Mr. P*A*R*K*H*I*L*L". Mr. Parkhill wonders if he will ever again be so honored.

Mr. Kaplan was born in Kiev, has lived in America for fifteen years, and claims (on Columbus Day) that his birthday is October 12. From his pronunciation of English (the characters' various idioms are a major source of the stories' humor), it appears that Mr. Kaplan's native language is Yiddish. This would seem to be confirmed when Kaplan calls flowers "bloomers", and a fellow student reminds him not to mix up two languages, leading the teacher to reflect that Mr. Kaplan's native language refers to flowers as Blumen.

== The teacher ==
Mr. Parkhill is the point-of-view character in the stories, a staid, kind-hearted, mild-mannered teacher with a tendency to think of his pupils in terms of classical literature. Mr. Parkhill is rigorously fair-minded, often to his own detriment when faced with Mr. Kaplan's very individual brand of logic. He is also a lonely and rather tragic character: when the class present him with a new briefcase with the initials "M.P." on it as a birthday present, he is at first puzzled since his first name does not begin with M; then realizes that the letters stand for "Mr. Parkhill" and that he cannot remember the last time anyone addressed him by his first name.

== Other members of the class ==
- Mr. Norman Bloom (in the first book) and Mr. Reuben Plonsky (in the second book; renamed Olansky in the combined version), both of whom are better than Mr. Kaplan at grasping the rules of English, but who somehow end up on the losing side of the arguments that erupt between them.
- Miss Rose Mitnick, a quiet, shy young woman whose grasp of English is almost perfect, but who generally withers before the force of Mr. Kaplan's rhetorical passion. Eventually she starts a relationship with the ebullient Nathan P. Nathan.
- Mrs Sadie Moskowitz, characterized by Mr. Parkhill as "the Niobe of the beginners' grade", a large, lugubrious middle-aged lady who is baffled by the English language and spends much of the time asleep, waking only to punctuate a particularly intimidating fact with a despairing exclamation of "Oy!"
- Miss Olga Tarnova, an emotional old Russian woman, a retired ballerina who recalls the Imperial days with nostalgia and despises Communism. Her compositions often deal either with her former life or with her interest in Spiritualism.
- Mr. Sam Pinsky, a loyal ally of Mr Kaplan.
- Miss Carmen Caravello, an Italian woman prone to loud disagreement with Mr. Kaplan.
- Gus Matsoukas, the only Greek in the class, whose dogged pursuit of English is accompanied by near-constant muttering to himself. His one moment of enthusiasm comes when Mr. Parkhill begins pointing out how many English words have Greek roots. He eventually returns to Greece.

== Bibliography ==
Hyman Kaplan is featured in three books by Rosten.

- The education of H*Y*M*A*N K*A*P*L*A*N by Leonard Q. Ross. New York: Harcourt, Brace. 1937. PZ3.R7386 Ed
- The return of H*Y*M*A*N K*A*P*L*A*N. New York: Harper. 1959. (OCoLC)391898; PZ3.R7386 Re
- O K*A*P*L*A*N! My K*A*P*L*A*N!. New York: Harper & Row. 1976. ISBN 0-06-013676-6; PZ3.R7386 Oad — "New, completely rewritten H*y*m*a*n K*a*p*l*a*n, combining The education and The return with a new introduction." (Library of Congress Online Catalog)
