= Monogram =

Motif made by overlapping two or more letters

A monogram is a motif made by overlapping or combining two or more letters or other graphemes to form one symbol. Monograms are often made by combining the initials of an individual or a company, used as recognizable symbols or logos. A series of uncombined initials is properly referred to as a cypher (e.g. a royal cypher) and is not a monogram.

Many of today's monograms are embroidered on items for the homes, such as towels, bedding and robes.

== History ==
The "AD" monogram that Albrecht Dürer used as a signature

Monograms first appeared on coins, as early as 350 BC. The earliest known examples are of the names of Greek states which issued the coins, often the first two letters of their name. For example, the monogram of Achaea consisted of the letters alpha (Α) and chi (Χ) joined together.

Monograms have been used as signatures by artists and craft workers on paintings, sculptures and pieces of furniture, especially when guilds enforced measures against unauthorized participation in the trade. A famous example of a monogram serving as an artist's signature is the "AD" used by Albrecht Dürer.

== Christograms ==
Over the centuries, monograms of the name of Jesus Christ have been used as Christian symbols. The IX monogram consists of the initial Greek letters of the name "Jesus Christ," "I" for Ιησούς, (Jesus in Greek) and "X" for Χριστος (Christ in Greek). The "IHS" Christogram, denoting the first three letters of the Greek name of Jesus, is usually written as a cypher, but sometimes as a monogram. Perhaps the most significant Christogram is the Chi Rho, formed from the first two letters of Χριστος. The symbol was used by the Roman emperor Constantine I (r. 306–337) as part of a military standard.

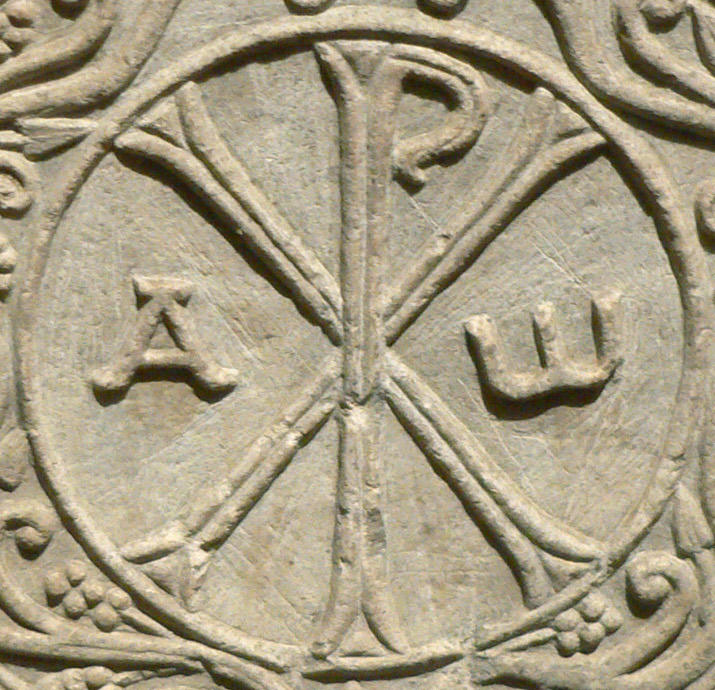
The Chi-Rho, a monogram of the first two letters of the Greek word for Christ

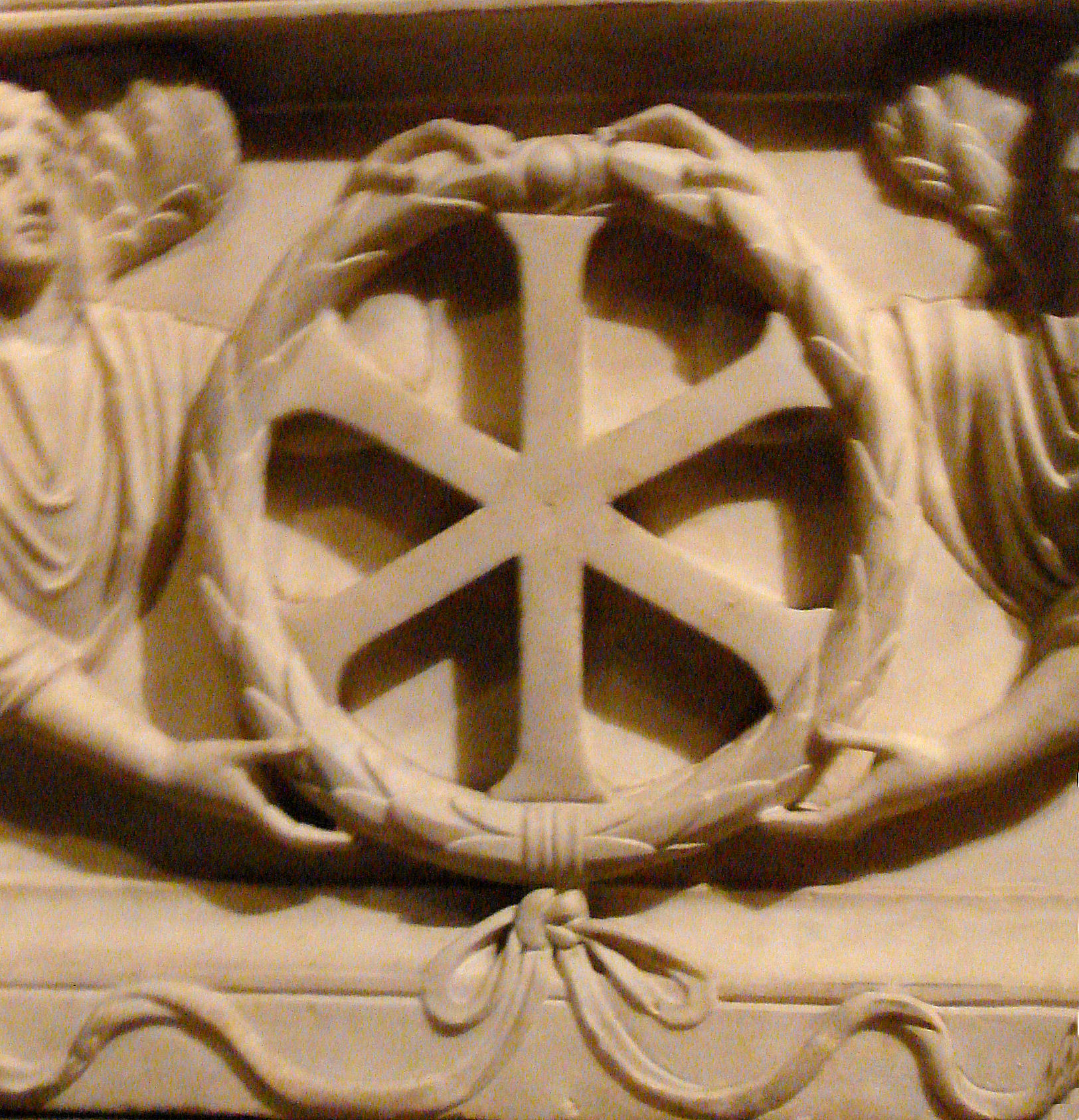
The IX monogram

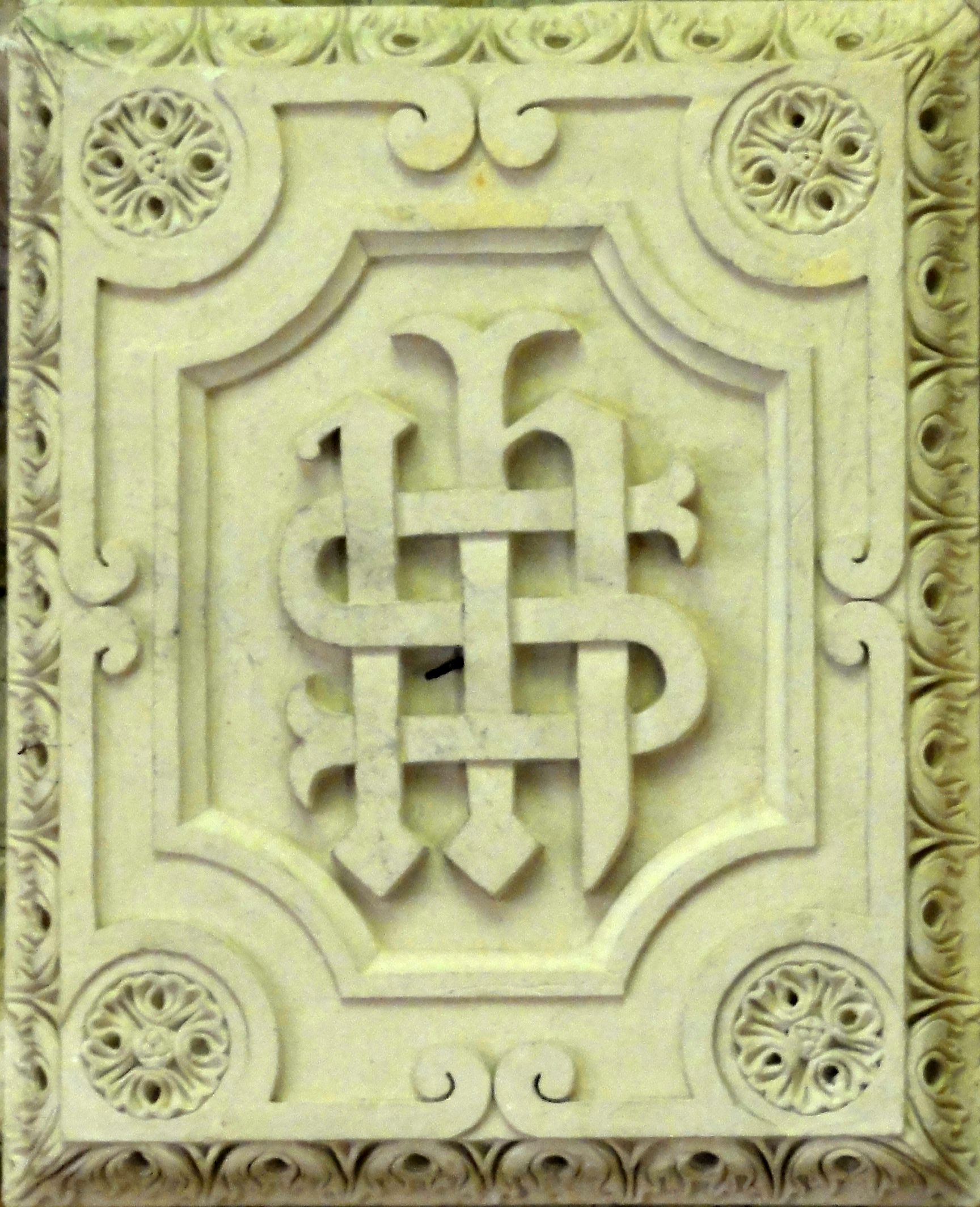
IHS monogram

== Royal monograms ==
Karolus – The cross-signature of Charlemagne

Signum manus (sometimes also known as Chrismon) refers to the medieval practice, current from the Merovingian period until the 14th century in the Frankish Empire and its successors, of signing a document or charter with a special type of monogram or royal cypher.

Monograms of the names of monarchs are used as part of the insignia of public organizations in kingdoms, such as on police badges. This indicates a connection to the ruler. However, many royal cyphers are not technically monograms, since the letters are not combined.

Royal monograms often appear on coins, frequently surmounted by a crown. Countries that have employed this device in the past include Bulgaria, Great Britain, Russia, Sweden and many German states. Today, several Danish coins carry the monogram of Margrethe II, while the current Norwegian 1 Krone coin has the "H5" monogram of Harald V on the obverse. The only countries using the Euro to have a royal monogram as their national identifying mark are Belgium and Monaco. In Thailand, royal monograms appear on the individual flag for each major royal family member.

== Individual monograms ==
Dress shirt monogram locations

An individual's monogram may appear in stylized form on stationery, luggage, clothing, or other personalized items. These monograms may have two or three letters.

A basic 3-letter monogram has the initial of the individual's last name (surname) set larger, or with some special treatment in the center, while the first name initial appears to the left of it and the middle name initial appears to the right of it. There is a difference in how this is written for men and women. For example, if the individual's name is Mary Ann Jones, and Jones is the surname, then the arrangement of letters would be thus: MJA, with the surname initial set larger in the center, the M for Mary to the left and the A for Ann to the right. This style of monogram is popular in the American South and commonly used on household linens. Traditionally, individual monograms for men are based on the order of the name. The name Kyle George Martin would be written (KGM).

Married or engaged couples may use two-letter monograms of their entwined initials, for example on wedding invitations. Married couples may also create three-letter monograms incorporating the initial of their shared surname. For example, the monogram MJA might be used for Michael and Alice Jones. However, monogramming etiquette for the married couple varies according to the item being monogrammed. Linens, for example, typically list the woman's given initial first, followed by the couple's shared surname initial and then the man's given initial (AJM). Monograms can often be found on custom dress shirts where they can be located in a number of different positions.

Some personal monograms have become recognizable symbols in their own right, such as the monogram used by J. R. R. Tolkien.

== Other monograms ==
The University of Texas monogram

Some companies and organizations adopt a monogram for a logo, usually with the letters of their acronym. For example, as well as having an official seal, and the Texas Longhorns logo, the University of Texas at Austin uses a "UT" monogram (in the same color as the Longhorns logo, burnt orange). The New York Yankees, Los Angeles Dodgers, among others baseball teams, also use a monogram on their ball cap insignia. The Consolidated Edison logo, with a rounded "E" nested inside a "C", has been described as a "classic emblem."

Many fashion companies have a monogram for a logo, including Louis Vuitton and Fendi. The connected "CC" company logo, created by Coco Chanel, is one of the most recognizable monograms internationally.

The victor is a monogram of the Latin victor or Spanish vítor painted on Spanish and Hispanic universities to celebrate a student receiving a doctorate.

Athletes have also been known to brand merchandise with their monogram logo; notably Tiger Woods and Roger Federer.

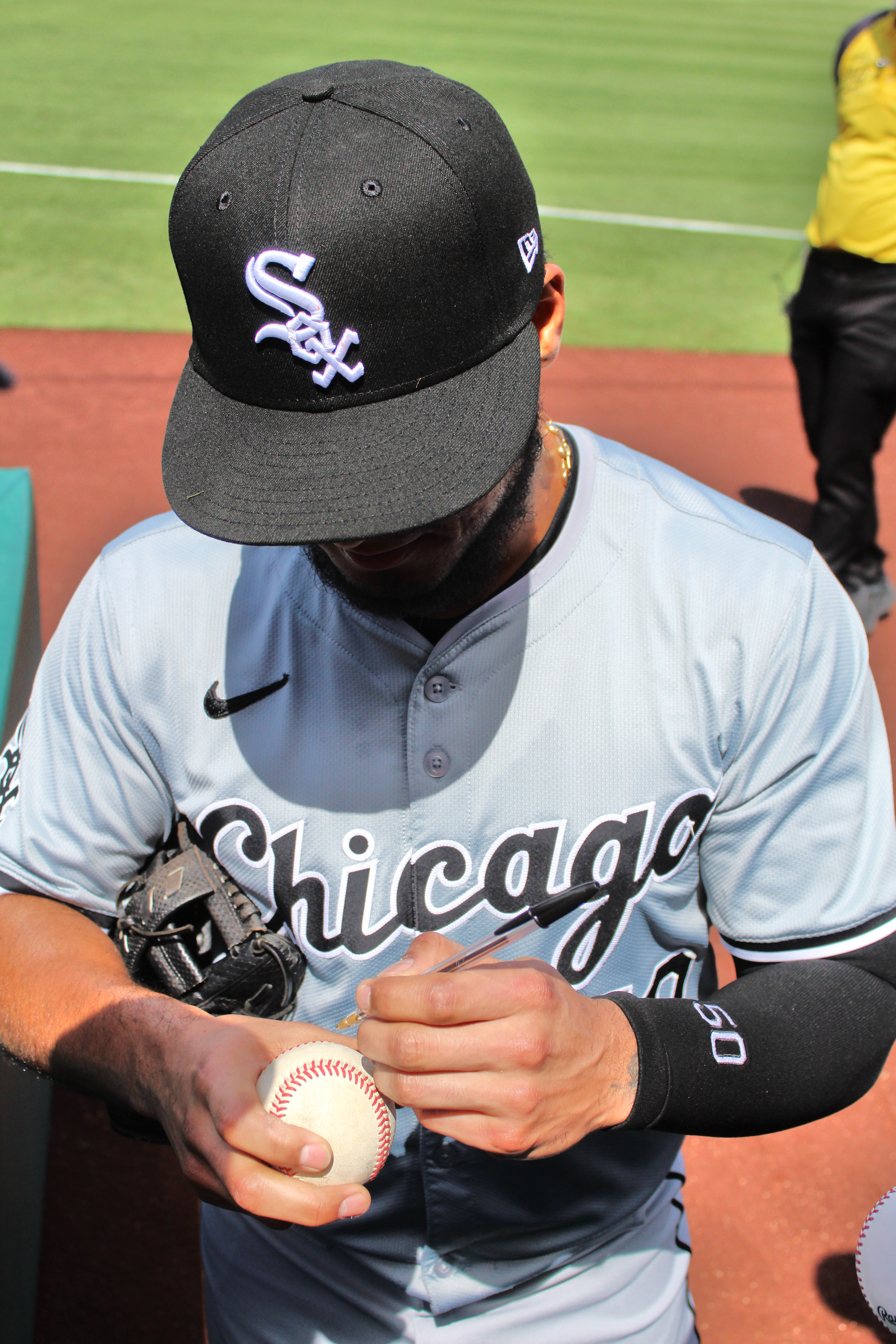
Chicago White Sox

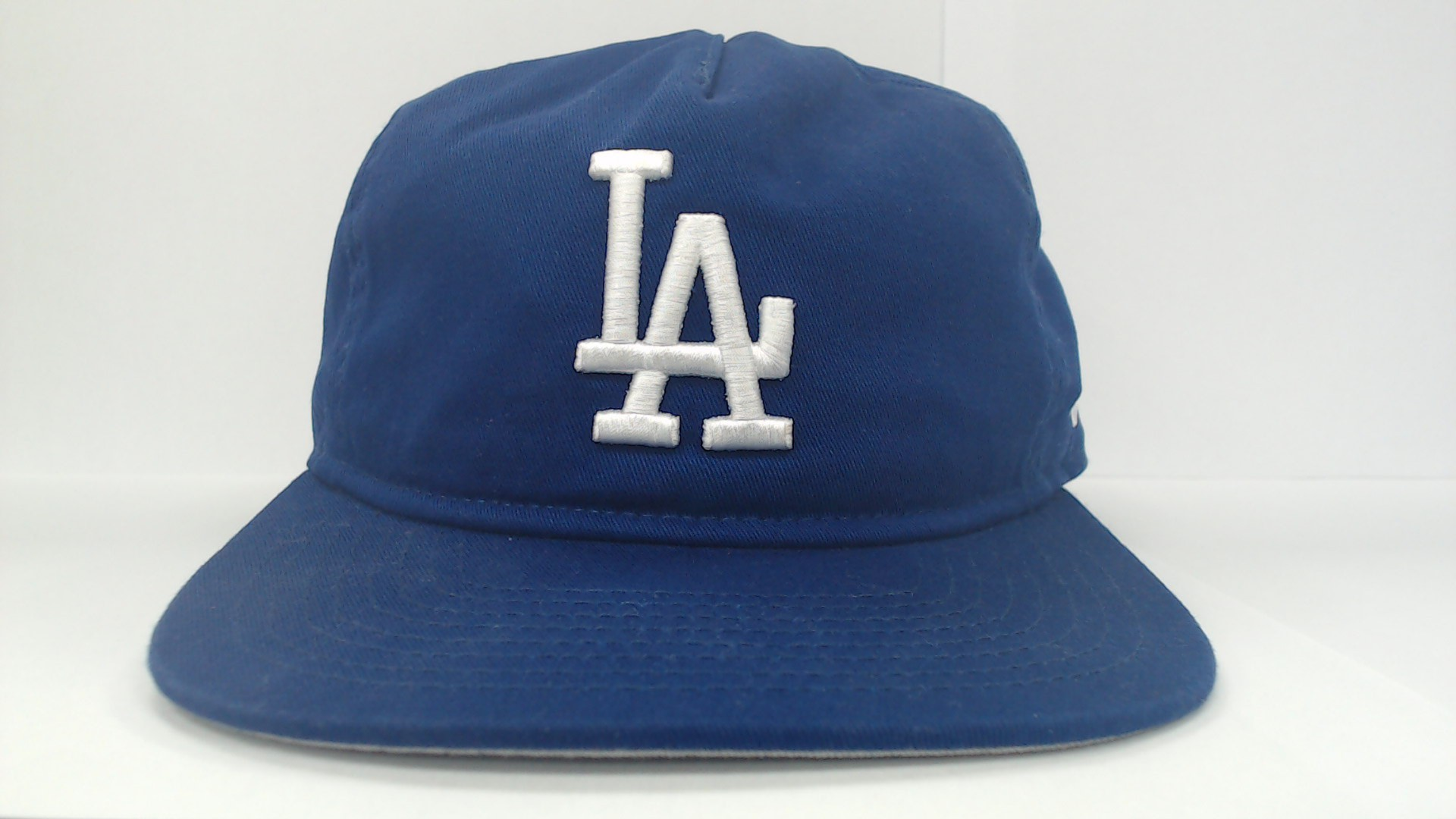
Los Angeles Dodgers

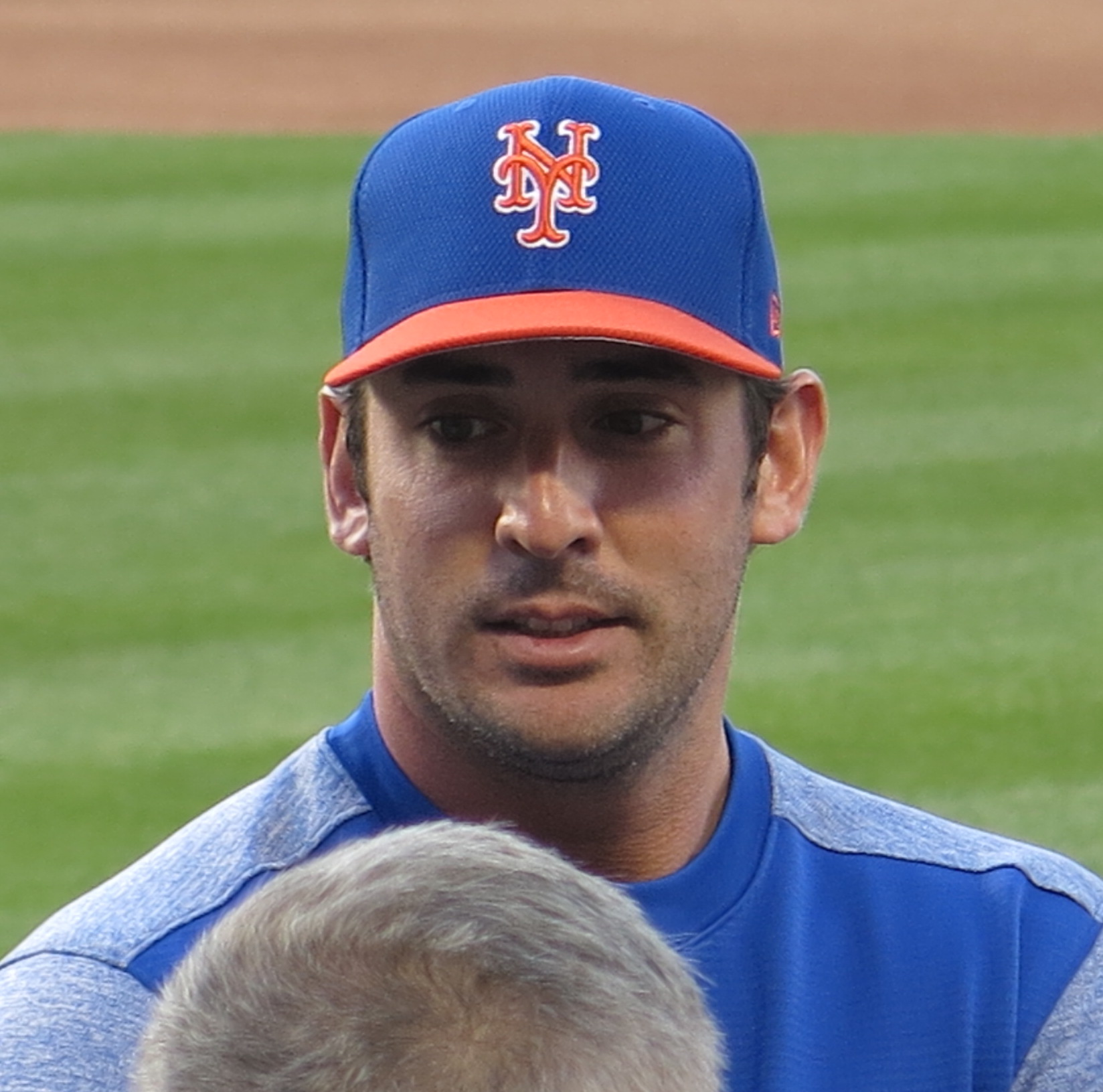
New York Mets

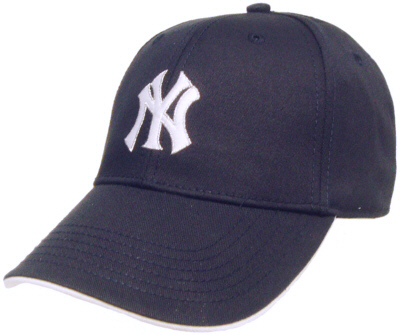
New York Yankees

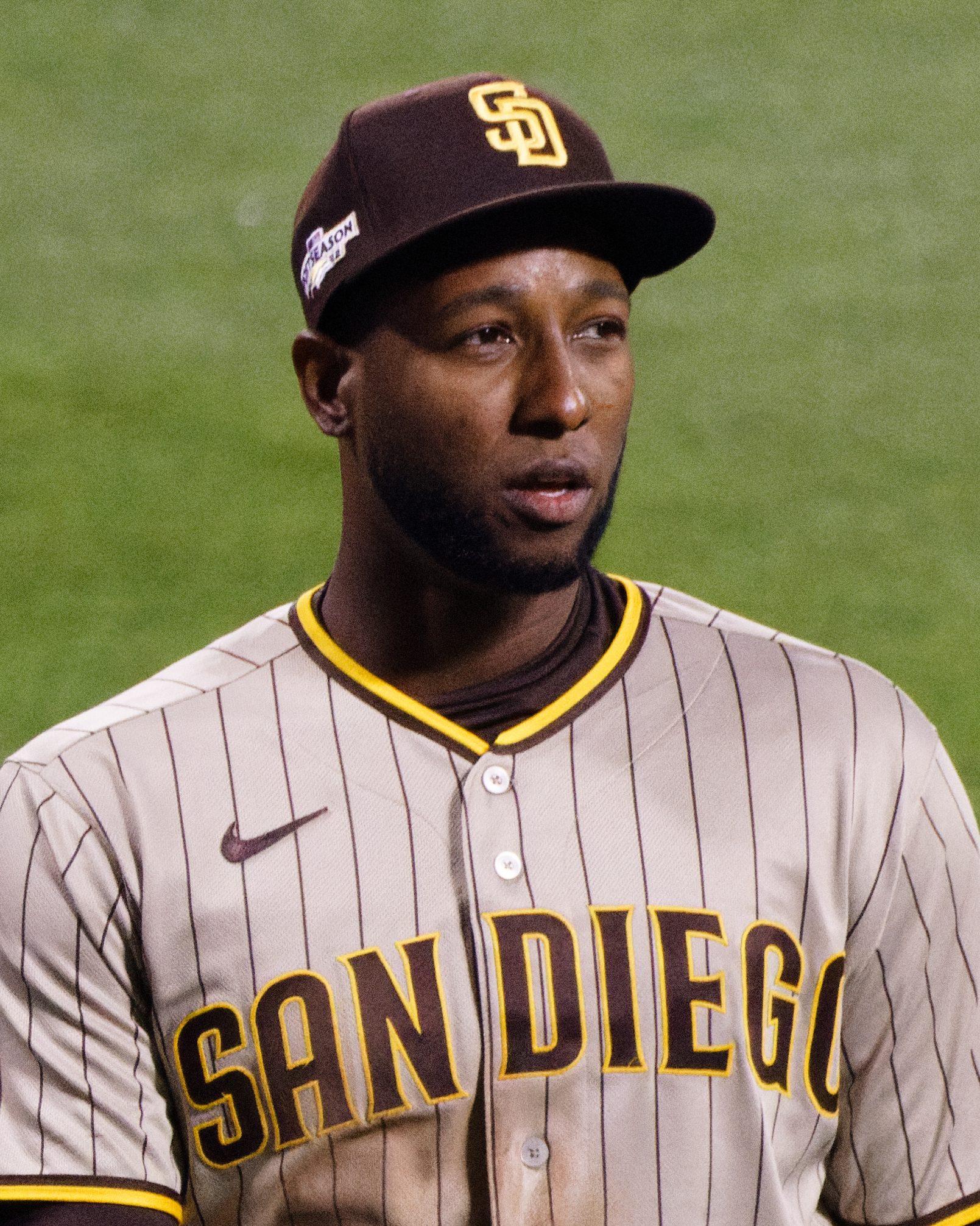
San Diego Padres

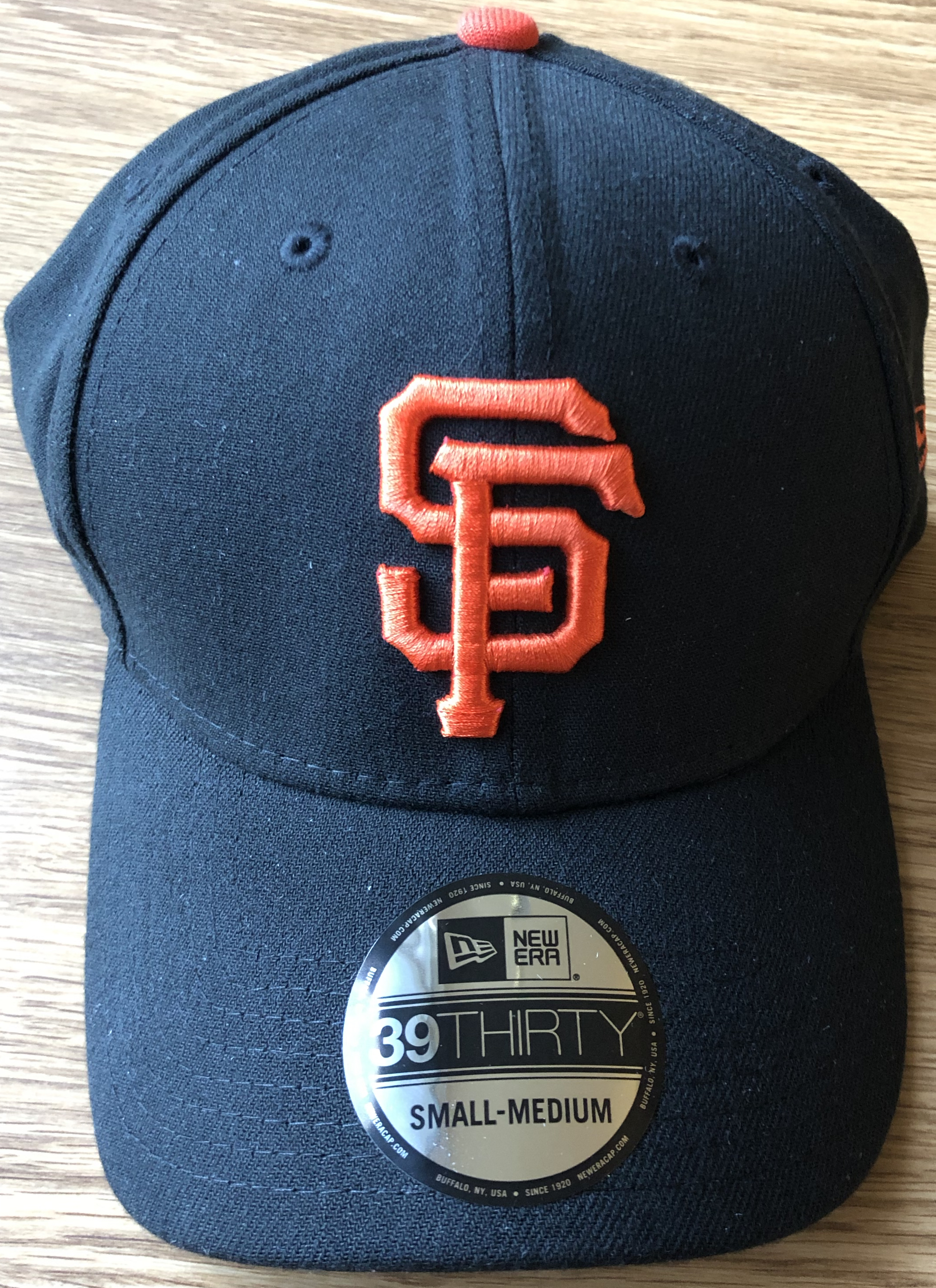
San Francisco Giants

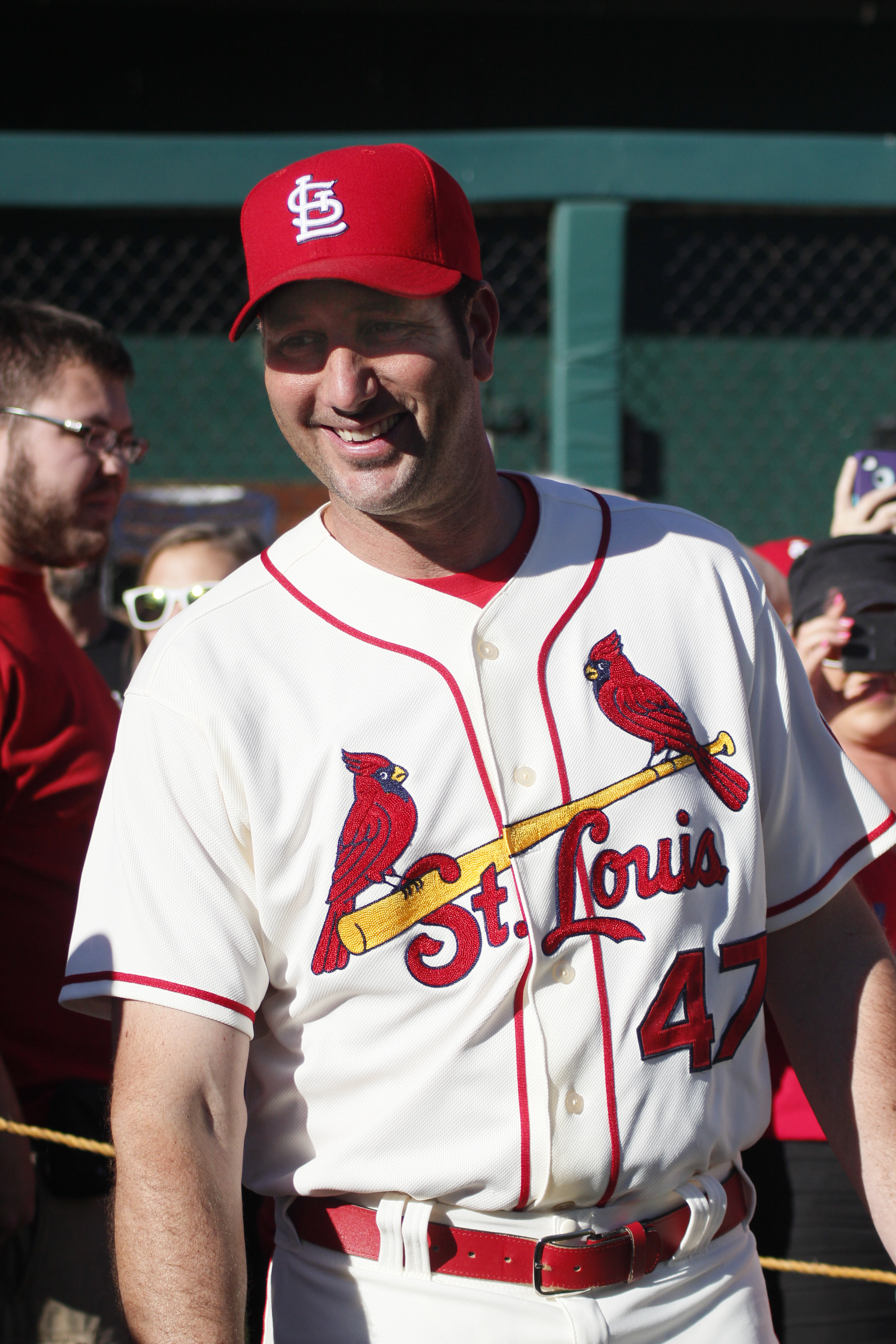
Saint Louis Cardinals

Monograms are a recurrent motif in baseball caps.

== Resistance symbols in wartime ==
A notable example of a royal monogram is the H7 monogram of King Haakon VII of Norway. While in exile during World War II, Haakon VII spearheaded the Norwegian resistance to the German occupation, and H7 became a symbol used by the Norwegian populace to mark solidarity and loyalty to the King, and adherence to the Norwegian resistance movement. The act of drawing or creating a H7 symbol in German-occupied Norway was punishable by imprisonment.

Similarly, in Poland during the war, the "PW" monogram was used as a resistance symbol, known as 'The Anchor' (Polish: Kotwica), due to its characteristic shape. Its meaning varied, as the initials were useful for many different slogans, such as 'Poland Fights', 'Warsaw Uprising', 'Polish Army', and others. Like the Norwegian example above, its use was punished by the Nazi occupation authorities. Another example is the monogram of La Liga Filipina. The monogram sees the letters L and F as well as two hexagons.

Polska Walcząca – "Fighting Poland"

Monogram of LLF

== Zirkel ==
In the Germanosphere, certain student societies (Studentenverbindung) use monograms known as Zirkel ("circle", as in "circle of friends"), consisting of the initial letter of the organization's name and/or the letters v, c, f or e, f, v, together with an exclamation mark if the society is still active.

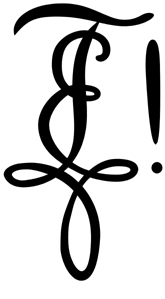
Zirkel composed of E, F, V.

== Japanese ==
A Japanese rebus monogram is a monogram in a particular style, which spells a name via a rebus, as a form of Japanese wordplay or visual pun. Today they are most often seen in corporate logos or product logos.

== Gallery ==
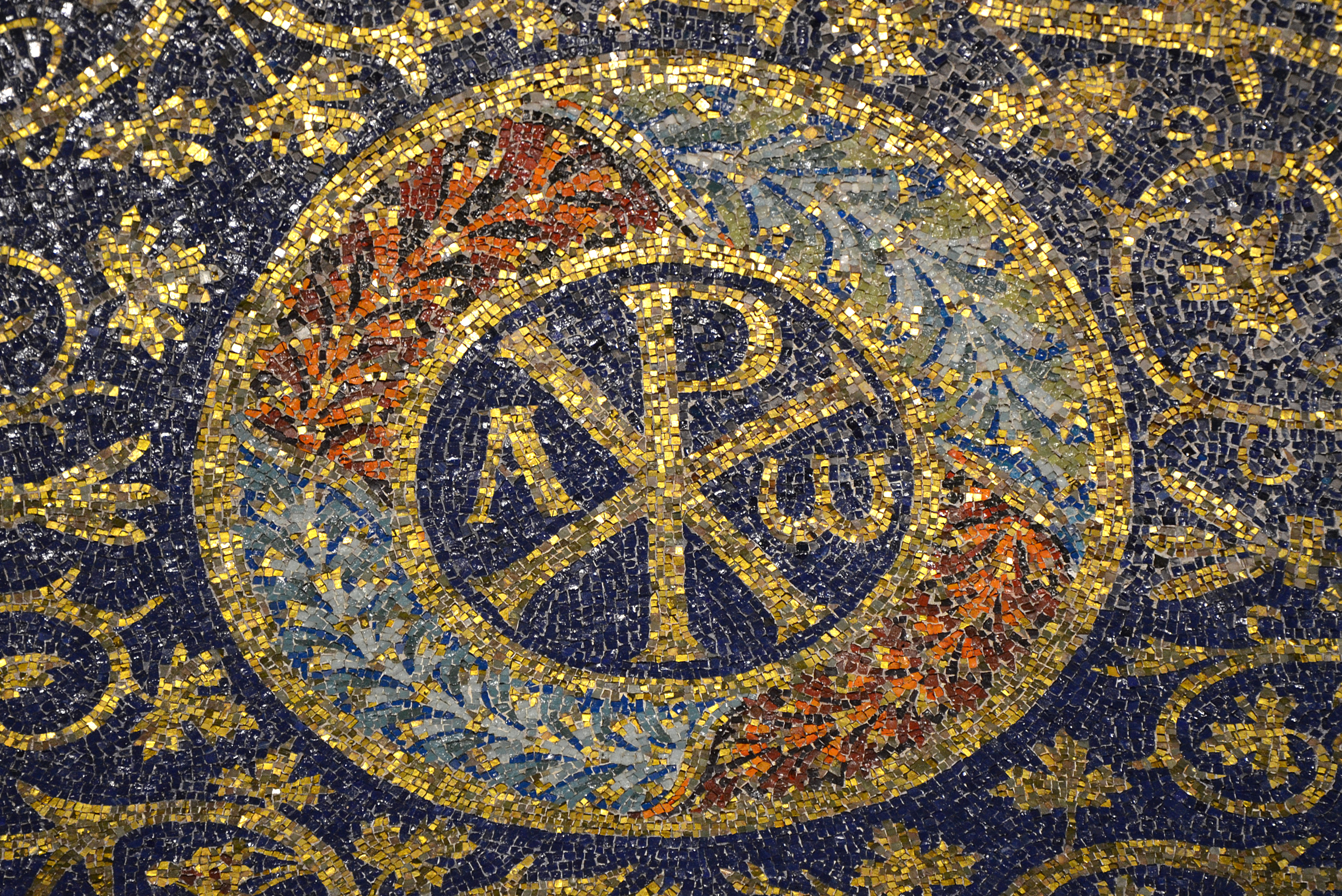
Late Roman-early Byzantine Chi Rho and Alpha and Omega monogram in the Mausoleum of Galla Placidia, Ravenna, Italy, unknown architect or mosaic craftsman, 425-450

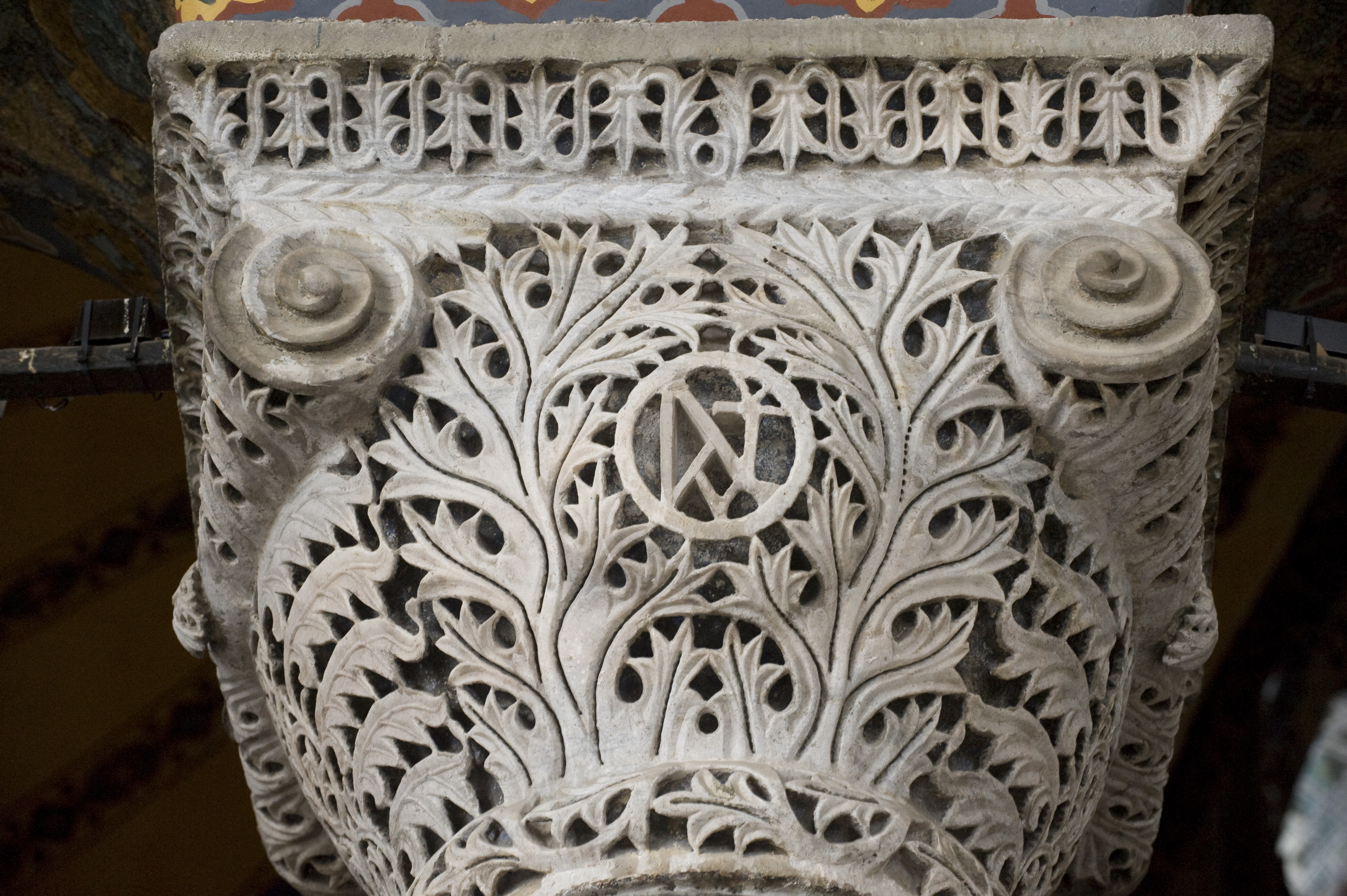
Byzantine monogram of Justinian I in Hagia Sophia, Istanbul, Turkey, unknown sculptor, capital designed by Anthemius of Tralles and Isidore of Miletus, 537

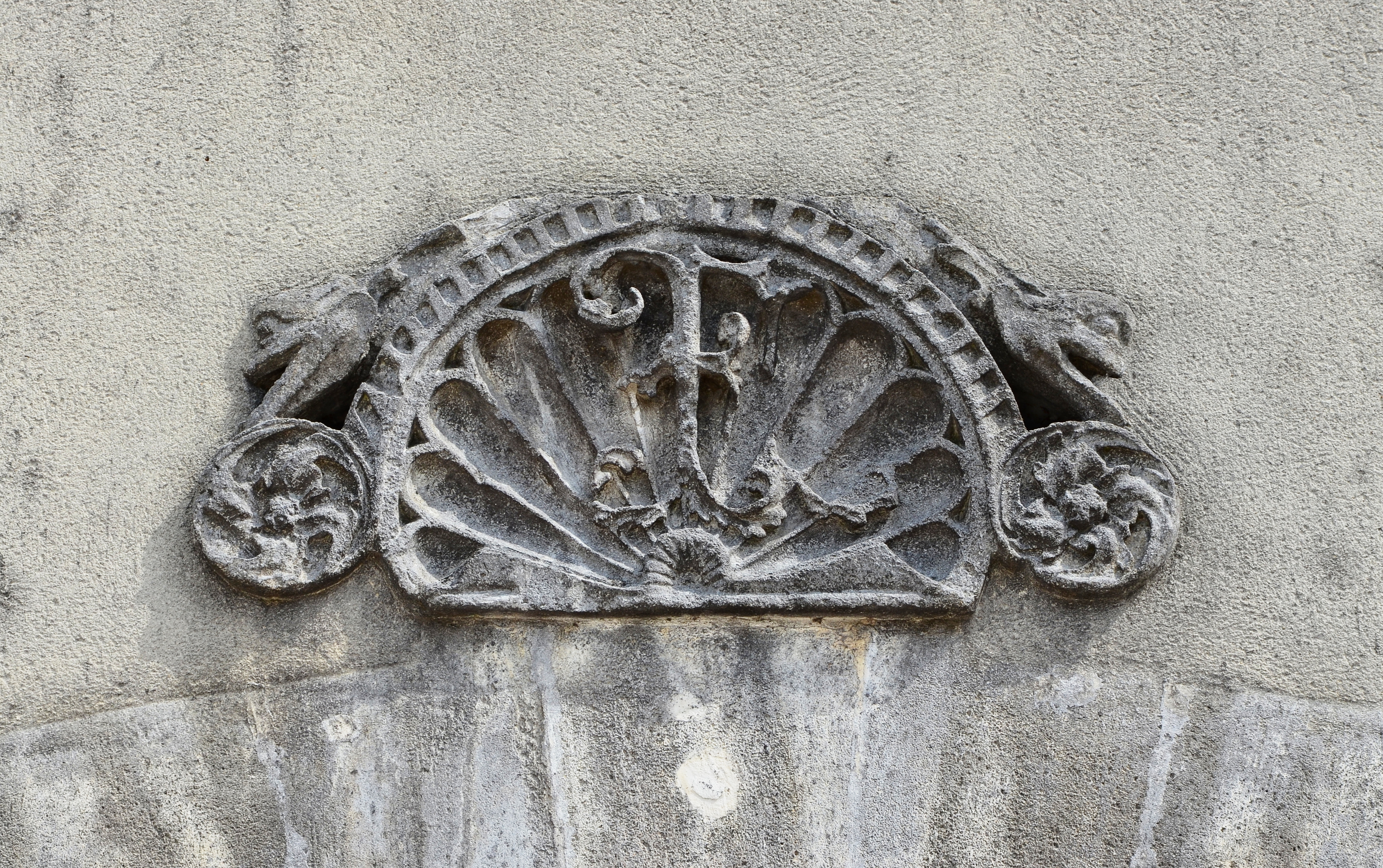
Renaissance monogram of Francis I of France on the Château de Cognac, Cognac, France, unknown sculptor or architect, 1517

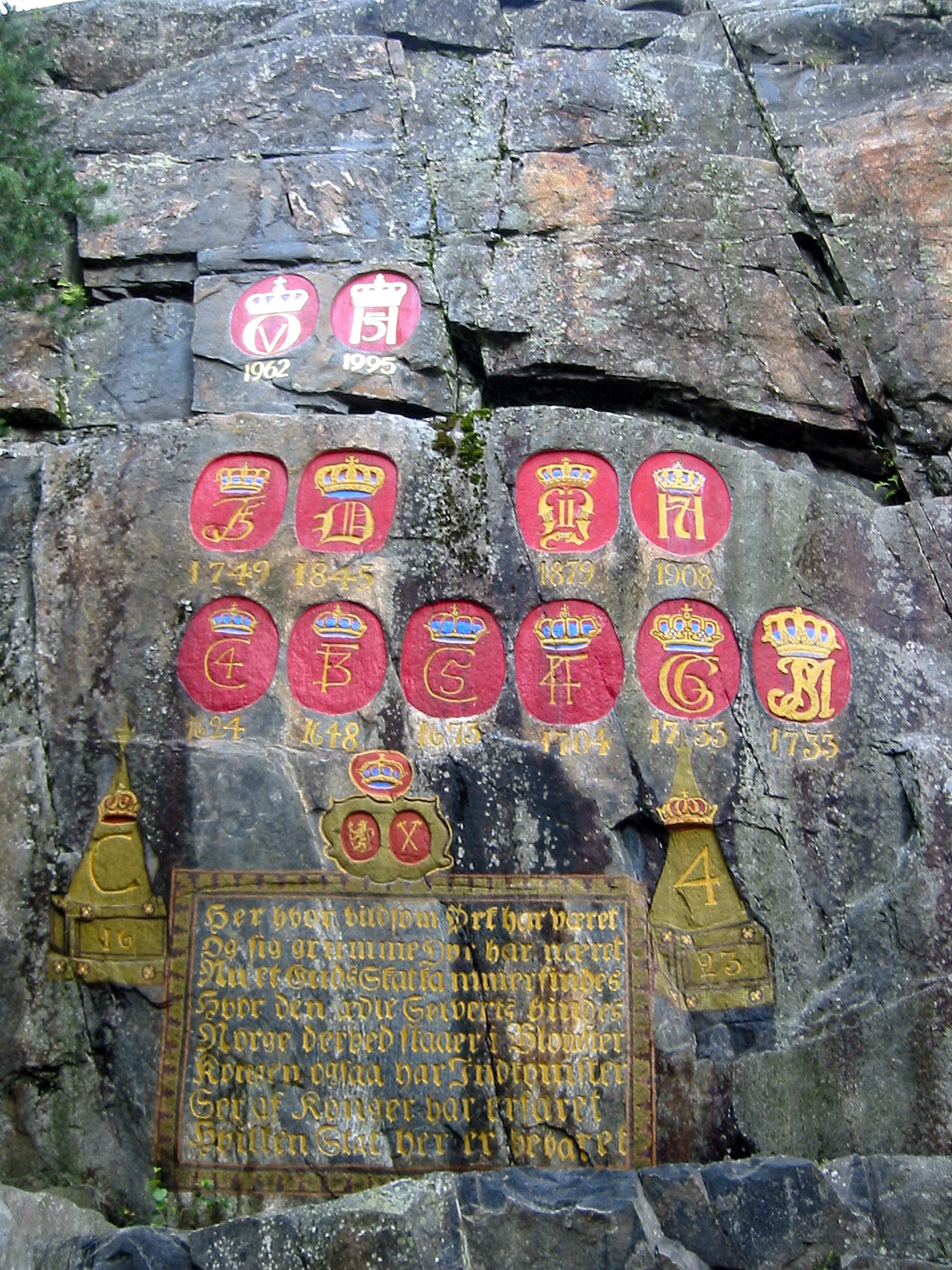
Norwegian royal monograms carved in a mountainside to mark royal visits to Kongsberg since 1623

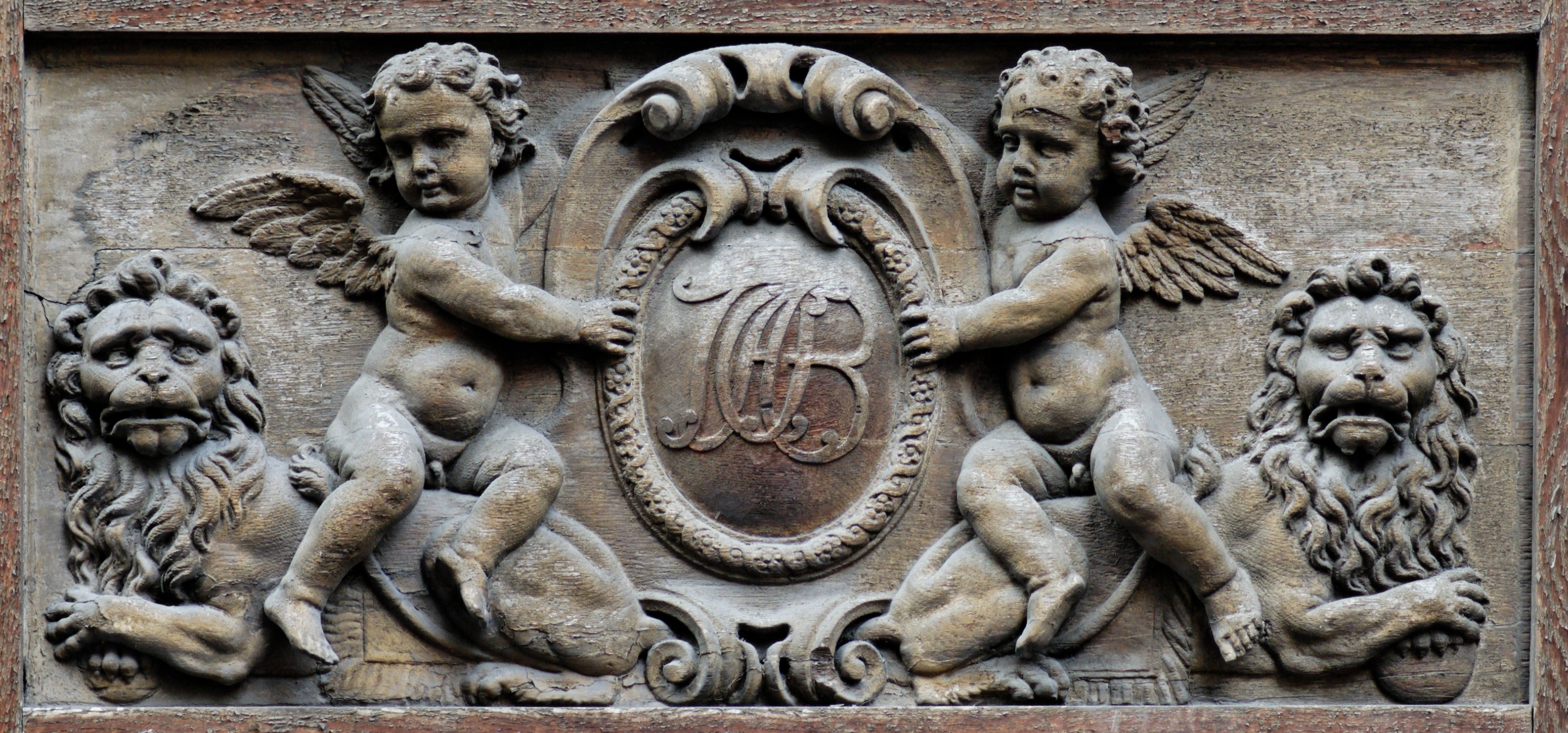
Baroque monogram on the door of the Hôtel Amelot de Bisseuil (Rue Vieille-du-Temple no. 47), Paris, designed by Pierre Cottard, 1657-1660

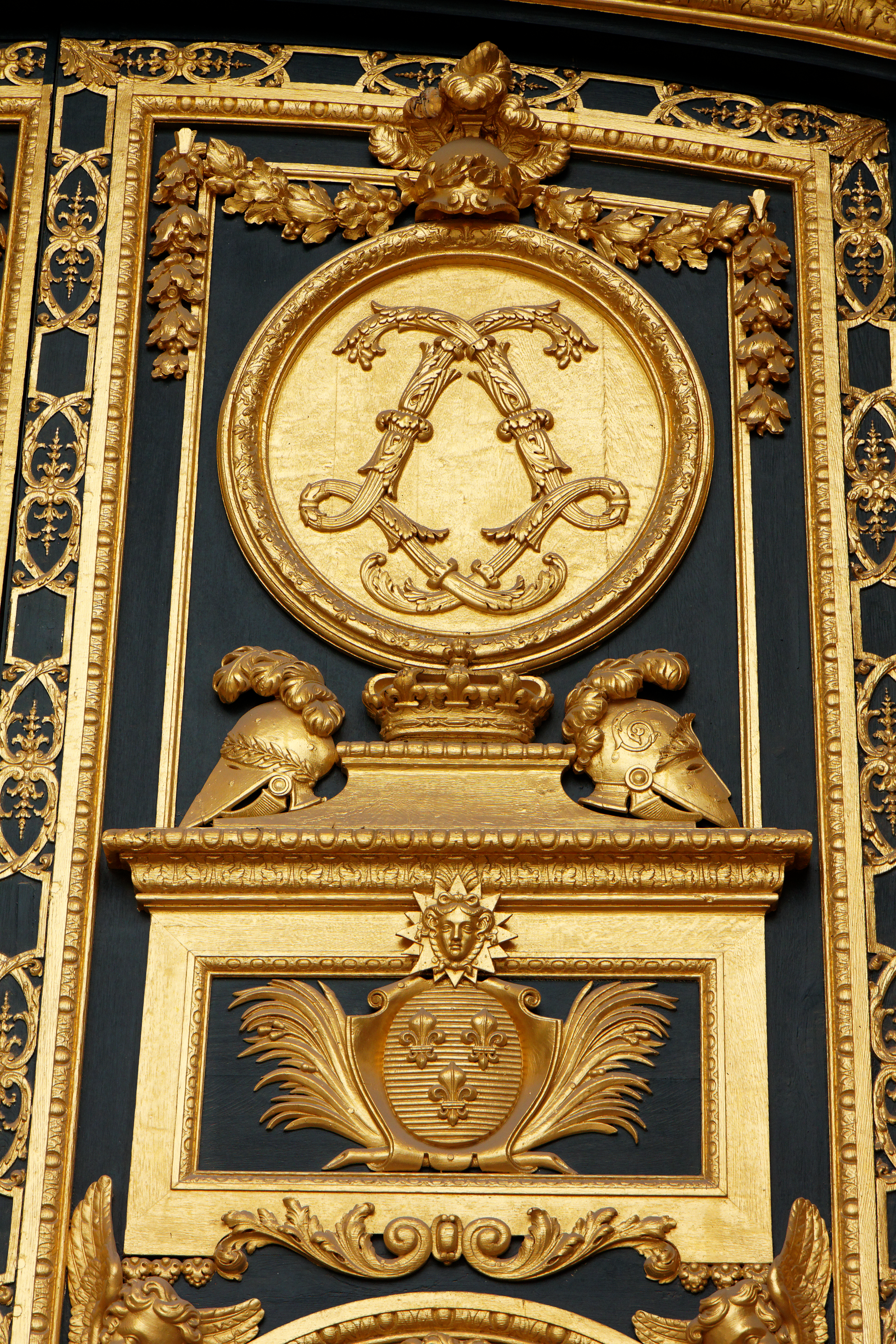
Baroque monogram of Louis XIV made of acanthuses, on the entrance door of the Dôme des Invalides, Paris, designed by Jules Hardouin-Mansart, 1677–1706

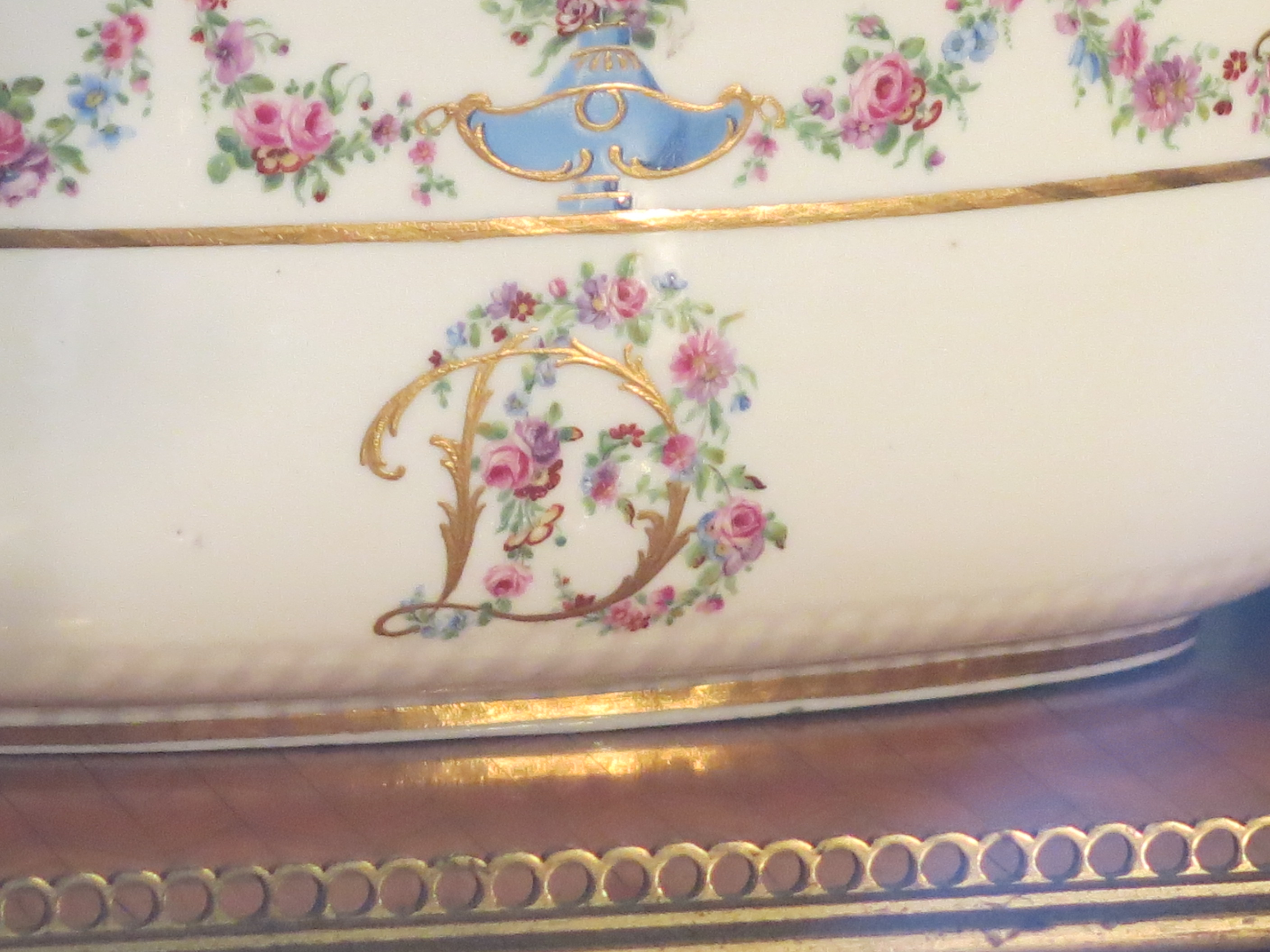
Rococo monogram on the punch bowl "with small vases and garlands" of Madame du Barry, by the Sèvres Porcelain Manufactory, 1771, painted and gilded porcelain, Louvre

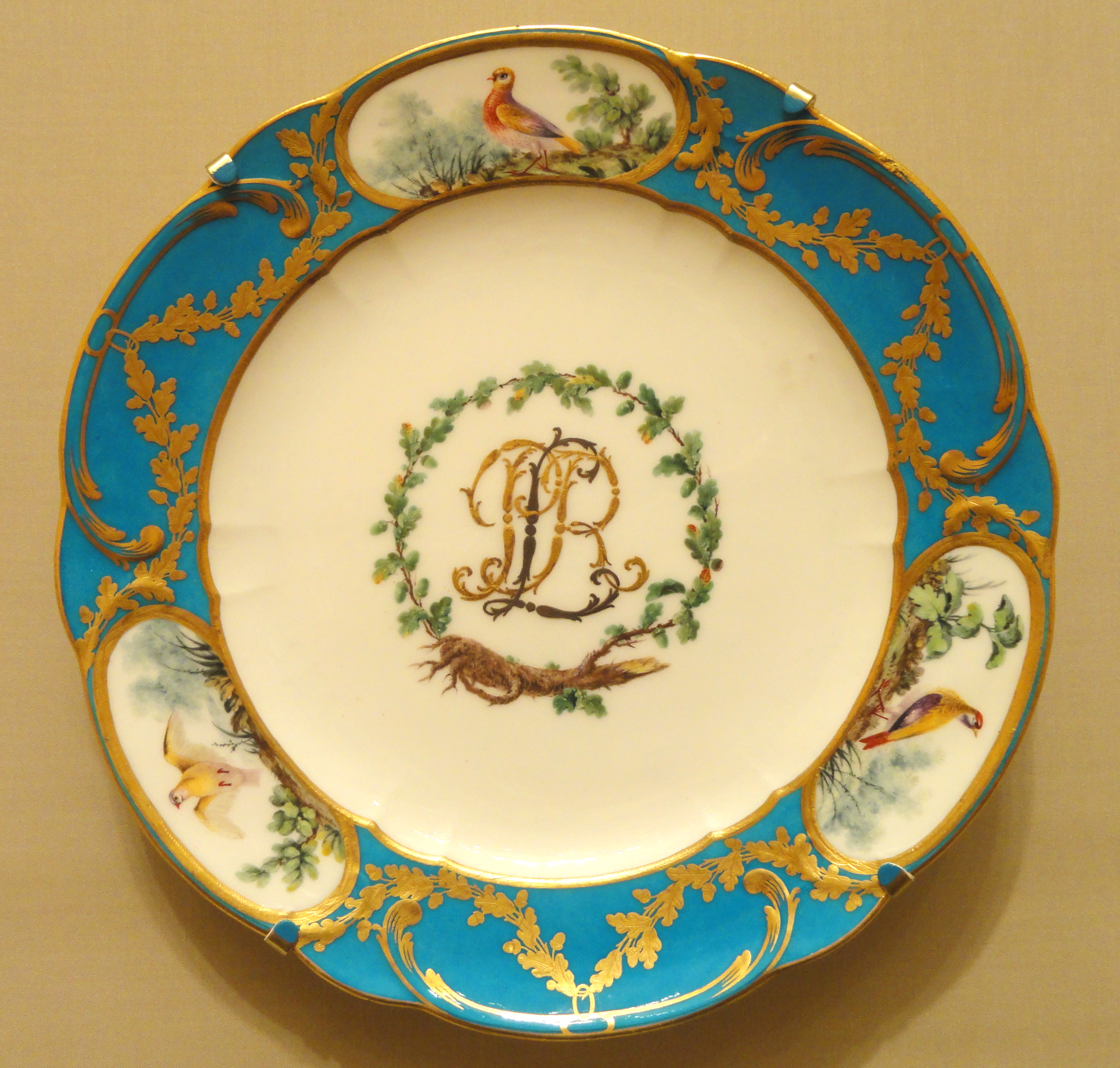
Rococo monogram on a plate from a service of Cardinal Prince Louis de Rohan, by the Sèvres Porcelain Manufactory, 1771-1772, painted and gilded porcelain, Nelson-Atkins Museum of Art, Kansas City, Texas, US

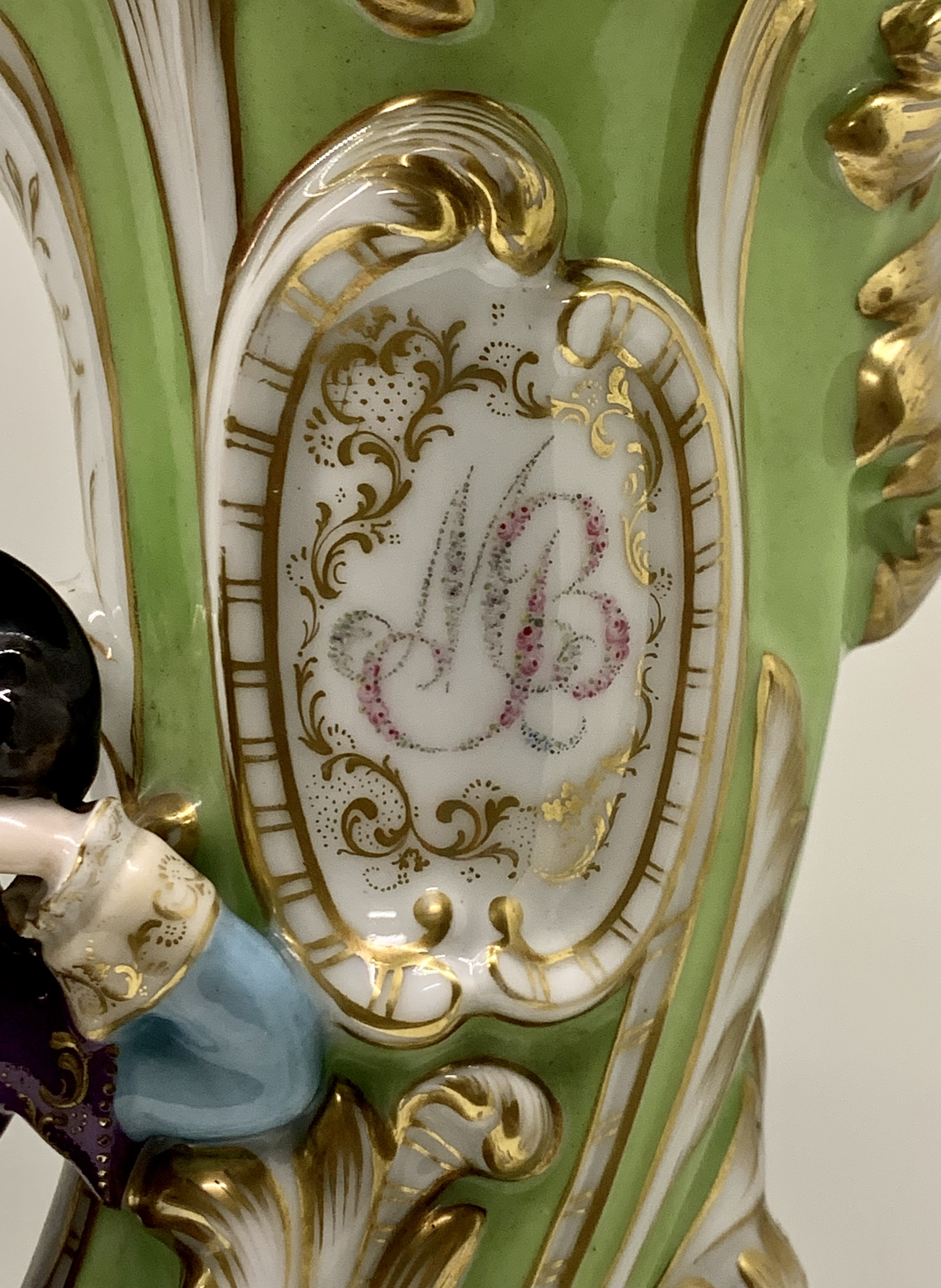
Rococo Revival monogram on a cone-shaped vase, part of a pair, possibly by Nicolas Bugeard, mid-19th century, hard-paste porcelain, painted and gilded, Museum of Decorative Arts, Paris

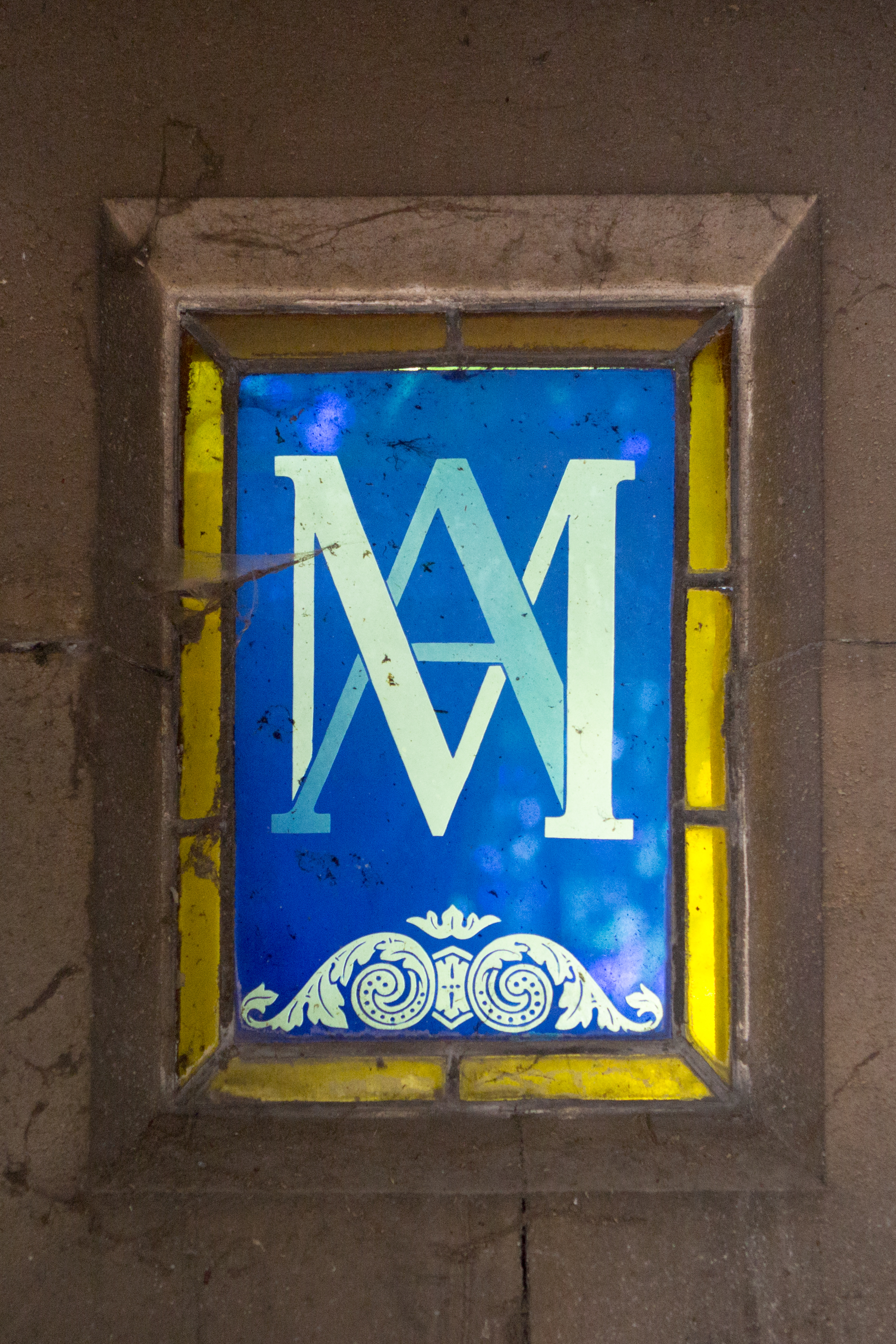
Neoclassical monogram of the Grave of the Miton family in the Père-Lachaise Cemetery, Paris, unknown architect or painter, c.1870

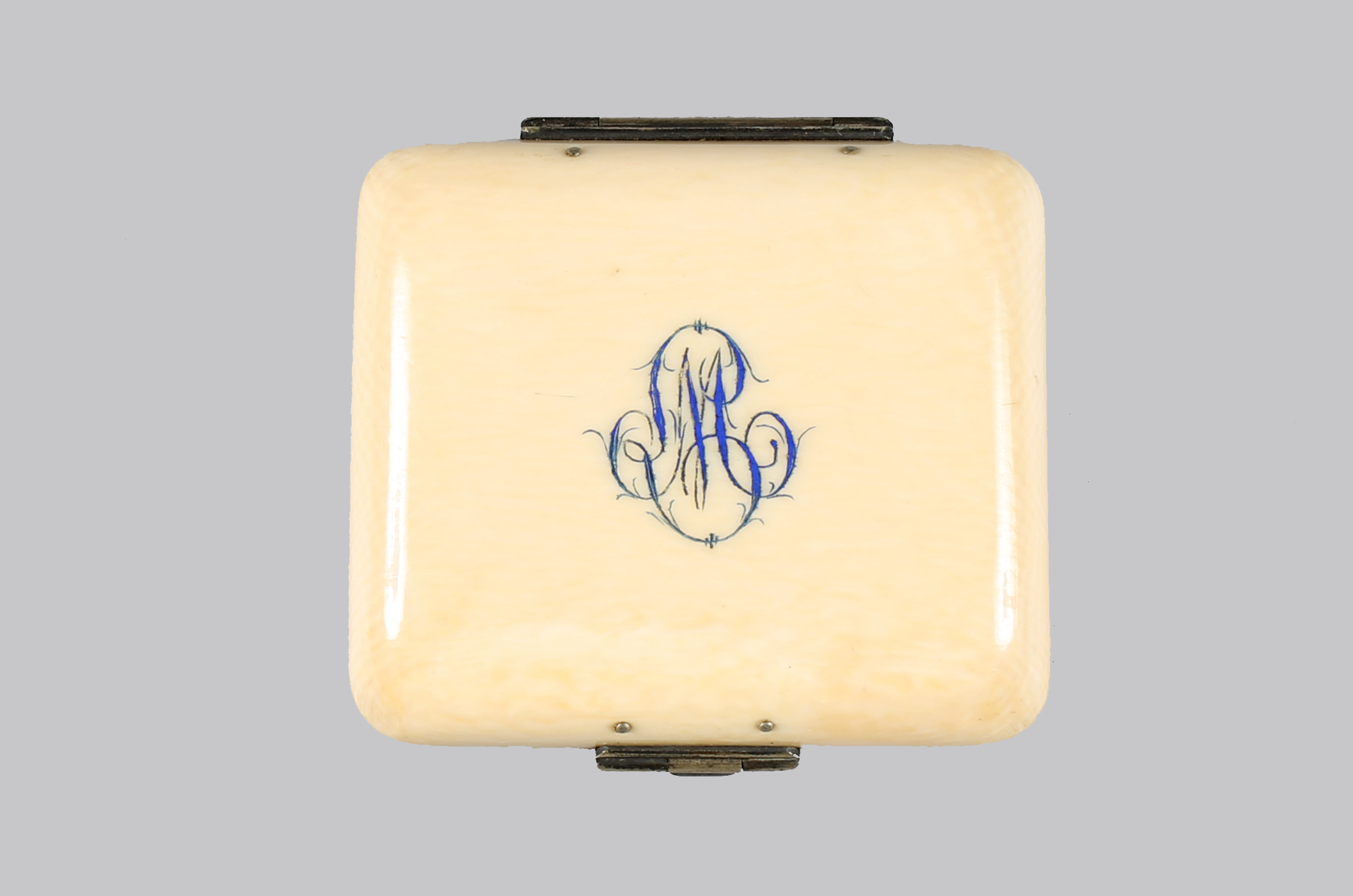
Rococo Revival monogram on a box, c.1880, ivory, metal and satin, Musée Galliera, Paris

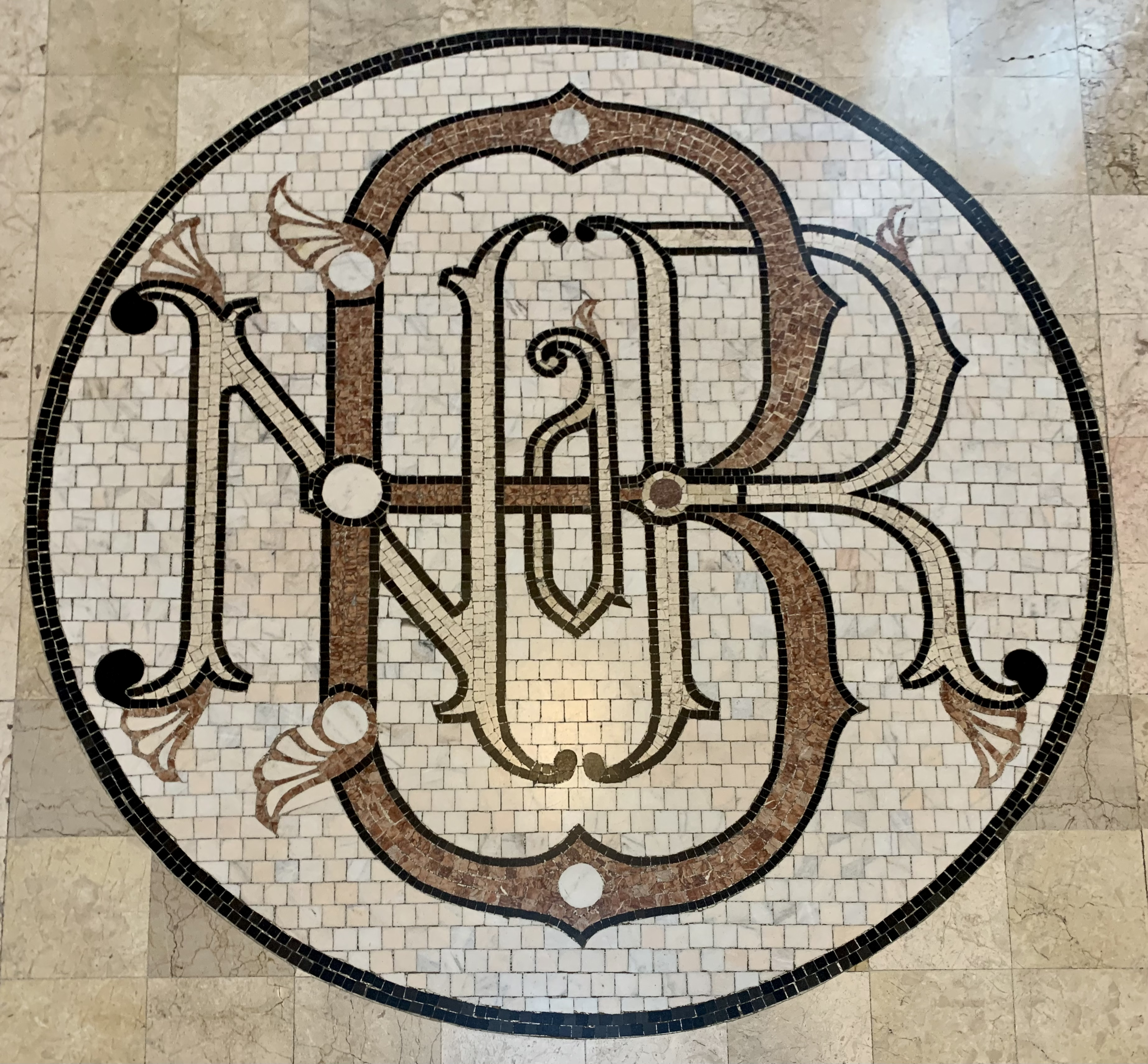
Beaux-Arts monogram of the National Bank of Romania in the BNR Building, Bucharest, Romania, designed by Paul Louis Albert Galeron, Grigore Cerchez or Constantin Băicoianu, 1883-1900

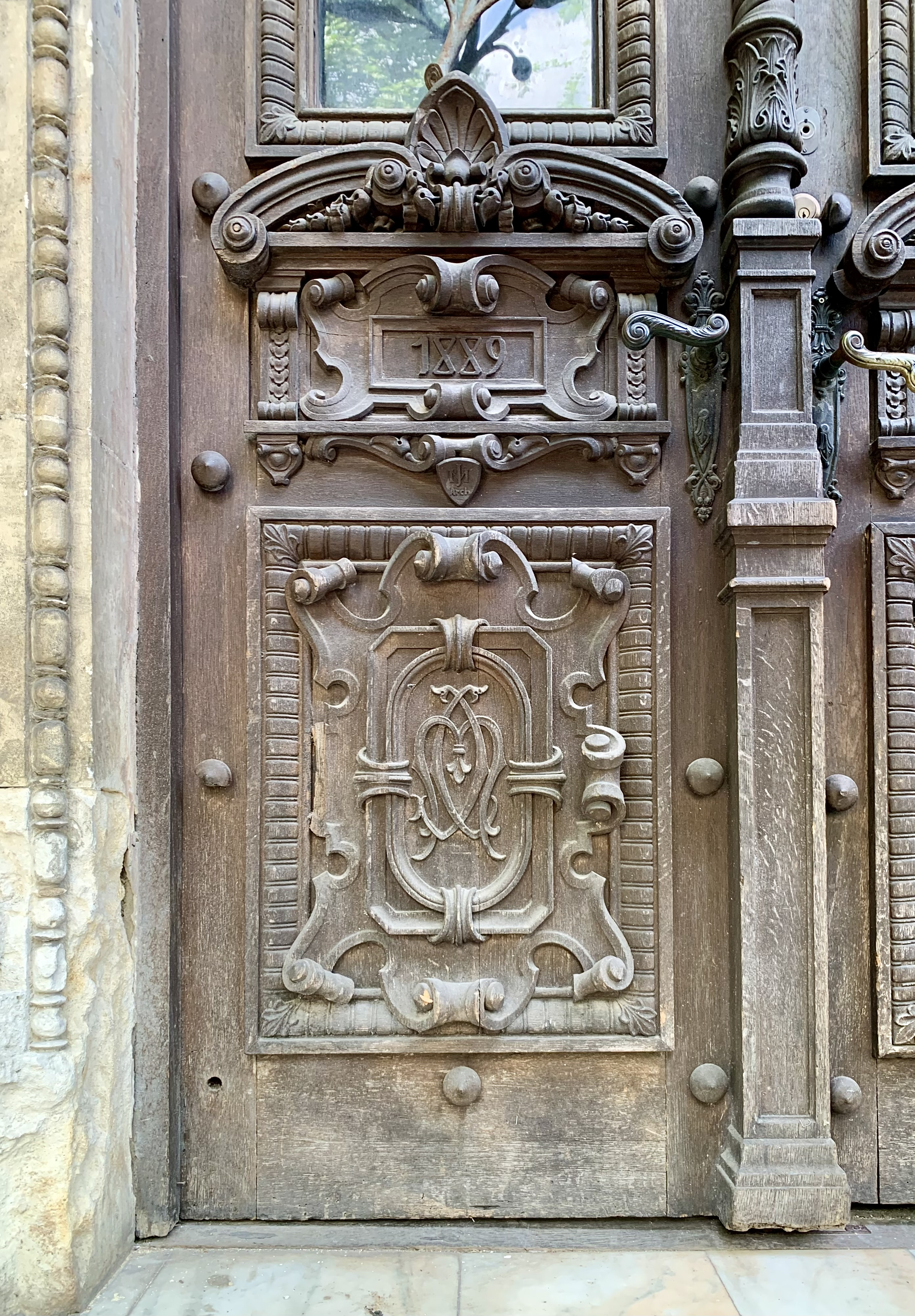
Romanesque Revival monogram on the entrance door of the Monteoru House, Bucharest, designed by Ion Mincu or Nicolae Cuțarida, 1887-1889

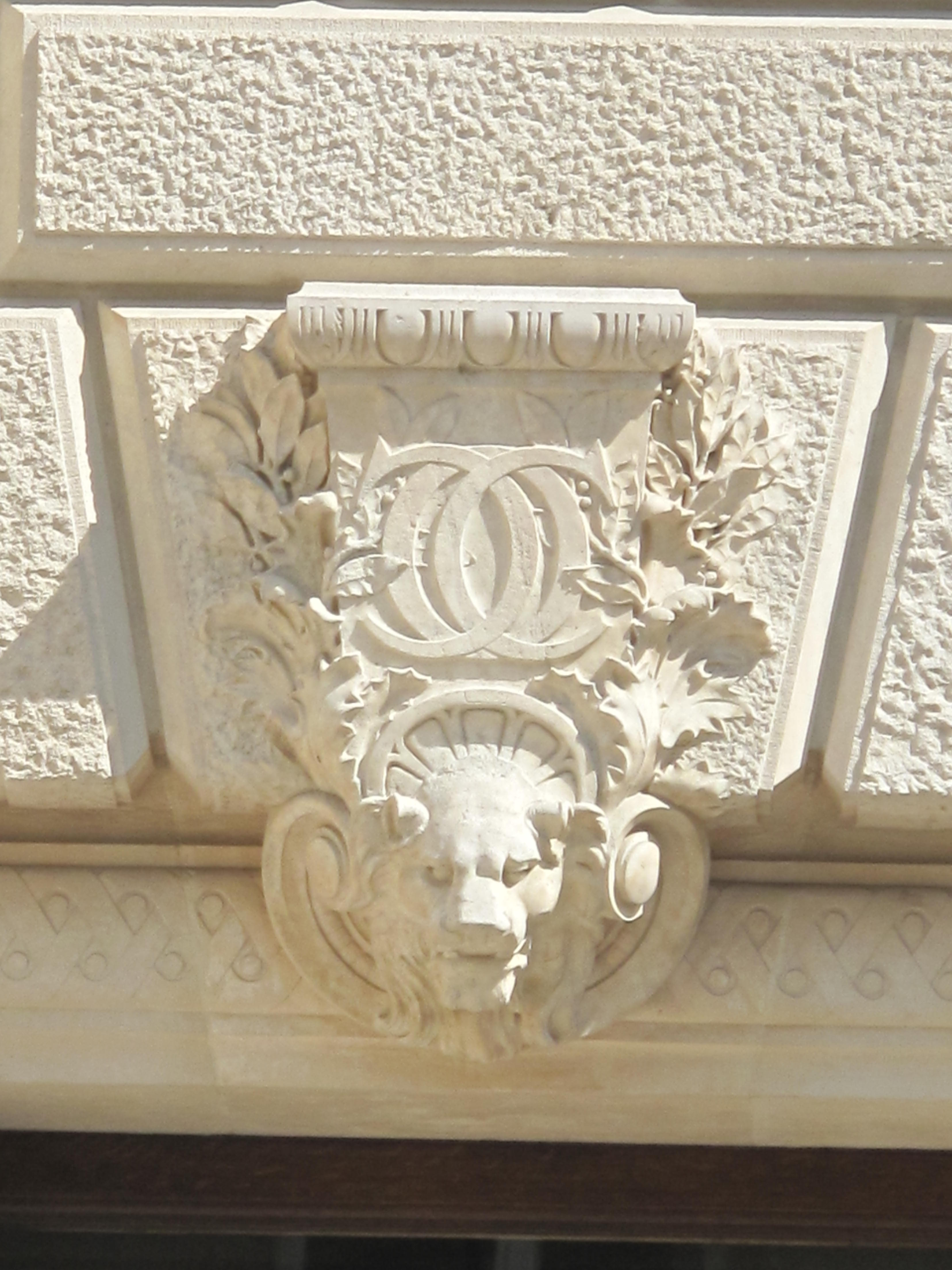
Beaux-Arts monogram on the Théâtre de l'Opéra-Comique, Paris, designed by Louis Bernier, 1893-1898

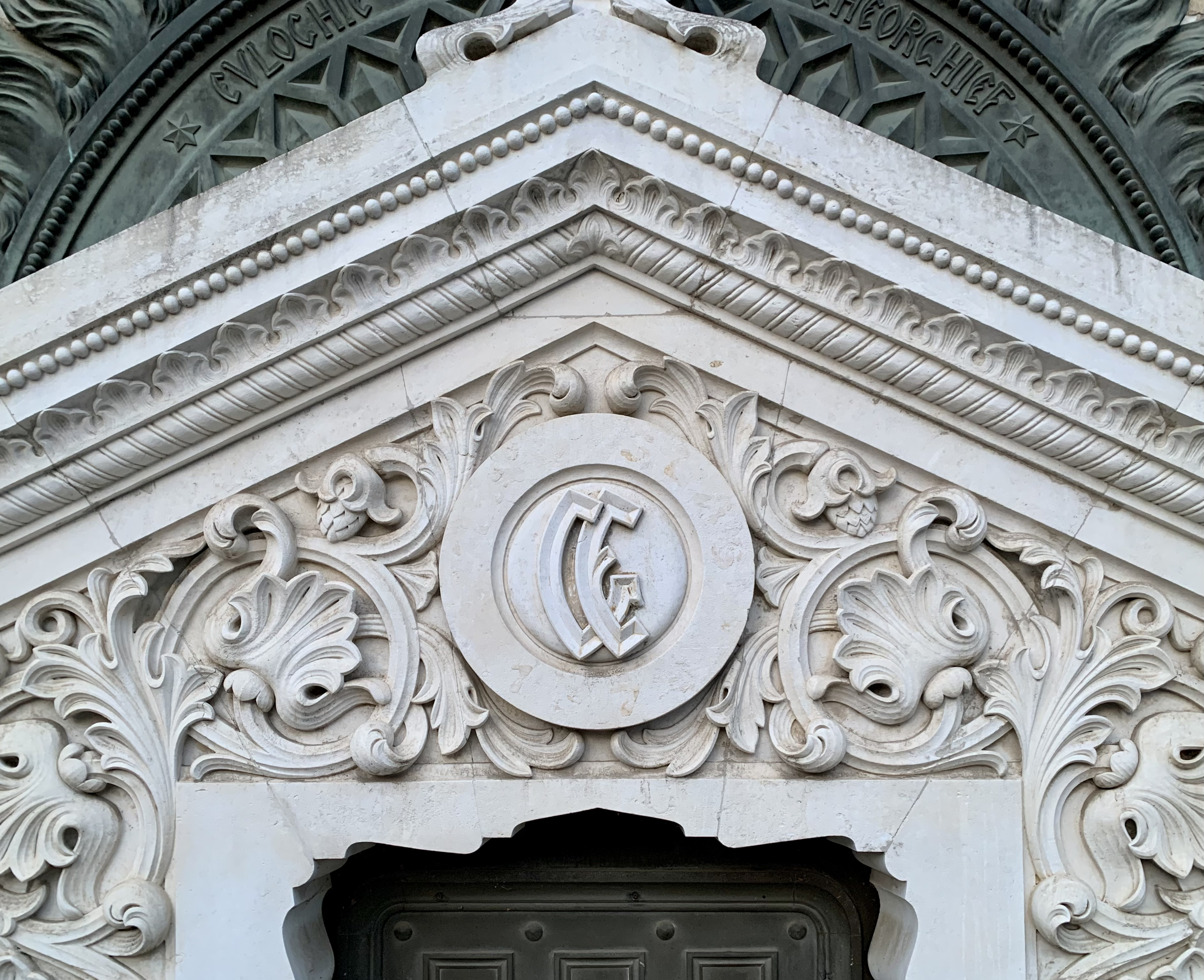
Romanian Revival monogram on the Grave of Georgiev Brothers, Bellu Cemetery, Bucharest, by Ion Mincu, c.1900

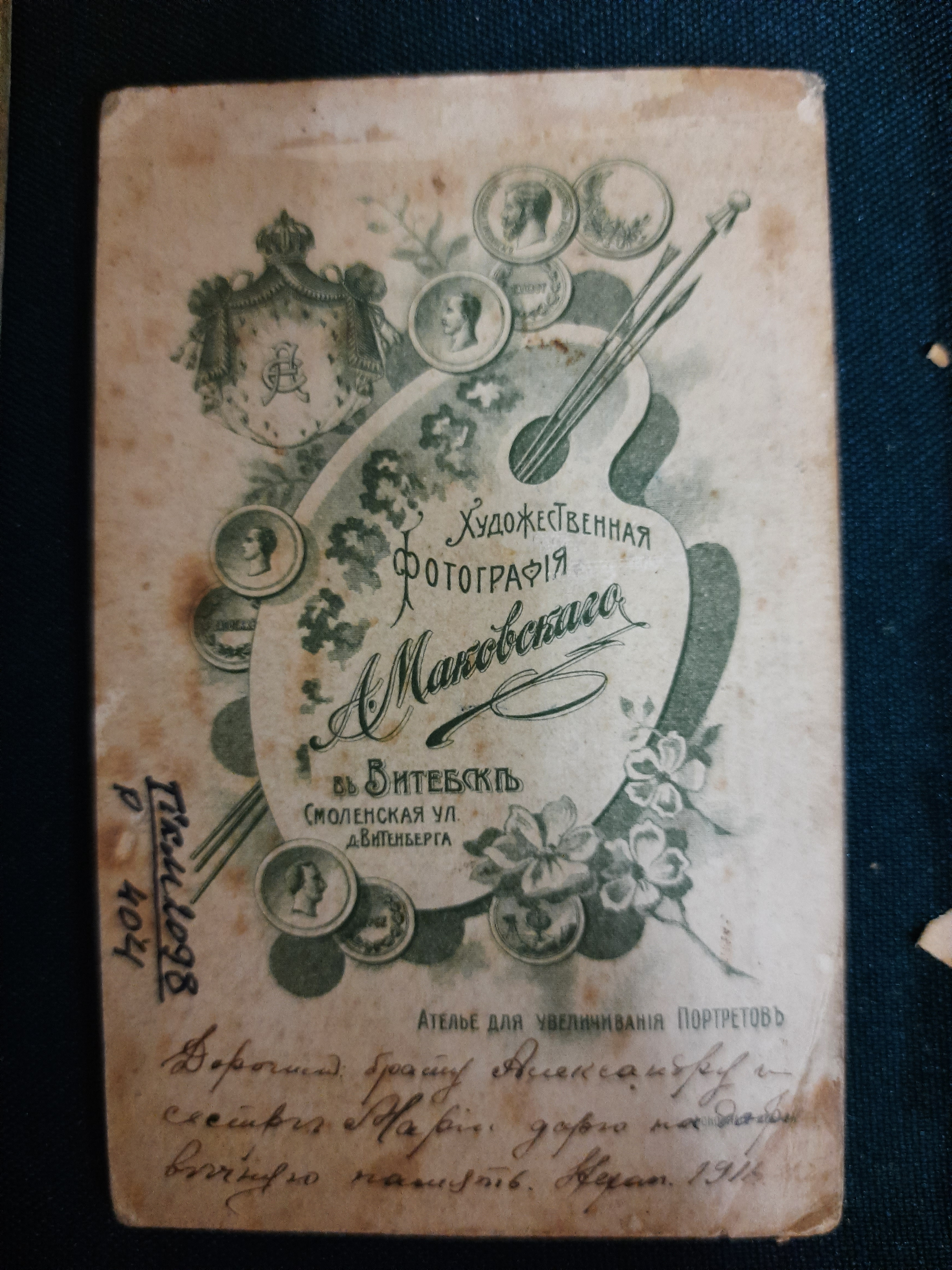
Art Nouveau monogram, part of the illustration that is on the back of a photo, illustration created around 1900, ink on cardboard, Troitske Local History Museum, Troitske, Ukraine

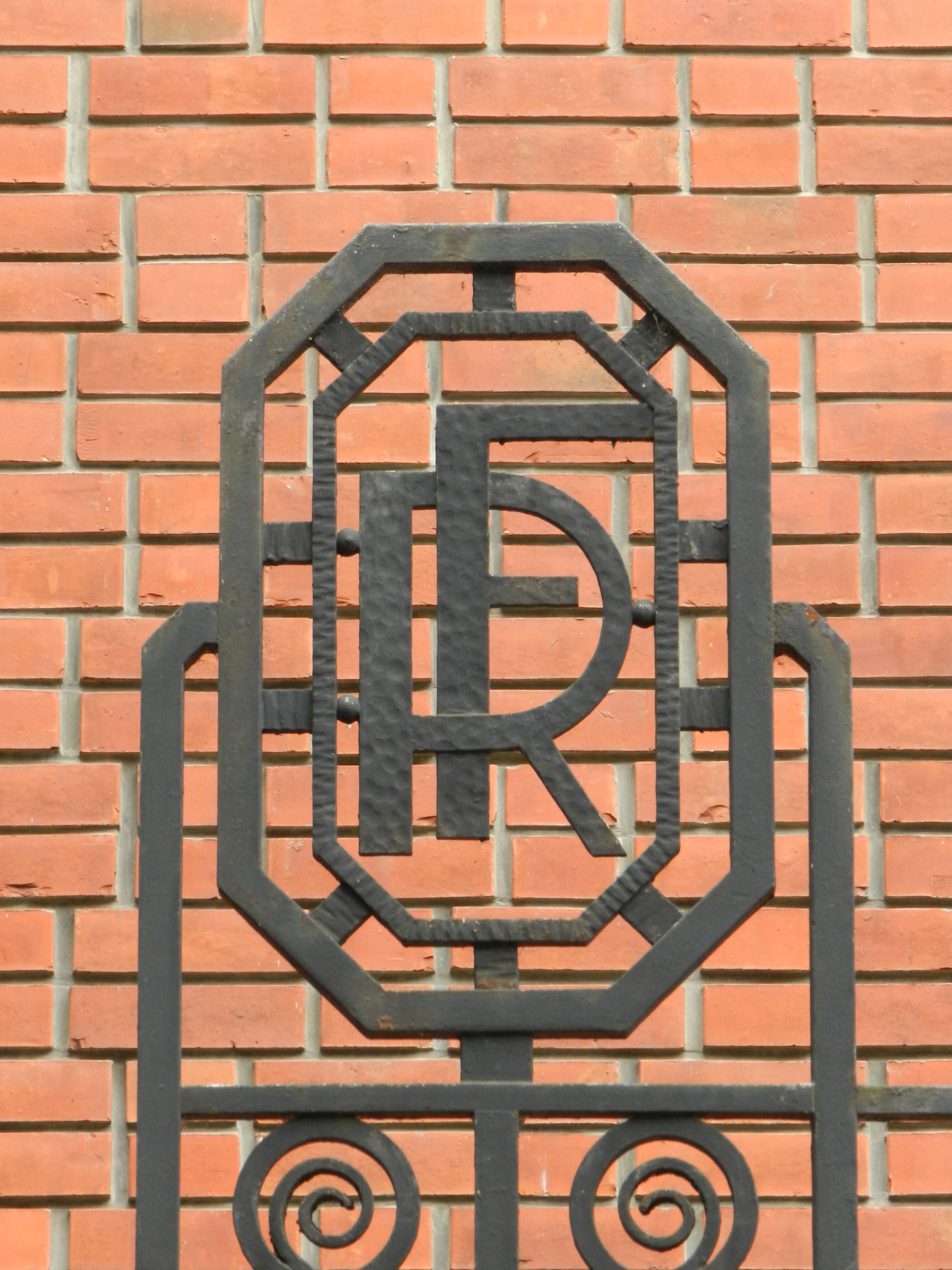
Art Deco monogram of the ESPCI Paris (Rue Vauquelin no. 10), Paris, unknown architect of blacksmith, c.1925

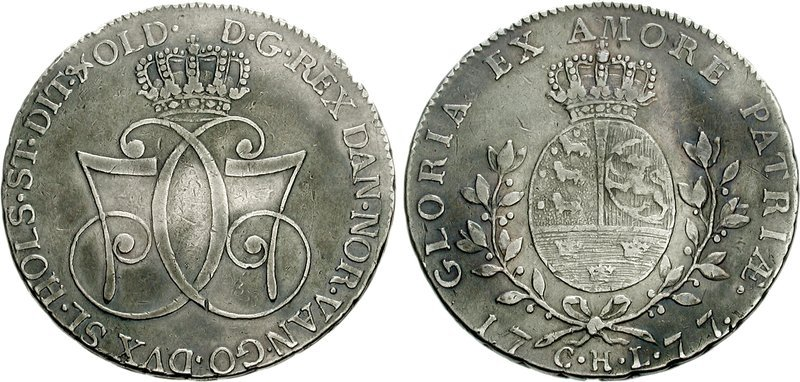
Speciedaler of Denmark, bearing the double C7 monogram of Christian VII

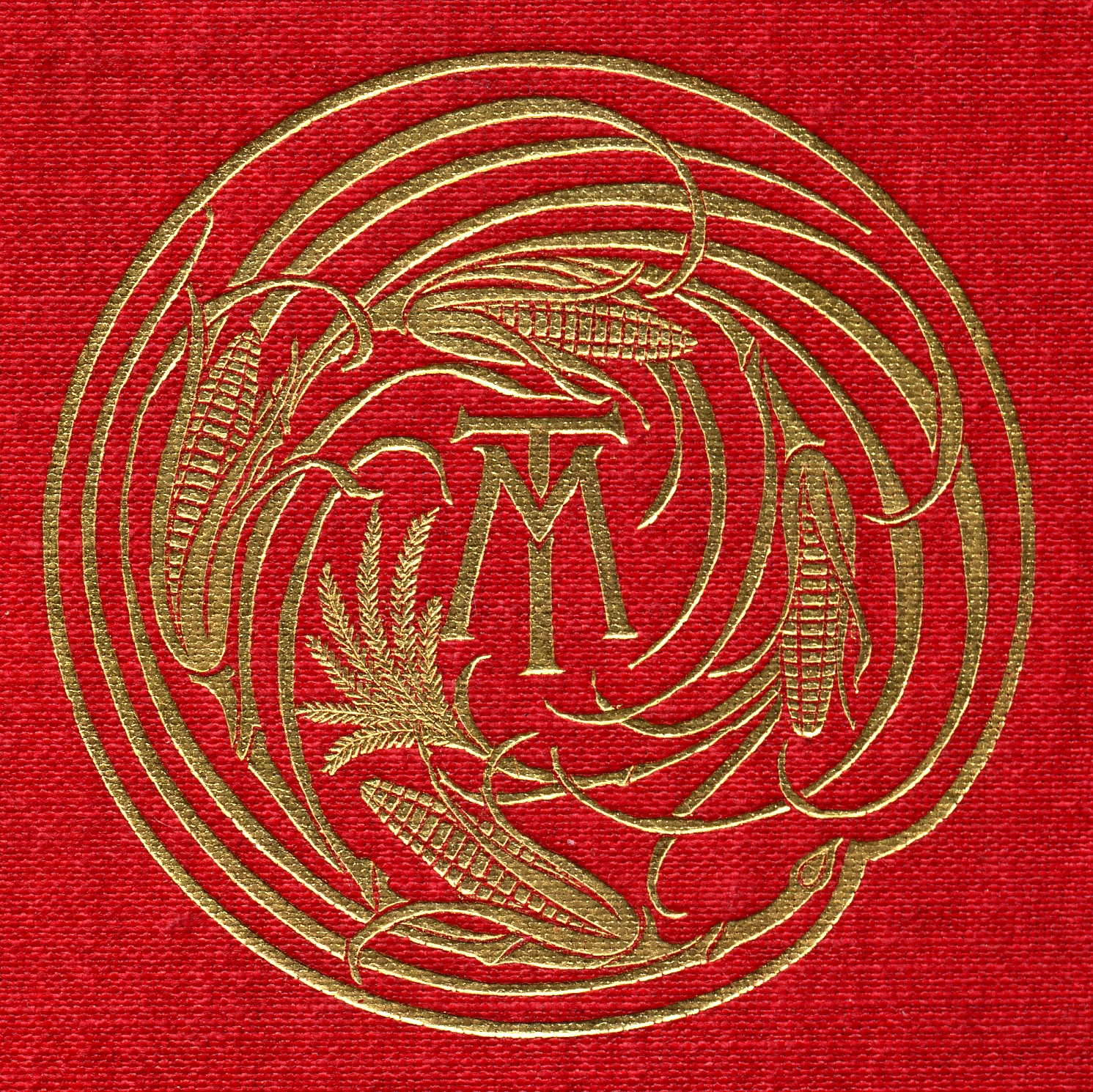
Logo on cover of 1896 edition of The American Claimant by Mark Twain

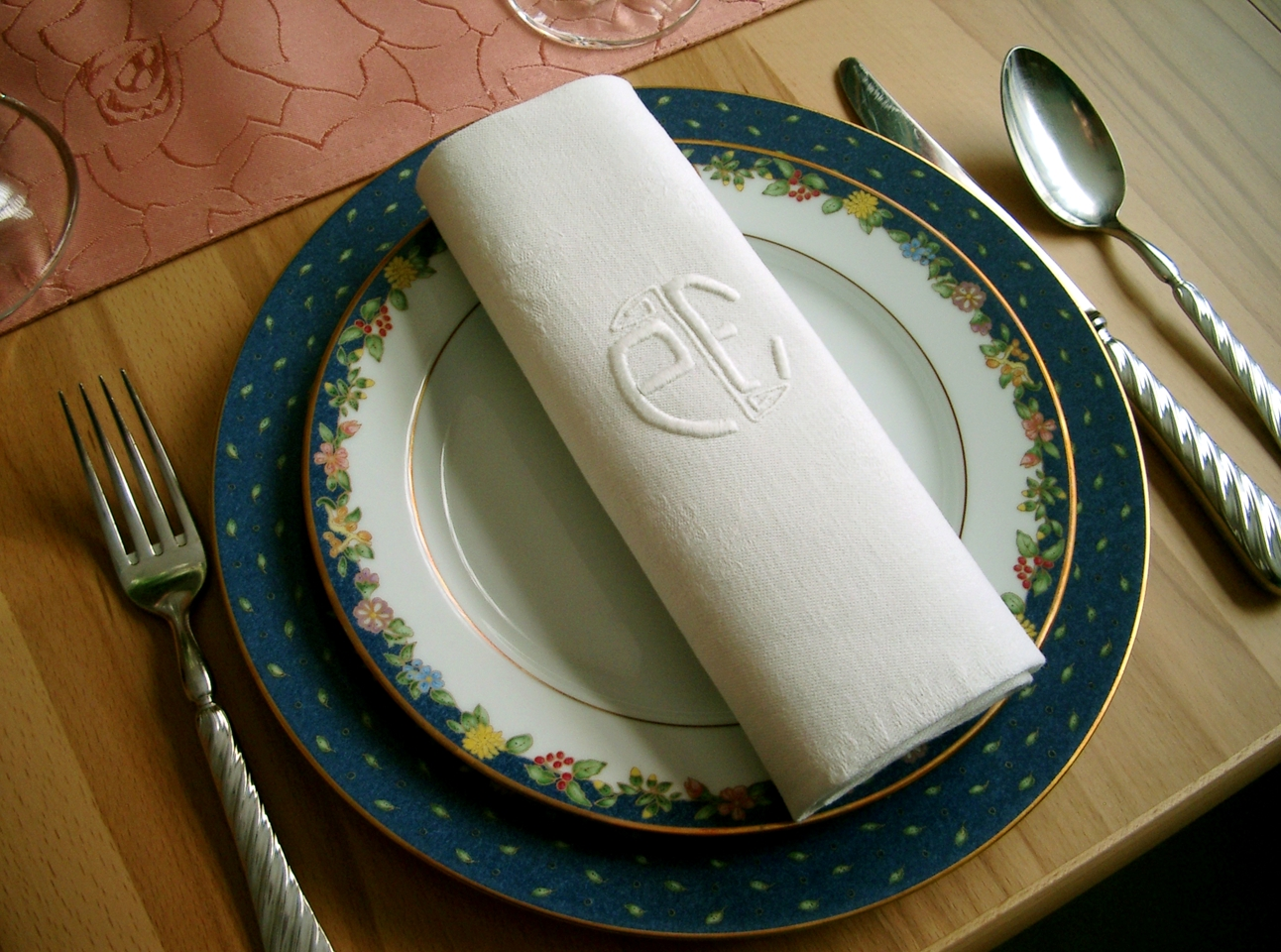
Napkin with embroidered monogram

Royal Monogram of Bulgarian king Boris III

Royal monogram of King Maha Vajiralongkorn of Thailand

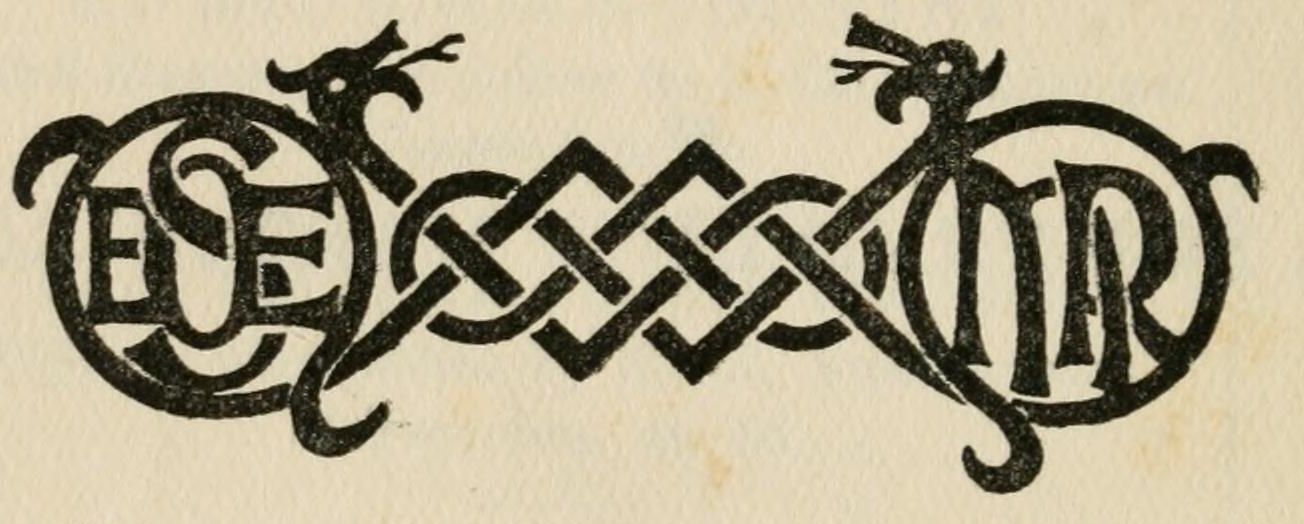
Paired monograms of the authors Edith Œnone Somerville and Martin Ross

Cypher of Margareta of Romania.

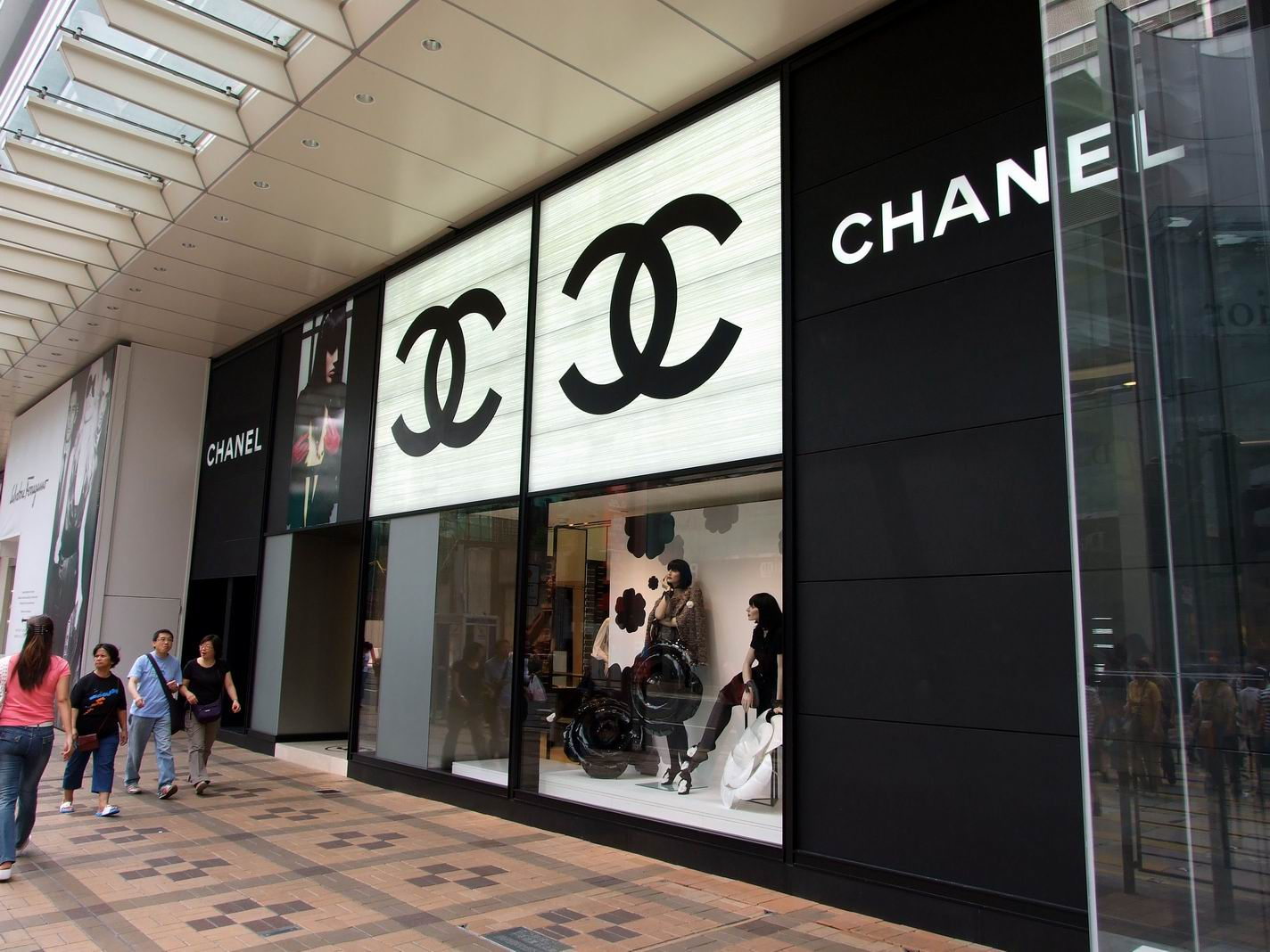
Chanel logo on store.

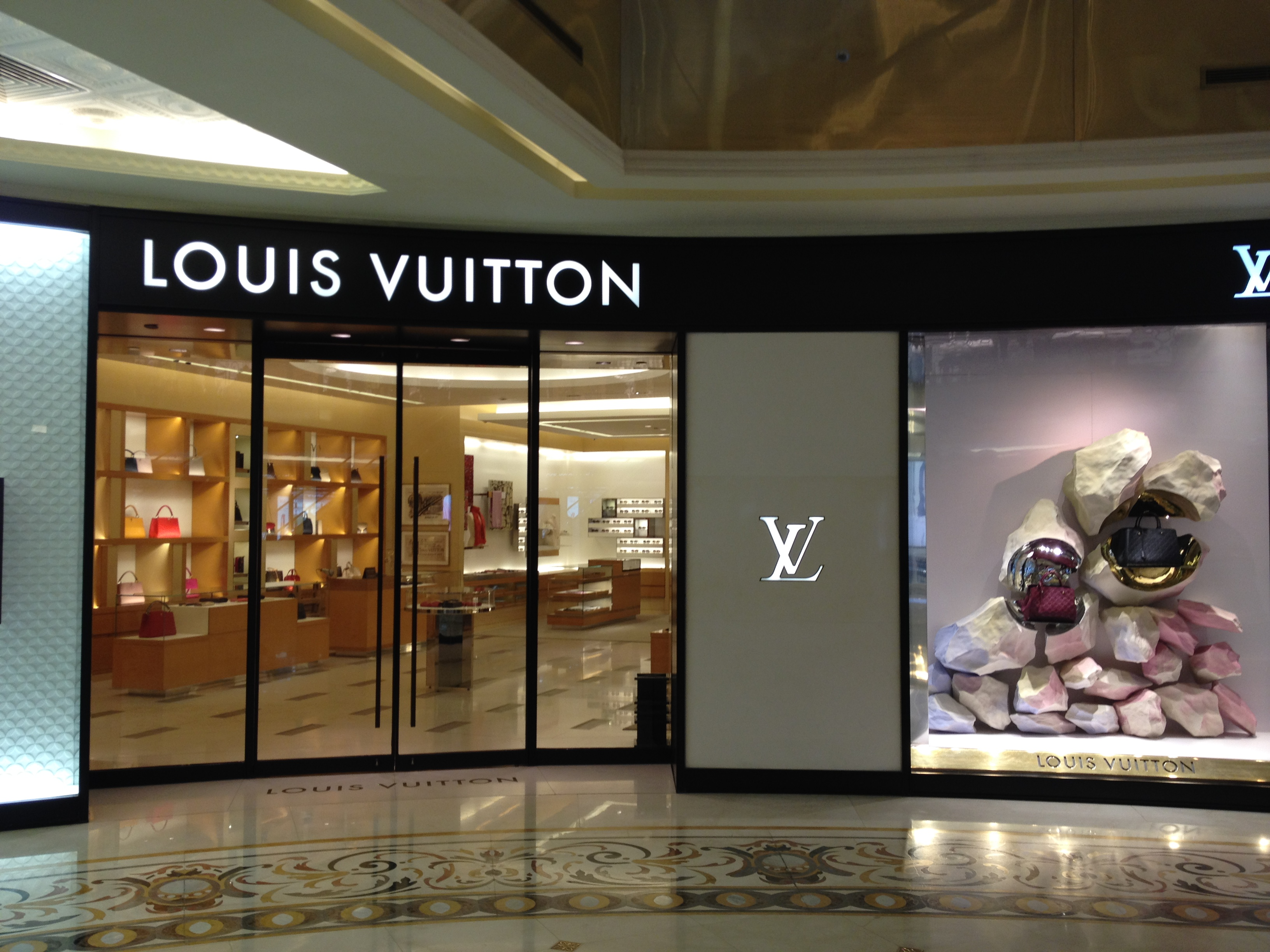
Louis Vuitton monogram on store.

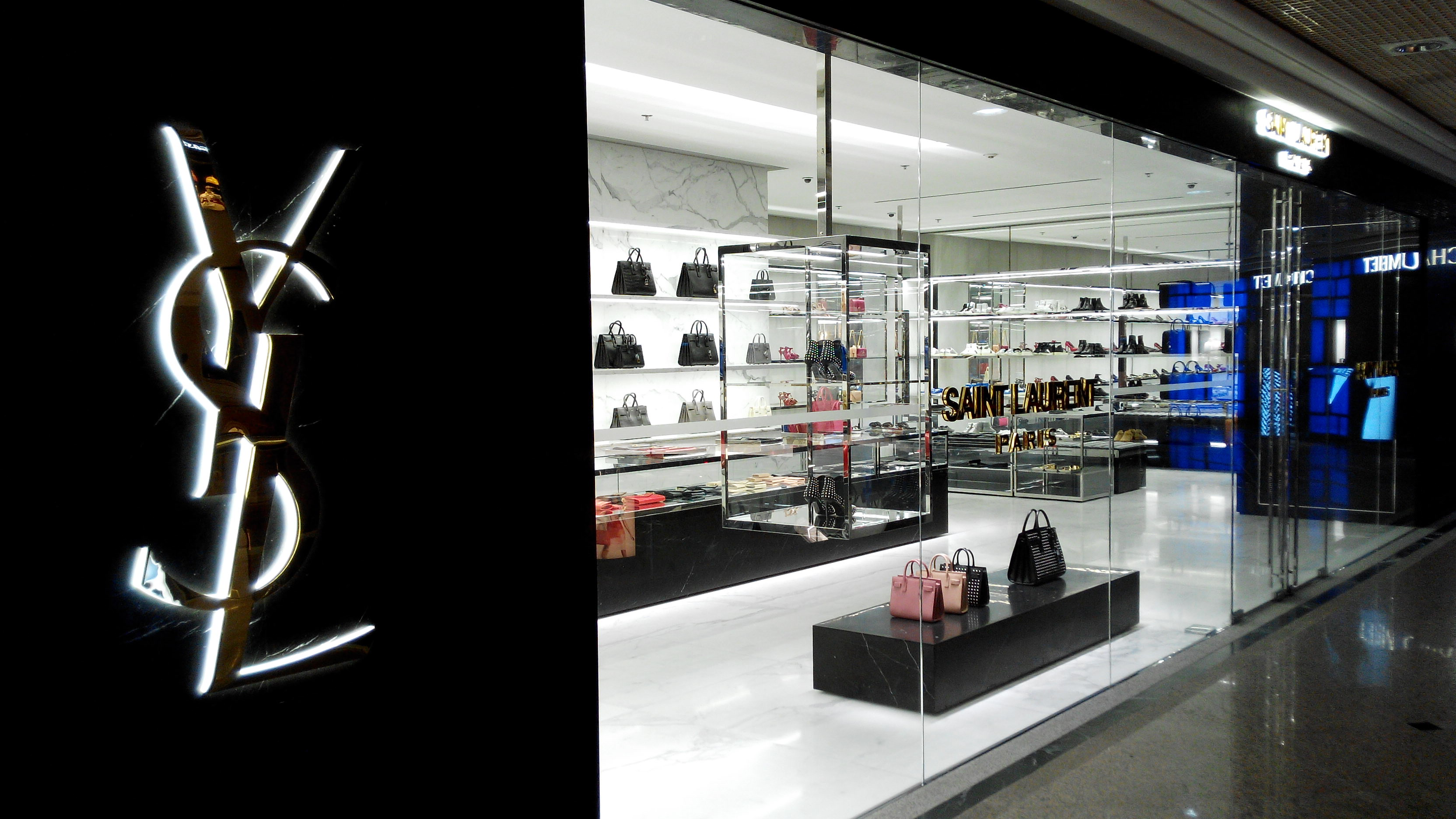
Yves Saint Laurent's logo

House flag of the Pickands Mather Company.

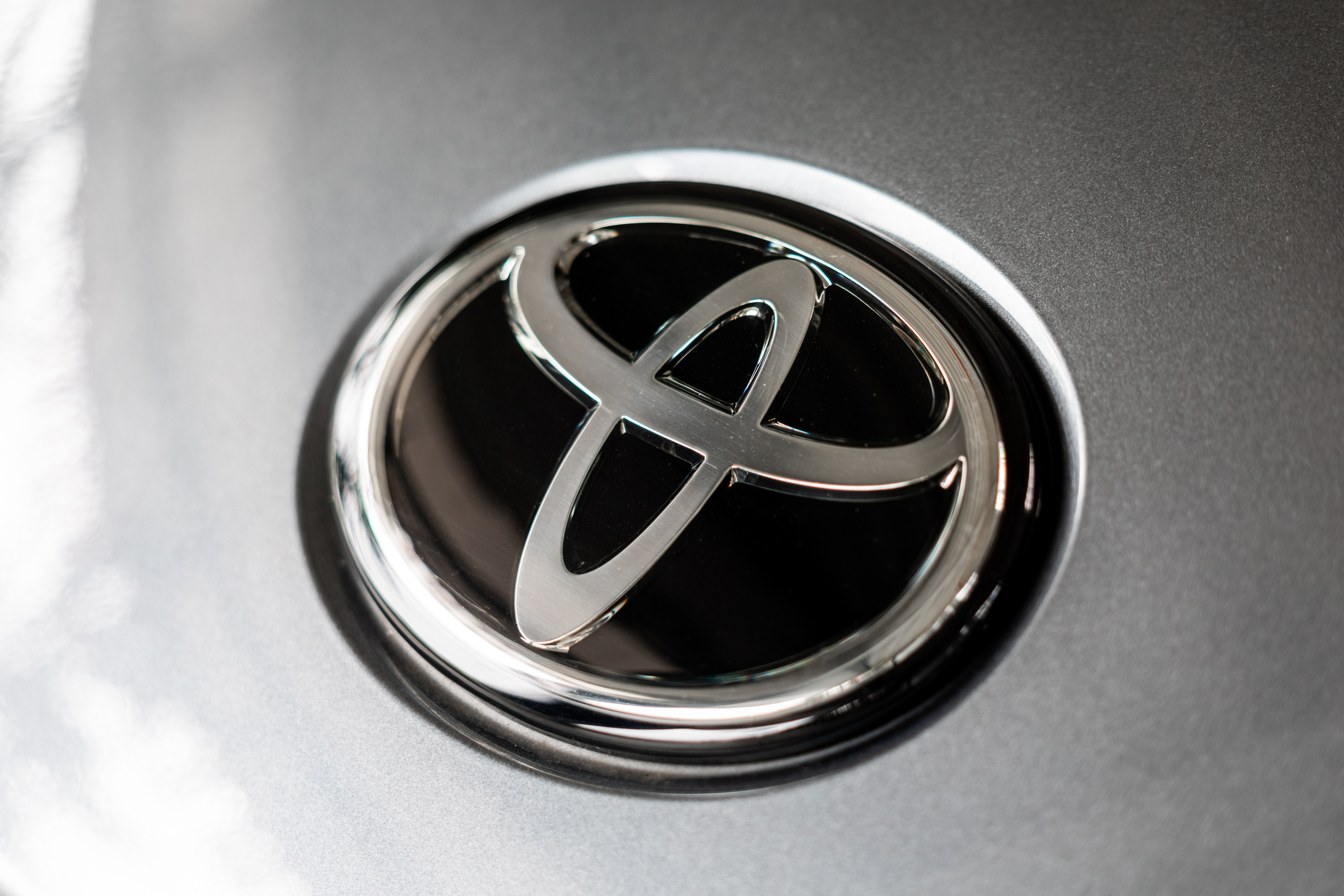
Toyota logo containing all letters of the name in the Latin alphabet.

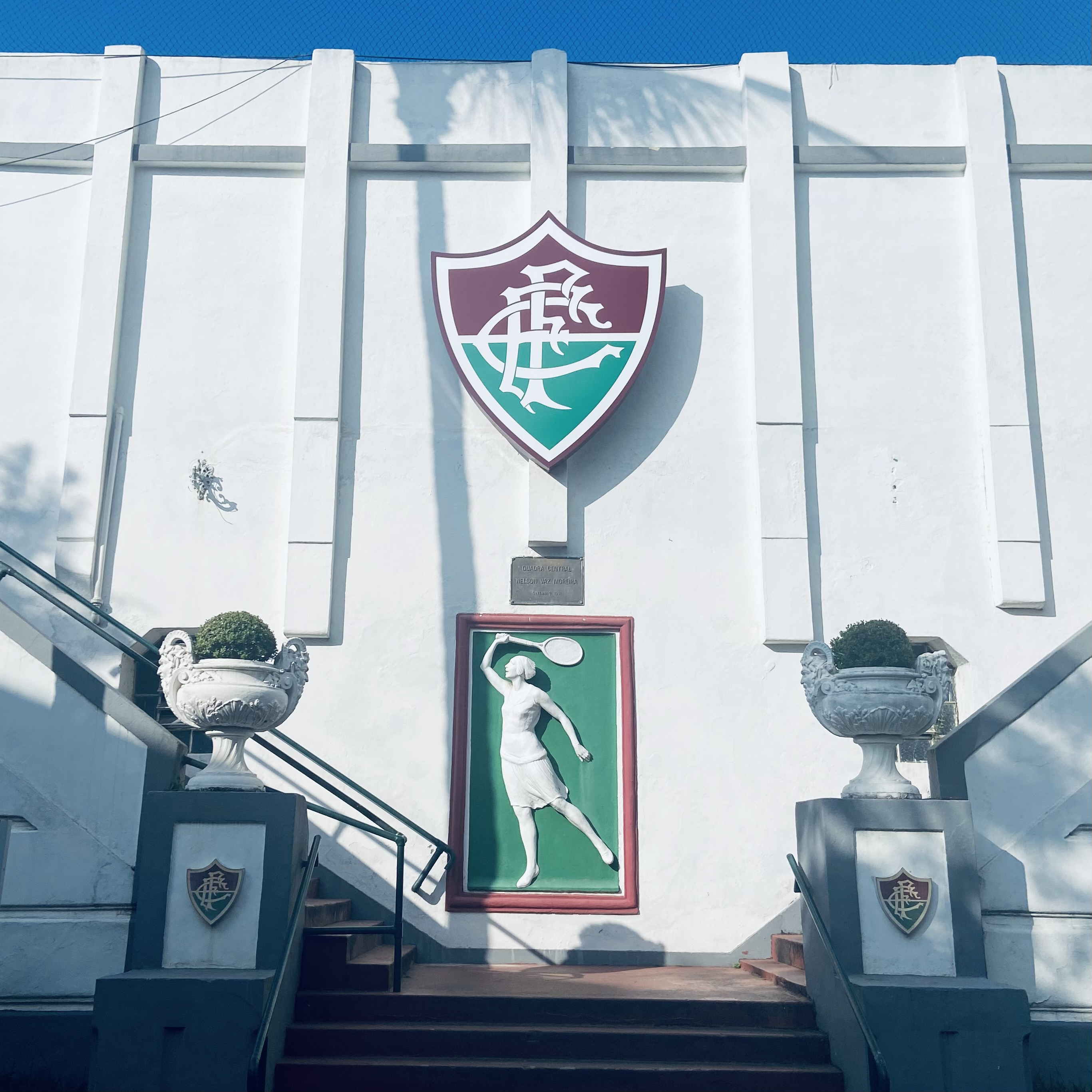
A monogram is part of Fluminense Football Club crest

== See also ==
- Bind rune
- Huaya
- Interrobang
- Ligature
- Nicolas Verrien, 17th-century French monogram designer
- One-letter word
- Royal cypher, often in the form of a monogram
- Sigil (magic)
- Siglum
- Signum manus
- Tughra
- Varsity letter
- Wordmark
