= Badel 1862 =

Croatian alcoholic beverage company

Badel 1862 d.d.
- Company type: Public limited company
- Traded as: ZSE: BD62
- Industry: Beverages
- Predecessors: Pokorny; Patria; Arko; Marijan Badel; Badel-Vinoprodukt
- Founded: 1862, Zagreb
- Headquarters: Zagreb, Croatia
- Key people: Darko Knez (General director)
- Products: Spirits, wine, soft drinks
- Revenue: HRK 431.453 million (2011)
- Operating income: HRK -43.167 million (2011)
- Net income: HRK -62.071 million (2011)
- Number of employees: 575 (2011)
- Website: badel1862.hr

Badel 1862 d.d. is a Croatian alcoholic beverage company headquartered in Zagreb.

Today's Badel originated following the Second World War, after the communist government nationalized the companies Pokorny, Patria, Arko, Marijan Badel, and Badel-Vinoprodukt. In March 2011, Badel took over Eurobev d.o.o., which produces fruit juices and soft drinks.

== Brands ==
Badel 1862 produces some of the regionally most recognizable alcoholic brands, including:

- Spirits: Pelinkovac, Vigor Vodka, Travarica, Stara Šljivovica, William's, Loza, Prima Brand (formerly Prima Brandy), Glembay Vinjak, Cezar Vinjak, Zrinski Vinjak, Sax Gin
- Wines: Graševina Daruvar, Postup, Dingač, Ivan Dolac, Korlat
- Soft drinks: Voćko, Inka, Nara

Badel 1862 is also the distribution company for major alcohol and soft drink brands, such as:

- Rum: Bacardi
- Tequila: Sierra Tequila
- Amaro: Amaro 18 Isolabella
- Gin: Bombay Sapphire
- Whisky: Dewar's
- Amaretto: Disaronno
- Cognac: Otard Cognac
- Vodka: Grey Goose
- Coffee liqueur: Tia Maria
- Vermouth: Martini
- Soft drinks: Pepsi Cola, 7 Up, Mirinda
