= Invej =

Serbian trading company headquartered in Belgrade

- Company type: Joint-stock company
- Industry: Wholesale
- Founded: 19 January 1993; 33 years ago
- Headquarters: Belgrade, Serbia
- Key people: Stanko Tomović (General director)
- Revenue: ▲€90.86 million (2018)
- Net income: ▲ (€25.87 million) (2018)
- Total assets: ▼€81.94 million (2018)
- Total equity: ▼€0 (2018)
- Owner: Predrag Ranković
- Number of employees: 1,157 (2018)
- Subsidiaries: Vital a.d. Sunce d.o.o. Novo Sunce d.o.o. Albus a.d. Aurora Pharm d.o.o. Milan Blagojević a.d. Ratar a.d. Ratar Corn d.o.o.
- Website: www.invej.rs

Invej is a Serbian trading company headquartered in Belgrade.

== Subdivisions ==
The company is the owner of: Happy TV (one of the leading commercial television stations in Serbia); Ratar (enterprise for the production of wheat products); Rubin a.d. (beverage industry); Milan Blagojević Smederevo (household appliances); Pekarska industrija (pastry industry); Vital (oil factory); Monus (cigarette factory); Medela (company for production of confectionery and food products); Sunce (oil factory); Kasina (hotel and club); Ideogram (DVD publishing company and synchronization); City Port (production and trade enterprise); and, Albus (home chemistry).
