= Vinjak =

Brand of brandy from Serbia

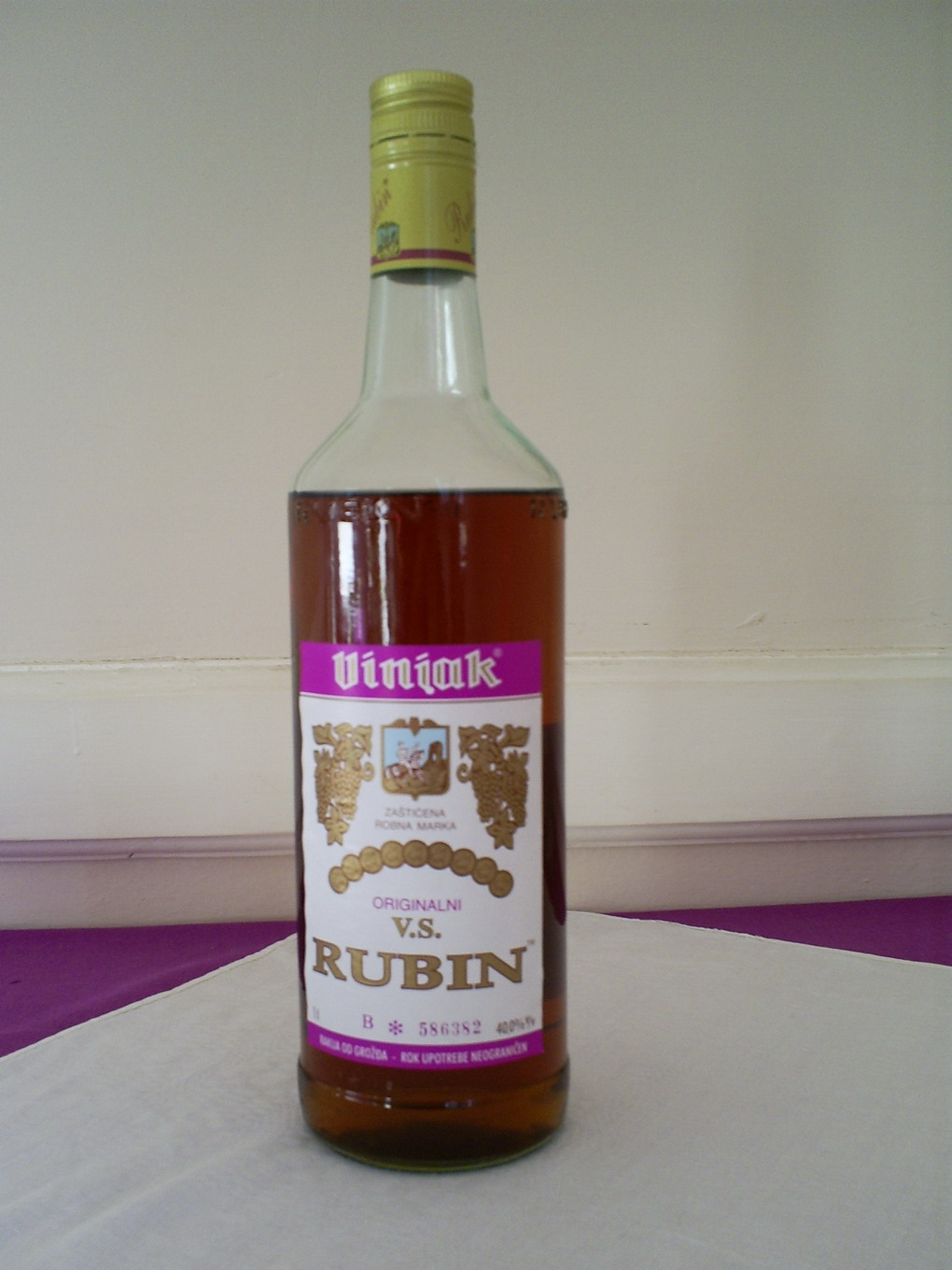
A bottle of Vinjak V.S. brandy

Vinjak (Serbian Cyrillic: Вињак) is a brand of brandy produced by the Serbian company Rubin. Previously named as Cognac (Serbian: Коњак / Konjak), it was renamed when stricter laws governing what may be branded Cognac came into force. The drink itself is light brown, and contains 40% alcohol.

Rubin, a company created in 1955 and privatised in 2005, has produced the drink since 1957. The spirit is produced by wine distillation, resulting in a 67–70 % alcohol-by-volume (abv) concentration. It is then aged several months to several years, depending on quality range, in oak casks of 500 litres each. Before bottling, it is mixed with distilled water, to obtain the 40% abv beverage. Between 4.8 and 5.5 million litres are produced each year. Like French cognac, Vinjak is labelled with V.S. ("Very Special"), 5 V.S.O.P. ("Very Special Old Pale") or XO ("Extra Old"), depending on how long it was aged.

Badel 1862 boasts the first brandy, later named Vinjak, produced in Croatia: Glembay 15 y.o. Distilled in the winery of Benkovac, the distillation process is identical to French cognac's. In 1970, the company introduced Cezar, another Vinjak.
