= Rubin (company) =

Alcoholic beverage company based in Kruševac, Serbia

Coordinates: 43°34′59″N 21°18′04″E

- Official logo
- Native name: Рубин
- Company type: a.d.
- Traded as: BELEX: RUBN
- Industry: Beverages
- Founded: 14 July 1955; 70 years ago
- Headquarters: Nade Marković 57, Kruševac, Serbia
- Area served: Worldwide
- Key people: Danijela Jovanović (General director); Zoran Bekrić (CEO)
- Products: Alcoholic beverages: wine, brandy and other spirits
- Revenue: ▲€25.86 million (2018)
- Net income: ▲€2.11 million (2018)
- Total assets: ▲€90.41 million (2018)
- Total equity: ▲€57.17 million (2018)
- Owner: Invej (100%)
- Number of employees: 309 (2018)
- Website: www.rubin.rs

Rubin (Serbian Cyrillic: Рубин) is a Serbian alcoholic beverages company headquartered in Kruševac.

== History ==
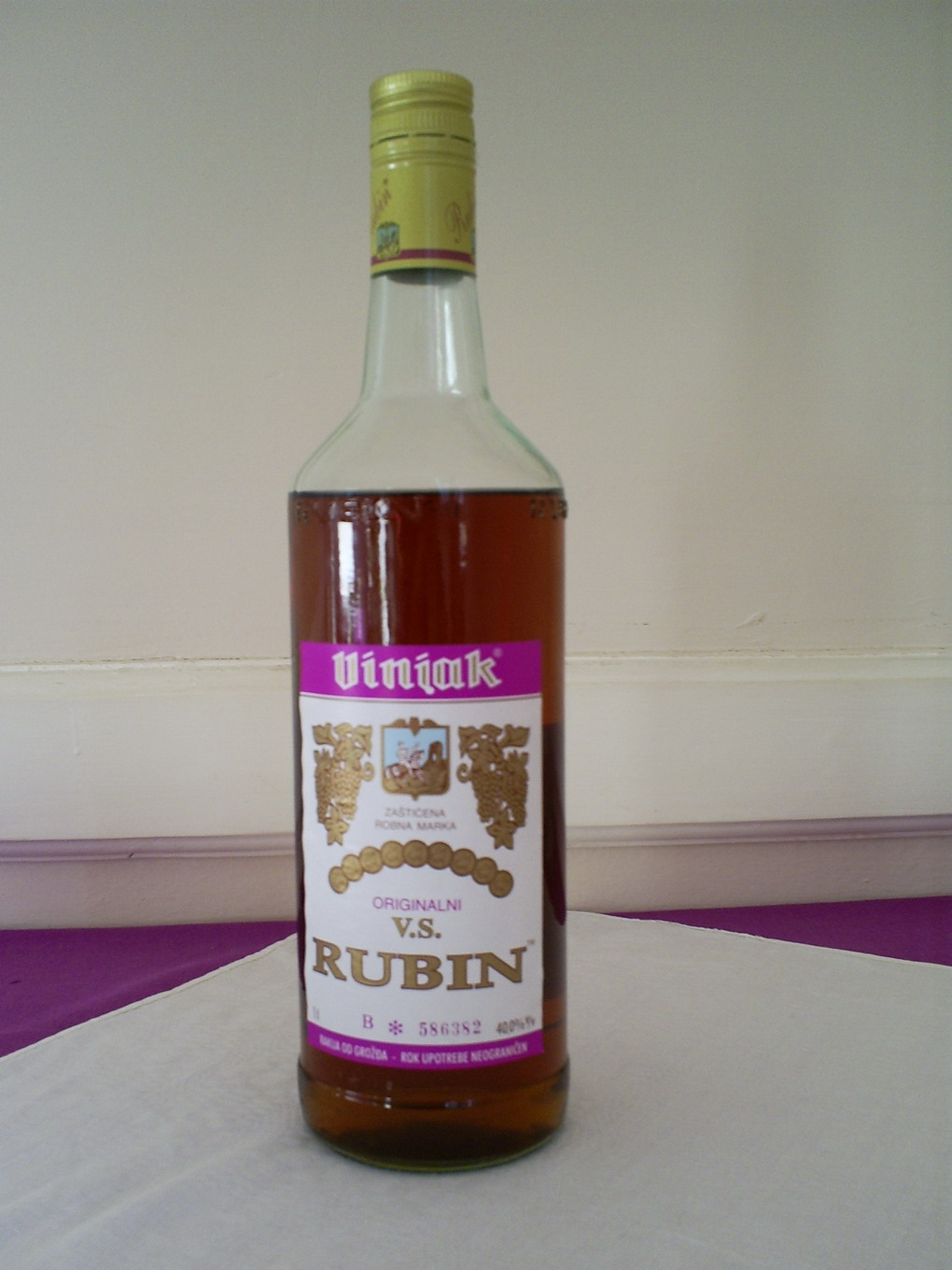
Popular "Vinjak" brandy in old bottle

Rubin was established in 1955. Located in the wine region of West Morava, it produces chiefly grapes, wine and alcoholic drinks. Its most renowned product is Rubinov Vinjak, type of brandy. In 2005, Rubin was purchased for 30 million euros by "Invej", Serbian company owned by controversial businessman Predrag Ranković Peconi.

== Market data ==
As of 21 February 2018, Rubin has a market capitalization of 32.79 million euros.

== See also ==
- List of companies of the Socialist Federal Republic of Yugoslavia
