= Château de Cognac =

Castle in Cognac, Nouvelle-Aquitaine, France

- Cognac, Nouvelle-Aquitaine, France
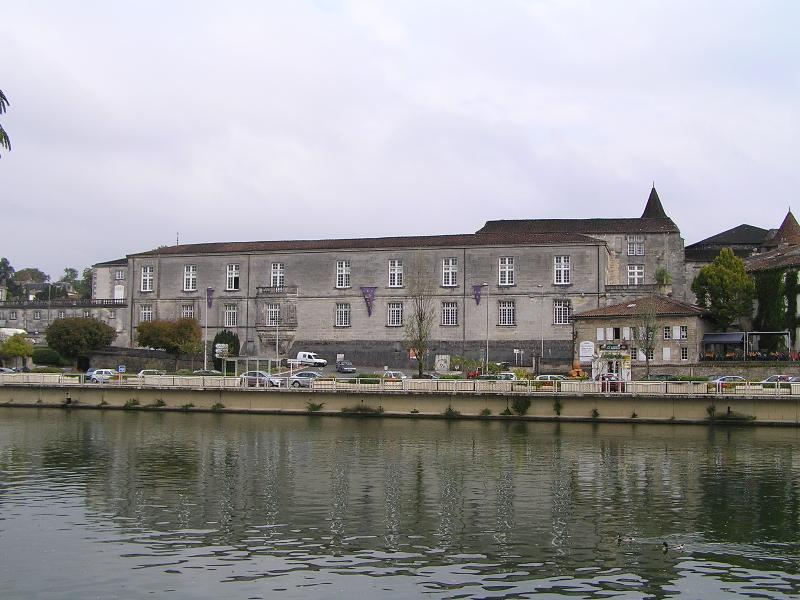
- Château de Cognac in 2007.

Location
- Coordinates: 45°42′N 0°20′W

Site history
- Built: 10th century

Château de Cognac, also known as Château de Valois and Château François, is a castle in Cognac, Nouvelle-Aquitaine, France. The castle has been rebuilt many times over the centuries.

Fortifications have existed since Hélie de Villebois, 1st Lord of Cognac built a fort around 950. Around the year 1000, Itier and Arnaud de Villebois settled on the site of Cognac and founded their dynasty there. This construction is known to us by a charter of 1030 and documents concerning the church of Saint Léger and the convent buildings which are adjacent to it, built from 1031 by the Benedictines. A small town was formed around the fort and priory.

Around 1200, the castle was rebuilt in stone, on the Charente river bank facing the docks and walls built to circle the town. Cognac passed by marriage of Amélie de Cognac to Philippe de Falcombridge, the illegitimate son of King Richard I of England. Philippe sold the lordship of to John, King of England. In 1202, John, King of England, entrusted the castle and its dependencies to Renaud II de Pons, Pons de Mirebeau and Robert de Torneham, then seneschal of Poitou. This was territory that rightfully belonged to the Count of Angoulême but had been controlled by his suzerain, the Count of Poiou since the 1180s.

After the death of King John in October 1216, Hubert de Burgh, seneschal of Poitou, had Cognac seized, sparking a war with Renaud II. Cognac was to be a source of friction for many years. King John's widow, Isabella, heiress of Anoulême, reasserted her rights over Cognac and enfeoffed her new husband, Hugh X of Lusignan. Renaud continued to wage war to keep his control of Cognac and its dependencies. De Lusignan took the castle of Cognac despite threats, including that of excommunication by Pope Honorius III. The Lusignan's undertook extensions to the castle in the 13th century.

Between 1366 and 1370, the castle of Cognac was, together with the castle of Angoulême, were the main residences of Edward, Prince of Aquitaine and Wales, the son of King Edward III of England. King Philip IV of France linked the lordship of Cognac to the crown of France, however during the Hundred Years' War, the castle changed hands during sieges and treaties. Upon the release from captivity in England of John, Count of Angoulême, after 33 years, John finds the castle abandoned and in a ruinous condition. Reconstruction began on the castle in 1450.

His son Charles, Count of Angoulême and Louise of Savoy made Cognac an intellectual and artistic centre. Their son King Francis I of France built the long facade of the castle facing the banks during 1517. Due to a lack of maintenance, the castle became ruinous during the late 17th century and 18th century. The owner Charles, Count d'Artois sold some buildings to finance repairs. The castle was sold as national property for demolition, but in 1795 was purchased by traders Messrs Otard and Dupuy, to install cellars. During the 19th century, renovations caused the destruction of sections of the castle, however important restoration work of conservation and restoration, was also undertaken.
