= Otard =

French cognac house

Otard, is a French cognac house founded in 1795 by Jean-Baptiste Antoine Otard. It was founded at the Château de Cognac, and is also sold under the name Château Royal de Cognac. Baron Otard Cognac was owned by the Otard family until it was bought by Bass Plc, the British brewers. It was subsequently sold to the Italian company Martini & Rossi S.p.A. in 1991. Today, Baron Otard Cognac is a subsidiary of the Bacardi Group.
