= Pons (personal name) =

Pons (Catalan pronunciation: [pons]) is a surname of Catalan origin. It is also given name. Within a person's personal name, it is sometimes used as a first name or middle name.

Pons is also sometimes used mononymously (e.g., by someone who is known simply as Pons, as Jorge Mario Bergoglio (Pope Francis) is sometimes known as "Francis").

Notable people with this name include:

== Surname ==
=== A–J ===
- Abel Molinero Pons (born 1989), Spanish footballer
- Alain Pons (born 1995), Gibraltarian footballer
- Antoinette de Pons-Ribérac (1560–1632), French courtier
- Antonio Pons (1897–1980), Ecuadorian politician
- Axel Pons (born 1991), Spanish motorcycle racer and model; son of Sito Pons, brother of Edgar Pons
- Beatrice Pons (1906–1991), American actor
- Bernadeth Pons (born 1996), Filipino volleyball player
- Bernard Pons (born 1926), French politician and physician
- Bonne de Pons d'Heudicourt (1644–1709), French courtier
- Cipriano Pons (1890–unknown), Argentine fencer and Olympics competitor
- Edgar Pons (born 1995), Spanish motorcycle racer; son of Sito Pons, brother of Axel Pons
- Eduard Pons Prades (1920–2007), Spanish anarchist, writer, historian, and politician
- Eolo Pons (1914–2009), Argentine painter
- Esteban González Pons (born 1964), Spanish politician
- Facundo Pons (born 1995), Argentine footballer
- Fabrizia Pons (born 1955), Italian race car driver
- Félix Pons (1942–2010), Spanish politician; brother of Josep Maria Pons Irazazábal
- Francisco Pons y Boigues (1861–1899), Spanish Arabist and historian
- Francisco Vallejo Pons (born 1982), Spanish chess grandmaster
- Frank Moya Pons (born ?), Dominican historian, writer, and educator
- Frédéric Pons (born 1954), French army officer and journalist
- Gastón Pons Muzzo (c.1922–2004), Peruvian chemist
- Geoffroy III de Pons (died 1191), French noble
- Ingrid Pons (born 1975), Spanish basketball player and Olympics competitor
- Jaufre de Pons (fl.c.13th-cent.), French troubadour
- Jaurés Lamarque Pons (1917–1982), Uruguayan composer and pianist
- Jean François Pons (1688–1752), French Jesuit priest, philologist, and Indologist
- Jean-Louis Pons (1761–1831), French astronomer
- Jim Pons (born 1943), American bass guitarist, singer, and film and video director
- Joan Lluís Pons (born 1996), Spanish swimmer and Olympics competitor
- Josep Pons (disambiguation), several people
- Josette Pons (born 1947), French politician
- Juan Pons (born 1946), Spanish operatic baritone singer
- Julia Pons (born 1994), Spanish field hockey player

=== L–Z ===
- Laia Pons (born 1993), Spanish synchronized swimmer and Olympic medalist
- Lele Pons (born 1996), Venezuelan and American internet personality, actor, and singer
- Léo Pons (born 1996), French filmmaker
- Lily Pons (1898–1976), French-born American operatic soprano singer and actor
- Louis Pons (born 1927), French collage artist
- Louis Marc Pons, marquis de Pons (fl.1789), French diplomat
- Luciano Pons (born 1990), Argentine footballer
- Marc Capdevila Pons (born 1974), Spanish swimmer and Olympics competitor
- Marcello Rodriguez Pons (born 1965), Argentine architect, designer, and sailor
- María Pons (disambiguation), several people
- Mario Pons (born 1967), Ecuadorian cyclist and Olympics competitor
- Marina Pons (born 1977), Spanish sport shooter and Olympics competitor
- Mercè Pons (born 1966), Spanish actor
- Norma Pons (1942–2014), Argentine actor and showgirl
- Olivier Pons (born 1958), French rower and Olympics competitor
- Pascal Pons (born 1968), French percussionist
- Patrick Pons (1952–1980), French motorcycle racer
- Paul Pons (1864–1915), French wrestler
- Paul-Marie Pons (1904–1996), French naval engineer and civil servant
- Pere Pons (born 1993), Spanish footballer
- Rainaut de Pons (fl.12th or 13th-cent.), French troubadour of indiscernible identity
- Ramón Pons (1940–2014), Spanish actor
- Raymond Pons (a.k.a. Pons I; died after 944), French noble; Count of Toulouse
- Renaud de Pons (seneschal of Gascony) (fl.1189–1228), French noble and Crusader; uncle of Renaud II de Pons
- Renaud II de Pons (c.1170–1252), French noble and Crusader; nephew of Renaud de Pons (seneschal of Gascony)
- Richard Fitz Pons (c.1080–1129), Anglo-Norman noble and warrior
- Salvador Salort-Pons (born 1970), Spanish-born American art historian and museum director
- Sito Pons (born 1959), Spanish motorcycle racer and team owner; father of Axel and Edgar Pons
- Stanley Pons (born 1943), American-born French electrochemist and cold fusion experimenter
- Teodoro Pons (1896–1968), Spanish runner and Olympics competitor
- Ventura Pons (1945–2024), Spanish film director
- Víctor Pons (1935–1999), Puerto Rican American justice, attorney, and political campaign manager
- Vimala Pons (born 1986), Indian-born French actor and juggler
- Xavier Pons (born 1980), Spanish race car and motorcycle driver
- Yves Pons (born 1999), Haitian-born French basketball player

=== In fiction ===
- Solar Pons, a detective created by writer August Derleth in 1928

== Given name ==
=== First or mononymous name ===
- Pons Augustin Alletz (1703–1785), French agronomist
- Pons, Count of Tripoli (c.1098–1137), French noble-born Count of Tripoli
- Pons d'Arsac (fl.1162–1181), French Catholic archbishop
- Pons de Cabrera (fl.1105–1162), Catalan nobleman, courtier and military leader
- Pons de Capduelh (fl.12th–13th-cent.), French troubadour
- Pons de Cimiez (died 257), Gallo-Roman Christian martyr and saint
- Pons de la Guardia (fl.1154–1188), Catalan knight, troubadour, and poet
- Pons de Minerva (1114/15–1175) Occitan noble, courtier, governor, and general
- Pons de Monlaur (fl.early 13th-cent.), French lord and troubadour
- Pons d'Ortaffa (c.1170–1246), Catalan noble and troubadour
- Pons I (a.k.a. Raymond Pons; died after 944), French noble; Count of Toulouse
- Pons II (991–1060), French noble; Count of Toulouse
- Pons Maar (born 1951), American actor, puppeteer, artist, and filmmaker
- Pons of Balazun (died 1099), Occitan noble, Crusader, and historian
- Pons of Melgueil (c.1075–1126), French noble and abbot
- Pons of the Cross (fl.c.13th-cent.), European knight, and Master of the Templars
- Pons Santolh (fl.c.13th-cent.), French troubadour

=== Middle name ===
- Georges-Antoine-Pons Rayet (1839–1906), French astronomer
- Henri-Pons de Thiard de Bissy (1657–1737), French Catholic bishop and cardinal
- Jean-Pons-Guillaume Viennet (1777–1868), French politician, playwright, and poet

== See also ==
- Pontius (disambiguation), a related name
