= De Pons =

De Pons or de Pons may refer to:

- Antoinette de Pons-Ribérac (1560–1632), French courtier
- Bonne de Pons d'Heudicourt (1644–1709), French courtier
- Geoffroy III de Pons (died 1191), French noble
- Jaufre de Pons (fl. c. 13th-cent.), French troubadour
- Louis Marc Pons, marquis de Pons (fl. 1789), French diplomat
- Rainaut de Pons (fl. 12th or 13th-cent.), French troubadour of indiscernible identity
- Renaud de Pons (seneschal of Gascony) (fl. 1189–1228), French noble and Crusader; uncle of Renaud II de Pons
- Renaud II de Pons (c. 1170–1252), French noble and Crusader; nephew of Renaud de Pons (seneschal of Gascony)

== Places ==
- Keep of Pons, Château de Pons, or Donjon de Pons (founded 1187), a French fortified tower

== See also ==
- Dupont (disambiguation)
