= Raymond Carrance =

- Born: Raymond Carrance; January 24, 1921; Pons, Charente-Maritime, France
- Died: June 4, 1998 (aged 77); Passy, Haute-Savoie, France
- Other name: Czanara
- Occupations: Photographer, draughtsman, illustrator
- Known for: Homoerotic drawings and photographs of male nudes
- Notable work: Czanara: Photographs and Drawings

Raymond Carrance (24 January 1921 – 4 June 1998) was a French photographer, illustrator, and graphic artist, known in particular for his homoerotic imagery and refined figurative drawings under the pseudonym Czanara. Active mainly in the mid‑20th century, he produced photographs, photomontages, and book illustrations that combined classical influences with a discreet yet explicit focus on male beauty and desire.

== Life ==
Carrance was born on 24 January 1921 in Pons, in the Charente-Maritime department in western France. He died on 4 June 1998 in Passy in the Haute‑Savoie department. He worked largely outside the mainstream art system, developing a body of drawings and photographs that circulated in limited editions, specialized publications, and private collections rather than in major institutional exhibitions during his lifetime.

== Artistic career ==
From the 1950s and 1960s, Carrance produced photographs, photomontages, and drawings that explored themes of male adolescence, sensuality, and homoerotic longing, often signing the work “Czanara”. His imagery ranges from studio nudes and seaside scenes to staged compositions that juxtapose male figures with modernist architecture and landscape.

Carrance also worked as a book illustrator, contributing etchings and lithographs to editions of authors such as Jules Renard, Edmond Rostand’s “Cyrano de Bergerac”, and works by Henry de Montherlant, including a 1951 gay‑themed novel.

== Style and themes ==
Carrance’s drawings in pencil and ink are noted for precise line, delicate shading, and a restrained, lyrical treatment of the male nude, often placing contemplative young figures in sunlit architectural or Mediterranean‑like settings. His photographs similarly balance sensuality and reserve, frequently presenting male subjects in relaxed, unposed attitudes that emphasize atmosphere as much as anatomy. Within mid‑20th‑century European homoerotic art, Carrance’s work is characterized by its mix of classical idealization and introspective melancholy, rather than overtly pornographic presentation. Critics and later commentators have situated his practice within a broader queer visual culture that negotiated censorship and social taboo through coded imagery and limited distribution.

== Legacy and exhibitions ==
Carrance’s work, often obscure during his lifetime, has been posthumously highlighted in publications such as the monograph “Czanara: Photographs and Drawings”, which introduced his photographs and illustrations to a wider audience. Image selections and essays in LGBTQ+ media have further contributed to renewed interest in his oeuvre. In the 21st century, galleries and auction houses have organized exhibitions and sales of his photographs and photomontages—frequently under the name Czanara—emphasizing his importance as a creator of homoerotic imagery and as a representative of a lesser‑known strand of French postwar photography.

== Bibliography ==
- Daniel, Marc (1969). Czanariana I: Un certain regard sur un certain monde – 50 dessins (in French). France: Édités à compte d’auteur.
- Andreou, Evangelos (1993). "Raymond Carrance". EI (in Greek). 1. European Art Center of Greece (EUARCE).
- Carrance, Raymond (2007). Czanara: Photographs & Drawings. New York: Antinous Press. ISBN 978-1-57687-382-3.
