= Renaud II de Pons =

French nobleman

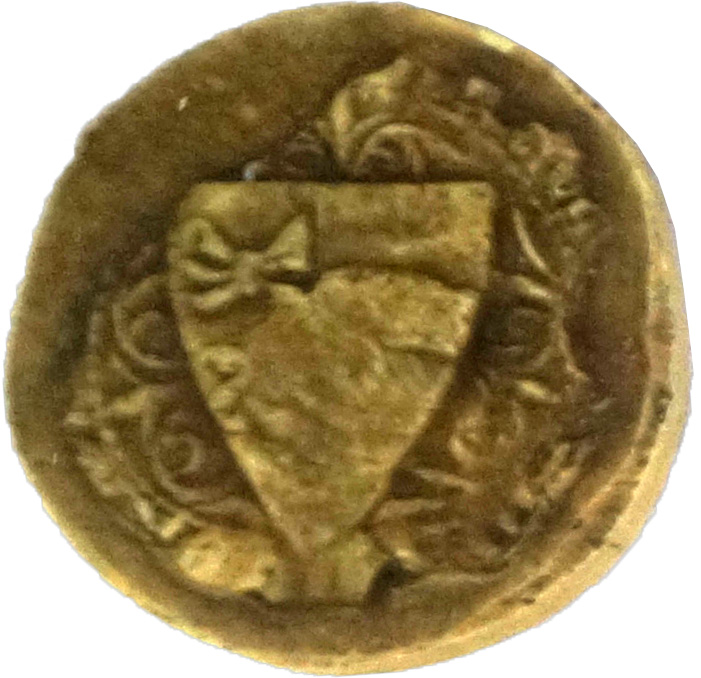
- Seal of Lord of Pons, dating from 1230.
- Died: 1252
- Father: Geoffroy III de Pons
- Mother: Agnès de Matha

Renaud II (c. 1170 – 11 June 1252), also known as Reginald de Pontibus or Renaud de Ponz, was a French nobleman and the lord of Pons in the Saintonge region of the County of Poitou from 1191 until his death. In the Anglo-French dynastic conflict, he was a strong supporter of John, King of England. He left Poitou three times to fight infidels: the Third Crusade, the Reconquista in Spain and the Seventh Crusade. He is distinguished from his uncle, Renaud de Pons, Seneschal of Gascony, in contemporary documents by the epithets senior (the elder) and junior (the younger). He is possibly the same person as the troubadour Rainaut de Pons.

== Life ==
Renaud was the eldest son of Geoffroy III de Pons and Agnès de Matha. He succeeded his father as lord of Pons in 1191. In the same year he left to join the Third Crusade, confirming his father's donation to the almonry of Chansac before he left. He was probably at least twenty years old at the time.

Returning from the crusade, Renaud married Marguerite, lady of Montignac, the only child and heiress of Taleyrand, lord of Montignac. She was thus a niece of Count Elias V of Périgord. Her mother was probably Maeuz, the lady celebrated by the troubadour Bertran de Born.

In 1202, John, King of England, entrusted the castle of Cognac and its dependencies to Renaud II de Pons, Pons de Mirebeau and Robert de Torneham, then seneschal of Poitou. Renaud and Pons were uterine brothers. This was territory that rightfully belonged to the Count of Angoulême but had been controlled by his suzerain, the Count of Poiou since the 1180s.

In 1206, Renaud was one of those who swore on John's behalf to uphold the two-year truce concluded with Philip II, King of France, extending the peace that had ended the Anglo-French war in 1204.

On 6 April 1212, Renaud pledged to pay an indemnity of 20,000 sous of Poitiers for damage his men had done to the property of the abbey of Saint-Jean-d'Angély during a military campaign. He was at the time, "willingly entering the land of Spain to meet the Saracens for the defence of the Christian faith" (Sarracenis Hispaniae terram intrantibus volens occurrere pro defensione fidei christianae). He probably joined the campaign that resulted in the Christian victory at the battle of Las Navas de Tolosa on 16 July 1212.

Following the declaration of war against France by Otto IV, Holy Roman Emperor, in 1213 Philip II called up his barons. Renaud was one of them, but like most Poitevins he ignored the summons and remained loyal to John, who landed at La Rochelle with an army to assist Otto in February 1214. The result of the war was a French victory at the battle of Bouvines. Renaud was one of the guarantors of the Truce of Chinon (September 1214), of which his uncle had been a negotiator on the English side.

After the death of King John in October 1216, Hubert de Burgh, seneschal of Poitou, had Cognac seized, sparking a war with Renaud II. Cognac was to be a source of friction for many years. John's widow, Isabella, heiress of Anoulême, reasserted her rights over Cognac and enfeoffed her new husband, Hugh X of Lusignan. Renaud continued to wage war to keep his control of Cognac and its dependencies.

Nothing is known of Renaud II's life from contemporary documents between 1214 and 1226. It is probable that he took part in the war between John's son, Henry III of England, and Philip's son, Louis VIII of France, over Poitou in 1224. In 1226, he did homage to the new French king, Louis IX, for the fiefs he held in the counties of Angoulême and La Marche, as well as the castle of Montignac (which he had from his wife) and a fief at Pons which Louis had conferred on him as a reward for unspecified services.

Despite this, Renaud's loyalty to the French crown was weak. In 1234 and again in 1236 Henry III appointed him enforcer (dictator) the treaties signed with Louis IX. In 1241 he joined the coalition being formed by Hugh X of Lusignan against Louis IX and his brother, Alphonse, count of Poitou since 1225. His younger son Pons went to England to convince Henry III to lend his aid to the rebels. This mission was apparently successful, for in the resulting war in the Saintonge, Henry III came to France with an army and even stayed for eight days at Pons. Following the surrender of Saintes to Louis on 28 July 1242, however, Renaud abandoned the pro-English party. Louis and Alphonse camped beneath the castle walls of Pons and there Renaud did homage for the lordship to Alphonse. Louis appointed him dictator of the Treaty of Bordeaux (7 April 1243), which ended the brief war.

Renaud, around 80 years old, joined his lord, Alphonse, on the Seventh Crusade being organized by Louis IX in late 1248. He left his eldest son, Geoffroy IV, in charge in his absence. He died overseas on 11 June 1252, having drawn up a will.

== Marriage and issue ==
With Marguerite, Renaud had the following known issue:

- Geoffroy IV of Pons (died 1247), married Agathe de Lusignan, had issue.
- Raimond de Pons, Lord of Viroul, Lorzines, Nianc and Pré des Angles.
- Pons de Pons, Bishop of Santes
- Jean de Pons
- Mahaut de Pons
- Agnès de Pons, married firstly Savary IV of Thouars and secondly Guillaume IV de Sainte Maure, had issue.
