= Guilhem de Montanhagol =

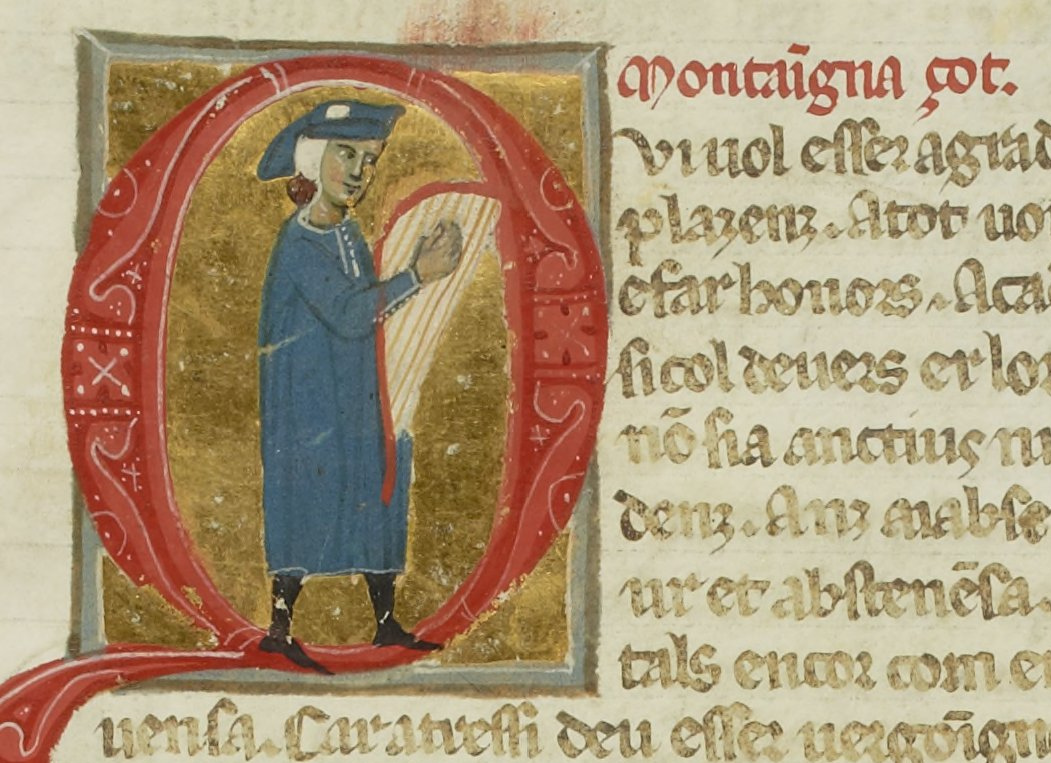
Miniature of Montanhagol playing a harp from a 13th-century chansonnier

Guilhem de Montanhagol (fl. 1233–1268) was a Provençal troubadour, most likely active in Toulouse, but known in the courts of Provence, Toulouse, Castile, and Aragon. Guilhem left behind seven cansos and six sirventes. He also left behind one tenso (specifically, a partimen) with Sordello (perhaps suggesting a brief sojourn in Lombardy) and his total surviving output comes to fourteen pieces.

The meaning of Guilhem's name has been debated. "Montanhagol" means "from Montanhac", but it is not known which of the several places named Montanhac that could be. For a long time it was thought that the correct form of the troubadour's name was simply "Guilhem Montanhagol", since the "de" (of) would be redundant. Contemporary documents, however, clearly use "de".

He was of humble birth. According to his vida he was from Provence, though some modern scholars suspect he was a Toulousain. His vida records that he was "a good inventor (trobaire) of poetry, and a great lover." His lover was a lady named Jauseranda from Lunel, the lord of which castle, Raymond Gaucelm V, Guilhem probably knew.

His cansos are awkward, and he emulated the earlier troubadours, praising mezura (moderation) among all the virtues. He stated that "from love proceeds chastity" (d'amor mou castitatz), which may mean no more than that love is necessary for fidelity. He has been viewed, most ardently by Cesare de Lollis, as a precursor of the Dolce Stil Novo and as an important link between Occitan and Italian literature through his work with Sordello. He has been credited with an innovative picture of courtly love blended with Christian morality, and indeed he refers to noel dig de maestria ("a new saying of mastery"), though this is probably not an indication of any conscious reformation.

Guilhem's political sirventes concern Toulousain and Spanish politics. Writing in the aftermath of the Albigensian Crusade which devastated Languedoc, Guilhem was an opponent of the Papal Inquisition, though not of the Church itself. He encouraged the gentle correction of the Cathars, but not their violent suppression by means of war.

Guilhem was grieved in a planh written by his brother-in-law Pons Santolh.

== Works ==
- A Lunel lutz una luna luzens
- Ar ab lo coinde pascor
- Del tot vey remaner valor
- Bel m'es quan d'armatz aug refrim
- Ges, per malvastat qu'er veya
- Leu chansoneta m'er a far
- No sap per que va son joy pus tarzan
- Non an tan dig li primier trobador
- Non estarai, per ome qe-m casti
- Nulhs hom no val ni deu esser prezatz
- On mais a hom de valensa
- Per lo mon fan li un dels autres rancura
- Qui vol esser agradans e plazens
- Senh'En Sordel, mandamen
