= Renaud de Pons (seneschal of Gascony) =

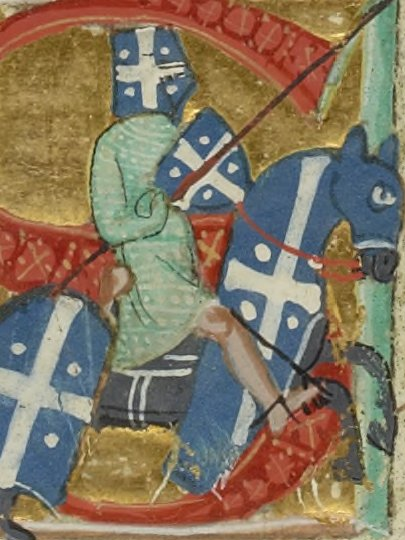
Near-contemporary miniature depicting the troubadour Rainaut de Pon, possibly to be identified with Renaud.

Renaud de Pons (fl. 1189–1228) was a nobleman from the Saintonge. He served as Seneschal of Gascony between 1214 and 1217 and briefly as Seneschal of Poitou in 1216. He went on the Fifth Crusade in 1217–21. He and his nephew, Renaud II de Pons, are distinguished in contemporary documents by the epithets senior (the elder) and iunior (the younger). He is also known by the epithet Palmarius because he was a crusader.

Renaud was the second son of Pons I, lord of Pons, and Germasia. He first appears in the historical record when he consented to a donation of family property made by his elder brother, Geoffroy III, to the Abbey of Saint-Florent de Saumur in 1189. The following year he and his brother confirmed a donation of Richard I, King of England, to the Abbey of La Sauve-Majeure.

By June 1214 Renaud was in the following of John, King of England. He was one of the commissioners, along with Hubert de Burgh and Aimery de Rochefort, authorized by John to negotiate a truce with King Philip Augustus of France. The result was the Truce of Chinon that ended the war between England and France on 18 September 1214. Renaud and his nephew stood among the guarantors of the treaty. Earlier that year, with Aimery VII of Thouars and Savari de Mauléon among others, he had guaranteed the peace treaty between John and the count of La Marche, Hugh IX.

Renaud was appointed seneschal of Gascony in 1214, replacing Geoffrey de Neville. John also granted Renaud the wardship of Theobald le Botiller and custody of his lands of Weeton, Treules and Routhcliffe in Ireland. Henry, Archbishop of Dublin, was also requested in August 1214 to hand over the castles of Dorles, Rashue, Loshe, Armolen and Kakaulis which belonged to Theobald Walter in Ireland.

Renaud received a royal instruction dated 20 November ordering him to "extirpate" heretics—Cathars—whose heresy was spreading. In 1216, John's successor, Henry III, sent a letter to Renaud demanding he renew the oath of fealty he had taken before John. In it he addressed Renaud as lord of Pérignac and seneschal of Gascony and Poitou. A report written for Henry III in 1235, long after Renaud's death, suggests that Renaud's government of Gascony was harsh even for non-heretics.

In May 1217, in order to allow Renaud to fulfill a vow to go on a pilgrimage, Henry III appointed the archbishop of Bordeaux, Guillaume Amanieu, as Seneschal of Gascony and Poitou in his absence. According to Pope Honorius III, writing in 1219, Renaud's vow to go to the Holy Land was a pretext to put off handing over to Henry the castle of Merpins and the hostages which Henry's father had entrusted to him. Honorius was writing to the bishop of Angoulême, the abbot of Nanteuil and the deacon of the cathedral of Bordeaux asking them to intervene with Renaud and threaten him with excommunication if he did not hand over what was not his. The pope accused Renaud of conspiring with his brother, Pons, bishop of Saintes, to retain his hold on Merpins.

Renaud joined the Fifth Crusade and fought at the Siege of Damietta, where he was singled out by Matthew of Paris for his actions during the assault of 29 August 1219.

Renaud last appears as a confirmant to a charter of his nephew in 1228. He affixed his seal to the charter.

== Sources ==
- Calendar of Documents, Relating to Ireland: Preserved in Her Majesty's Public Record Office, London, 1171-1307. Vol. 1, 1171–1251. Longman. 1875.
- Chabaneau, Camille (1881). Les Troubadours Renaud et Geoffroy de Pons. Paris: Maisonneuve.
- Courcelles, Jean-Baptiste-Pierre (1824). "De Pons". Histoire généalogique et héraldique des pairs de France. Vol. IV. Paris.
