= Josep Pons (disambiguation) =

Josep Pons may refer to:

- Josep Maria Pons Irazazábal (born 1948), Spanish diplomat; brother of Félix Pons
- Josep Pons (born 1957), Spanish orchestra conductor
- Josep Pons Rosell (1918–2013), Spanish physical anthropologist and professor
