= César Phoebus d'Albret, Count of Miossens =

French soldier and court gallant

César Phoebus d'Albret
- Count of Miossens
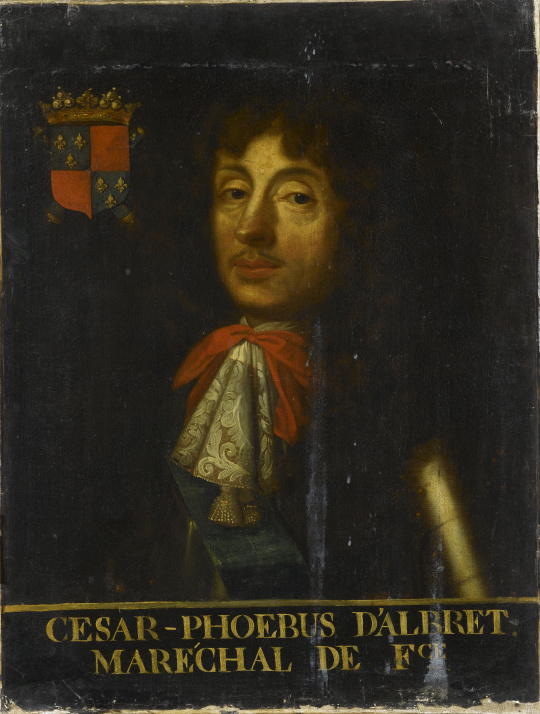
- César Phoebus d'Albret, maréchal de France
- Born: 1614
- Died: 3 September 1676 (aged 61–62)
- Father: Henri II d'Albret, Baron de Miossens
- Occupation: Soldier and courtier

César Phoebus d'Albret, comte de Miossens (1614 – 3 September 1676), was a French soldier, a Marshal of France under Louis XIV (his distant cousin), and a court gallant. He was also a cousin of the marquise de Montespan. His faithful attachment to Anne of Austria and Cardinal Mazarin during the Fronde, rather than any military talent, motivated his designation as a marshal of France (1 June 1653). He set aside the name of Miossens for the grander name of Albret.

== Military career ==
He first took up arms in the service of the United Provinces, under Maurice of Nassau and Jean de Werth in the Eighty Years' War against the Spanish in the Low Countries. In 1635 he was made maître de camp alongside his father in a French infantry regiment in the army of Lorraine and commanded a regiment in the siege of Corbie (1636). As a Captain in the regiment of Guards in 1639, he became successively ensign then Lieutenant of the Gendarmes de la Garde ordinaire du Roi in 1644, and second-in-command during the Fronde.

Though on intimate terms with the young duc d'Enghien, he nevertheless joined the party of Mazarin. On 19 January 1650 he was charged with escorting the arrested dukes of Conti, Condé and Longueville to the donjon at the château de Vincennes. Mazarin's promise of the rank of Marshal was extracted only at the price of pressures brought by court intrigues, in which César Phoebus was supported by his cousin Madame de Montespan, who was soon to supplant the young Louise de La Vallière in the King's affections. The title of duke continued to elude him.

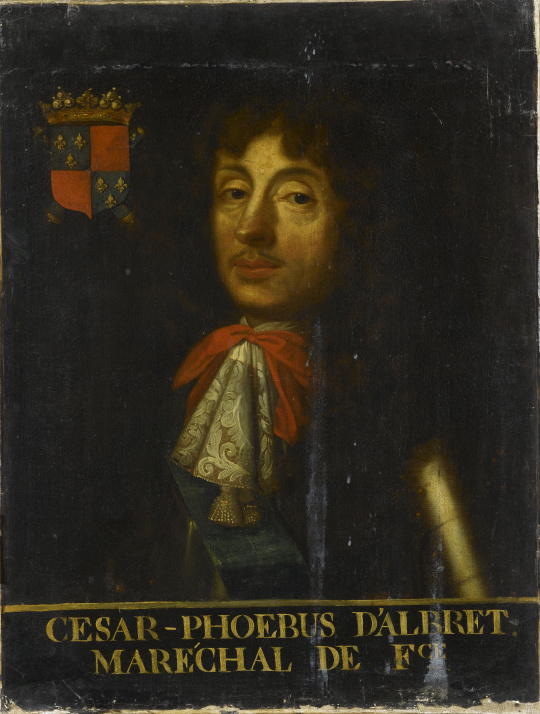
Portrait of César Phoebus, duc d'Albret, in the Musée de Versailles

He served as field marshal at the successful siege of Mardyck and at Dunkirk in 1646. "He was then 39 years of age and had served very little, never anywhere as a leader, and afterwards saw no more of war," the duc de Saint-Simon wrote in his memoirs. The Abbé d'Aumont, who had taken a box at the Comédie that the maréchal commanded for his own, was heard to remark, "A fine Marshal! He has never stormed anything except my box!"

== Court career ==
He married 6 February 1645, Madeleine de Guénégaud, daughter of Gabriel de Guénégaud, seigneur du Plessis-Belleville, a Secretary of State of the Maison du Roi. With Turenne's support, he was named a chevalier of the Ordre du Saint-Esprit, 31 December 1661, continuing the honour that was traditional in his family. The favour of the marquise de Maintenon secured him the post of governor of Guyenne from November 1670 to 1676. In 1675 he conducted a veritable campaign, pursued with energy, against the public uprising at Bordeaux over taxes on timber and tobacco, and successfully demolished the Porte Sainte Croix and 500 toises of the city ramparts.

Saint-Simon's incisive word portraits of the duc d'Albret were uncompromising: "He was a man of spirit, competent, proud, and even more, of intrigue. "He was a man who, without having served much and never in charge, made a good account of himself by his spirit, his courage, his address and his magnificence. He kept great state everywhere and had with him at Pons the best company". In Pons, he received the title "Sire de Pons" and is also known for his design of the monumental Grand Staircase, which would later connect the upper city to the lower city near the Keep of Pons, and was designed in the year 1665.

His exploits in gallantry are more considerable than his military ones. The list of his conquests is a long one: Marion Delorme, Ninon de Lenclos, with whom he fathered a son, Marguerite de Béthune-Sully, Madame d'Olone. He frequented the salon of Françoise d'Aubigné the future Madame de Maintenon, who said "Marshal d'Albret has always been my friend, I don't know he ever was my lover". Widowed by Paul Scarron she took refuge at the hôtel d'Albret, where she met Mme de Montespan, cousin by marriage of the maréchal as well as Bonne d'Heudicourt (his cousin of the Pons family, thanks to whom Mme de Montespan entrusted to her the education of the children she had with Louis XIV, who took a fancy to the widowed governess.
