= Truce of Chinon =

1214 treaty between England and France

The Truce of Chinon, which ended the Anglo-French war of 1213–14, was agreed to by King John of England and King Philip II of France on 18 September 1214 at the castle of Chinon. John's attempt to defeat Philip II in 1214, failed due to the French victory over John's allies at the battle of Bouvines. A peace agreement was signed in which John forfeited the Counties of Anjou and Poitou and the Duchy of Brittany and pay £60,000 in reparations to the French crown. The truce was intended to last until Easter 1220.

Hubert de Burgh, Renaud de Pons and Aimery de Rochefort negotiated the treaty on behalf of John.

== Context ==
The Treaty of Chinon is a treaty signed between the king of France Philippe II and the king of England John I on September 18, 1214, in Chinon, after the defeat of the allies on July 27 in Bouvines.

During the Battle of Bouvines, Philippe II broke a terrible coalition (Kingdom of England, Flanders, Holy Roman Empire) and won a decisive victory over the Germanic emperor Othon IV of Brunswick, allied to the England King John Lackland, and the count of Flanders Ferdinand. This victory will lead to the break-up of the Angevin Empire of the Plantagenets.

John I had to evacuate French territory and was forced by Pope Innocent III to accept the Treaty of Chinon, which consecrated the loss of his possessions north of the Loire: Berry and Touraine, with Maine and Anjou, returned in the royal domain, which now covered a third of the territory of present-day France. He also had to pay 60,000 pounds to the King of France. The English only retained the Guyenne, which included the western part of the Duchy of Gascony and a small portion of southwestern Aquitaine.
