= Frédéric Pons =

French Army officer and journalist (born 1954)

Frédéric Pons (born in 1954) is a French Army officer and journalist.

== Biography ==
Pons served as a Blue Helmet in Lebanon. He rose to the rank of colonel in parachute units of the Troupes de marine, and is now a reserve officer. He teaches at the Collège interarmées de défense (CID) and at École spéciale militaire de Saint-Cyr.

He also works as a journalist at Spectacle du Monde, and as chief redactor of the World service of Valeurs Actuelles. He is president of the Association des Journalistes de la Défense (AJD), an association of journalists specialised in Defence matters.

In 1996, Pons was awarder the Erwan Bergot literary prize by the Army for Les Français à Sarajevo.

== Works ==
- Esthétique et politique : les intellectuels fascistes français et le cinéma : Rebatet, Brasillach, Bardèche, 1930-1945, Master thesis, Université Paris-I, 1977
- Action humanitaire et politique internationale : Politique et morale (co-authored with Alain-Gérard Slama and Jean-Marc Varaut), CASE, 1993
- Les Paras sacrifiés, Beyrouth, 1983-1984, Presses de la Cité, 1994
- Les Français à Sarajevo : les bataillons piégés, 1992 - 1995, Presses de la Cité, 1996, Prix littéraire de l'armée de terre - Erwan Bergot en 1996
- Les Troupeaux du diable, Presses de la Cité, 1999
- Les Casques bleus français : 50 ans au service de la paix dans le monde, Italiques, 2002
- Les Soleils de l'Adour, Presses de la Cité, 2003
- Pièges à Bagdad, Presses de la Cité, 2004
- Passeurs de nuit, Presses de la Cité, 2006
- Israël en état de choc, Presses de la Cité, 2007
- La République des militaires (co-authored with Jean-Dominique Merchet), Jacob-Duvernet, 2007
- Mourir pour le Liban, Presses de la Cité, 2007
- Paras de choc au combat, Presses de la Cité, 2009
- Opérations extérieures, Presses de la Cité, 2009
- Algérie, le vrai état des lieux, Calmann-Lévy, 2013
- Poutine. Au cœur des secrets de la Russie moderne, Calmann-Lévy, 2014
- Les Constitutions arabes, dir. by Christophe Boutin and Jean-Yves de Cara, Karthala, 2016
- Le martyre des Chrétiens d'Orient, Calmann-Lévy, 2017
- Géopolitique des Émirats arabes unis, dir. by Charles Saint-Prot, Karthala, 2019
- Les Pèlerins du diable, Calmann-Lévy, 2019
- L'Arménie va-t-elle disparaître ? Un conflit oublié aux portes de l'Europe, Artège, 2023
