= Montagnac =

Montagnac or Montanhac may refer to the following places in France:

- Montagnac, Alpes-de-Haute-Provence, a former commune in the Alpes-de-Haute-Provence département that is now a part of Montagnac-Montpezat
- Montagnac, Gard, in the Gard département
- Montagnac, Gers, a former commune in the Gers département that is now in the commune of Catonvielle
- Montagnac, Hérault, in the Hérault département
- Montagnac-d'Auberoche, in the Dordogne département
- Montagnac-la-Crempse, in the Dordogne département
- Montagnac-Montpezat, in the Alpes-de-Haute-Provence département
- Montagnac-sur-Auvignon, in the Lot-et-Garonne département
- Montagnac-sur-Lède, in the Lot-et-Garonne département
- Montagnac, Algeria, colonial name for Remchi, a town and commune in Tlemcen Province, Algeria

== People with the surname Montagnac ==
People with the surname Montagnac or de Montagnac include:

- Lucien de Montagnac (1803–1845), French military officer
- Jeanne de Montagnac (1882–1966), French salonnière, arts patron, and singer
- Ishmel Demontagnac (born 1988), English footballer
