= Pons Santolh =

French troubadour and poet

Pons (de) Santolh was a thirteenth-century troubadour, probably a member of the Centulli family, but whether of the Castelsarrasin or Toulouse branch remains a mystery. He was a brother of the wife of Guilhem de Montanhagol. He composed a planh, "Marritz com oms mal sabens ab frachura", on his brother-in-law's death.
