= Rainaut de Pons =

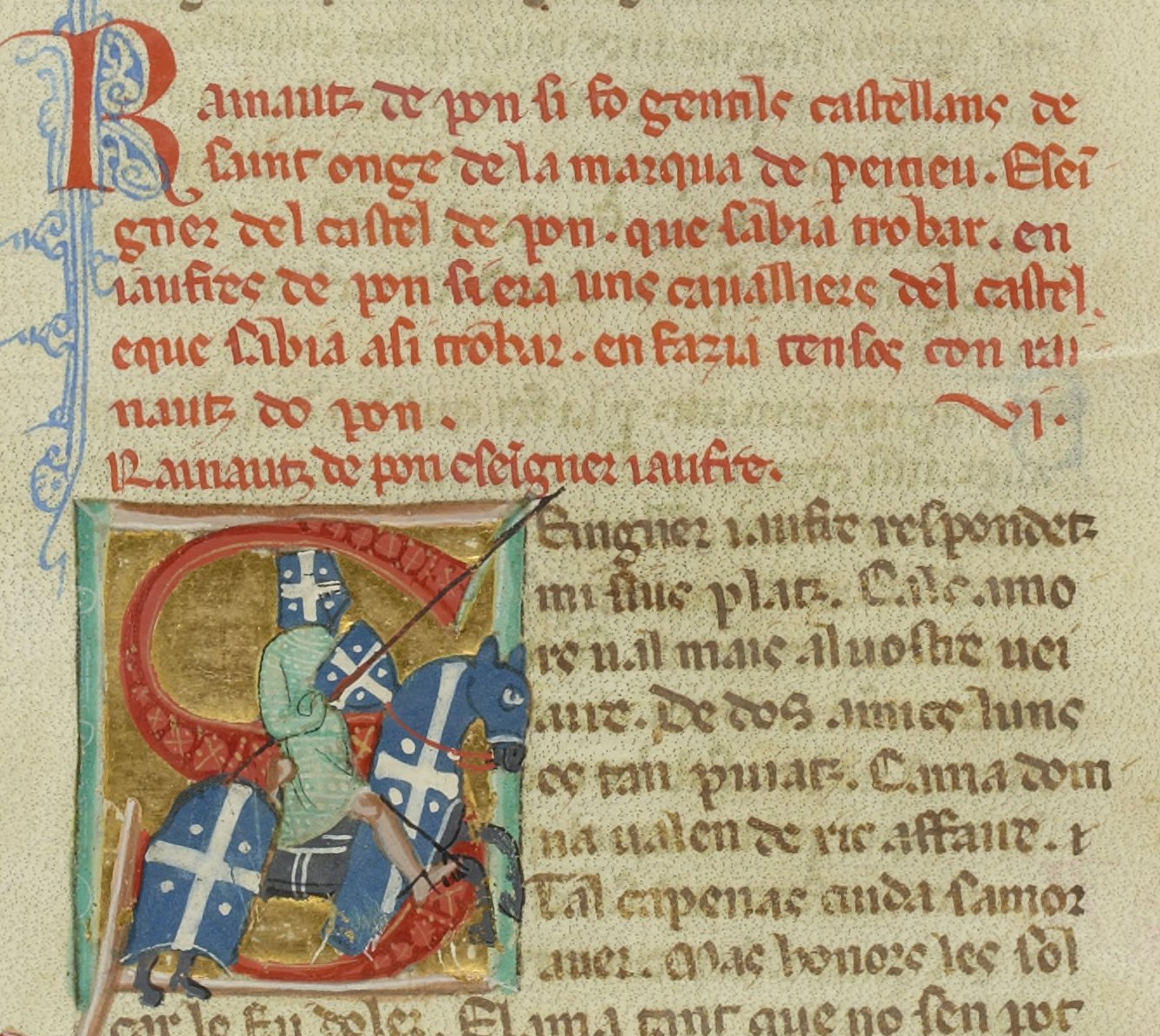
Rainaut de pon si fo gentils castellans de saintonge. . . "Rainaut de Pons was a genteel castellan from Saintonge. . ." He is depicted here, under his vida (red text), as a knight at arms on a caparisoned horse.

Rainaut de Pons (or de Pon), in French Renaud de Pons (Reginald of Pons), was a troubadour from the region of Saintonge in the County of Poitou. According to his vida, he was lord of the castle of Pons. He composed tensos with Jaufre de Pons, one of his retainers according to the vida. One of their partimens survives in several manuscripts.

The identity of the troubadour is not certain, but chronologically he must be either the Rainaut de Pons (fl. 1189–1228) who served as seneschal of Gascony in the period 1214–17, or the latter's nephew, Rainaut II, lord of Pons (fl. 1191–1252), an avid crusader.

== Sources ==
- Chabaneau, Camille. Les Troubadours Renaud et Geoffroy de Pons. Paris: Maisonneuve, 1881.
- Egan, Margarita, ed. and trans. The Vidas of the Troubadours. New York: Garland, 1984. ISBN 0-8240-9437-9.
