= Josep Pons Rosell =

Josep Pons Rosell (September 20, 1918 - July 28, 2013) is an anthropologist and professor at the Anthropology Department of the Biology Faculty of the University of Barcelona (UB) from 1973 to his retirement. In 1991 he was made academic of the Reial Acadèmia de Ciències i Arts of Barcelona.

Pons was born in L'Arboç del Penedès, Tarragona, Spain. He has worked mainly in the area of physical anthropology, which deals with the biological variability of the human population and the origin and evolution of the species.

The academic history of physical anthropology at the UB began in 1920 with the first professor of this subject, Telesforo de Aranzadi y Unamuno (1860 - 1945), whose successor as chair, Santiago Alcobé (who had also been rector of the UB) was later substituted by Pons. Together with Pons, the researchers Miquel Fusté and Antoni Prevosti (who subsequently developed the study of genetics at the university) received their training at the Anthropology Department of the UB with Alcobé. Later, the Anthropology Department was integrated, together with that of zoology, into the present Department of Animal Biology.

Both in his first stage as a researcher at the CSIC of the UB and later on during his period as chairman at different Spanish universities, Pons introduced Spain to the development of several lines of research in the field of anthropology, such as the osteology of populations, biodemography, molecular polymorphisms, somatology, and quantitative anthropology. His studies on dermatoglyphs from the point of view of population and genetics attracted attention. For ten years he was the chairman of the International Committee for the study of this anthropological speciality.
