= María Pons =

María Pons may refer to:

- María Antonieta Pons (1922–2004), Cuban-born Mexican dancer, actor, and singer
- María José Pons (born 1984), Spanish footballer
- María Magdalena Campos Pons (born 1959), Cuban-born American artist and arts educator
