= Marcello Rodriguez Pons =

Argentine–German architect

Marcello Rodríguez Pons
- Born: August 24, 1965 (age 61); Córdoba, Argentina
- Education: Architect; Master in Architectural and Urban Design
- Alma mater: National University of Córdoba, Argentina
- Occupations: Architect; designer; windsurfer
- Years active: 1994–present
- Employer(s): Rodriguez Pons & Partners (RP/A)
- Website: rodriguezpons.com

Marcello Rodríguez Pons (born 24 August 1965) is an Argentine–German architect, project manager, designer and competitive sailor. He is known for his designs, which include masterplans, mixed-use developments and waterfront projects in Latin America, Africa, Europe, Asia and the Middle East. He is also known for having been Windsurf World Champion in 1990, and a world “top 10” Windsurf Formula Foil sailor between 2016 and 2025 in the grand masters category. He is the founder and principal of RP/A, an architecture and urban design studio established in 2012.

Rodríguez Pons has participated in projects in more than twenty countries, including developments in Argentina, Uruguay, Brazil, Albania, China, Nigeria and Bahrain. His work frequently incorporates layered façades, controlled daylighting, environmentally responsive envelopes and natural materials, elements he refers to collectively as the “Wood & White” design language.

His projects have been recognised by several international platforms, including the Cityscape Global Awards and the World Architecture Community Awards. In 2025, he received a Silver A’ Design Award in Urban Planning for the Marinas de Punta Piedra project and an Iron A’ Design Award in Architectural Design for the Mauritius Club House & Amphitheatre.

Beyond his architectural career, Rodríguez Pons has competed in Windsurfing since the 1980s and in Sailing disciplines. He won multiple Argentina Nationals and South American windsurfing titles. He also won the 1990 Windsurfing Division II Lightweight World Championship and has represented Argentina in multiple world championships across different classes.

== Early life and education ==
Rodríguez Pons was born in Córdoba, Argentina, to a German mother and an Argentine father. He attended Academia Arguello for his primary schooling and later studied architecture at the National University of Córdoba, graduating as an architect in 1994. During his student years, he worked in architectural offices, where he began exploring conceptual design.

In 2000, he completed a master’s degree in Architectural and Urban Design at the same university. His early professional work ranged from small-scale product and furniture design to residential and hospitality projects.

Rodríguez Pons grew up in a bilingual environment and later developed proficiency in several languages. He speaks Spanish as his native language and German at a high level, in addition to high proficiency in English and French and intermediate proficiency in Italian. He has travelled to more than fifty countries across the Americas, Europe, Asia and Africa, gaining exposure to diverse cultural and architectural contexts.

== Career ==
After several years working independently in Argentina, Rodríguez Pons relocated to Málaga, Spain, where he served as an architect and project director at HCP Architecture & Engineering from 2002 to 2011.

In 2012, he founded his own practice, initially named RODRIGUEZ PONS & Partners and later rebranded as RODRIGUEZ PONS / Architects (RP/A). The firm focuses on large-scale masterplans, waterfront developments, residential complexes, and mixed-use buildings.

His work has been recognized by international platforms such as the Cityscape Global Awards and the World Architecture Community Awards. In 2025, he received a Silver A’ Design Award in Urban Planning for the Marinas de Punta Piedra masterplan, as well as an Iron A’ Design Award in Architectural Design for the Mauritius Club House & Amphitheatre.

In 2017, Rodríguez Pons published MASTERPLAN – Designs of a New Way of Living, a book that compiles texts, diagrams, visual studies, and case examples to provide a comprehensive perspective on the nature and importance of master planning. The volume explains conceptual, historical, and methodological aspects of masterplan development by referencing projects from his professional practice—both from his own architecture office and from collaborations with international firms over two decades. The book was presented at the Museo Emilio Caraffa in Córdoba, Argentina.

His projects have also been featured in architectural publications across Argentina, Spain, Uruguay, the United Arab Emirates, and the United States.

Among his most significant recognitions, his work was included in the 2017 book Arquitectos Argentinos en el Mundo Bis, where he appeared alongside four notable Argentine architects: César Pelli, Emilio Ambasz, Eduardo Catalano, and Eduardo Elkouss.

== Architectural style ==
Marcello Rodríguez Pons places particular emphasis on water-related architecture, using water as a central conceptual element in many of his proposals. His architectural approach is characterized by the “Wood & White” style, defined by the combined use of white surfaces and wooden elements, reflecting a contemporary and sustainable design language with subtle vernacular influences. A recurring feature of his designs is the application of layered façades that combine wood elements, blinds, balconies and shading systems intended to reduce solar gain.

At the urban scale, his masterplans frequently incorporate oval geometries as a strategy to structure circulation, define public spaces, and create spatial configurations that are organic, efficient, and easily identifiable.

In his architectural work, he assigns a central role to the study of natural light, carefully analyzing how solar exposure, shadow patterns, and orientation shape each environment. Guided by these parameters, he places particular emphasis on proportion, the balanced integration of recyclable materials, and advanced technologies.

== Gallery ==
Selected works by Marcello Rodríguez Pons

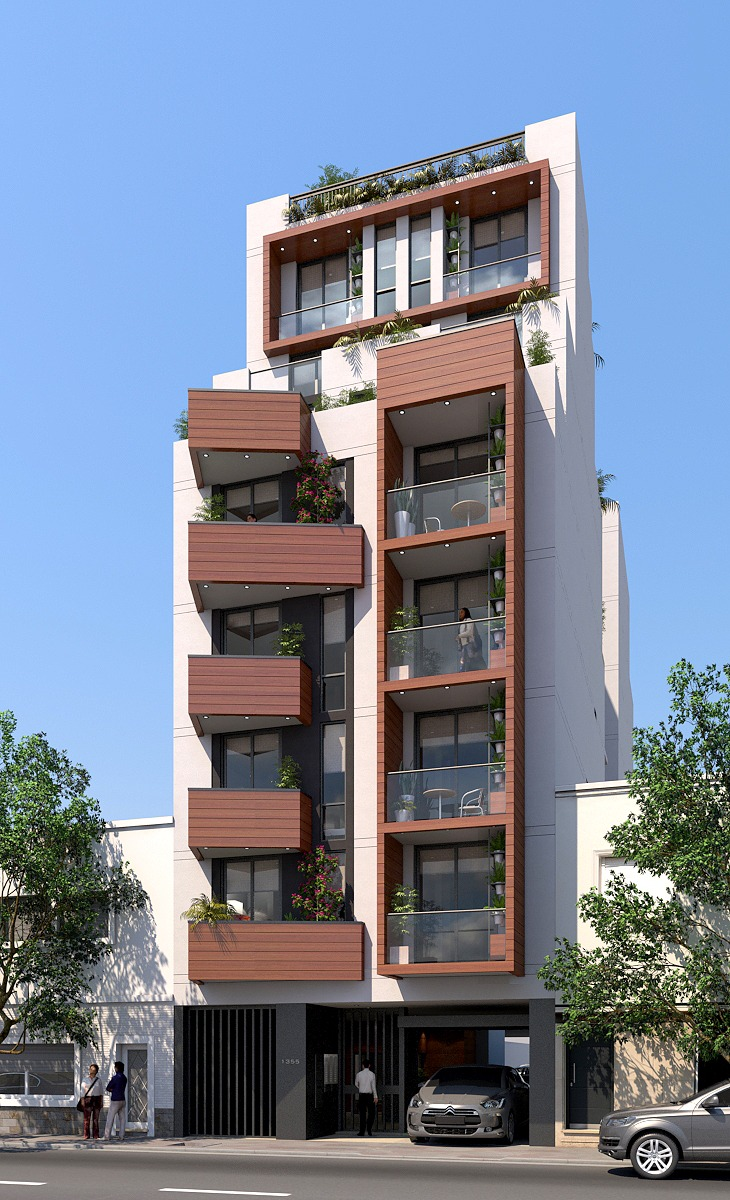
Parque Caballito (2018), Buenos Aires, Argentina

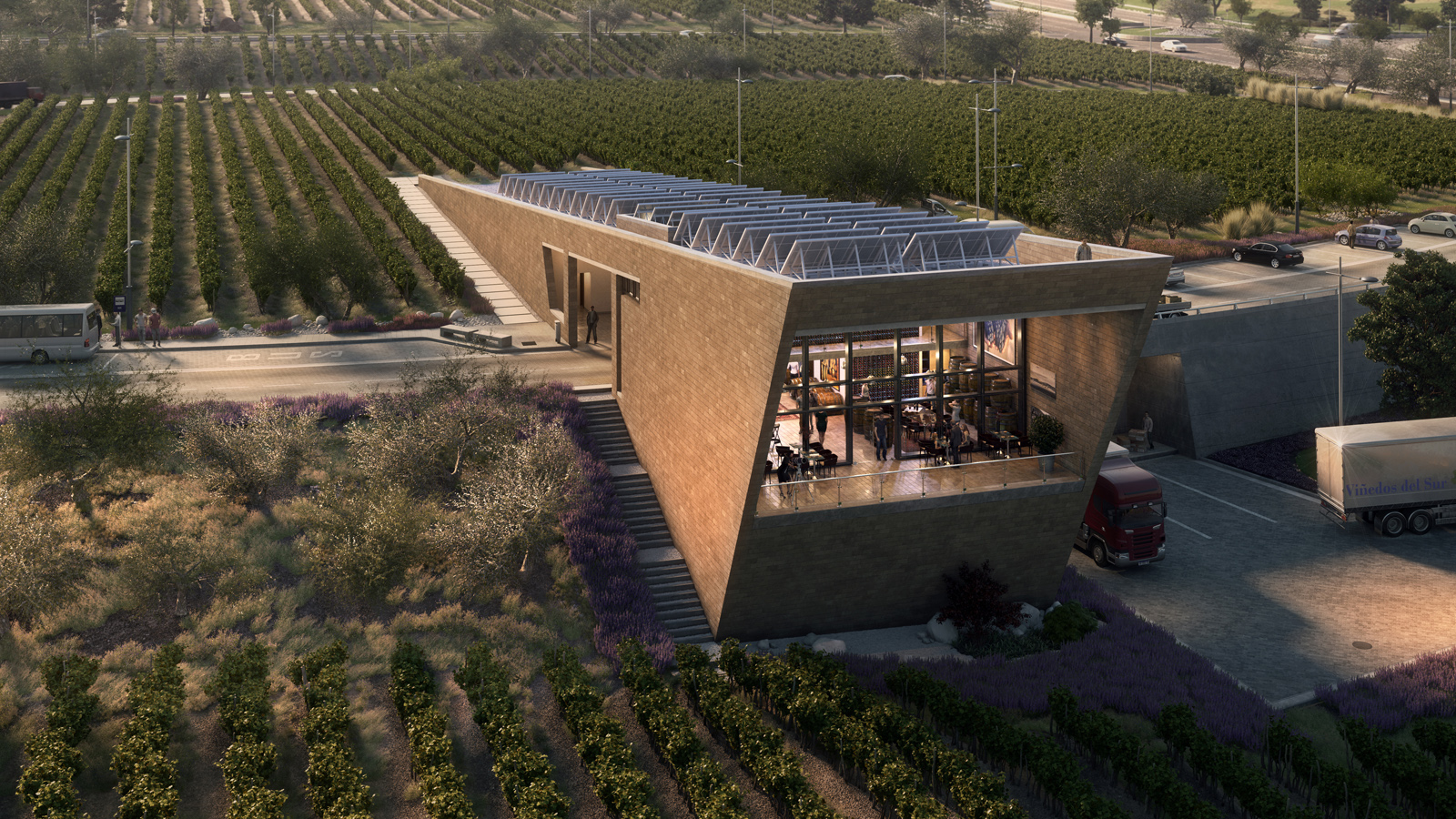
Punta Jabali Winery (2016), San Luis, Argentina

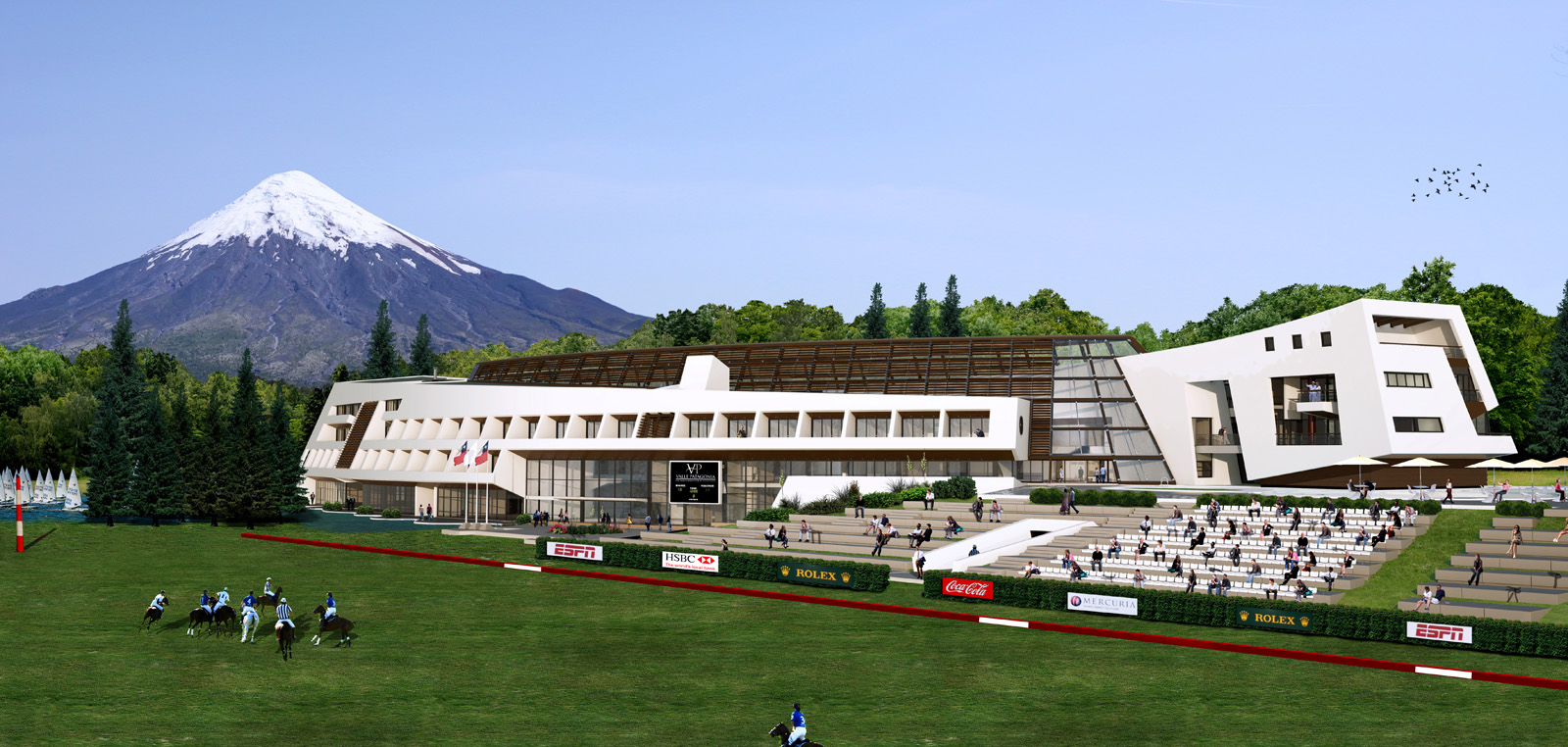
Valle Patagonia Polo Club (2013), Puerto Varas, Chile

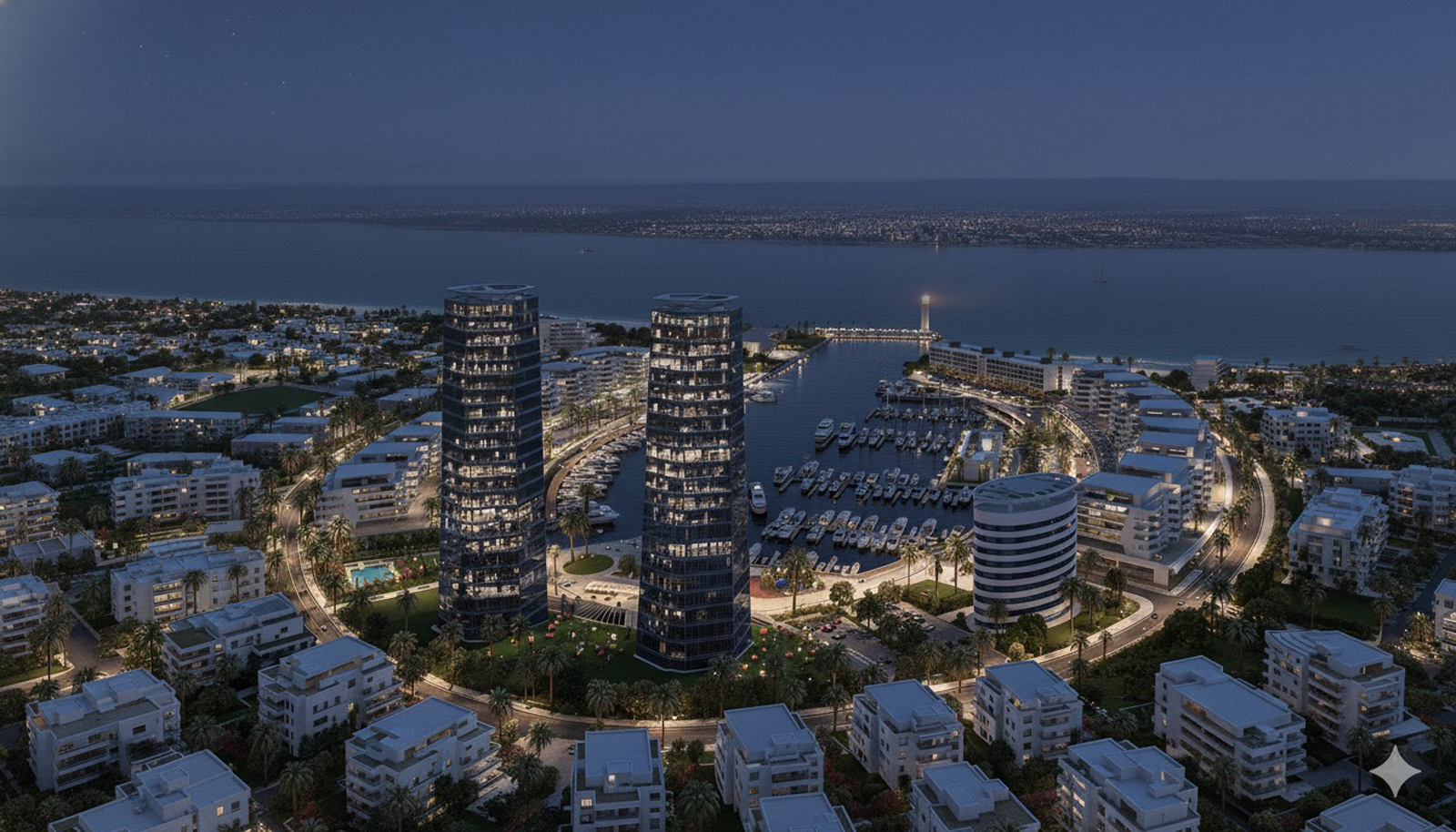
Marinas of Punta Piedra (2017–2021), Uruguay

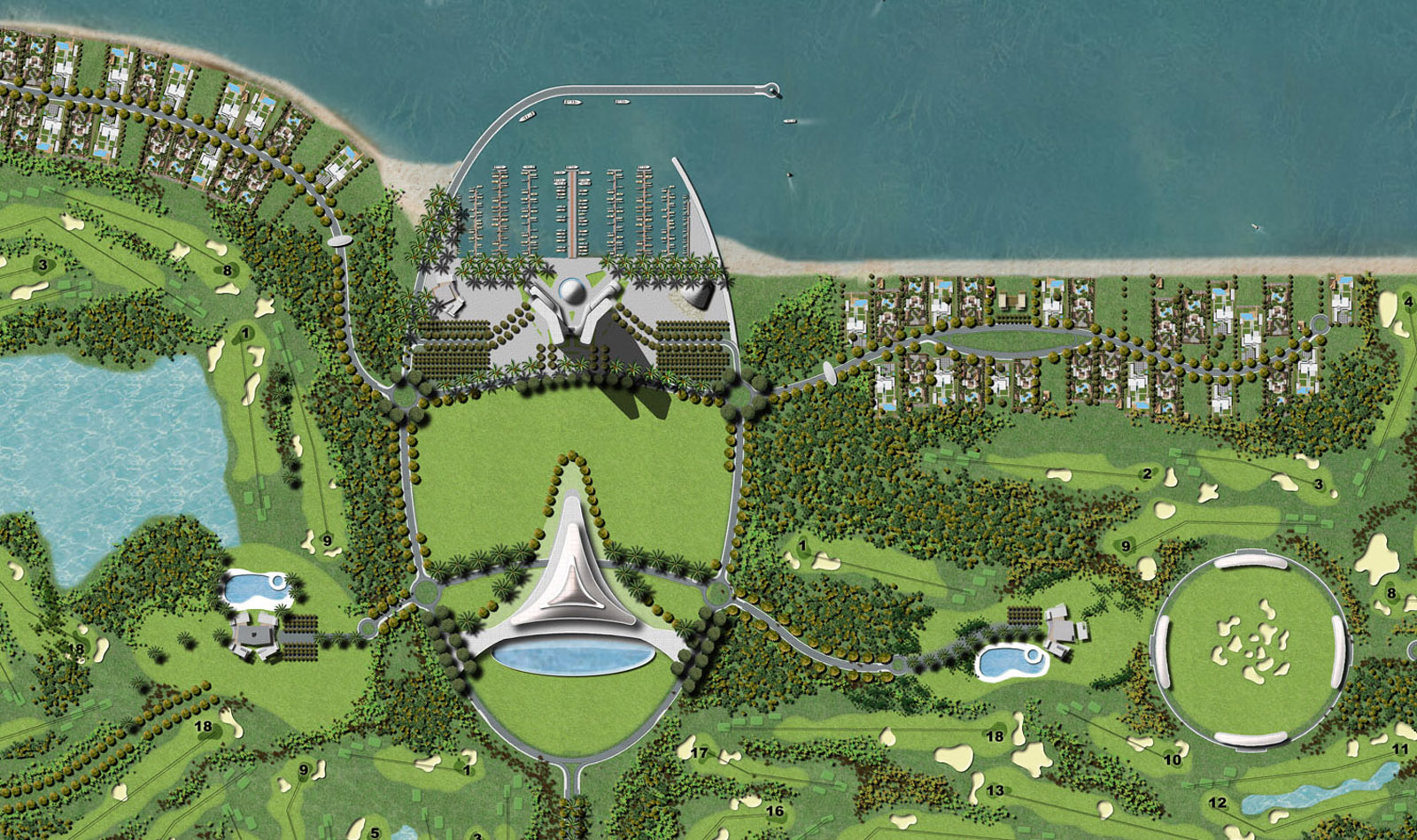
Adriatic Casino & Resort (2011–2012), Albania

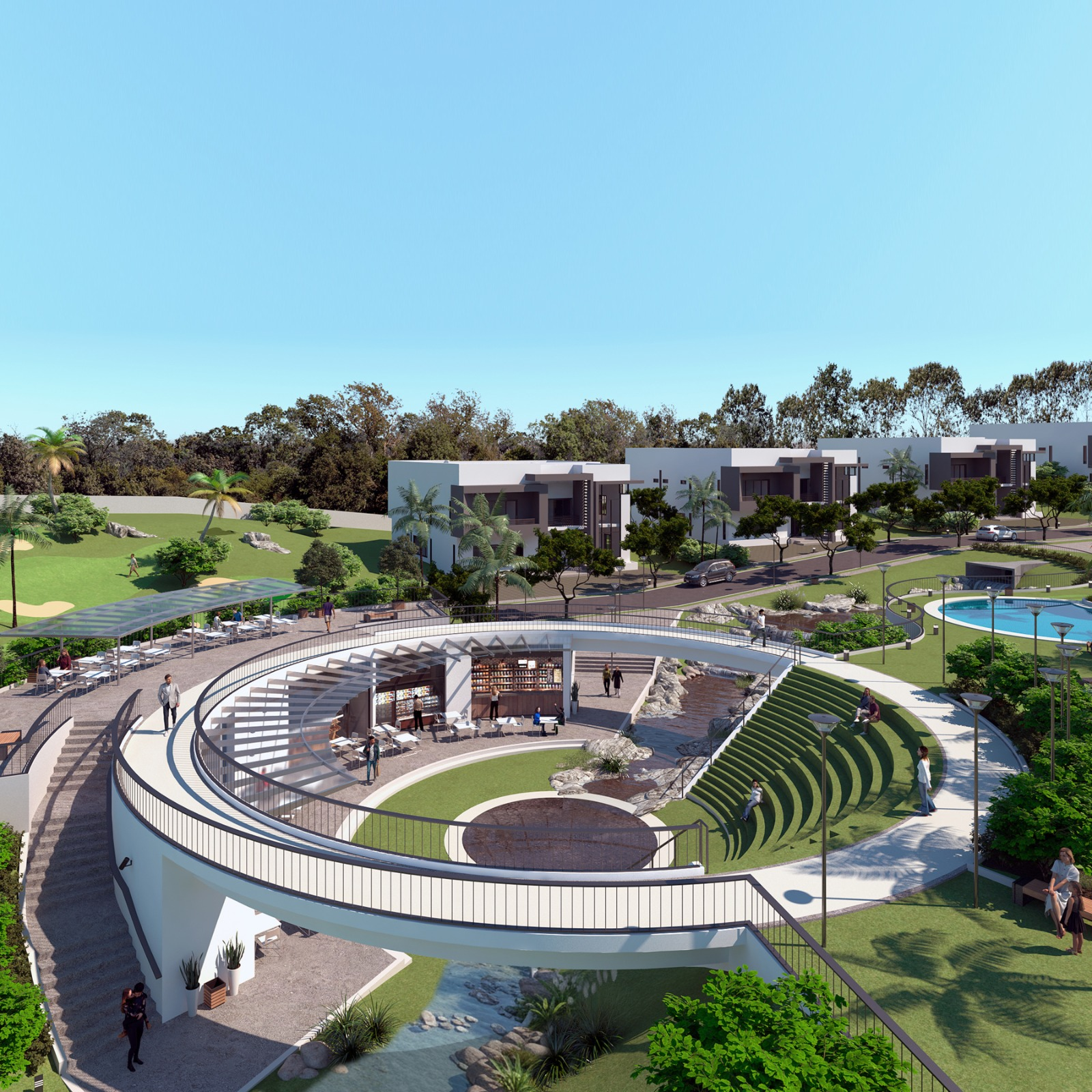
Club House & Amphitheatre (2020), Abuja, Nigeria

== Sports career ==
Rodríguez Pons has participated in competitive windsurfing since the 1980s. He represented Argentina in world championships in multiple sailing and windsurfing classes.

- Gold Medal, 1990 Windsurf World Championship (Division II Lightweight), Buenos Aires.
- Competed in world championship events in Italy, Israel, Spain, Poland and Argentina between 1986 and 2025.
- Ranked within the top ten in different categories during multiple seasons.
