= Jaufre de Pons =

Jaufre de Pons or Pon (French: Geoffroy or Geoffroi, Occitan: Jaufré, modern English: Geoffrey) was a 13th-century knight and troubadour from the castle of Pons in the March of Poitou in the Saintonge. He composed tensos with his castellan, Rainaut de Pons. There is joint vida of Jaufre and Rainaut. Only two of his tensos survive and only one that has survived is with Rainaut ("Seign'en Jaufre, respondetz mi, si·us platz"). The other is a partimen with Guiraut Riquier ("Guiraut Riquier, diatz me," composed probably 1270 or 1280–1). Jaufre's part in the debate consists in asking plain youthful questions about love only to receive the bitter and experienced answers of Guiraut in proverbial form.

Jaufre was probably the husband of Isabeau, daughter of Henry II of Rodez, a patron of troubadours. In 1292 he rendered homage to the lord of Châteauroux.

Some scholars have suspected that there were more than one Jaufre de Pons (one from the Saintonge and another from the Toulousain). One Jaufre has been placed as early as 1200–1220. There were several Jaufres who were lords of Pons, so identifying the troubadour among them or their relatives is difficult based on the slender documentation.

== Sources ==
- Chabaneau, Camille. Les Troubadours Renaud et Geoffroy de Pons. Paris: Maisonneuve, 1881.
- Egan, Margarita, ed. and trans. The Vidas of the Troubadours. New York: Garland, 1984. ISBN 0-8240-9437-9.
- Pfeffer, Wendy. Proverbs in Medieval Occitan Literature. University Press of Florida, 1997. ISBN 0-8130-1480-8.
- Rochegude, Henri Pascal de. Le Parnasse occitanien, ou Choix de poésies originales des troubadours. Benichet, 1819. See page 384 for Jaufre's vida in Occitan.
