= Keep of Pons =

Historic Keep in Pons, France

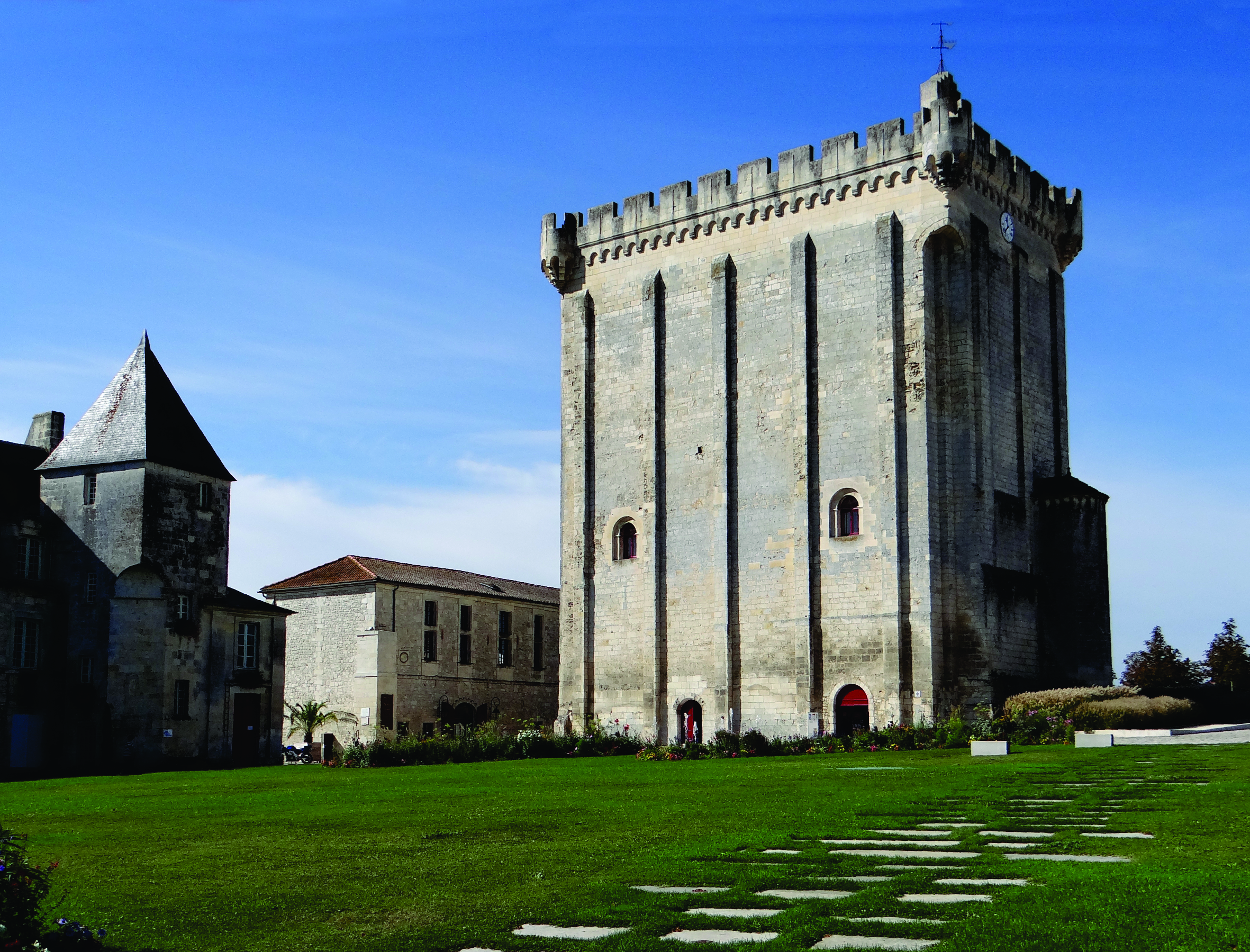
- The keep of Pons (South face)

- Location within France
- 45°34′41.52″N 0°32′51″E
- Type: Ancient Roman keep
- Cultures: Roman Empire
- Location: Pons, Nouvelle-Aquitaine, Charente-Maritime, France
- Region: Saintonge (historical)

History
- Built: 1187

Site notes
- Height: 33 m (108 ft)
- Length: 26.54 m (87.1 ft)
- Width: 15.25 m (50.0 ft)
- Public access: Open to the public
- Website: http://www.pons-tourisme.fr/visites

Designations
- Designation: Classified as Monument historique in 1879 & 1992

The Keep of Pons (French: Donjon de Pons) is an 830-year-old fortified tower located in Pons, France and is one of the few remnants of the original castle of Pons. The keep is located near the chapel and porch of Saint Gilles and remains of the ramparts. On a hill and visible from a distance, this 33-meter-high (108 ft) edifice is used as the symbol of the city.

== History ==
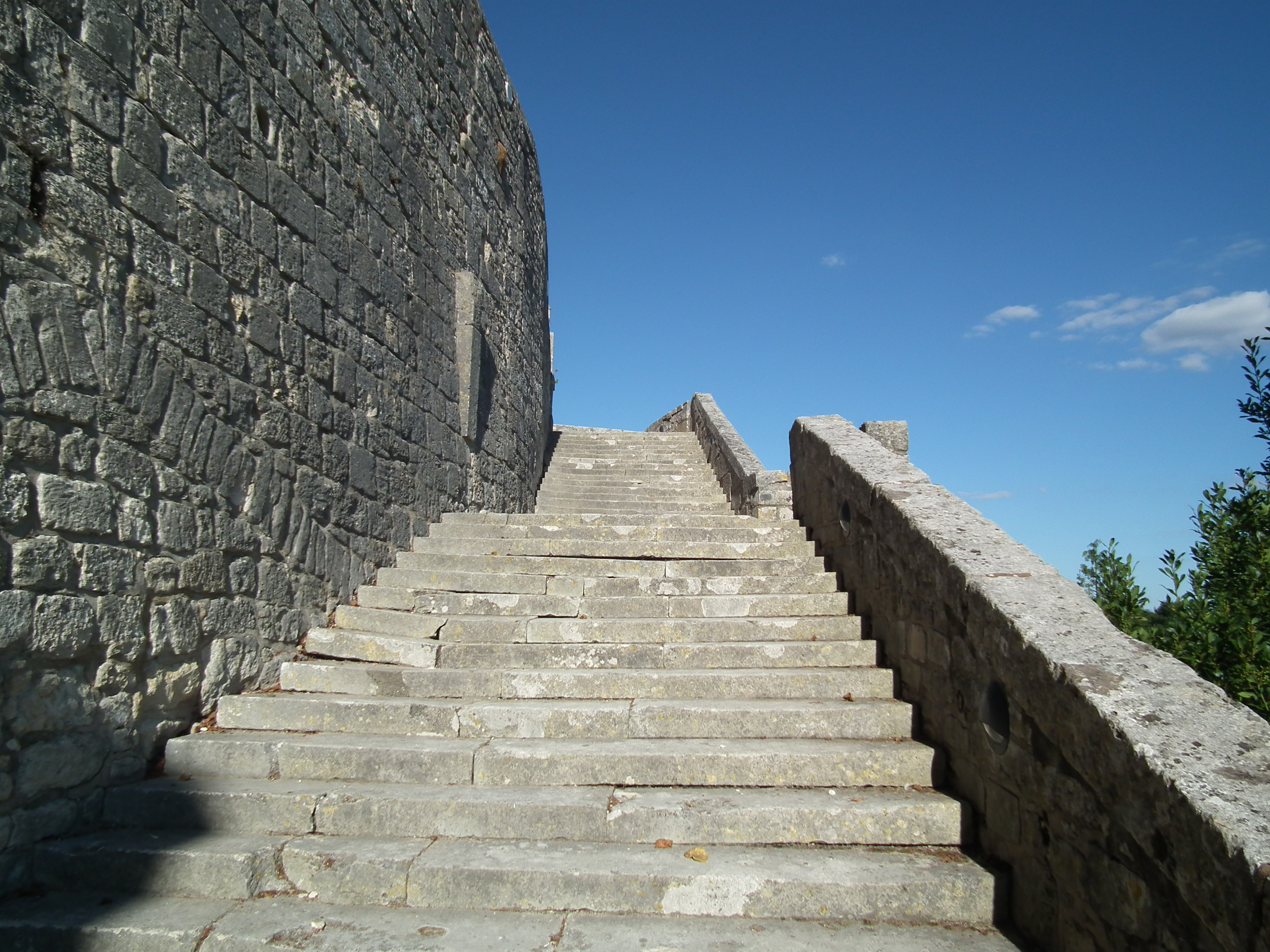
The grand staircase or Grand Escalier of Pons connecting the lower city to the château terrace

Built on the site of an oppidum, the castle of Pons was an important medieval stronghold due to its location as a hub of roads including those for the pilgrims of Saint James. The location and relatively high and defensible elevation made the Pons castrum a particularly coveted fortress. It belonged to the lord of Aulnay, Charente-Maritime, to the dukes of Aquitaine, then to the lords of Pons. The original keep was at destroyed in 1136 by the Count of Poitou.

Razed in 1179 by the Duke of Aquitaine, Richard Lionheart, following a revolt of his vassal, the castle was rebuilt in 1187 by Geoffroy III de Pons with the addition of the imposing quadrangular Keep of Pons, partially over of the foundations of the original, smaller keep and partially over new foundations. Based on the chapel facade, it is believed that the chapel was also rebuilt during this period.

The castle was again destroyed in 1622 (with the exception of the keep and some defensive elements) by the armies of Louis XIII following the siege of 1621. A few years later, Marshal Caesar Phoebus d'Albret had the current main building erected. Despite its cold appearance, several rooms within the Keep have comfortable interior with wooden ceilings and mounted canvas decorated with allegorical figures. The base of the ramparts has been partially preserved, and forms a walk from which one can enjoy a panoramic view of the Seugne valley. Caesar Phoebus d'Albret, Sire de Pons, ordered the construction of the monumental staircase which connects the upper city to the lower city.

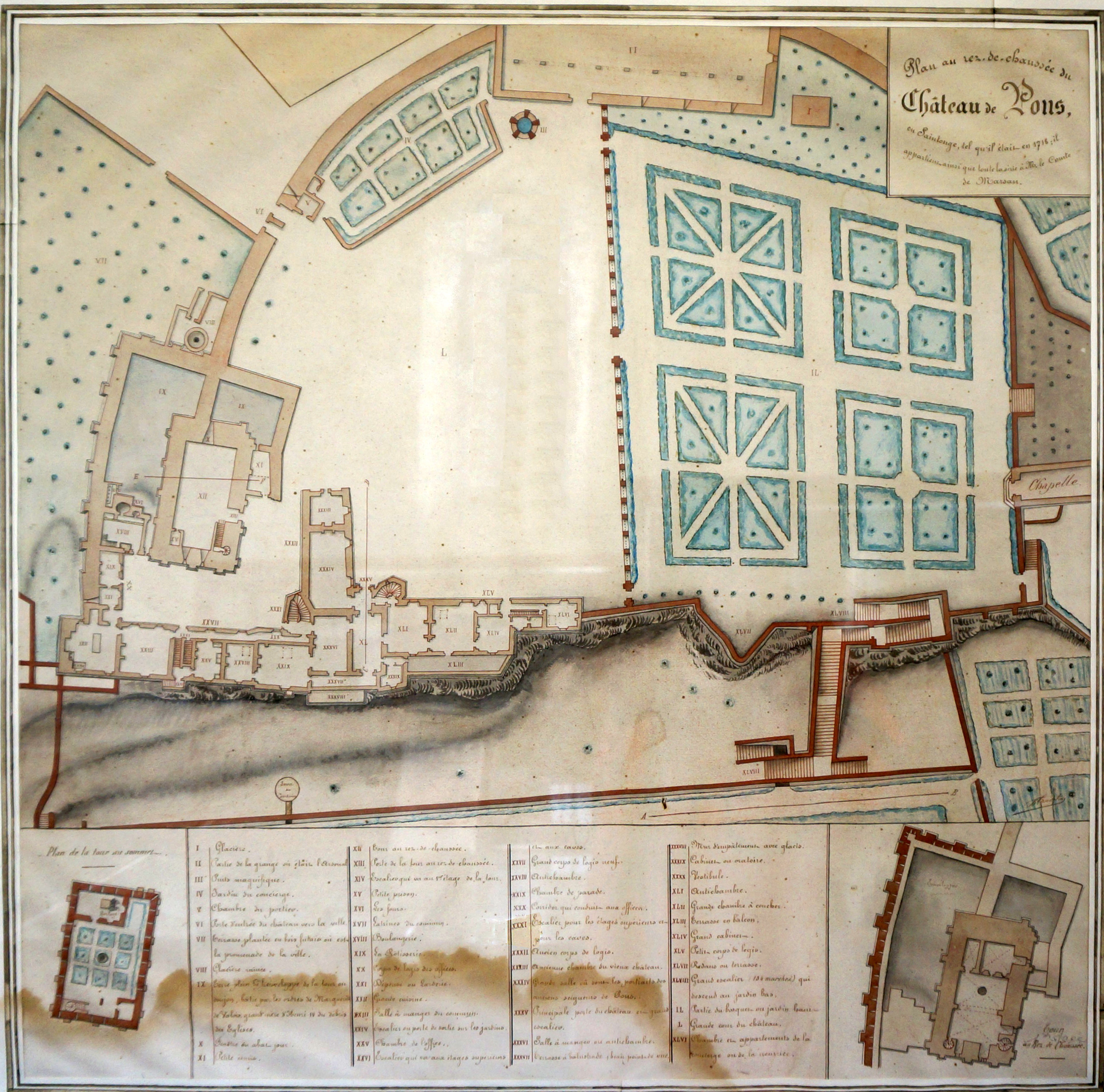
Plans of Marsan from 1718 in the Pons municipal museum

The buildings and vestiges of the medieval castle were bought in 1806 by the municipality. Only the Castral Chapel and the Saint-Gilles porch, the Keep and the ramparts on the cliffs are the remains of the medieval fortress. The municipality set up the esplanade in the public garden and repurposed the main building as the town hall. The keep was classified as a national heritage site (monument historique) in 1879.

The facades and roofs of the Town Hall, as well as the arches serving as the base of the building were designated as monuments in 1991. The two painted ceilings of the 17th century, the first located on the ground floor of the South Tower, the second in the great hall of the ground floor were also designated national heritage pieces the following year (1992). Archaeology digs continue to reveal more information about the approximate size of the original castle as well as additional structures that were once present.

== Architecture ==
=== Keep ===
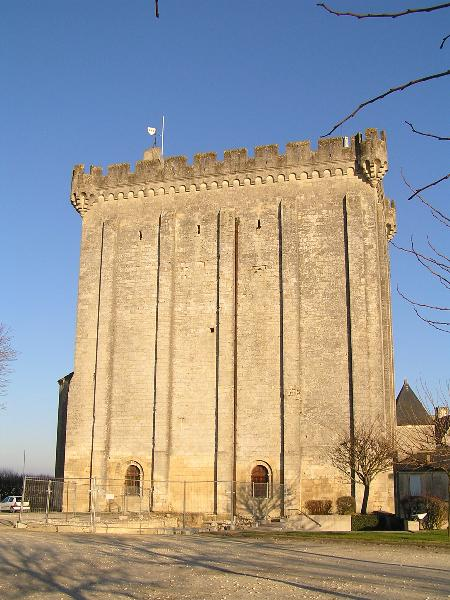
West facade of the Keep of Pons

The Keep of Pons is a model of a Romanesque palace keep in western France. Its stone walls have a thickness of 2.5 meters on three of its sides and 4.40 meters thick on the north side. From a height of 33 meters it has a base of 26.45 meters by 15.25 meters. The interior had three levels.

Until 1904, the keep was crowned with an entablature pierced with battlements. In 1904, Émile Combes added fancy machicolation and telescopic corner watchtowers equipped with loopholes, based on an engraving found at the Keep of Tonnay-Boutonne. The works were financed by the sale of a chimney that is now at Château d'Usson. Originally, the entrance to the Keep, located on the north face, allowed access to the first floor using a wooden staircase. As with the Tower of London keep, the staircase could be destroyed or dismounted in case of an attack. Today access is via a stone spiral staircase.

The first floor has a vast room, lit up on the south side by two paired windows enclosed by two semicircular openings. All other openings were later drilled into the walls according to the uses of the building. A narrow spiral staircases housed in the thickness of the walls allows for movements within the keep. The view from the terrace of the building extends over the entire city and the wide valley of the Seugne.

=== Main building ===
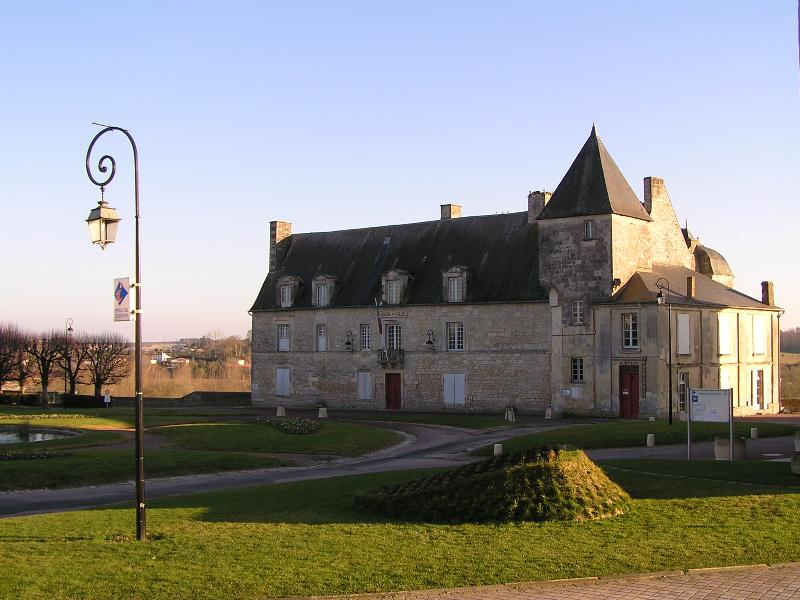
Pons city hall

The long feudal dynasty of the Lords of Pons ended in 1586 with Antoine, the last male heir. By the marriage of his daughter Antoinette, the lordship passed to a collateral line of Albret. Starting in 1630, Henri the first of Albret built a long and banal manor, in line with the feudal ruins and the old rampart. In 1652, César Phébus d'Albret, heir to the third generation, modified the manor by extending the building into a larger, two-story structure on vaulted cellars. However, in 1816, the poorly maintained central part of the manor was demolished.

The south facade of the manor advances over the cliff through an arcade gallery, a creation of Marie d'Albret, the daughter of César Phébus d'Albret, and completed after 1660. From the public garden terrace, there remains the visible foundations of the medieval castle.

Two ceilings of the building are classified as historical monuments. The first, called "Oratory", located in a small room on the ground floor of the square tower, is decorated with allegorical paintings, framed by wooden moldings. The central panel, circular, shows Venus on a chariot pulled by doves. On the corner panels are represented cherubs. The second, located in a lower room of the central part, is a wooden ceiling, consisting of Louis XIII style molded panels.

== Garden of Pons Castle ==
The public garden was first developed in 1665 in the square of the old fortress, after having been leveled and cleared of the old military material. The garden was inspired by Le Nôtre and a watercolor of 1714 shows the layout of the garden with the squares of the parterres cut diagonally by alleys. Towards the end of the 19th century, a large fountain was added and the garden was redone, this time without any reference to the classical period. An urban park was planted on terraces on the old ramparts and offers scenic views over the meandering valley of the Seugne.

Two monuments give access to the upper public garden on the terraces, the spiral staircase of an old turret defense, which is a remnant of the castle destroyed in 1622, and the Grand Escalier (great staircase) of César Phoebus d'Albret, which was designed in 1665. The latter has five flights punctuated by six levels and connects the upper gardens to those made at the foot of the ramparts and the Seugne. It allows visitors to see the ancient medieval wall of the twelfth century and the terrace built in 1630 on the cliff. These 17th century stairs, were built by Lord of Pons, Pierre Dugua following his return from his renown explorations and settlements in New France (modern-day Canada).

At the end other end of the public garden stands the Saint-Gilles chapel of the castle and the reconstructed facade of a Renaissance house. The Porte Saint-Gilles which constituted the entrance of the castle is located under the chapel.

== Visits ==
The Romanesque collection is open to the public and includes the keep, the Saint-Gilles gate, the Saint-Gilles chapel (which houses an archaeological museum), the pilgrim hospital and its medicinal garden, the Saint-Vivien church, and the nearby houses. The site also hosts conferences and exhibitions of historical significance.

== See also ==
- List of castles in France
