= Bonne de Pons d'Heudicourt =

Mistress to Louis XIV (1644–1709)

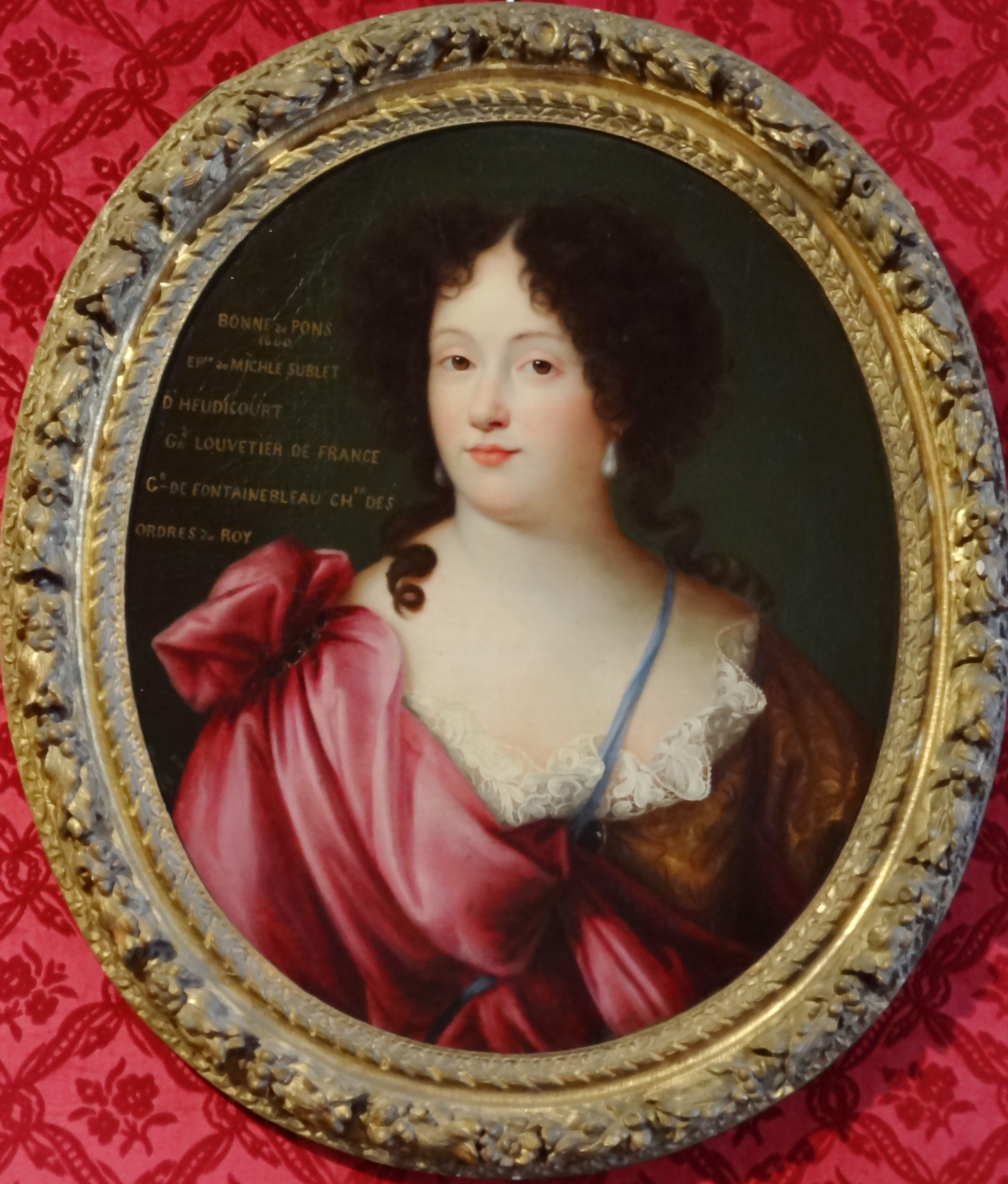
- Born: 1641
- Died: 24 January 1709 (aged 67–68)
- Spouse: Michel III de Sublet
- Parents: Pons de Pons (father); Elisabeth de Puyrigauld (mother)

Bonne de Pons d'Heudicourt (1641 – 24 January 1709), was a French courtier, known as the royal mistress of Louis XIV of France. She was known as La Grande Louve ('Grand She-Wolf') after her husband, who was the king's official Master of the Wolf Hunt.

== Life ==
=== Early life ===
Bonne de Pons was born in Poitiou as the daughter of the Huguenot aristocrats Pons de Pons and Elisabeth de Puyrigauld. She was the sister of Renaud de Pons, comte de Bourg-Charente, the niece of César Phoebus d'Albret, Count of Miossens, and a cousin by marriage to Madame de Montespan.

She was originally a Protestant Huguenot, but converted to Catholicism together with her sister Marie-Élisabeth at the request of their uncle César Phoebus d'Albret, Count of Miossens, as this act would make it easier to arrange high status marriage for them. Her sister married, but her uncle used his connections to secure a position for her at court because of her beauty. Protected by her uncle, she was given the support of the king's brother, the Duke of Orleans, and appointed lady-in-waiting (fille d'honneur) to the queen, in 1661.

=== Affair with Louis XIV ===
At court, she became involved in an affair with Louis XIV. This was during the king's affair with Louise de La Vallière. The affair was a minor and temporary one and she did not become an official mistress. Upon hearing of the affair, her uncle had her removed from court, officially to tend to his health. She spent the following years as her uncle's hostess in his residence Hotel d'Albret in Paris. There, she made the acquaintance of Madame de Maintenon. Saint-Simon describe her in her memoirs and noted the rumour that she was the mistress of her uncle.

In 1666, her uncle arranged for her to marry the courtier Michel III de Sublet, Marquis d'Heudicourt (d. 1718), the king's official Grand Lovetier de France ('Master of the Wolf Hunt'). She had four children during her marriage; Louise, Pons Auguste and Armand Gaston.

In 1668, she was allowed back to court in capacity of her marriage to a court official, but the relationship with the king was not resumed, as he had by that time become the lover of her cousin Madame de Montespan.

=== Exile and later life ===
As the cousin of Madame de Montespan, the king's mistress, and the personal friend of Madame de Maintenon, she was well aware of the king's secret illegitimate children with Montespan, who were taken care of by Maintenon. In 1672, she revealed the existence of the secret illegitimate children of the king and Madame de Montespan in her correspondence with her lover, Monsieur de Béthune, as well as to the Polish ambassador and Marquis de Rochefort. This resulted in her being banished from court and exiled to her spouse's castle d'Hedicourt in Normandy.

She was allowed to return in 1676 on the request of Madame de Maintenon. At her return, she was described by Saint-Simon as no longer beautiful and with difficulty in walking, but as still witty and charming. She resumed her friendship with Madame de Maintenon, who acted as her protector at court, and kept attending court until her death.
