= Geoffroy III de Pons =

12th-century French noble

Geoffroy III de Pons, Lord of Pons, was a 12th-century French noble.

== Life ==
Geoffroy was a son of Pons de Pons and Gervaise de Craon. In 1160, Geoffroy founded the Hôpital des Pèlerins (Pilgrims' Hospital), outside the walls of Pons, to replace an older hospital that was too small, to host the growing numbers of pilgrims on their way along the Way of St. James to the Santiago de Compostela Cathedral in Spain. The hospital was originally run by the Knights Templar.

During a revolt with Count of Angoulême and Hugh IX of Lusignan and Geoffrey de Rancon, Lord of Taillebourg against King Henry II of England, their vassal as the Duke of Aquitaine, the Castle of Pons is destroyed by Richard Lionheart in 1179. Geoffroy was able to recover his lands and obtain permission to build a new castle in 1180.

He died in 1191, and was buried in St-Vivien Church, Pons, France.

== Marriage and issue ==
Geoffroy married Agnès de Matha, daughter of Geoffroy Martel de Matha, and Philippa de Sablé and are known to have had the following known children:

- Renaud II de Pons, married Marguerite de Périgord, had issue.
- Geoffroy de Pons, Lord of Asnières, who is alleged to be the ancestor of the Marquis of Asnières La Chataigneraye.
