= Pons, Charente-Maritime =

Pons
- Commune
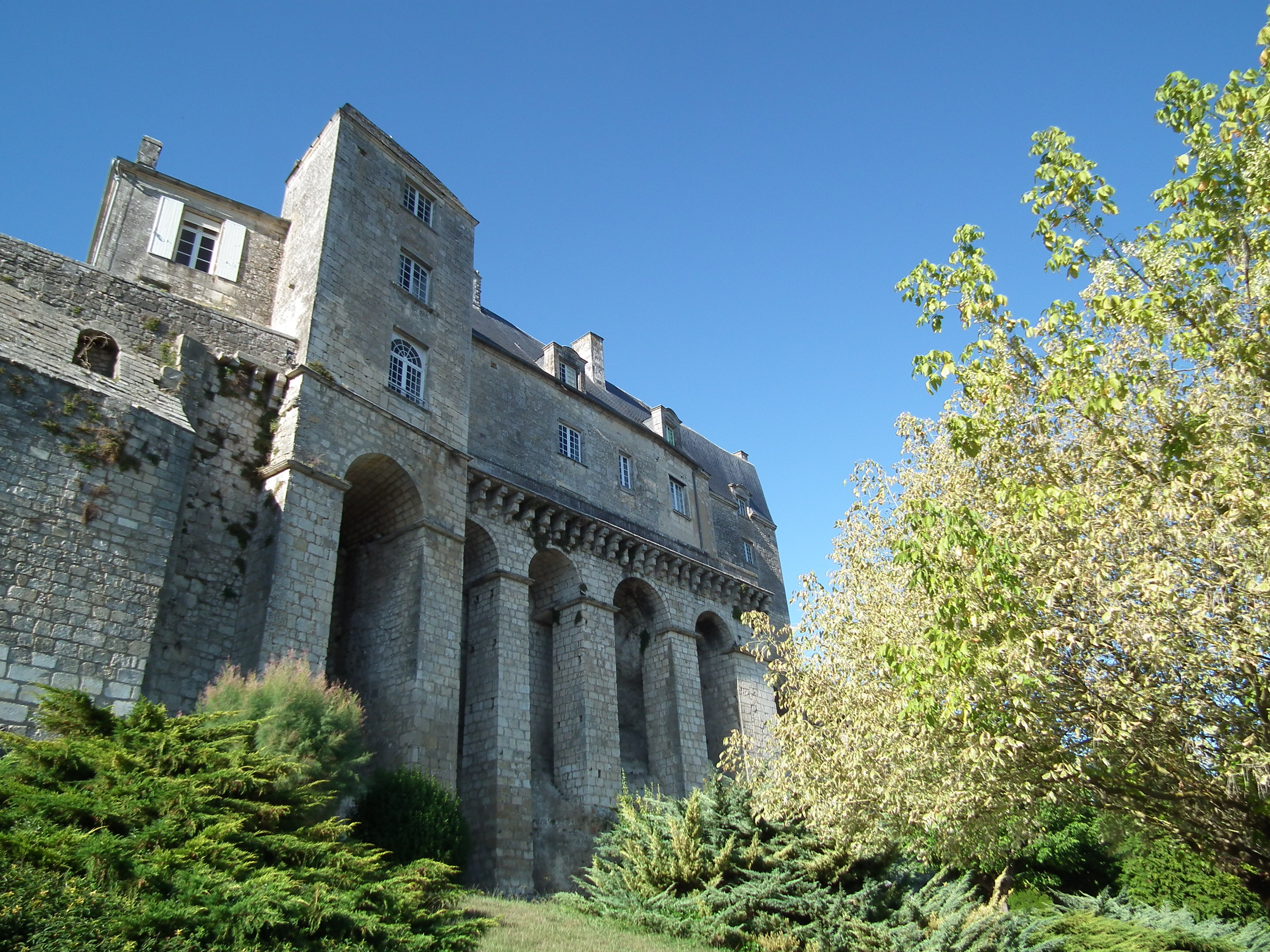
- The Castle

- Coat of arms
- Location of Pons
- Location within France Location within Nouvelle-Aquitaine
- Coordinates: 45°34′52″N 0°32′49″W
- Country: France
- Region: Nouvelle-Aquitaine
- Department: Charente-Maritime
- Arrondissement: Jonzac
- Canton: Pons

Government
  - Mayor (2020–2026): Jacky Botton
- Area^{1}: 27.63 km^{2} (10.67 sq mi)
- Highest elevation: 63 m (207 ft)
- Lowest elevation: 8 m (26 ft)
- Population (2023): 4,343
  - Density: 157.2/km^{2} (407.1/sq mi)
- Time zone: UTC+01:00 (CET)
  - Summer (DST): UTC+02:00 (CEST)
- INSEE/Postal code: 17283 /17800
- ^{1} French Land Register data, which excludes lakes, ponds, glaciers > 1 km^{2} (0.386 sq mi or 247 acres) and river estuaries.

Pons (French pronunciation: [pɔ̃]) is a commune in the Charente-Maritime department in southwestern France. The city is known for its numerous national historic monuments dating from the 12th century onward. One of the most well known is the 33 m Keep of Pons, which is the official symbol of the city.

== Geography ==
The Seugne flows north through the middle of the city and crosses it.

== Population ==
Historical population

Year	Pop.	±% p.a.
1793	4,031	—
1800	3,803	−0.83%
1806	3,429	−1.71%
1821	3,605	+0.33%
1831	3,726	+0.33%
1836	4,294	+2.88%
1841	4,543	+1.13%
1846	4,661	+0.51%
1851	4,765	+0.44%
1856	4,757	−0.03%
1861	4,894	+0.57%
1866	4,969	+0.30%
1872	4,738	−0.79%
1876	4,881	+0.75%
1881	4,895	+0.06%
1886	4,764	−0.54%
1891	4,615	−0.63%
1896	4,717	+0.44%
1901	4,772	+0.23%

Year	Pop.	±% p.a.
1906	4,470	−1.30%
1911	4,549	+0.35%
1921	4,368	−0.41%
1926	4,427	+0.27%
1931	4,375	−0.24%
1936	4,266	−0.50%
1946	4,442	+0.41%
1954	4,629	+0.52%
1962	4,753	+0.33%
1968	4,824	+0.25%
1975	4,878	+0.16%
1982	4,861	−0.05%
1990	4,412	−1.20%
1999	4,427	+0.04%
2007	4,442	+0.04%
2012	4,144	−1.38%
2017	4,182	+0.18%
2023	4,343	+0.63%

Source: EHESS and INSEE (1968-2023)

== Gallery ==
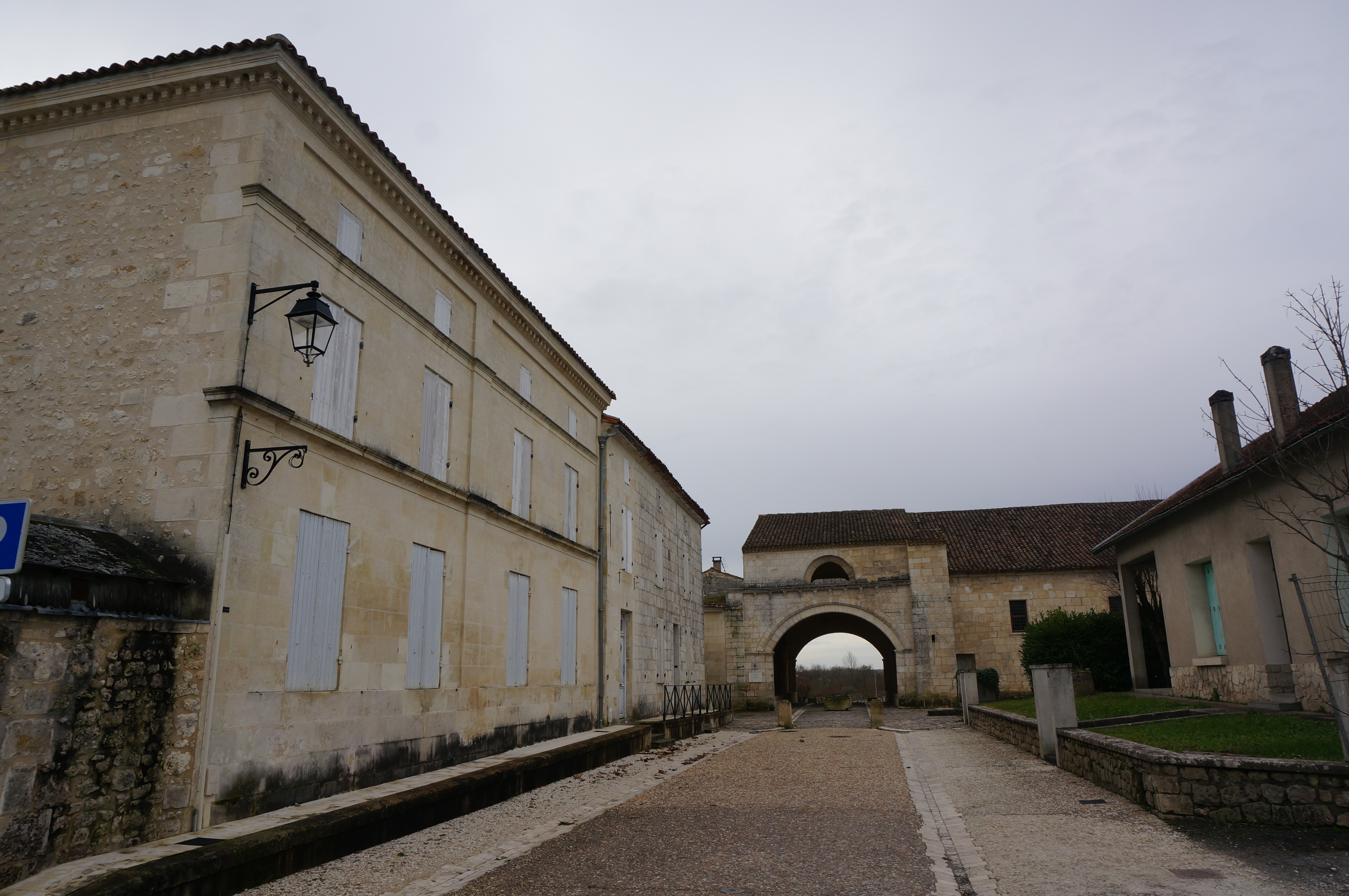
Pilgrim hospital, via Turonensis, World Heritage, way of st-James.

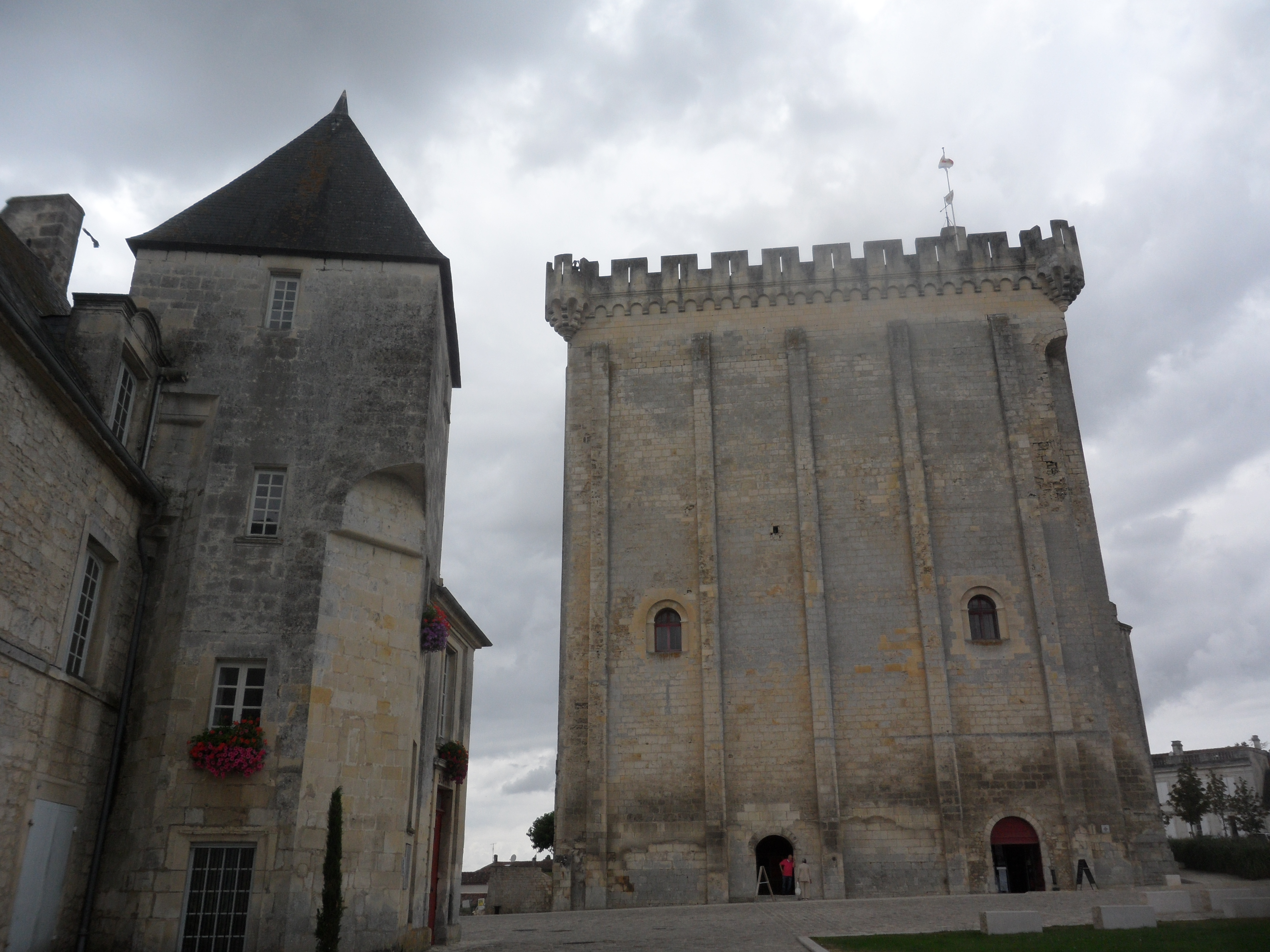
Keep.

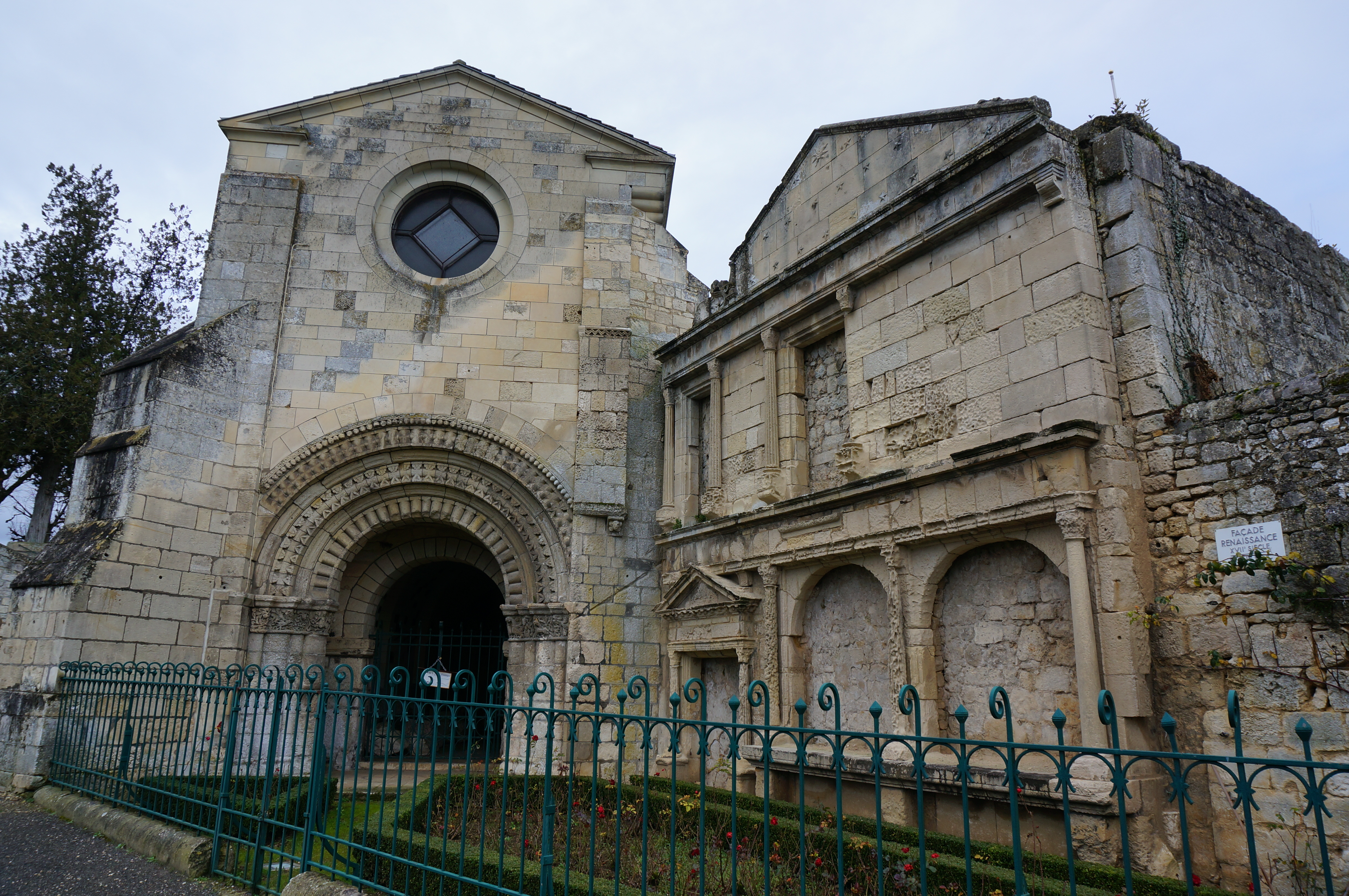
Museum.

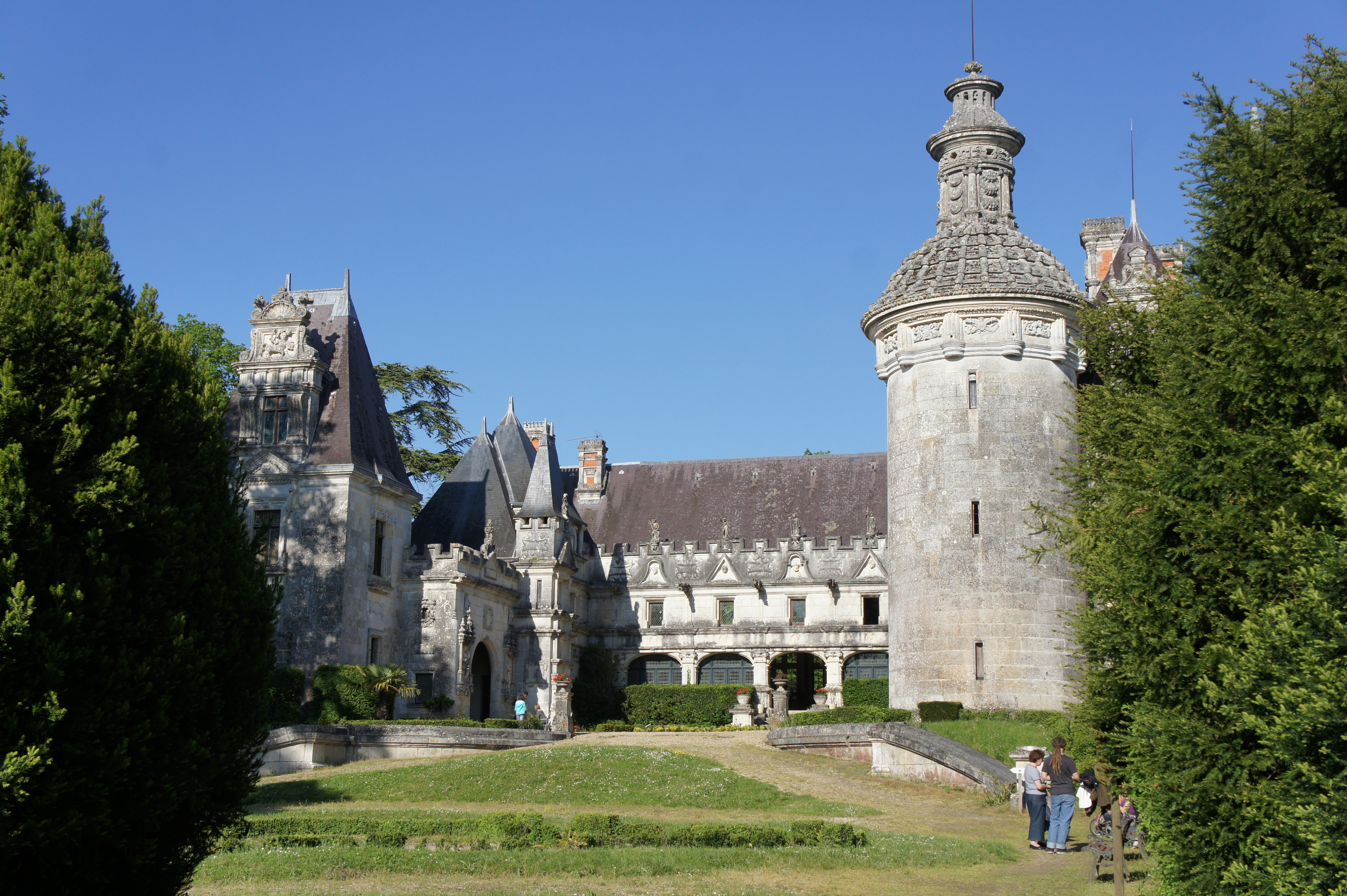
Château d'Usson, a medieval theme-park for children

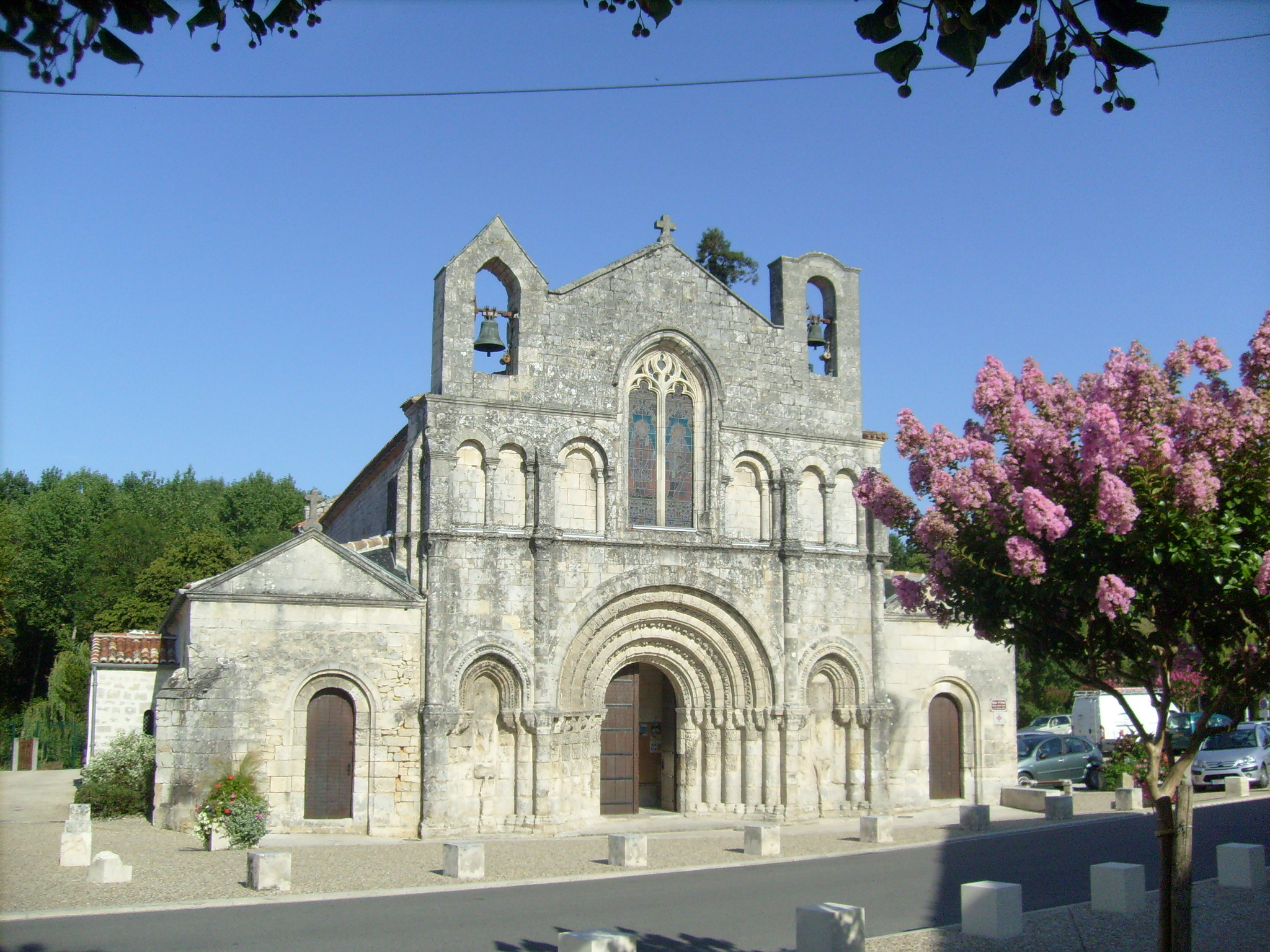
church.

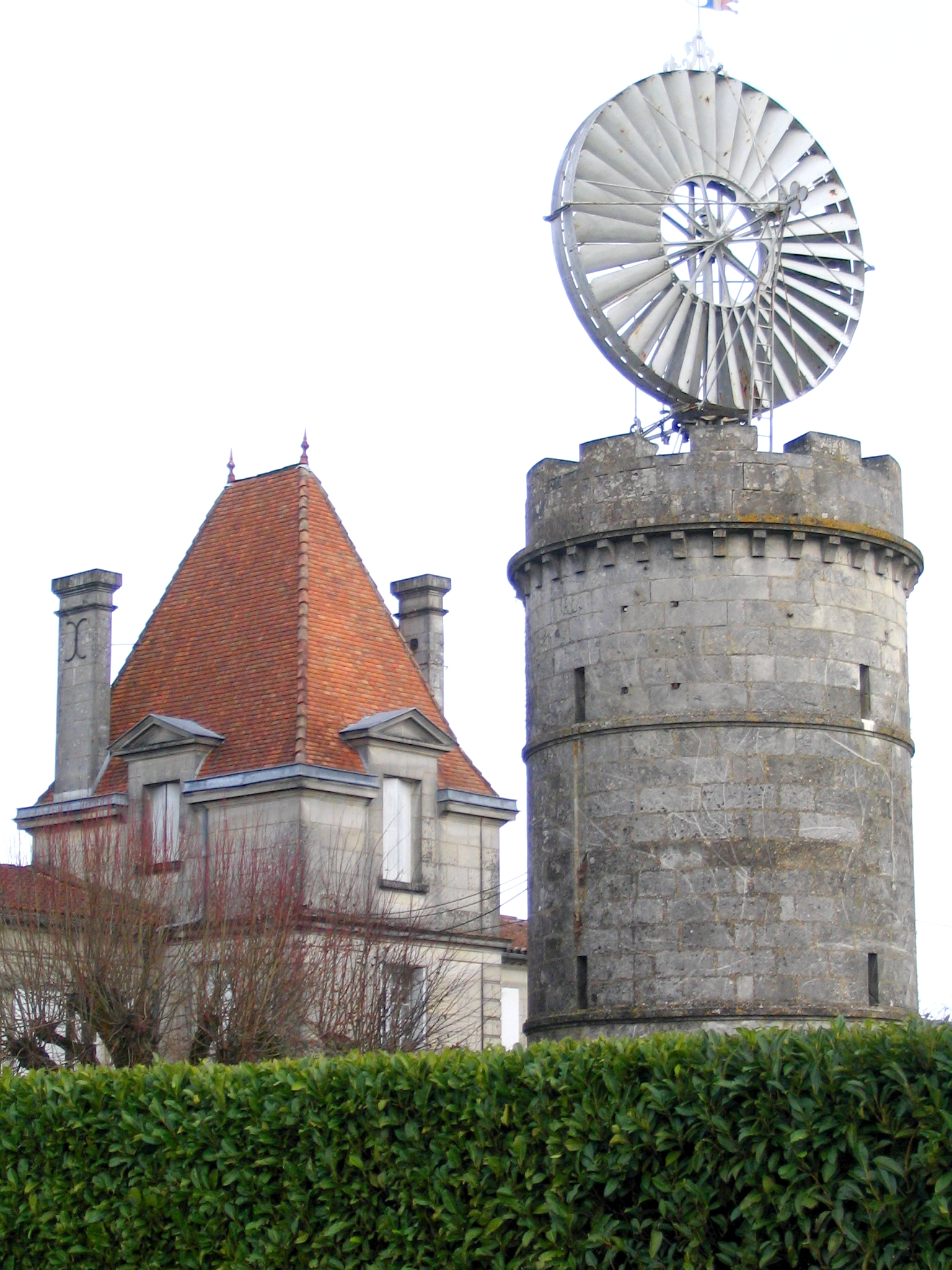
Éolienne Bollée.

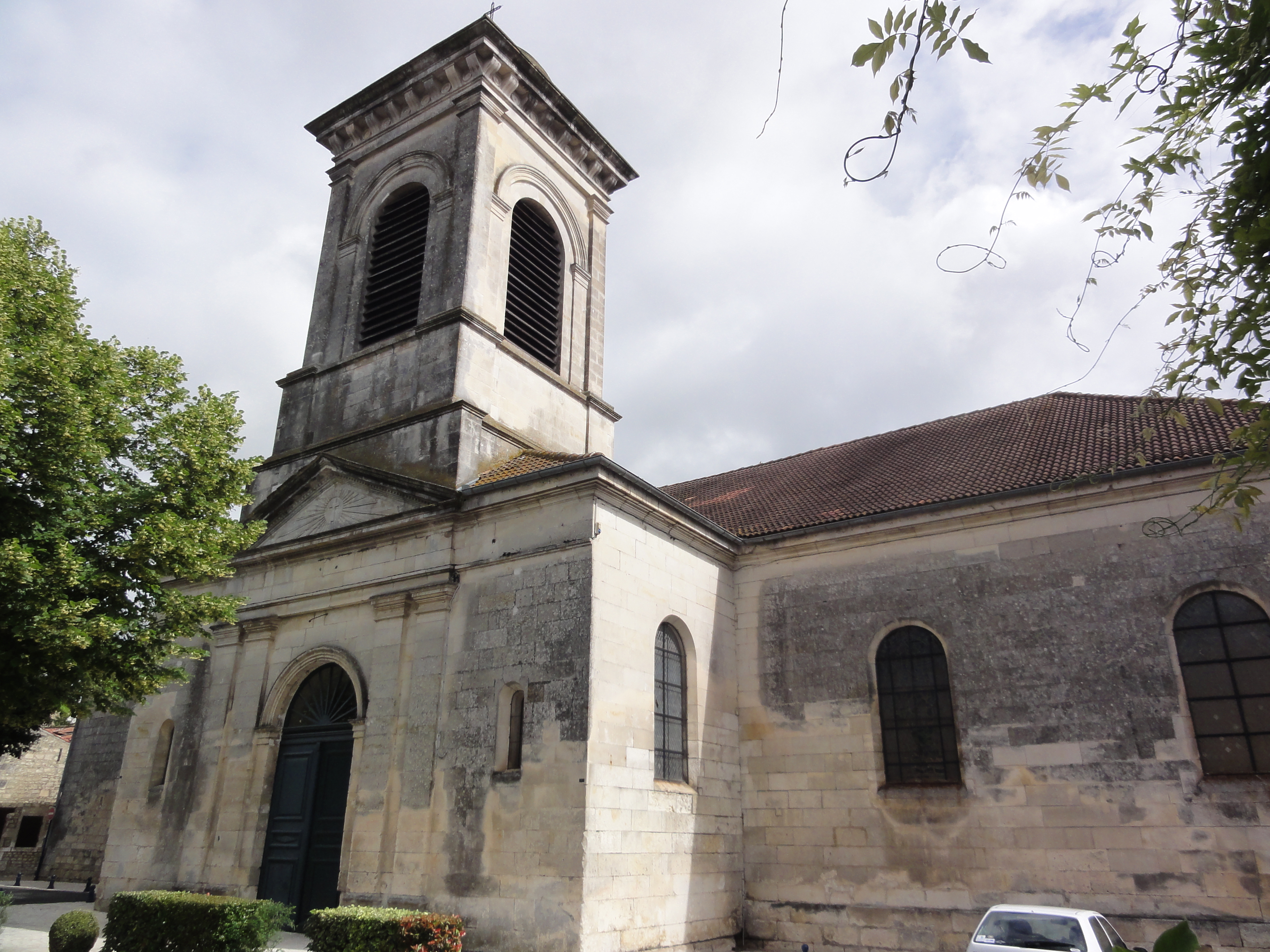
Church.

== See also ==
- Communes of the Charente-Maritime department
