= List of years in poetry =

This article gives a chronological list of years in poetry. These pages supplement the List of years in literature pages with a focus on events in the history of poetry.

== Before 1000 BC ==
- c. 26th century BC – Kesh Temple Hymn
- c. 23rd century BC – Enheduanna, The Exaltation of Inanna and the Temple Hymns
- c. 1500 BC – Earliest possible date for composition of the "family poems" in the Rig Veda
- 11th century BC – earliest works in the Classic of Poetry

== First millennium BC ==
- 7th century BC in poetry
- 6th century BC in poetry
- 5th century BC in poetry
- 4th century BC in poetry
- 3rd century BC in poetry
- 2nd century BC in poetry
- 1st century BC in poetry

== First millennium AD ==
- 1st century in poetry
- 2nd century in poetry
- 3rd century in poetry
- 4th century in poetry
- 5th century in poetry
  - 451 – Jacob of Serugh born (died November 521), writing in Syriac
  - 455 – Blossius Aemilius Dracontius born about this year (died c. 505) of Carthage, a Latin poet
  - 474 – Magnus Felix Ennodius (died July 17, 521), Bishop of Pavia and poet, writing in Latin
- 6th century in poetry
  - 500 – Procopius born about this year (died 565)
  - 505 – Blossius Aemilius Dracontius born about this year (born 455) of Carthage, a Latin poet
  - 521 – Jacob of Serugh (451–521), writing in Syriac
  - 521 – Magnus Felix Ennodius (474 – July 17, 521), Bishop of Pavia and poet, writing in Latin
  - 530 – Venantius Fortunatus born (c. 530 – c. 600), Latin poet and hymnodist from Northern Italy
  - 534 – Taliesin born about this year (died c. 599), the earliest identified Welsh poet
  - 536 – Agathias born about this year (died 582/594); Ancient Greek poet and historian
  - 539 – Chilperic I born (died September 584) Frankish king of Neustria and a Latin poet
  - 543 – Saint Columbanus (died 615), Hiberno-Latin poet and writer
  - 544 – Arator declaims his poem De Actibus Apostolorum in the Church of San Pietro-in-Vinculi
  - 554 – 'Abid ibn al-Abris died about this year; Arabic poet
  - 560 – Labīd born this year (died 661); Arabic poet
  - 560 – Samaw'al ibn 'Adiya died about this year; Jewish poet writing in Arabic
  - 565 – Procopius died (born about 500)
  - 570 – Maymun Ibn Qays Al-a'sha born (died 625)
  - 580 – Antara Ibn Shaddad died about this year; Arabic poet
  - 584 – Amr ibn Kulthum died about this year; Arabic poet
  - 584 – Chilperic I died (born 539) Frankish king of Neustria and a Latin poet
  - 599 – Taliesin died about this year (born c. 534), the earliest identified Welsh poet
- 7th century in poetry
  - 600 – Venantius Fortunatus born (c. 530 – c. 600), Latin poet and hymnodist from Northern Italy
  - 615 – Saint Columbanus (born 543), Hiberno-Latin poet and writer
  - 625 – Maymun Ibn Qays Al-a'sha born (died 625)
  - 661 – Labīd died this year (born 560); Arabic poet
- 8th century in poetry
- 9th century in poetry
  - 800s
  - 810s
  - 820s
  - 830s
  - 840s
  - 850s
  - 860s
  - 870s
  - 880s
  - 890s

== 10th century ==
- 900s
- 910s
- 920s
- 930s
- 940s
- 950s
- 960s
- 970s
- 980s
- 990s

== 11th century ==
- 1000s
- 1010s
- 1020s
- 1030s
- 1040s
- 1050s
- 1060s
- 1070s
- 1080s
- 1090s

== 12th century ==
- 1100s
- 1110s
- 1120s
- 1130s
- 1140s
- 1150s
- 1160s
- 1170s
- 1180s
- 1190s

== 13th century ==
=== 1200s ===
- 1200 in poetry
- 1201 in poetry
- 1202 in poetry
- 1203 in poetry
- 1204 in poetry
- 1205 in poetry
- 1206 in poetry
- 1207 in poetry
- 1208 in poetry – Estimated date of the Gesta Danorum
- 1209 in poetry

=== 1210s ===
- 1210 in poetry – Birth of Saadi, Persian poet
- 1211 in poetry
- 1212 in poetry
- 1213 in poetry
- 1214 in poetry
- 1215 in poetry
- 1216 in poetry
- 1217 in poetry
- 1218 in poetry
- 1219 in poetry

=== 1220s ===
- 1220 in poetry
- 1221 in poetry
- 1222 in poetry
- 1223 in poetry
- 1224 in poetry
- 1225 in poetry
- 1226 in poetry
- 1227 in poetry
- 1228 in poetry
- 1229 in poetry

=== 1230s ===
- 1230 in poetry
- 1231 in poetry
- 1232 in poetry
- 1233 in poetry
- 1234 in poetry
- 1235 in poetry
- 1236 in poetry
- 1237 in poetry
- 1238 in poetry
- 1239 in poetry

=== 1240s ===
- 1240 in poetry
- 1241 in poetry
- 1242 in poetry
- 1243 in poetry
- 1244 in poetry
- 1245 in poetry
- 1246 in poetry
- 1247 in poetry
- 1248 in poetry
- 1249 in poetry

=== 1250s ===
- 1250 in poetry
- 1251 in poetry
- 1252 in poetry
- 1253 in poetry
- 1254 in poetry
- 1255 in poetry
- 1256 in poetry
- 1257 in poetry
- 1258 in poetry
- 1259 in poetry

=== 1260s ===
- 1260 in poetry
- 1261 in poetry
- 1262 in poetry
- 1263 in poetry
- 1264 in poetry
- 1265 in poetry
- 1266 in poetry
- 1267 in poetry
- 1268 in poetry
- 1269 in poetry

=== 1270s ===
- 1270 in poetry
- 1271 in poetry
- 1272 in poetry
- 1273 in poetry
- 1274 in poetry
- 1275 in poetry
- 1276 in poetry
- 1277 in poetry
- 1278 in poetry
- 1279 in poetry

=== 1280s ===
- 1280 in poetry
- 1281 in poetry
- 1282 in poetry
- 1283 in poetry
- 1284 in poetry
- 1285 in poetry
- 1286 in poetry
- 1287 in poetry – The Jewang Un'gi by Yi Seung-hyu
- 1288 in poetry
- 1289 in poetry

=== 1290s ===
- 1290 in poetry
- 1291 in poetry – Death of Saadi
- 1292 in poetry
- 1293 in poetry
- 1294 in poetry
- 1295 in poetry
- 1296 in poetry
- 1297 in poetry
- 1298 in poetry
- 1299 in poetry

== 14th century ==
- 1300s
- 1310s
- 1320s
- 1330s
- 1340s
- 1350s
- 1360s
- 1370s
- 1380s
- 1390s

== 15th century ==
- 1400s
- 1410s
- 1420s
- 1430s
- 1440s
- 1450s
- 1460s
- 1470s
- 1480s
- 1490s

== 16th century ==
=== 1500s ===
- 1500 in poetry – La Araucana - Alonso de Ercilla
- 1501 in poetry – Judita - Marko Marulić
- 1502 in poetry
- 1503 in poetry
- 1504 in poetry
- 1505 in poetry
- 1506 in poetry
- 1507 in poetry
- 1508 in poetry
- 1509 in poetry

=== 1510s ===
- 1510 in poetry
- 1511 in poetry
- 1512 in poetry
- 1513 in poetry
- 1514 in poetry
- 1515 in poetry
- 1516 in poetry
- 1517 in poetry
- 1518 in poetry
- 1519 in poetry

=== 1520s ===
- 1520 in poetry
- 1521 in poetry
- 1522 in poetry
- 1523 in poetry
- 1524 in poetry – Birth of Pierre de Ronsard
- 1525 in poetry
- 1526 in poetry
- 1527 in poetry
- 1528 in poetry
- 1529 in poetry

=== 1530s ===
- 1530 in poetry
- 1531 in poetry
- 1532 in poetry
- 1533 in poetry
- 1534 in poetry
- 1535 in poetry
- 1536 in poetry
- 1537 in poetry
- 1538 in poetry
- 1539 in poetry

=== 1540s ===
- 1540 in poetry
- 1541 in poetry
- 1542 in poetry
- 1543 in poetry
- 1544 in poetry
- 1545 in poetry
- 1546 in poetry
- 1547 in poetry
- 1548 in poetry
- 1549 in poetry

=== 1550s ===
- 1550 in poetry – Charles Bansley, The Pride of Women; Robert Crowley, One and Thyrtye Epigrammes; John Heywood, An Hundred Epigrammes; William Langland (attributed), Piers Plowman, the B text
- 1551 in poetry – Robert Crowley, published anonymously, Philargyrie of Greate Britayne; or, The Fable of the Great Giant
- 1552 in poetry – Birth of Edmund Spenser, Walter Raleigh; Works: Thomas Churchyard, A Myrrour for Man
- 1553 in poetry – Anonymous, Pierce the Ploughmans Crede; Gavin Douglas, translator, Aeneid, The Palis of Honoure, second, revised edition (publication year conjectural)
- 1554 in poetry – Miles Huggarde, The Assault of the Sacrament of the Altar; Henry Howard, The Fourth Boke of Virgill, Intreating of the Love Betweene Aeneas & Dido; Sir David Lindsay, The Monarche
- 1555 in poetry
- 1556 in poetry
- 1557 in poetry
- 1558 in poetry
- 1559 in poetry

=== 1560s ===
- 1560 in poetry
- 1561 in poetry
- 1562 in poetry
- 1563 in poetry
- 1564 in poetry – Birth of William Shakespeare English poet, playwright, and genius, Christopher Marlowe English poet
- 1565 in poetry
- 1566 in poetry
- 1567 in poetry
- 1568 in poetry
- 1569 in poetry

=== 1570s ===
- 1570 in poetry
- 1571 in poetry
- 1572 in poetry – Luís Vaz de Comões – Os Lusíadas; Birth of John Donne, important English poet, essayist, author, preacher; - Birth of Ben Jonson, important English poet, playwright, actor
- 1573 in poetry
- 1574 in poetry
- 1575 in poetry
- 1576 in poetry
- 1577 in poetry – Illustrated manuscript of the Hamzanama
- 1578 in poetry
- 1579 in poetry

=== 1580s ===
- 1580 in poetry
- 1581 in poetry – Jerusalem Delivered by Torquato Tasso; Birth of Thomas Overbury English poet (d.1613)
- 1582 in poetry
- 1583 in poetry
- 1584 in poetry
- 1585 in poetry – Death of Pierre de Ronsard
- 1586 in poetry – Birth of John Ford English poet and playwright (d. c. 1640)
- 1587 in poetry
- 1588 in poetry
- 1589 in poetry

=== 1590s ===
- 1590 in poetry
- 1591 in poetry
- 1592 in poetry
- 1593 in poetry – Birth of George Herbert Welsh poet; - Death of Christopher Marlowe English poet
- 1594 in poetry
- 1595 in poetry
- 1596 in poetry
- 1597 in poetry
- 1598 in poetry
- 1599 in poetry – Death of Edmund Spenser English poet

== 17th century ==
=== 1600s ===
- 1600 in poetry
- 1601 in poetry
- 1602 in poetry
- 1603 in poetry
- 1604 in poetry
- 1605 in poetry
- 1606 in poetry
- 1607 in poetry
- 1608 in poetry – Birth of John Milton, important English poet
- 1609 in poetry – Publication of William Shakespeare's Sonnets

=== 1610s ===
- 1610 in poetry
- 1611 in poetry
- 1612 in poetry
- 1613 in poetry – Death of Thomas Overbury English poet
- 1614 in poetry – A Wife, poem by Sir Thomas Overbury published posthumously
- 1615 in poetry
- 1616 in poetry – Death of William Shakespeare English poet, playwright and genius
- 1617 in poetry
- 1618 in poetry – Death of Sir Walter Raleigh
- 1619 in poetry

=== 1620s ===
- 1620 in poetry
- 1621 in poetry
- 1622 in poetry
- 1623 in poetry
- 1624 in poetry
- 1625 in poetry
- 1626 in poetry
- 1627 in poetry
- 1628 in poetry
- 1629 in poetry

=== 1630s ===
- 1630 in poetry
- 1631 in poetry – Death of John Donne, important English poet, essayist, author, preacher; - Birth of John Dryden influential English poet, literary critic, translator and playwright; Birth of Michael Wigglesworth (died 1705), English poet, colonist in America called "the most popular of early New England poets"
- 1632 in poetry
- 1633 in poetry
- 1634 in poetry
- 1635 in poetry
- 1636 in poetry
- 1637 in poetry – Death of Ben Jonson, important English poet, playwright, actor
- 1638 in poetry
- 1639 in poetry

=== 1640s ===
- 1640 in poetry – Biag ni Lam-ang first transcribed by Pedro Bucaneg
- 1641 in poetry
- 1642 in poetry
- 1643 in poetry
- 1644 in poetry – Birth of Matsuo Bashō the haiku poet
- 1645 in poetry
- 1646 in poetry
- 1647 in poetry – The Siege of Sziget by Miklós Zrínyi; April 1 — birth of John Wilmot, Earl of Rochester (died 1680)
- 1648 in poetry
- 1649 in poetry

=== 1650s ===
- 1650 in poetry
- 1651 in poetry
- 1652 in poetry
- 1653 in poetry
- 1654 in poetry
- 1655 in poetry
- 1656 in poetry
- 1657 in poetry
- 1658 in poetry
- 1659 in poetry

=== 1660s ===
- 1660 in poetry
- 1661 in poetry
- 1662 in poetry
- 1663 in poetry
- 1664 in poetry – Anne Bradstreet, Meditations Divine and Moral
- 1665 in poetry
- 1666 in poetry
- 1667 in poetry – Birth of Jonathan Swift, Anglo-Irish satirist, essayist, political pamphleteer, poet
- 1668 in poetry
- 1669 in poetry

=== 1670s ===
- 1670 in poetry
- 1671 in poetry
- 1672 in poetry – Birth of Joseph Addison, English essayist and poet
- 1673 in poetry
- 1674 in poetry – Death of John Milton, important English poet
- 1675 in poetry
- 1676 in poetry
- 1677 in poetry
- 1678 in poetry
- 1679 in poetry

=== 1680s ===
- 1680 in poetry
- 1681 in poetry
- 1682 in poetry
- 1683 in poetry
- 1684 in poetry
- 1685 in poetry
- 1686 in poetry
- 1687 in poetry
- 1688 in poetry – Birth of Alexander Pope, English poet
- 1689 in poetry – Oku no Hosomichi by Matsuo Bashō

=== 1690s ===
- 1690 in poetry
- 1691 in poetry
- 1692 in poetry
- 1693 in poetry
- 1694 in poetry – Death of the haiku poet Matsuo Bashō
- 1695 in poetry
- 1696 in poetry
- 1697 in poetry – Birth of Richard Savage, English poet
- 1698 in poetry
- 1699 in poetry

== 18th century ==
=== 1700s ===
- 1700 in poetry – Hikayat Hang Tuah; Death of John Dryden, influential English poet, literary critic, translator and playwright; - Birth of James Thomson, English poet
- 1701 in poetry
- 1702 in poetry
- 1703 in poetry
- 1704 in poetry
- 1705 in poetry – Death of Michael Wigglesworth (born 1631), English poet, colonist in America called "the most popular of early New England poets"
- 1706 in poetry
- 1707 in poetry
- 1708 in poetry
- 1709 in poetry – Birth of Samuel Johnson, English author, biographer

=== 1710s ===
- 1710 in poetry
- 1711 in poetry
- 1712 in poetry
- 1713 in poetry
- 1714 in poetry – First printed version of Popol Vuh
- 1715 in poetry – Birth of Buson the haiku poet
- 1716 in poetry – First printed version of the Epic of King Gesar; First printed version of The Jangar Epic; Birth of Thomas Gray, English poet, (died 1771)
- 1717 in poetry
- 1718 in poetry
- 1719 in poetry – Death of Joseph Addison, English essayist and poet

=== 1720s ===
- 1720 in poetry
- 1721 in poetry
- 1722 in poetry
- 1723 in poetry
- 1724 in poetry
- 1725 in poetry
- 1726 in poetry
- 1727 in poetry
- 1728 in poetry
- 1729 in poetry

=== 1730s ===
- 1730 in poetry
- 1731 in poetry
- 1732 in poetry
- 1733 in poetry
- 1734 in poetry
- 1735 in poetry
- 1736 in poetry – Birth of James Macpherson, Scottish poet
- 1737 in poetry
- 1738 in poetry
- 1739 in poetry

=== 1740s ===
- 1740 in poetry
- 1741 in poetry
- 1742 in poetry
- 1743 in poetry – Death of Richard Savage, English poet
- 1744 in poetry – Death of Alexander Pope, English poet; - Anonymous, Tommy Thumb's Pretty Song Book, the first extant collection of nursery rhymes
- 1745 in poetry – Death of Jonathan Swift, Anglo-Irish satirist, essayist, political pamphleteer, poet
- 1746 in poetry
- 1747 in poetry
- 1748 in poetry – Death of James Thomson
- 1749 in poetry – Birth of Johann Wolfgang von Goethe, German poet and author

=== 1750s ===
- 1750 in poetry
- 1751 in poetry
- 1752 in poetry
- 1753 in poetry
- 1754 in poetry
- 1755 in poetry
- 1756 in poetry
- 1757 in poetry
- 1758 in poetry
- 1759 in poetry – Birth of Robert Burns, Friedrich Schiller, German poet philosopher, and dramatist (died 1805)

=== 1760s ===
- 1760 in poetry
- 1761 in poetry
- 1762 in poetry – Birth of Issa the haiku poet
- 1763 in poetry – Birth of Samuel Rogers
- 1764 in poetry – Oliver Goldsmith, The Traveller
- 1765 in poetry – Thomas Percy, Reliques of Ancient English Poetry; Kristijonas Donelaitis, The Seasons
- 1766 in poetry
- 1767 in poetry
- 1768 in poetry
- 1769 in poetry

=== 1770s ===
- 1770 in poetry – Birth of William Wordsworth, important English poet (died 1850); - Death of Thomas Chatterton, 17-year-old English poet and forger of pseudo-medieval poetry born 1752
- 1771 in poetry – Death of Thomas Gray, English poet, (born 1716); - Birth of Sir Walter Scott
- 1772 in poetry – "Prometheus" - Johann Wolfgang von Goethe; Birth of Samuel Taylor Coleridge
- 1773 in poetry – Eibhlín Dubh Ní Chonaill composes "Caoineadh Airt Uí Laoghaire"
- 1774 in poetry – Birth of Robert Southey; Death of Oliver Goldsmith
- 1775 in poetry – Birth of Charles Lamb, Walter Savage Landor
- 1776 in poetry
- 1777 in poetry
- 1778 in poetry
- 1779 in poetry – Birth of Irish poet Thomas Moore

=== 1780s ===
- 1780 in poetry
- 1781 in poetry
- 1782 in poetry
- 1783 in poetry – Death of Buson the haiku poet
- 1784 in poetry – Birth of Leigh Hunt; Death of Samuel Johnson English author, wrote Lives of the Most Eminent English Poets, (1779–81)
- 1785 in poetry – William Cowper publishes The Task
- 1786 in poetry – Robert Burns publishes Poems Chiefly in the Scottish Dialect
- 1787 in poetry
- 1788 in poetry – Birth of Lord Byron, (English)
- 1789 in poetry – William Blake publishes Songs of Innocence and The Book of Thel

=== 1790s ===
- 1790 in poetry – William Blake, The Marriage of Heaven and Hell
- 1791 in poetry – William Blake, The French Revolution
- 1792 in poetry – Birth of Percy Bysshe Shelley, important English poet; - William Blake Song of Liberty
- 1793 in poetry – William Blake, Visions of the Daughters of Albion and America, A Prophecy; - Birth of John Clare, John Neal
- 1794 in poetry – Songs of Innocence and of Experience: Shewing the Two Contrary States of the Human Soul two books of poetry and The Book of Urizen by English poet and painter William Blake
- 1795 in poetry – Birth of John Keats, important English poet; - William Blake, The Book of Los, The Book of Ahania, The Song of Los
- 1796 in poetry – Death of Robert Burns, James Macpherson
- 1797 in poetry – Birth of Mary Wollstonecraft Godwin, Heinrich Heine
- 1798 in poetry – William Wordsworth and Samuel Taylor Coleridge publish Lyrical Ballads. Birth of Adam Mickiewicz, important Polish poet
- 1799 in poetry – Birth of Aleksandr Pushkin, important Russian poet

== 19th century ==
=== 1800s ===
- 1800 in poetry – Death of William Cowper
- 1801 in poetry
- 1802 in poetry – Birth of Victor Hugo
- 1803 in poetry – Birth of Fyodor Tyutchev, important Russian poet
- 1804 in poetry
- 1805 in poetry – Jerusalem poem by William Blake; - Death of Friedrich Schiller, German poet
- 1806 in poetry – Birth of Elizabeth Barrett Browning
- 1807 in poetry – Birth of Henry Wadsworth Longfellow, John Greenleaf Whittier
- 1808 in poetry – Johann Wolfgang von Goethe - Faust, Part One
- 1809 in poetry – Birth of Edgar Allan Poe, Alfred Lord Tennyson, Oliver Wendell Holmes Sr. American poet, physician, and essayist

=== 1810s ===
- 1810 in poetry – Milton: a Poem, epic poem by William Blake, written and illustrated between 1804 and 1810
- 1811 in poetry
- 1812 in poetry – Childe Harold's Pilgrimage - Lord Byron; Birth of Afanasy Fet, important Russian poet
- 1813 in poetry – The Chancellor's gold medal for an English Poem is awarded for the first time. Recipient is George Waddington.
- 1814 in poetry – West-östlicher Diwan - Johann Wolfgang von Goethe; She Walks in Beauty - Lord Byron; Percy Bysshe Shelley and Mary Wollstonecraft Godwin elope to war-ravaged France, accompanied by Godwin's stepsister, Mary Jane. Birth of Mikhail Lermontov, important Russian poet; Birth of Taras Shevchenko, important Ukrainian poet
- 1815 in poetry
- 1816 in poetry – Shelley marries Mary Woolstonecraft Godwin, Lord Byron's Childe Harold's Pilgrimage, Book III, published; Samuel Coleridge's Kubla Khan
- 1817 in poetry – Percy Bysshe Shelley, Laon and Cythna
- 1818 in poetry – Lord Byron's Childe Harold's Pilgrimage, Book IV, published; - Birth of Charles Marie René Leconte de Lisle; - Mary Shelley (née Mary Wollstonecraft Godwin publishes Frankenstein; or, The Modern Prometheus anonymously; Percy Bysshe Shelley's Ozymandias
- 1819 in poetry – Scholars described - The Great Year for John Keats, who publishes his famous Odes; Don Juan (Byron) - Lord Byron; - Birth of George Eliot, Walt Whitman, important American poet, Herman Melville, American poet, novelist, James Russell Lowell, American poet, Julia Ward Howe, American poet

=== 1820s ===
- 1820 in poetry
- 1821 in poetry – Death of John Keats, important English Romantic poet; - Birth of Charles Baudelaire, French poet and art critic
- 1822 in poetry – Lord Byron The Vision of Judgment; Death of Percy Bysshe Shelley, important English Romantic poet
- 1823 in poetry – Birth of Sándor Petőfi, Hungarian national poet Winthrop Mackworth Praed is awarded the Chancellor's gold medal for an English Poem, Clement Clarke Moore A Visit from St. Nicholas
- 1824 in poetry – Death of Lord Byron, important English Romantic poet
- 1825 in poetry – Alexander Pushkin begins publishing Eugene Onegin in serial form
- 1826 in poetry – Death of Issa the haiku poet
- 1827 in poetry – Death of William Blake
- 1828 in poetry – Birth of Dante Gabriel Rossetti
- 1829 in poetry – Alfred Lord Tennyson is awarded the Chancellor's gold medal for an English Poem

=== 1830s ===
- 1830 in poetry – Birth of Christina Rossetti in London
- 1831 in poetry – Birth of Emily Dickinson
- 1832 in poetry – Birth of Lewis Carroll; Death of Sir Walter Scott, Johann Wolfgang von Goethe
- 1833 in poetry
- 1834 in poetry – Pan Tadeusz by Adam Mickiewicz; Death of Samuel Taylor Coleridge
- 1835 in poetry – The Kalevala by Elias Lönnrot
- 1836 in poetry – The Baptism on the Savica by France Prešeren
- 1837 in poetry – Death of Aleksandr Pushkin
- 1838 in poetry – Florante at Laura by Francisco Balagtas
- 1839 in poetry

=== 1840s ===
- 1840 in poetry – Birth of Thomas Hardy
- 1841 in poetry – Death of Mikhail Lermontov
- 1842 in poetry – Birth of Stéphane Mallarmé; Alfred Tennyson Poems
- 1843 in poetry – William Wordsworth becomes Poet Laureate
- 1844 in poetry – Birth of Paul Verlaine
- 1845 in poetry – Edgar Allan Poe's The Raven
- 1846 in poetry
- 1847 in poetry – Henry Wadsworth Longfellow's Evangeline; Petar II Petrović-Njegoš's The Mountain Wreath
- 1848 in poetry – Founding of Pre-Raphaelite Brotherhood
- 1849 in poetry – Death of Edgar Allan Poe, Edgar Allan Poe's Annabel Lee, Birth of Sarah Orne Jewett (Martha's Lady)

=== 1850s ===
- 1850 in poetry – Elizabeth Barrett Browning, Sonnets from the Portuguese; Robert Browning Christmas-Eve and Easter-Day; - Death of William Wordsworth
- 1851 in poetry
- 1852 in poetry – Death of Thomas Moore
- 1853 in poetry – First and unprinted version of Friedrich Reinhold Kreutzwald's Kalevipoeg
- 1854 in poetry – Birth of Arthur Rimbaud
- 1855 in poetry – Walt Whitman's Leaves of Grass, a first stanza of Lewis Carroll's Jabberwocky, Henry Wadsworth Longfellow's The Song of Hiawatha; - Death of Adam Mickiewicz
- 1856 in poetry – Death of Heinrich Heine; - Aurora Leigh by Elizabeth Barrett Browning
- 1857 in poetry – Charles Baudelaire's Les Fleurs du mal
- 1858 in poetry – Henry Wadsworth Longfellow, The Courtship of Miles Standish
- 1859 in poetry – Death of Leigh Hunt

=== 1860s ===
- 1860 in poetry
- 1861 in poetry – Death of Taras Shevchenko, Birth of Rabindranath Tagore
- 1862 in poetry – Christina Rossetti Goblin Market, George Meredith's Modern Love
- 1863 in poetry
- 1864 in poetry – Death of John Clare, Walter Savage Landor
- 1865 in poetry – Birth of William Butler Yeats, Rudyard Kipling
- 1866 in poetry
- 1867 in poetry – Death of Charles Baudelaire, French poet and art critic; Birth of Shiki the haiku poet, Konstantin Balmont, Russian symbolist poet
- 1868 in poetry
- 1869 in poetry – George Eliot sonnet Brother & Sister; Birth of Zinaida Gippius, important Russian poet

=== 1870s ===
- 1870 in poetry
- 1871 in poetry – Lewis Carroll publishes Through the Looking-Glass, including the complete Jabberwocky. Arthur Rimbaud wrote "Letters of the Seer." Birth of Lesya Ukrainka, important Ukrainian poet
- 1872 in poetry – Christina Rossetti's In the Bleak Midwinter (Christmas carol); José Hernández's Martín Fierro; Michel Rodange's Rénert the Fox
- 1873 in poetry – Arthur Rimbaud's Une Saison en Enfer (A Season in Hell); Publication of Daredevils of Sassoun; Death of Fyodor Tyutchev
- 1874 in poetry – Arthur Rimbaud's IlluminationsFirst collection of George Eliot's poetry; - Birth of Gertrude Stein, Robert Frost, important American poet
- 1875 in poetry – French translation of Edgar Allan Poe's "The Raven", by Stéphane Mallarmé with drawings by Édouard Manet; - Birth of Rainer Maria Rilke, important pre-modernist 20th-century poet in German.
- 1876 in poetry – Death of John Neal
- 1877 in poetry – Jacint Verdaguer's L'Atlàntida
- 1878 in poetry – Birth of Oliver St. John Gogarty, Carl Sandburg, John Edward Masefield, Adelaide Crapsey
- 1879 in poetry – Birth of Patrick Pearse, Wallace Stevens

=== 1880s ===
- 1880 in poetry – Birth of Guillaume Apollinaire, Andrei Bely, Tom Kettle, Alfred Noyes, Alexander Blok
- 1881 in poetry
- 1882 in poetry – Death of Ralph Waldo Emerson, Henry Wadsworth Longfellow; Birth of James Joyce, A. A. Milne
- 1883 in poetry – Birth of William Carlos Williams
- 1884 in poetry
- 1885 in poetry – Birth of D. H. Lawrence, Ezra Pound; Death of Victor Hugo
- 1886 in poetry – Death of Emily Dickinson; birth of H.D.
- 1887 in poetry – Lāčplēsis by Andrejs Pumpurs; Birth of Marianne Moore, Joseph Plunkett, Edith Sitwell DBE
- 1888 in poetry – Birth of T. S. Eliot
- 1889 in poetry – Birth of Anna Akhmatova; death of Gerard Manley Hopkins

=== 1890s ===
- 1890 in poetry – Birth of Boris Pasternak
- 1891 in poetry – Death of Arthur Rimbaud, Herman Melville; Birth of Nelly Sachs, Osip Mandelstam
- 1892 in poetry – Emily Dickinson First collection published; Death of Walt Whitman James Russell Lowell, Alfred Lord Tennyson, Afanasy Fet; Birth of Marina Tsvetaeva, Hugh MacDiarmid
- 1893 in poetry – Birth of Vladimir Mayakovsky
- 1894 in poetry – Death of Charles Marie René Leconte de Lisle, Oliver Wendell Holmes Sr.
- 1895 in poetry – Birth of Robert Graves, Sergei Yesenin
- 1896 in poetry – Death of Paul Verlaine
- 1897 in poetry –
- 1898 in poetry – Death of Stéphane Mallarmé, Lewis Carroll; Birth of Stephen Vincent Benét, Federico García Lorca, William Soutar
- 1899 in poetry – Birth of Hart Crane, Micheál Mac Liammóir, Vladimir Nabokov

== 20th century ==
=== 1900s ===
- 1900 in poetry – Death of Oscar Wilde
- 1901 in poetry – Birth of Jaroslav Seifert
- 1902 in poetry – Death of Shiki the haiku poet; Birth of Langston Hughes; Giles Lytton Strachey is awarded the Chancellor's gold medal for an English Poem
- 1903 in poetry
- 1904 in poetry – Birth of Cecil Day-Lewis, Patrick Kavanagh, Pablo Neruda
- 1905 in poetry
- 1906 in poetry – Alfred Noyes publishes The Highwayman; Birth of Samuel Beckett
- 1907 in poetry – Rudyard Kipling awarded the Nobel Prize in Literature; Birth of W. H. Auden, Louis MacNeice
- 1908 in poetry
- 1909 in poetry – Death of Sarah Orne Jewett; Birth of Stephen Spender

=== 1910s ===
- 1910 in poetry – Death of Julia Ward Howe; Birth of Charles Olson, Jean Genet
- 1911 in poetry – Adelaide Crapsey creates the American Cinquain form; Birth of Leah Goldberg, Czesław Miłosz
- 1912 in poetry – Adelaide Crapsey creates her couplet form
- 1913 in poetry – Rabindranath Tagore awarded the Nobel Prize in Literature, Robert Bridges succeeds Alfred Austin as the UK's Poet Laureate; The launch of Imagism in the pages of Poetry magazine by H.D., Richard Aldington and Ezra Pound, Robert Frost's A Boy's Will; Death of Alfred Austin, Lesya Ukrainka; birth of R. S. Thomas
- 1914 in poetry – Death of Adelaide Crapsey; Birth of William Burroughs, Octavio Paz, Dylan Thomas
- 1915 in poetry – Death of Rupert Brooke
- 1916 in poetry – The Dada movement in art, poetry and literature coalesced at Cabaret Voltaire in Zurich, Switzerland, where Hugo Ball, Emmy Hennings, Tristan Tzara, Hans Arp, Richard Huelsenbeck, Sophie Täuber and others discussed art and put on performances expressing their disgust with World War I and the interests they believed inspired it; Death of Patrick Pearse, Joseph Mary Plunkett; Birth of Tom Kettle
- 1917 in poetry – Birth of Robert Lowell; T. S. Eliot's Prufrock and other Observations
- 1918 in poetry – Death of Guillaume Apollinaire, Wilfred Owen; Gerard Manley Hopkins's Poems published posthumously by Robert Bridges
- 1919 in poetry – Birth of Lawrence Ferlinghetti, Robert Duncan, May Swenson, William Meredith

=== 1920s ===
- 1920 in poetry – The Epic of Manas is published; approximate date of Mikhail Khudiakov's Dorvyzhy; The Dial, a longstanding American literary magazine, is re-established by Scofield Thayer, with the publication becoming an important outlet for Modernist poets and writers (until 1929), with contributors this year including Sherwood Anderson, Djuna Barnes, Kenneth Burke, Hart Crane, E. E. Cummings, Charles Demuth, Kahlil Gibran, Gaston Lachaise, Amy Lowell, Marianne Moore, Ezra Pound, Odilon Redon, Bertrand Russell, Carl Sandburg, Van Wyck Brooks, and W. B. Yeats; Birth of Paul Celan, Charles Bukowski
- 1921 in poetry – Birth of Vasko Popa, Death of Alexander Blok
- 1922 in poetry – T. S. Eliot's "The Waste Land"; Rainer Maria Rilke completes both the Duino Elegies and the Sonnets to Orpheus; Birth of Jack Kerouac, Máire Mhac an tSaoi
- 1923 in poetry – W. B. Yeats is the first Irishman awarded the Nobel Prize in Literature; Edna St. Vincent Millay is the first woman to win the Pulitzer Prize for Poetry; Birth of Brendan Behan, Yves Bonnefoy, Wisława Szymborska, Aco Šopov
- 1924 in poetry – Birth of Yehuda Amichai, Janet Frame, Zbigniew Herbert
- 1925 in poetry – Death of Sergei Yesenin, Birth of Ahmad Shamlou
- 1926 in poetry – Death of Rainer Maria Rilke, Birth of Allen Ginsberg, Robert Creeley, Frank O'Hara
- 1927 in poetry – William Soutar creates his Epigram form of the Cinquain; Birth of John Ashbery
- 1928 in poetry – The Tower (book) - W. B. Yeats; Birth of Maya Angelou, Thomas Kinsella; Death of Thomas Hardy
- 1929 in poetry – Pulitzer Prize for Poetry awarded to Stephen Vincent Benét for John Brown's Body; Birth of Ed Dorn, John Montague

=== 1930s ===
- 1930 in poetry – John Masefield succeeds Robert Bridges as the UK's Poet Laureate; Death of Robert Bridges, D. H. Lawrence, Vladimir Mayakovsky; birth of Gary Snyder, Adunis, Harold Pinter, Derek Walcott
- 1931 in poetry – Death of Vachel Lindsay, Kahlil Gibran; Birth of Tomas Tranströmer
- 1932 in poetry – Death of Hart Crane; Birth of Christy Brown, Michael McClure, David Antin, Sylvia Plath
- 1933 in poetry – The Winding Stair - W. B. Yeats; Death of Sara Teasdale; Birth of Yevgeny Yevtushenko
- 1934 in poetry – Death of Andrei Bely; Birth of Leonard Cohen, Wole Soyinka
- 1935 in poetry – Charles G. D. Roberts knighted for his poetry; Anna Akhmatova begins publishing her cycle of poems Requiem
- 1936 in poetry – Killing of Federico García Lorca, Death of Rudyard Kipling; Birth of John Giorno
- 1937 in poetry – Lahuta e Malcís - Gjergj Fishta; First-ever Governor General's Literary Awards in Canada; Birth of Diane Wakoski
- 1938 in poetry – Death of Osip Mandelstam
- 1939 in poetry – Death of W. B. Yeats; Birth of Seamus Heaney, Michael Longley; T.S. Eliot's Old Possum's Book of Practical Cats

=== 1940s ===
- 1940 in poetry – Birth of Joseph Brodsky, John Lennon
- 1941 in poetry – Death of James Joyce, Marina Tsvetaeva; Birth of Bob Dylan, Derek Mahon
- 1942 in poetry – Birth of William Matthews, Eiléan Ní Chuilleanáin; Death of Konstantin Balmont
- 1943 in poetry – Death of Stephen Vincent Benét, William Soutar in Perth; Birth of Jim Morrison; T. S. Eliot's Four Quartets published as a whole
- 1944 in poetry – Birth of Eavan Boland, Paul Durcan
- 1945 in poetry – Death of Paul Valéry, Robert Desnos, Zinaida Gippius; Birth of Van Morrison, OBE
- 1946 in poetry – "On Raglan Road" first published, with the title "Dark Haired Miriam Ran Away"; Ezra Pound brought back to the United States on treason charges, but found unfit to face trial because of insanity and sent to St. Elizabeths Hospital in Washington, D.C., where he remained for 12 years; Death of Gertrude Stein
- 1947 in poetry – Cleanth Brooks's The Well Wrought Urn: Studies in the Structure of Poetry (a classic statement of the New Criticism); Birth of Dermot Healy
- 1948 in poetry – T. S. Eliot awarded the Nobel Prize in Literature
- 1949 in poetry – Birth of Gabriel Rosenstock

=== 1950s ===
- 1950 in poetry – Death of Edna St. Vincent Millay; Birth of Mary Dorcey, Medbh McGuckian
- 1951 in poetry – Birth of Paul Muldoon
- 1952 in poetry – Death of Paul Éluard, George Santayana; Birth of Nuala Ní Dhomhnaill
- 1953 in poetry – Death of Dylan Thomas; Birth of Frank McGuinness
- 1954 in poetry – Dr. Seuss's Horton Hears a Who!
- 1955 in poetry – Discovery of the Hinilawod by F. Landa Jocano; Death of Wallace Stevens; Birth of Paula Meehan, William Wall
- 1956 in poetry – Allen Ginsberg's Howl and Other Poems, a signature of the Beat Generation published by City Lights Books, United States; Birth of Cathal Ó Searcaigh
- 1957 in poetry – Howl obscenity trial in San Francisco, Ted Hughes's The Hawk in the Rain, Dr. Seuss's The Cat in the Hat and How the Grinch Stole Christmas; Death of Oliver St. John Gogarty
- 1958 in poetry – Boris Pasternak awarded the Nobel Prize in Literature; Death of Alfred Noyes, Robert W. Service; Ezra Pound's indictment for treason is dismissed. He is released from St. Elizabeths Hospital, an insane asylum in Maryland, after spending 12 years there (starting in 1946)
- 1959 in poetry – Death of Edgar Guest, Lakshmi Prasad Devkota

=== 1960s ===
- 1960 in poetry – Dr. Seuss's Green Eggs and Ham; Death of Boris Pasternak
- 1961 in poetry – Allen Ginsberg's Kaddish and Other Poems; death of H. D., Death of Rabindranath Tagore
- 1962 in poetry – Death of E. E. Cummings
- 1963 in poetry – Bob Dylan's album The Freewheelin' Bob Dylan released (with his most influential early songwriting); Death of Nâzım Hikmet, Louis MacNeice, Sylvia Plath, Robert Frost, William Carlos Williams, Tristan Tzara, Jean Cocteau
- 1964 in poetry – John Lennon's In His Own Write, containing nonsensical poems, sketches and drawings (a best seller by the member of the Beatles); Something Else Press founded by Dick Higgins in 1963 (publishes concrete poetry by several authors, starting in 1964), Philip Larkin's The Whitsun Weddings; Death of Brendan Behan, Dame Edith Sitwell DBE
- 1965 in poetry – Death of T. S. Eliot, Randall Jarrell
- 1966 in poetry – Seamus Heaney's Death of a Naturalist; Death of Anna Akhmatova, André Breton, Frank O'Hara, Basil Bunting's Briggflatts
- 1967 in poetry – Cecil Day-Lewis selected as the UK's new Poet Laureate (succeeding John Masefield); Death of Patrick Kavanagh, John Masefield, Carl Sandburg
- 1968 in poetry – Leonard Cohen, Selected Poems, 1956-1968
- 1969 in poetry – Samuel Beckett awarded the Nobel Prize in Literature; Death of Jack Kerouac, André Salmon

=== 1970s ===
- 1970 in poetry – Death of Nelly Sachs, Charles Olson, Paul Celan, Leah Goldberg
- 1971 in poetry – Pablo Neruda awarded the Nobel Prize in Literature; Death of Jim Morrison, Ogden Nash
- 1972 in poetry – John Betjeman succeeds Cecil Day-Lewis as the UK's Poet Laureate; Death of John Berryman, Kenneth Patchen, Padraic Colum, Marianne Moore, Richard Church, Cecil Day-Lewis, Ezra Pound, Mark Van Doren, Paul Goodman
- 1973 in poetry – Death of W. H. Auden, Pablo Neruda, J. R. R. Tolkien
- 1974 in poetry – Death of Miguel Ángel Asturias, Anne Sexton; Philip Larkin's High Windows
- 1975 in poetry
- 1976 in poetry
- 1977 in poetry – Death of Robert Lowell, Vladimir Nabokov, Seán Ó Ríordáin
- 1978 in poetry – Death of Micheál Mac Liammóir
- 1979 in poetry – Death of Elizabeth Bishop; Jacqueline Osherow is awarded the Chancellor's gold medal for an English Poem

=== 1980s ===
- 1980 in poetry – Czesław Miłosz awarded the Nobel Prize in Literature; Death of Muriel Rukeyser
- 1981 in poetry – Death of Christy Brown
- 1982 in poetry – Death of Kenneth Rexroth, Archibald MacLeish, Djuna Barnes
- 1983 in poetry – Death of Ted Berrigan, Edwin Denby
- 1984 in poetry – Jaroslav Seifert awarded the Nobel Prize in Literature; Ted Hughes succeeds John Betjeman as the UK's Poet Laureate (on the refusal of Philip Larkin); Death of George Oppen
- 1985 in poetry – Death of Robert Graves, Philip Larkin
- 1986 in poetry – Wole Soyinka awarded the Nobel Prize in Literature; Death of John Ciardi, Jean Genet, Jaroslav Seifert
- 1987 in poetry – Joseph Brodsky awarded the Nobel Prize in Literature; Ezra Pound and Louis Zukofsky, Pound/Zukofsky: Selected Letters of Ezra Pound and Louis Zukofsky, edited by Barry Ahearn (Faber & Faber)
- 1988 in poetry – Death of Máirtín Ó Direáin, Miguel Piñero, Robert Duncan
- 1989 in poetry – Death of Samuel Beckett, Robert Penn Warren, May Swenson

=== 1990s ===
- 1990 in poetry – Octavio Paz awarded the Nobel Prize in Literature; Death of Lawrence Durrell
- 1991 in poetry – Death of Dr. Seuss, James Schuyler, Howard Nemerov
- 1992 in poetry – Derek Walcott awarded the Nobel Prize in Literature; Death of Eve Merriam
- 1993 in poetry – Maya Angelou reads "On the Pulse of Morning" at the inauguration of U.S. President Bill Clinton
- 1994 in poetry – Death of Charles Bukowski
- 1995 in poetry – Seamus Heaney awarded the Nobel Prize in Literature; Death of May Sarton, Sir Stephen Spender CBE, David Avidan
- 1996 in poetry – Seamus Heaney's The Spirit Level; Wisława Szymborska awarded the Nobel Prize in Literature; Death of Joseph Brodsky
- 1997 in poetry – Death of William Burroughs, Allen Ginsberg, James Dickey, Denise Levertov, David Ignatow, James Laughlin, William Matthews
- 1998 in poetry – Ted Hughes's Birthday Letters; Death of Zbigniew Herbert, Ted Hughes, Octavio Paz
- 1999 in poetry – Andrew Motion succeeds Ted Hughes as the UK's Poet Laureate; Julia Donaldson's The Gruffalo; Death of Edward Dorn

== 21st century ==
=== 2000s ===
- 2000 in poetry – Death of Yehuda Amichai, Ahmad Shamlou
- 2001 in poetry – Seamus Heaney's Electric Light; First-ever Griffin Poetry Prize in Canada; Death of Gregory Corso
- 2002 in poetry – Death of Kenneth Koch
- 2003 in poetry – John Paul II's Roman Triptych (Meditation); Kenneth Rexroth's Complete Poems (posthumous)
- 2004 in poetry – Seamus Heaney reads "Beacons of Bealtaine" for 25 leaders of the enlarged European Union; Edwin Morgan named as The Scots Makar; Death of Janet Frame, Jackson Mac Low, Czesław Miłosz
- 2005 in poetry – Harold Pinter awarded the Nobel Prize in Literature; Death of Philip Lamantia, Robert Creeley
- 2006 in poetry – Seamus Heaney's District and Circle; Death of Stanley Kunitz
- 2007 in poetry – Death of William Morris Meredith Jr., Emmett Williams
- 2008 in poetry – Death of Harold Pinter, Jonathan Williams
- 2009 in poetry – Turkish government posthumously restores Nâzım Hikmet's citizenship, stripped from him because of his beliefs; Ruth Padel the first woman elected Oxford Professor of Poetry, only to resign in controversy before taking office; Carol Ann Duffy succeeds Andrew Motion as the UK's Poet Laureate; Elizabeth Alexander reads "Praise Song for the Day" at presidential inauguration of U.S. President Barack Obama; Death of Dennis Brutus, Jim Carroll, Nicholas Hughes (son of Ted Hughes and Sylvia Plath)

=== 2010s ===
- 2010 in poetry – Seamus Heaney's Human Chain; Death of Tuli Kupferberg, Peter Orlovsky, P. Lal, Edwin Morgan
- 2011 in poetry – Tomas Tranströmer awarded the Nobel Prize in Literature; Liz Lochhead succeeds Edwin Morgan as The Scots Makar; Death of Josephine Hart, Václav Havel, Robert Kroetsch
- 2012 in poetry – Günter Grass's poem "What Must Be Said" leads to him being declared persona non grata; Death of Adrienne Rich, Wisława Szymborska
- 2013 in poetry – Death of Thomas McEvilley, Taylor Mead, Seamus Heaney
- 2014 in poetry – Death of Madeline Gins, Amiri Baraka, Juan Gelman, José Emilio Pacheco, Maya Angelou
- 2015 in poetry
- 2016 in poetry
- 2017 in poetry
- 2018 in poetry
- 2019 in poetry

=== 2020s ===
- 2020 in poetry – Lana Del Rey's Violet Bent Backwards Over the Grass
- 2021 in poetry
- 2022 in poetry
- 2023 in poetry
- 2024 in poetry
- 2025 in poetry

== See also ==
- History of poetry
