= 1270 in poetry =

List of years in poetry	(table)
- … 1260; 1261; 1262; 1263; 1264; 1265; 1266; 1267; 1268; 1269; 1270; 1271; 1272; 1273; 1274; 1275; 1276; 1277; 1278; 1279; 1280 …
- In literature 1267 1268 1269 1270 1271 1272 1273
- Art; Archaeology; Architecture; Literature; Music; Philosophy; Science; +...

== Events ==
- Tanaide Mor mac Dúinnín Ó Maolconaire becomes Ollamh Síl Muireadaigh in Ireland
- Three planhs are composed for the death of Louis IX of France:
  - Guilhem d'Autpol composes Fortz tristors es e salvaj'a retraire
  - Raimon Gaucelm de Bezers composes Ab grans trebalhs et ab grans marrimens
  - Austorc de Segret composeds No sai quim so, tan sui desconoissens (a Crusading song more than a planh)
- Joan Esteve composes Aissi quol malanans, a planh on the death of Amalric I of Narbonne
- Jacob van Maerlant's Der naturen bloeme

== Births ==
- Cino da Pistoia (died 1336), Italian jurist and poet

== Deaths ==
- Hywel ab Owain Gwynedd (born unknown), Welsh
- Dubsúilech Ó Maolconaire (born unknown), an Ollamh Síl Muireadaigh
