= 1282 in poetry =

List of years in poetry	(table)
- … 1272; 1273; 1274; 1275; 1276; 1277; 1278; 1279; 1280; 1281; 1282; 1283; 1284; 1285; 1286; 1287; 1288; 1289; 1290; 1291; 1292 …
- In literature 1279 1280 1281 1282 1283 1284 1285
- Art; Archaeology; Architecture; Literature; Music; Philosophy; Science; +...

== Events ==
- Guiraut Riquier composes the pastorela A Sant Pos de Tomeiras.

== Deaths ==
- Abû 'Uthmân Sa'îd ibn Hakam al Qurashi (born 1204), Ra'îs of Manûrqa, poet, scholar, writer; in Arabic in Menorca.
