= 1274 in poetry =

List of years in poetry	(table)
- … 1264; 1265; 1266; 1267; 1268; 1269; 1270; 1271; 1272; 1273; 1274; 1275; 1276; 1277; 1278; 1279; 1280; 1281; 1282; 1283; 1284 …
- In literature 1271 1272 1273 1274 1275 1276 1277
- Art; Archaeology; Architecture; Literature; Music; Philosophy; Science; +...

== Events ==
- May 1 – In Florence, nine-year-old Dante Alighieri first sees eight-year-old Beatrice, his lifelong muse.

== Works ==
- Bonvesin da la Riva, Liber di Tre Scricciur

== Births ==
- Nasiruddin Chiragh Dehlavi (died 1356), mystic-poet and a Sufi saint of Chishti Order
- Ibn al-Yayyab (died 1349), statesman and poet from the Nasrid kingdom of Granada

== Deaths ==
- Lal Shahbaz Qalander (born 1177), sufi saint, philosopher, poet and qalandar
