= 1283 in poetry =

List of years in poetry	(table)
- … 1273; 1274; 1275; 1276; 1277; 1278; 1279; 1280; 1281; 1282; 1283; 1284; 1285; 1286; 1287; 1288; 1289; 1290; 1291; 1292; 1293 …
- In literature 1280 1281 1282 1283 1284 1285 1286
- Art; Archaeology; Architecture; Literature; Music; Philosophy; Science; +...

== Births ==
- Juan Ruiz (died 1350), known as the Archpriest of Hita (Arcipreste de Hita), was a medieval Spanish poet

== Deaths ==
- Estimated date of death of Sa‘di (born 1184), Persian poet
- January 9 - Wen Tianxiang (born 1236), Chinese scholar-general, poet, chancellor
