= 1273 in poetry =

List of years in poetry	(table)
- … 1263; 1264; 1265; 1266; 1267; 1268; 1269; 1270; 1271; 1272; 1273; 1274; 1275; 1276; 1277; 1278; 1279; 1280; 1281; 1282; 1283 …
- In literature 1270 1271 1272 1273 1274 1275 1276
- Art; Archaeology; Architecture; Literature; Music; Philosophy; Science; +...

Events from the year 1273 in poetry.

== Deaths ==
- Rumi, (born 1207), 13th-century Turkish poet, Islamic jurist, theologian, and mystic
