= 1256 in poetry =

List of years in poetry	(table)
- … 1246; 1247; 1248; 1249; 1250; 1251; 1252; 1253; 1254; 1255; 1256; 1257; 1258; 1259; 1260; 1261; 1262; 1263; 1264; 1265; 1266 …
- In literature 1253 1254 1255 1256 1257 1258 1259
- Art; Archaeology; Architecture; Literature; Music; Philosophy; Science; +...

== Events ==
- Guittone d'Arezzo is exiled from Arezzo due to his Guelphs and Ghibellines sympathies

== Births ==
- Shekh Bhano (died 1326), Bangladesh who wrote the poetical work Ashararul Eshk

== Deaths ==
- Najmeddin Razi (born 1177), Persian Sufi
