= 1247 in poetry =

List of years in poetry	(table)
- … 1237; 1238; 1239; 1240; 1241; 1242; 1243; 1244; 1245; 1246; 1247; 1248; 1249; 1250; 1251; 1252; 1253; 1254; 1255; 1256; 1257 …
- In literature 1244 1245 1246 1247 1248 1249 1250
- Art; Archaeology; Architecture; Literature; Music; Philosophy; Science; +...

== Births ==
- Philippe de Rémi (died 1296), French jurist, royal official and poet
