= 1265 in poetry =

List of years in poetry	(table)
- … 1255; 1256; 1257; 1258; 1259; 1260; 1261; 1262; 1263; 1264; 1265; 1266; 1267; 1268; 1269; 1270; 1271; 1272; 1273; 1274; 1275 …
- In literature 1262 1263 1264 1265 1266 1267 1268
- Art; Archaeology; Architecture; Literature; Music; Philosophy; Science; +...

== Works published ==
- Shokukokin Wakashū (続古今和歌集, "Collection of Ancient and Modern Times Continued") edited by Fujiwara no Tameie, Fujiwara no Motoie, Fujiwara no Ieyoshi, Fujiwara no Yukiee and Fujiwara no Mitsutoshi: a twenty-volume imperial anthology consisting of 1,925 Japanese waka ordered in 1259 by the Retired Emperor Go-Saga.
- Book of Aneirin (Welsh) written (or more probably copied) about this date.

== Births ==
- c. June 1: Dante Alighieri (died 1321), Italian poet of the Middle Ages, author of Divine Comedy

== Deaths ==
- Philippe de Rémi (born 1210), Old French poet and trouvère
