= Planh =

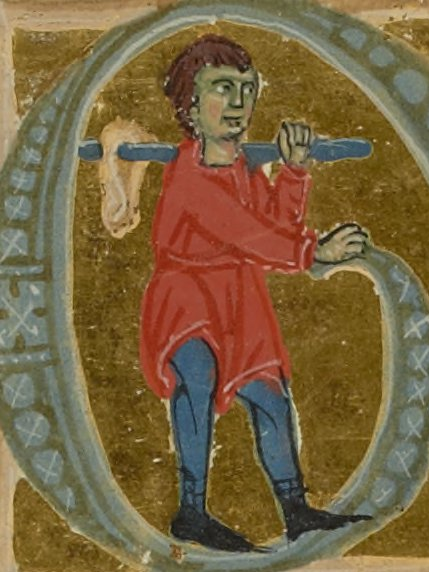
Cercamon, troubadour and author of the earliest known planh

A genre of the troubadours, the planh or plaing (Old Occitan: [ˈplaɲ]; "lament") is a funeral lament for "a great personage, a protector, a friend or relative, or a lady." Its main elements are expression of grief, praise of the deceased (eulogy) and prayer for his or her soul. It is descended from the medieval Latin planctus.

The planh is similar to the sirventes in that both were typically contrafacta. They made use of existing melodies, often imitating the original song even down to the rhymes. The most famous planh of all, however, Gaucelm Faidit's lament on the death of King Richard the Lionheart in 1199, was set to original music.

Elisabeth Schulze-Busacker identifies three types of planh: "the moralizing planh", in which the expression of grief is a point of departure for social criticism; "the true lament", in which personal grief is central; and "the courtly planh", in which the impact of the death on the court is emphasised. Alfred Jeanroy considered that the common denunciation of the evils of the present age was a feature that distinguished the planh from the planctus. In the conventions of the genre, the subject's death is announced by the simple words es mortz ("is dead"). By the 13th century, the placement of these words within the poem was fixed: it occurred in the seventh or eighth line of the first stanza. It is perhaps an indication of the sincerity of their grief that the troubadours rarely praised the successors of their patrons in the planh.

There are at least forty-four surviving planhz. The earliest planh is that by Cercamon on the death of Duke William X of Aquitaine in 1137. The latest is an anonymous lament on the death of King Robert of Naples in 1343. The planh was regarded by contemporaries as a distinct genre and is mentioned in the Doctrina de compondre dictatz (1290s) and the Leys d'amors (1341).

== Chronological table of planhz ==
The following table lists 45 planhz.

great person or patron
other troubadour
lady
friend

Composer	PC	Incipit (i.e. title)	Date	Mourned
Cercamon	112,2a	Lo plaing comens iradamen	1137	William X of Aquitaine
Giraut de Borneil	242,65	S'anc jorn aqui joi e solaz	1173	Raimbaut d'Aurenga
Guillem de Berguedà	210,9	Cousiros chan e planh e plor	1180	Pons de Mataplana
Bertran de Born ?	80,26	Si tuit li dol el plor el marrimen	1183	Henry the Young King
Bertran de Born	80,41	Mon chan fenisc el dol et ab maltraire	1183	Henry the Young King
Bertran de Born	80,6a	A totz dic qe ja mais non voil	1186	Geoffrey of Brittany
Raimbaut de Vaqueiras	392,4a	Ar pren camgat per tostemps de xantar	c. 1190	anonymous lady
Guilhem de Saint-Leidier	234,15a	Lo plus iraz remaing d'autres chatius	c. 1190	Badoc
Folquet de Marselha	155,20	Si com cel qu'es tan greujat	1192	Barral of Marseille
Gaucelm Faidit	167,22	Fortz causa es que tot lo major dan	1199	Richard the Lion-Hearted
Giraut de Borneil	242,56	Planh e sospir e plor e chan	1199	Aimar V of Limoges
Pons de Capduelh	375,7	De totz caitius sui eu aicel que plus	????	Azalais, wife of Ozil de Mercœur
Guillem Augier Novella	205,2	Cascus plor e planh son damnatge	1209	Raymond Roger Trencavel
Lanfranc Cigala	282,7	Eu non chan ges pes talan de chantar	1210s	Berlenda
Giraut de Calanso	243,6	Bels senher Deus, quo pot esser sofritz	1211	Ferdinand, infante of Castile
Gavaudan	174,3	Crezens fis verais et entiers	1212	his anonymous lady
Aimeric de Peguilhan	10,30	Ja no cugei quem pogues oblidar	1212	Azzo VI of Este and Boniface of Verona
Aimeric de Peguilhan	10,48	S'eu chantei alegres ni jauzens	1212	Azzo VI of Este and Boniface of Verona
Daude de Pradas	124,4	Be deu esser solatz marritz	1220–30	Uc Brunet
Aimeric de Peguilhan	10,10	Ara par be que Valors se desfai	1220	Guglielmo Malaspina
Aimeric de Peguilhan	10,22	De tot en tot es ar de mi partitz	????	bona comtessa Biatritz
Sordel	437,24	Planher vol En Blacatz en aquest leugier so	1237	Blacatz
Bertran d'Alamanon	76,12	Mout m'es greu d'En Sordel quar l'es faillitz sos sens	1237	Blacatz
Peire Bremon Ricas Novas	330,14	Pus partit an lo cor En Sordel e'n Bertrans	1237	Blacatz
Aimeric de Belenoi	9,1	Ailas, per que viu lonjamen ni dura	1242	Nuño Sánchez
Aimeric de Peguilhan ?	10,1=330,1a	Ab marrimen angoissos et ab plor	1245	Raymond Berengar IV of Provence
Rigaut de Berbezilh attr.	421,5a	En chantan (ieu) plaing e sospir	1245	Raymond Berengar IV of Provence
Bonifaci Calvo	102,12	S'ieu ai perdut, no s'en podon jauzir	1250–65	his anonymous lady
Bertran Carbonel	82,15	S'ieu anc nulh tems chantei alegramen	1252–65	P. G. (prob. Peire Guilhem de Tolosa)
Pons Santolh	380,1	Marritz com hom malsabens ab frachura	1260	Guilhem de Montanhagol
Raimon Gaucelm	401,7	Cascus planh lo sieu damnatge	1262	Guiraut d'Alanhan, burgess of Béziers
Anonymous	461,234	Totas honors e tug fag benestan	1266	Manfred of Sicily
Bertolome Zorzi	74,16	Sil mons fondes a meravilha gran	1268	Conradin and Frederick I of Baden
Paulet de Marselha	319,7	Razos no nes que hom deja cantar	1268	Barral of Baux
Anonymous	461,107	En chantan m'aven a retraire	1269	Gregorio di Montelongo
Guilhem d'Autpol ?	206,2	Fortz tristors es e salvatj'a retraire	1270	Louis IX of France
Guiraut Riquier	248,63	Ples de tristor, marritz e doloiros	1270	Amalric IV of Narbonne
Joan Esteve	266,1	Aissi quol malanans	1270	Amalric IV of Narbonne
Mahieu de Quercy	299,1	Tan sui marritz que nom puesc alegrar	1276	James the Conqueror
Cerverí de Girona	434a,62	Si per tristor per dol ni per cossire	1276	James the Conqueror
Cerverí de Girona	434,7e	Joys ni solatz, pascors, abrils ni mais	1276	Raimon de Cardona
Joan Esteve	266,10	Planhen ploran ab desplazer	1289	Guilhem de Lodeva
Raimon Menudet	405,1	Ab grans dolors et ab grans merrimens	????	Daude de Bossaguas
Raimon de Cornet	-	Aras quan vey de bos homes fraytura	1324	Amanieu VII of Albret
Anonymous	461,133b	Glorios Dieus, don totz bens ha creysensa	1343	Robert the Peace-Maker
