= 1226 in poetry =

List of years in poetry	(table)
- … 1216; 1217; 1218; 1219; 1220; 1221; 1222; 1223; 1224; 1225; 1226; 1227; 1228; 1229; 1230; 1231; 1232; 1233; 1234; 1235; 1236 …
- In literature 1223 1224 1225 1226 1227 1228 1229
- Art; Archaeology; Architecture; Literature; Music; Philosophy; Science; +...

== Events ==
- By August, the biographical poem L'histoire de Guillaume le Maréchal, commissioned to commemorate the life of William Marshal, 1st Earl of Pembroke, is completed, probably by a Tourangeau layman called John in the southern Welsh Marches.
- Palaizi and Tomier compose the sirventes "De chantar farai" during the siege of Avignon by Louis VIII of France.
- The poem "Of Sir Tristrem" was translated into Norse under the title of "Saga af Tristrand og Isaldis".

== Deaths ==
- October 3 - Francis of Assisi, 44, first Italian poet
