= Paulet de Marselha =

French troubadour

Paulet de Marselha (fl. 1262–1268) was a Provençal troubadour from Marseille. Three of his eight surviving works are dedicated to Barral dels Baus, the viscount of Marseille. Three were love songs composed in Marseille during an era of peace. While his patron Barral eventually came to support Charles of Anjou as Count of Provence and followed him into wars in Italy, where he died, Paulet was opposed Angevin dominance of Provence and was deprived of his possessions and forced to flee, becoming a faidit (dispossessed exile) in Catalonia.

In Catalonia he turned up at the court of Peter III of Aragon, then heir and infante of James I, at Barcelona in April–May 1262. From 1262 to 1266 he was at the court of Alfonso X of Castile. By October 1267 he had returned to Peter and a Paulet joglar (Paulet the jongleur) appears in the infante's entourage, undoubtedly Paulet de Marselha.

Like other poets (Cerverí de Girona and Folquet de Lunel) associated with the Angevin domination of Provence and the court culture of Peter of Aragon (who waged the War of the Sicilian Vespers against the Angevins) and Alfonso of Castile (who contested the rule of Italy with them), Paulet was a staunch Ghibelline. His poem Ab marriment et ab mala sabensa is customarily dated to 1268 or 1269, when he is last heard of. It was written to encourage the liberation of Henry of Castile, then a captive of Charles of Anjou in Italy.

Paulet had a connexion with James, Peter's younger brother and heir of Montpellier and Majorca. Sometime before 1262 he wrote a love song in the refrain of which he charges that because Charles of Anjou had separated him from his lover he would not, for that alone, honour him. Instead he dedicated his poem to James:

| Al nobl'enfan, on es sors fis pretz, que non es malvatz, En Jacme, cui es doussors, dars e tot so qu'als pro platz, prezen mon chan. . . | To the noble infante who merits praise for loyalty, who is no evildoer, Don Jaime, who is sweetness, liberality and all that pleases the noble, I offer my song. . . |

Perhaps as a result of this diplomacy James intervened in favour of Marseille when the city rebelled in 1262. The rebellion, led by Barral and Bonifaci VI de Castellana, was eventually put down, but it was the cause of Paulet's exile. Despite the fact that Barral eventually reconciled with Charles, Paulet nevertheless mourned his death (in 1268) in a planh entitled Razos no es que hom deja chantar ("There are no reasons left for men to sing").

Sometime between April 1265 and February 1266 Paulet composed L'autrier m'anav'ab cor pensiu, a unique pastorela in which he and a pastora (shepherdess) discuss the merits of Peter III as the saviour of Provence. This pastorela is dated based on a reference to rei Marfre (evidently Manfred of Sicily). Paulet also expresses a desire to see an alliance with N'Audoart (Edward I of England) against Charles of Anjou.

Paulet also contributed one cobla to Senh'en Jorda, sie·us manda Livernos, a four-way tenso (called a torneyamen) between himself, Guiraut Riquier, Jordan IV of L'Isle-Jourdain, and Raimon Izarn.

== Sources ==
- Riquer, Martín de. Los trovadores: historia literaria y textos. 3 vol. Barcelona: Planeta, 1975.
