= Austorc de Segret =

Auvergnat troubadour

Austorc de Segret or Austau de Segret (fl. 1270) was an Auvergnat troubadour with only one surviving sirventes, "No sai quim so, tan sui desconoissens" ('You know who I am, even if you don't recognize me').

Written in a rime mimicking that of the Italian troubadour Sordello's "Aitant ses plus viu hom quan viu jauzens", Austorc's sirventes is almost a planh for Louis IX of France, who died in 1270 on the Eighth Crusade. Besides lamenting Louis, the troubadour laments the defeat suffered by the Crusaders against the "Saracens, Turks, and Arabs". He concludes that either God or Satan is misleading Christians: there is no other possible explanation for the power of the Muslims. But among the humans Austorc is nonetheless willing to excoriate for the failed Crusade is Louis's brother Charles of Anjou, the caps e guitz (head and guide)—in Austorc's words—of the infidels because he convinced Louis to attack Tunis, not the Holy Land, and he immediately negotiated a peace with the Muslims after Louis's death.

== Sources ==
- Cabré, Miriam. "'En breu sazo aura.l jorn pretentori' (BDT 434A,20): Jaume I i Cerverí interpreten els fets de 1274." Actes del X Col·loqui de l'Associació Hispànica de Literatura Medieval. Alicante, 2003.
- Throop, Palmer A. "Criticism of Papal Crusade Policy in Old French and Provençal." Speculum, Vol. 13, No. 4. (Oct., 1938), pp 379–412.

External links

- "Aitant ses plus viu hom quan viu jauzens" with notes by Saverio Guida (2005).
- Lyric allusions to the crusades and the Holy Land
