= Zitiron =

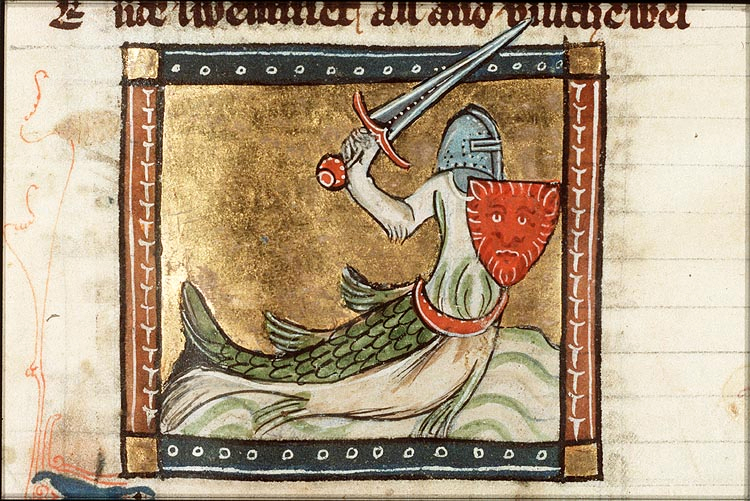
A zitiron as represented in an illuminated manuscript of Jacob van Maerlant's poem "Der Naturen Bloeme", c. 1350

A zitiron, or sea knight, is a mythological creature that has an upper body in the form of an armed knight, fused with the tail of a fish.
