= 1204 in poetry =

== Events ==
- Cadenet wrote a sirventes criticising Raymond Roger Trencavel for his poor manners on a visit to Toulouse

== Births ==
- Abû 'Uthmân Sa'îd ibn Hakam al Qurashi (died 1282), Arabic poet in Menorca

== Deaths ==
- 22 December – Fujiwara no Shunzei (born 1114), Japanese poet and nobleman
