= Pastorela =

Genre of Occitan poetry

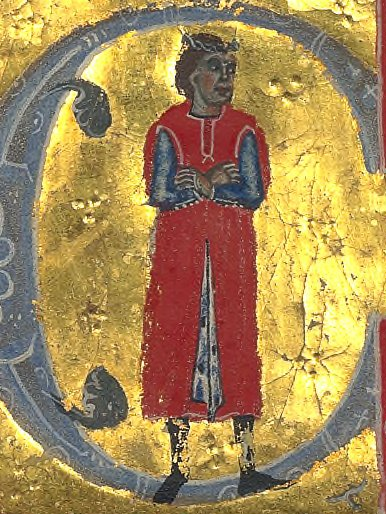
Marcabru

The pastorela (Old Occitan: [pastuˈɾɛla], "little/young shepherdess") was an Occitan lyric genre used by the troubadours. It gave rise to the Old French pastourelle. The central topic was always the meeting of a knight with a shepherdess, which could lead to any of a number of possible conclusions. They were usually humorous pieces. The genre was allegedly invented by Cercamon, whose examples do not survive, and was most famously taken up by his (alleged) pupil Marcabru.

== Table of pastorelas ==
Only a few pastorelas have survived; Audiau counts 24 "true" Old Occitan examples, mentioning 10 others which resemble them but belong to other genres and one which is a translation from French. Zemp reduces this number further, to 17.

| Composer | Incipit | Notes |
|---|---|---|
| Marcabru | L'autr' ier jost' una sebissa | |
| Marcabru | L'autr' ier, a l'issida d'abriu | |
| Giraut de Bornelh | L'autrier, lo primier jorn d'aost | |
| Giraut de Bornelh | Lo dous chan d'un auzel | |
| Gavaudan | Desamparatz, ses companho | |
| Gavaudan | L'autre dia per un mati | |
| Cadenet | L'autrier lonc un bosc folhos | |
| Gui d'Ussel | L'autre jorn cost' una via | |
| Gui d'Ussel | L'autr' ier cavalcava | |
| Gui d'Ussel | L'autre jorn per aventura | |
| Paulet de Marselha | L'autrier manei ab cor pensiu | |
| Guiraut Riquier | L'autre jorn m'anava | 1260 |
| Guiraut Riquier | L'autr' ier trobei la bergeira d'antan | 1262 |
| Guiraut Riquier | Gaia, pastorela | 1264 |
| Guiraut Riquier | L'autr' ier trobei la bergeira | 1267 |
| Guiraut Riquier | D'Astarac venia | 1276 |
| Guiraut Riquier | A Sant Pos de Tomeiras | 1282 |
| Joan Esteve | L'autr' ier al gai tems de Pascor | 1275 |
| Joan Esteve | El dous tems quan la flor sesplan | 1285 |
| Joan Esteve | Ogan al freg que fazia | 1288 |
| Guiraut d'Espanha ? | Per amor soi gai | |
| Cerverí de Girona | Entre Lerida e Belvis | |
| Cerverí de Girona | Entre Caldes e Penedes | |
| Cerverí de Girona | En mai, can per la calor | |
| Cerverí de Girona | Pres d'un jardi, encontrei l'altredia | |
| Joyos de Tolosa | L'autr' ier el dous tems de Pascor | |
| Guilhem d'Autpol | L'autr' ier a l'issida d'abril | |
| Anonymous | L'autrier al quint jorn d'Abril | |
| Anonymous | Quant escavalcai l'autr' er | Called a balada. |
| Anonymous | Mentre per una ribeira | Entitled Porquieira. |
