= Cercamonius =

Cercamonius Temporal range: Late Eocene

Scientific classification
- Domain: Eukaryota
- Kingdom: Animalia
- Phylum: Chordata
- Class: Mammalia
- Order: Primates
- Suborder: Strepsirrhini
- Family: †Notharctidae
- Genus: †Cercamonius; Gingerich, 1975
- Species: †C. brachyrhynchus

Binomial name
- †Cercamonius brachyrhynchus Gingerich, 1975

Extinct genus of primates

Cercamonius is a genus of adapiform primate that lived in Europe during the late Eocene. It was first described by Stehlin in 1912. The genus is named after the Occitan poet Cercamon, one of the earliest troubadours.

== Bibliography ==
- Gebo, D.L. (2002). "Adapiformes: Phylogeny and adaptation". In Hartwig, W.C. (ed.). The Primate Fossil Record. Cambridge University Press. ISBN 978-0-521-08141-2. OCLC 47254191.
