= Joan Miralhas =

Joan Miralhas was troubadour of Béziers in the late 13th century. Nothing is known of him besides this and that he wrote a partimen with Raimon Gaucelm, Joan Miralhas, si Dieu vos gart de dol. In it Raimon poses the question whether Joan would prefer to have the soles of his feet attached to the top of his head so that he was circular or have his entire body between his head and his ankles removed so that he had feet sticking out of his chin. Joan's initial response to his humorous and playful "dilemma" is this:

Ramon Gauselm, ja negus, ab mo vol, no vuelh semblar, ni n'ai en be razo! Mas l'un penrai, per la festa c'om col! Mais am esser trop fendutz que no pro, c'al mens aurai pider qu'e pas ses meta, si tot m'estai lo braguier sul guinho, et a vos lais que sembles feisseneta e cavalgues en travers, si·eus sap bo.

== Sources ==
- Riquer, Martín de. Los trovadores: historia literaria y textos. 3 vol. Barcelona: Planeta, 1975.
