= Joyos de Tolosa =

Joyos de Tolosa (probably late 13th century), whose first named is also spelled Joios, was a troubadour from Toulouse (also Toloza or Tholosa). He has left behind only one pastorela, "L'autr' ier el dous tems de Pascor", in which he names himself as the author. It is three coblas in length and mirrors the poem "Lantelm, qui·us onra ni·us acuoill" by Lanfranc Cigala in structure. Joyos' knight compains to the shepherdess (pastorela) of the mistreatment he receives at the hands of his lady (dompna).

== Sources ==
- Jeanroy, Alfred (1934). La poésie lyrique des troubadours. Toulouse: Privat.
- Monson, Don A. "The Troubadour's Lady Reconsidered Again." Speculum, 70:2 (Apr., 1995), pp. 255–274.
