= Bertran de Gourdon =

Bertran de Gourdon or Bertram de Gordon (fl. 1209–1231) was the lord of Gourdon, a knight and troubadour.

Initially a partisan of Raymond VI of Toulouse in the war between the Albigensian Crusade and the baronage of Languedoc, Bertran switched sides and did homage for his lands to Philip II of France in December 1211. He alludes to this action in a cobla of 1212, a response to the criticism of a certain Mahieu or Matheus (not Mathieu de Caerci) for "selling out" to the French. Bertran surrendered promptly to the Crusaders under Simon de Montfort in May 1218 and did homage to Simon for his lands.

Bertran wrote a comic tenso, that is poetical debate, with Peire Raimon de Tolosa, now known by the incipit Totz tos afars es nienz. It was dated to before 1211 by Joseph Anglade on the basis that Bertran was probably not at odds with his fellow southern barons yet if he was, as Anglade, suspects, playing host and patron to Peire Raimon, who had just recently left the court of Toulouse, the chief enemy of the French crown.

== Sources ==
- Anglade, Joseph (1920). Poésies du troubadour Peire Raimon de Toulouse: Texte et traduction.
- Jeanroy, Alfred (1934). La poésie lyrique des troubadours. Toulouse: Privat.
