= Cercamon =

Troubadour

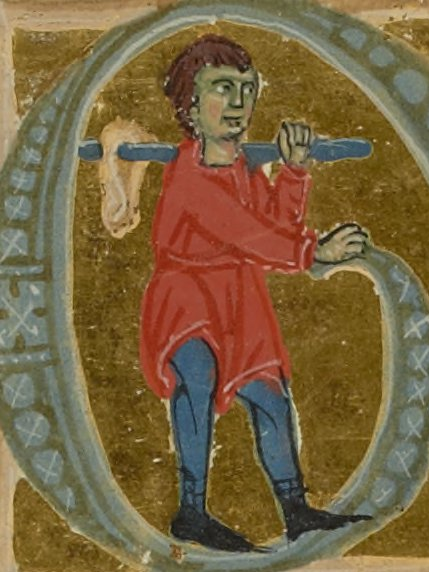
Cercamon in a 13th-century chansonnier.

Cercamon (Occitan pronunciation: [seɾkɔˈmun], fl. c. 1135-1145) was one of the earliest troubadours. His true name and other biographical data are unknown. He was apparently a Gascony-born jester of sorts who spent most of his career in the courts of William X of Aquitaine and perhaps of Eble III of Ventadorn. He was the inventor of the planh (the Provençal dirge), of the tenso (a sort of rhymed debate in which two poets write one stanza each) and perhaps of the sirventes.

Most of the information about Cercamon's life is nothing but rumour and conjecture; some of his contemporaries credit him as Marcabru's mentor, and some circumstantial evidence points to his dying on crusade as a follower of Louis VII of France.

About seven of his lyrics survive, but not a single melody; the works that most contributed to his fame among his contemporaries, his pastorelas or pastourelles, are lost.

Cercamon means "world searcher" in medieval Occitan. The fossil primate Cercamonius was named after him.
