= Calega Panzan =

Italian composer

Calega Panzano, Panzan, or Panza (1229/1230 – after 1313) was a Genoese merchant, politician and man of letters.

Calega probably belonged to the Genoese Panzano family. He had a brother named Corrado (Conrad). He is first mentioned in contemporary documents on 6 July 1248, during the war with the Emperor Frederick II, when he was probably just eighteen years old, the minimum age for signing official acts in Genoa. On 8 October 1252 he and his brother appear involved in the cloth trade for the first time. The Panzano brothers eventually extended their operations as far afield as Paris, Lagny-sur-Marne, Provins, Naples, Sicily, and Outremer (Syria).

Calega wrote a sirventes in Occitan called Ar es sazos c'om si deu alegrar discussing the evils of the clergy of Tuscany and their support for Charles of Anjou in his bid for an Italian throne. Charles was besieging Sant'Ellero at the time (17 April 1267). In the sirventes Calega celebrates the coming of Conradin and his army and the efforts of Arrigo di Castiglia, son of Ferdinand III of Castile, in early 1268 against the Angevins. Calega was a staunch Ghibelline. A Genoese document from March that year records the planning stages of Genoese involvement in Conradin's war against the Angevins, stating that "the great men (magnates) of Genoa, that is, the Spinola, the Doria, the Castello and others came to talk amongst themselves, giving each other honour as seemed fitting" (magnates Janue scilicet de Spinulis de Auria de Castello et alii venerunt ad cum loquentes sibi et faciendo sibi honorem sicut decuit). Calega and Corrado were both councillors of the Genoese commune at the time and were doubtless among those who flocked to Conradin's banner. The first lines from his sirventes bespeak his attitude towards Charles and the Church which supported him:

Ar es sazos c'om si deu alegrar
E fals clergue plagnar lur caïmen
E lur orgueill, q'a durat loniamen
E lur enian e lur fals predicar.

Now is the time that every man rejoices
And the false clergy cry their decay
And their pride that had endured a long time
And their lies and false preaching.

Calega attacked the Church for declaring a Crusade against Christians and neglecting the Holy Land (where he had economic interests). Calega attacked Charles of Anjou personally for his alleged cruelty to fellow Christians and for his truce with the Saracens of Lucera, whom he granted freedom of religious practice while Crusading against political foes in northern Italy. Calega's charge, however, that the Pope had any part in the truce with the Saracens of Lucera is probably false.

Calega married a woman named Giovanna and had two sons, Giovanni and Giacomino. He died after 1313 and probably at greater than eighty years of age.

== Sources ==
- Bertoni, Giulio. I Trovatori d'Italia: Biografie, testi, tradizioni, note. Rome: Società Multigrafica Editrice Somu, 1967 [1915].
- Throop, Palmer A. "Criticism of Papal Crusade Policy in Old French and Provençal." Speculum, 13:4 (Oct., 1938), pp. 379–412.
