= 1237 in poetry =

== Events ==
- Sordello composes a sirventes-planh in order to mark the death of his patron Blacatz.

== Births ==
- Adam de la Halle (died 1288), a French trouvère, poet and musician

== Deaths ==
- Blacatz (born 1165), Occitan troubadour
- Hélinand of Froidmont died after 1229 - likely 1237 (born 1160), medieval poet, chronicler, and ecclesiastical writer in Latin
- Fujiwara no Ietaka (born 1158), Japanese Kamakura period waka poet
