= 1285 in poetry =

This article covers 1285 in poetry.

== Works published ==
- El dous tems quan la flor sesplan, a pastorela by Joan Esteve

== Events ==
- Summer — five troubadours compose a literary cycle of sirventes on the topic of the Aragonese Crusade: Bernart d'Auriac, Peter III of Aragon, Pere Salvatge, Roger Bernard III of Foix, and an anonymous.

== Deaths ==
- Peter III of Aragon (born 1239), an Occitan troubadour and King of Aragon
