= 1230 in poetry =

== Events ==
- Beginning of the Sicilian School.
- Bernart Sicart de Maruèjols composed the sirventes "Ab greu cossire" about the effect of the Albigensian Crusade on Languedoc.
- Peire Bremon Ricas Novas and Gui de Cavalhon compose a tenso together.

== Births ==
- Guido Guinizelli, born between 1230-1240 (died 1276), Italian poet and 'founder' of the Dolce Stil Novo
- Guiraut Riquier (died 1292), an Occitan troubadour

== Deaths ==
- Janna, Kannada
- Walther von der Vogelweide (born 1170), Middle High German lyric poet (approximate date)
