= 1291 in poetry =

== Works ==
- Jacob van Maerlant writes his last poem Van den Lande van Oversee after the fall of Acre, Israel

== Births ==
- Philippe de Vitry (died 1361), French composer, music theorist and poet

== Deaths ==
- Saadi Shirazi, Persian (est. - some sources suggest as early as 1283)
