= Guilhem d'Autpol =

Guilhem d'Autpol or Daspol (fl. 1265–1270) was a troubadour from Hautpoul in the Languedoc. He wrote four works that survive, three dwelling on intensely religious themes. There exists some evidence internal in his songs that he was a jongleur early on.

Esperansa de totz ferms esperans is a religious alba addressed to the Virgin Mary. L'autriers, a l'intrada d'abril is a pious pastorela that may allude to Joan Oliva, a Catalan friar who was active post-1270. This would make the work Guilhem's latest.

His earliest datable work is tenso with God, Seinhos, aujas, c'aves saber e sen, which must have been written sometime between the fall of Caesarea and Arsuf to the Mamluks in 1265 and the Crusade led by James the Conqueror—mentioned in the poem—in 1269. The chief object of Guilhem's addresses to God was a common one among troubadours of his time: the papal policy of launching Crusades against Christians or heretics in Europe to the detriment of the Crusader States in the Holy Land, and the rise of the Mamluks in Egypt and Syria. God's response is an attack on those who act unjustly in his name, such as the Templars and Hospitallers, and looks forward to the Crusade of 1269. The tenso has affinities with the work of Peire Cardenal and the Monge de Montaudon.

Guilhem's only other datable work is a lengthy planh on the death of Louis IX of France (1270), Fortz tristors es e salvaj'a retraire.

== Sources ==
- Riquer, Martín de. Los trovadores: historia literaria y textos. 3 vol. Barcelona: Planeta, 1975.
