= 1268 in poetry =

This article covers 1268 in poetry.

== Events ==
- The Italian Calega Panzan composes Ar es sazos c'om si deu alegrar, a sirventes attacking the Guelphs and Angevins.
- Raimon Gaucelm de Bezers composes Qui vol aver complida amistansa, a canso about Louis IX of France and his preparations for the Eighth Crusade.
- Paulet de Marselha composes Razos no es que hom deja chantar, a planh on the death of Barral des Baux.
- Manuscript "V", one of the earliest preserved chansonniers, is compiled in Catalonia.
