= Matieu de Caersi =

Poem composer from France

Matieu de Caersi, Caerci, or Querci was a troubadour from the Quercy. According to the rubric accompanying his only song in troubadour manuscript C, he was Mayestre Matieus de Caersi, that is, a Master of Arts from Quercy, possibly Cahors. He is not to be identified with the Matheus who composed a tenso with Bertram de Gordon in 1212.

Matieu's lone surviving song is Tant suy marritz que no.m puese alegrar ("I am so afflicted that I cannot be happy"), a planh on the death of James I of Aragon (died 26 August 1276). It is often compared and contrasted with another planh on James' death composed by Cerverí de Girona, Si per tristor, per dol no per cossir. Cerverí's piece is direct and almost personal, as the troubadour asks the Virgin Mary to show as much mercy to James as he showed on earth, referring to his establishing the Mercedarian Order in Barcelona. Matieu, on the other hand, is moralising and religious. He is also self-concerned, as he asks James' sons to continue to protect him. The merits of both works have been debated by critics.

Structurally, Matieu imposes coblas capfinidas on what is otherwise the metric and rhyme form used by Raimbaut de Vaqueiras in Ara pot hom conoisser e proar. The pieces also has two tornadas. The first plays on the fact that James died a day after the feast day of James, son of Zebedee (Santiago Matamoros): de dos Jacmes dobla festa.ns remanha [Dieu] ("from two James God has given us a double festival"). Earlier Matieu had compared the sorrow of the people of James' lands as like that of the Britons bemoaning the loss of King Arthur: ben devetz aitant de dol aver cum per Artus agron silh de Bretanha.

== Sources ==
- Riquer, Martín de. Los trovadores: historia literaria y textos. 3 vol. Barcelona: Planeta, 1975.
