= 1262 in poetry =

This article covers 1262 in poetry.

== Works published ==
- Sitot no m'es fort gaya la sazos by Bonifaci VI de Castellana, written at Montpellier, an attack on Charles of Anjou
- Quascus planh le sieu damnatge, a planh of Raimon Gaucelm de Bezers for a bourgeois of Béziers named Guiraut de Linhan and the only such poem surviving for a middle-class figure
- L'autr' ier trobei la bergeira d'antan, a pastorela by Guiraut Riquier

== Births ==
- Guan Daosheng, Chinese poet and painter during the Yuan Dynasty (died 1319)
- U Tak, Korean poet (died 1342)
