= 1233 in poetry =

This article covers 1233 in poetry.

== Events ==
- Guilhem de la Tor composed Canson ab gais motz plazens on the death of Giovanna d'Este in November. The poet himself was never mentioned again.
- Muslim Volga Bulgarian Old Tatar poet Qul Ghali wrote Qissa-i Yusuf (قصه یوسف, Tale of Yusuf), a narrative of Joseph in Islam.

== Births ==
- Ramon Llull (died 1315), Catalan writer and philosopher (born 1232 or 1233)
