= 1242 in poetry =

== Events ==
- Aimeric de Belenoi writes a planh for Nuño Sánchez.

== Deaths ==
- Blacasset (born unknown), troubadour
