= 1236 in poetry =

This article covers 1236 in poetry.

== Works ==
- Lucas de Tuy and others, Chronicon Mundi ("Great Chronicle of the World")

== Births ==
- June 6 – Wen Tianxiang (died 1283), Chinese scholar-general, poet and chancellor
- October – Qutb al-Din al-Shirazi (died 1311), Persian polymath and poet

== Deaths ==
- Probable – Qul Ghali, Muslim Volga Bulgarian Old Tatar poet (born c. 1183)
