= 1292 in poetry =

This article covers 1292 in poetry.

== Deaths ==
- Guiraut Riquier (born 1230), an Occitan troubadour
