= 1286 in poetry =

== Events ==
- Francx reys Frances, per cuy son Angevi written by Joan Esteve to Philip III of France after the French defeat in the Battle of Les Formigues and the capture of the French admiral Guilhem de Lodeva.

== Deaths ==
- Sharaf al-Din Harun Juvayni
- Ibn Sa'id al-Maghribi, Arab geographer, historian and poet
