= 1227 in poetry =

This article covers 1227 in poetry.

== Events ==
- Reinmar von Zweter starts writing his first poems for Frederick II, Duke of Austria

== Works ==
- William the Clerk of Normandy composes Besant de Dieu, an allegorical poem, and Les treis moz de l'evesque de Lincoln
