= Cerverí de Girona =

Catalan troubadour

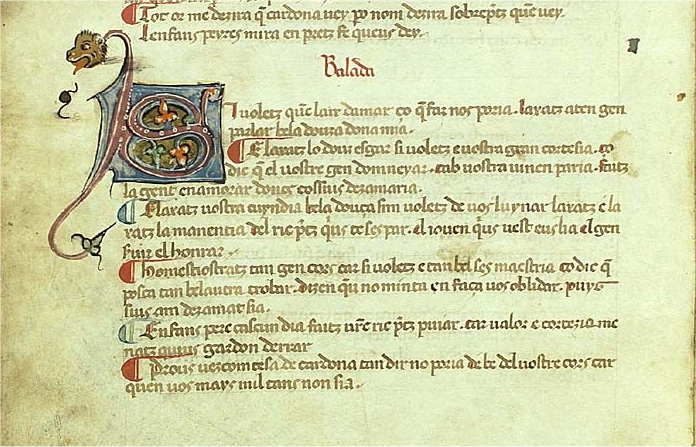
"Si voletz que.m laix d'amar", Biblioteca Nacional de Catalunya, Cançoner Gil, ms. 146, f. 34v

Cerverí de Girona (Catalan pronunciation: [səɾβəˈɾi ðə ʒiˈɾonə]; fl. 1259 – 1285) was a Catalan troubadour born Guillem de Cervera in Girona. He was the most prolific troubadour, leaving behind some 114 lyric poems among other works, including an ensenhamen of proverbs for his son, totaling about 130. He was a court poet to James the Conqueror and Peter the Great. He wrote pastorelas and sirventes and his overriding concern was the complexities of court life. None of his music survives.

Cerverí spent some time under the patronage and at the court of Hugh IV and Henry II of Rodez. He was in Spain in 1269, for he is found that year in the entourage of the then-infante Peter the Great. With fellow troubadours Folquet de Lunel and Dalfinet he accompanied Peter to Toledo. On 26 April at Riello, near Cuenca, he received one solidus for his services. Cerverí's Cobla en sis lengatges ("Verse in six languages") copied the metre of either Folquet's Al bon rey q'es reys de pretz car or Sordel's Bel m'es ab motz leugiers a far.

Cerverí wrote Si per tristor, per dol no per cossir, a planh, on 26 August 1276 for the death of James the Conqueror. It is direct and almost personal. The troubadour asks the Virgin Mary to show as much mercy to James as he showed on earth, referring to his establishing the Mercedarian Order in Barcelona. The poet Matieu de Caersi wrote a very different planh, Tant suy marritz que no.m puese alegrar, for James, moralising and religious in tone.

== Sources ==
- Cabré, Miriam. Cerverí de Girona: un trobador al servei de Pere el Gran. Barcelona-Palma: Universitat de Barcelona-Universitat de les Illes Balears, 2011. ISBN 978-84-475-3513-2.
- Cabré, Miriam. Cerverí de Girona and his Poetic Traditions. London: Tamesis, 1999. ISBN 978-1-85566-042-7.
- Gaunt, Simon, and Kay, Sarah. "Appendix I: Major Troubadours" (pp. 279–291). The Troubadours: An Introduction. Simon Gaunt and Sarah Kay, edd. Cambridge: Cambridge University Press, 1999. ISBN 0-521-57473-0.
- Riquer, Martín de. Los trovadores: historia literaria y textos. 3 vol. Barcelona: Planeta, 1975.
