= 1228 in poetry =

This article covers 1228 in poetry.

== Events ==
- The troubadour Falquet de Romans wrote of the departure of the Sixth Crusade.
- The troubadour Guilhem Figueira denied the efficacy of the crusade indulgences, and claims it caused the death of Louis VIII of France.
