= Raimon Gaucelm de Bezers =

Languedocian troubadour (fl. 1262–1275)

Raimon Gaucelm de Bezers (fl. 1262–1275) was a Languedocian troubadour with nine surviving works. Many of his works appear with dates in the rubrics in manuscript C, a 14th-century work now "BN f.f. 856" in the Bibliothèque nationale de France, Paris, allowing his career to be dated with ease.

Raimon was from Béziers, where he was a contemporary resident with Joan Esteve and Bernart d'Auriac. The poets of Béziers in that day were Gallicised heavily and supported the French over and against the native Occitan aristocracy. In this vein he wrote, in 1268, Qui vol aver complida amistansa, a canso about Louis IX of France and his preparations for the Eighth Crusade. In 1270 he wrote Ab grans trebalhs et ab grans marrimens, another canso and this time also a planh for Louis IX after his failed Crusade and death.

Raimon was a middle-class, urban poet, and certainly no courtesan. He was also a non-noble opponent of the artificial courtliness which surrounded aristocratic life in his day. He wrote A penas vauc en loc qu'om nom deman to encourage generosity to the poor. It is an indicator of his status in society that he penned Quascus planh le sieu damnatge, a planh (1262) for a local bourgeois named Guiraut de Linhan and the only such poem surviving for a middle-class figure.

Raimon was fairly popular in his own lifetime, as evidenced by the first stanza of Un sirventes, si pogues, volgra far, a sirventes. In it Raimon says that he wishes to go somewhere where the people don't ask him avetz fag res novel? ('have you made anything new?'). This poem was dedicated to Raimon Gaucelm de Sabran, lord of Uzès, whom Raimon calls fraire (brother) because they share a first name. Another poem, Belh Senher Dieus, quora veirai mo fraire, was dedicated, according to its rubric, to the senhor d'Uzest que avia nom aissi quon elh Raimon Gaucelm ('lord of Uzès who has the same name as Raimon Gaucelm').

Raimon composed one humorous partimen (a tenso with a proposed dilemma) with Joan Miralhas in which Raimon poses the following question:

Joan Miralhas, si Dieu vos gart de dol, cal re·s plai mai d'aquesta partizo: que siatz totz redons del cap tro·l sol, o totz fendutz del pe tro al mento e que portes sobre·l nas la culveta?	Joan Miralhas, may God guard you from pain, what would please you more from the following partimen: that you be circular with your head attached to your sole, or cleaved of everything between your feet and your chin and thus to wear a belt around your nose?

Raimon also wrote religious songs, including A Dieu done m'arma de bon'amor and Dieus m'a dada febre tersana dobla. This last was, according to the rubric, so son coblas que fes R. Gaucelm quan fo malautes ('the stanzas R. Gaucelm made when he was ill'). It was composed on the model of A Dieu done m'arma as a prayer to God for delivery from illness and from sin, possibly on the poet's deathbed (c. 285).

== Works ==
- Complete works at Rialto

== Sources ==
- Riquer, Martín de. Los trovadores: historia literaria y textos. 3 vol. Barcelona: Planeta, 1975.
