= 1288 in poetry =

== Events ==
- Joan Esteve, troubadour, composes the pastorela "Ogan, ab freg que fazia"

== Deaths ==
- Adam de la Halle (born 1237), a French trouvère, poet and musician
- Shang Ting (born 1209), writer of Chinese Sanqu poetry
- Tikkana (born 1205), second poet of "Trinity of Poets (Kavi Trayam)" that translated Mahabharatamu into Telugu over a period of few centuries
