= 1245 in poetry =

This article covers 1245 in poetry.

== Events ==
- Aimeric de Peguilhan likely wrote Ab marrimen angoissos et ab plor, a planh for Raymond Berengar IV of Provence.
- Troubadour Lanfranc Cigala accuses Boniface II of Montferrat of corruption and heresy due to his involvement with Frederick II, Holy Roman Emperor.
