= 1229 in poetry =

This article covers 1229 in poetry.

== Events ==
- Guilhem Figueira wrote the sirventes contra Roma (also known as D'un sirventes far), attacking the Papacy while he was in Toulouse besieged by the Albigensian Crusade.
- Joan d'Aubusson, a Ghibelline at the court of Emperor Frederick II, praises the bond between the emperor and Boniface II of Montferrat in verse.
