= 1287 in poetry =

== Deaths ==
- August 31: Konrad von Würzburg (born unknown), German Minnesänger
