= 1252 in poetry =

== Works published ==
- Era, pueis yverns es e.l fil by Bonifaci VI de Castellana, an attack on clerics, Henry III of England, and James I of Aragon
- Arnaut Catalan and Alfonso X of Castile compose a tenso in which the former uses Occitan and the latter Galician-Portuguese

== Deaths ==
- Henry I of Anhalt, literary patron and poet
