= 1260 in poetry =

This article covers 1260 in poetry.

== Works published ==
- Gerra e trebailh e brega.m plaz by Bonifaci VI de Castellana, attack on Charles of Anjou
- L'autre jorn m'anava, a pastorela by Guiraut Riquier

== Births ==
- Cecco Angiolieri (died 1312), Italian poet

== Deaths ==
- 26 August — Alberico da Romano (born 1196), patron and troubadour, executed
- Richard de Fournival (born 1201), a Trouvère
