= 1284 in poetry =

== Events ==
- Romans de mondana vida of Folquet de Lunel written
- A bloody incident mars the feast of the Ascension in Béziers and the troubadour Joan Esteve composes Quossi moria to lament it
- Paolo Lanfranchi da Pistoia composes the only known surviving Occitan language sonnet, Valenz Senher, rei dels Aragones for Peter III of Aragon during the height of the War of the Sicilian Vespers

== Deaths ==
- Sturla Þórðarson (born 1214), Icelandic politician/chieftain and writer; author of Íslendinga saga
- Alfonso X of Castile (born 1221), Castilian monarch and writer of Galician-Portuguese lyrics
