= Bonifaci VI de Castellana =

French knight, lord, and troubadour

Bonifaci VI de Castellana or Castelhana (French: Boniface de Castellane; fl. 1244–1265) was a Provençal knight and lord, one of the last of the great independent seigneurs of the land before the reign of Charles of Anjou (1246). He was first mentioned in 1244 and succeeded his father as lord of Castellana on 13 June 1249. He was a bellicose Ghibelline.

In 1248, Bonifaci and Barral of Baux led a rebellion against Charles of Anjou, who was gone on the Seventh Crusade. Charles suppressed the uprising after he returned in 1250. Bonifaci's turbulent political career can be traced through his three surviving sirventes, lyric poetic works on political themes in the Occitan language, each written at different points in his conflict with Charles of Anjou. In the latter half of 1252, he wrote Era, pueis yverns es e.l fil, an attack on clerics (the Papacy supported Charles), Henry III of England (a relative of Charles by marriage), and even James I of Aragon (he did not avenge his father Peter II's murder at Muret).

The pact between Charles and several cities of Piedmont in 1260 provoked another violent poem in the style of Bertran de Born, Gerra e trebailh e brega.m plaz. Early in 1262, Bonifaci led another revolt against Charles' rule in Marseille. This time, Barral of Baux remained loyal to Charles, but his cousin Hugh of Baux joined Bonifaci. In response, Charles destroyed Castellana and forced Bonifaci into exile. He fled to the court of James I at Montpellier. There, he penned Sitot no m'es fort gaya la sazos, identical in metre and rhyme scheme with Humils e francs e fis soplei ves vos by Pons de Capduelh. From Montpellier, he continued into Spain, where he was at Huesca in February 1265, at the court of the infante Peter the Great, arranging an alliance against Charles. He was at Valencia in July, but after that, he disappeared from the sources and probably died soon after.

== Sources ==
- Riquer, Martín de (1975). Los trovadores: historia literaria y textos. 3 vols. Barcelona: Editorial Planeta.
- Runciman, Steven (1958). The Sicilian Vespers: A History of the Mediterranean World in the Later Thirteenth Century. London: Cambridge University Press. OCLC 315065012.
