= 1249 in poetry =

This article covers 1249 in poetry.

== Deaths ==
- Pietro della Vigna (born 1190), Italian jurist, diplomat, poet, and sonneteer of the Sicilian School, by suicide
