= 1254 in poetry =

This article covers 1254 in poetry.

== Works published ==
- The chansonnier (song book) known as troubadour manuscript "D" was assembled in Italy. It is one of the earliest of its kind, containing a wealth of Occitan lyric poetry. It is now in the Biblioteca Estense in Modena under "α, R.4.4".
