= 1255 in poetry =

This article covers 1255 in poetry.

== Births ==
- Guido Cavalcanti (died 1300), Italian poet
