= 1250 in poetry =

== Works published ==
Þiðrekssaga (approx.).

== Deaths ==
- Kambar (born 1180), medieval Tamil poet and the author of the Ramavataram
- Julian of Speyer (born unknown), German Franciscan composer, poet, and historian; Latin (approx.)
