= Jacob van Maerlant =

13th-century Flemish poet

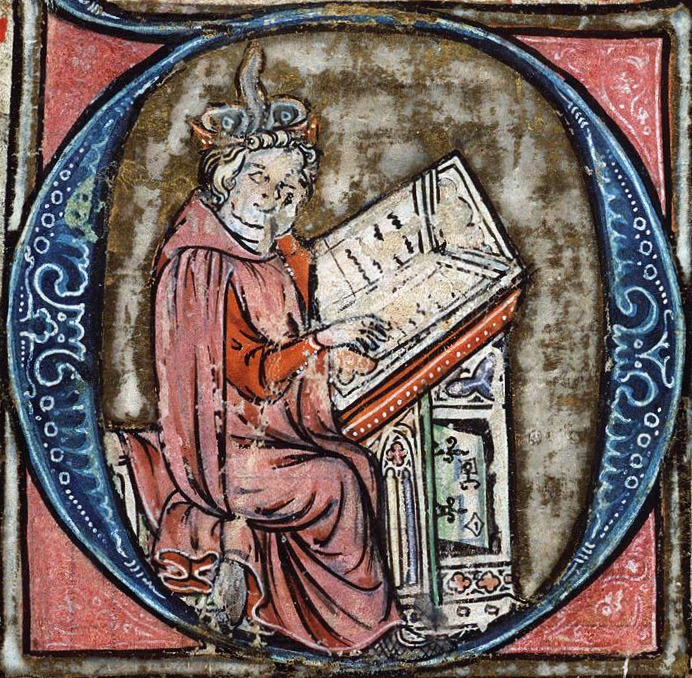
Jacob van Maerlant

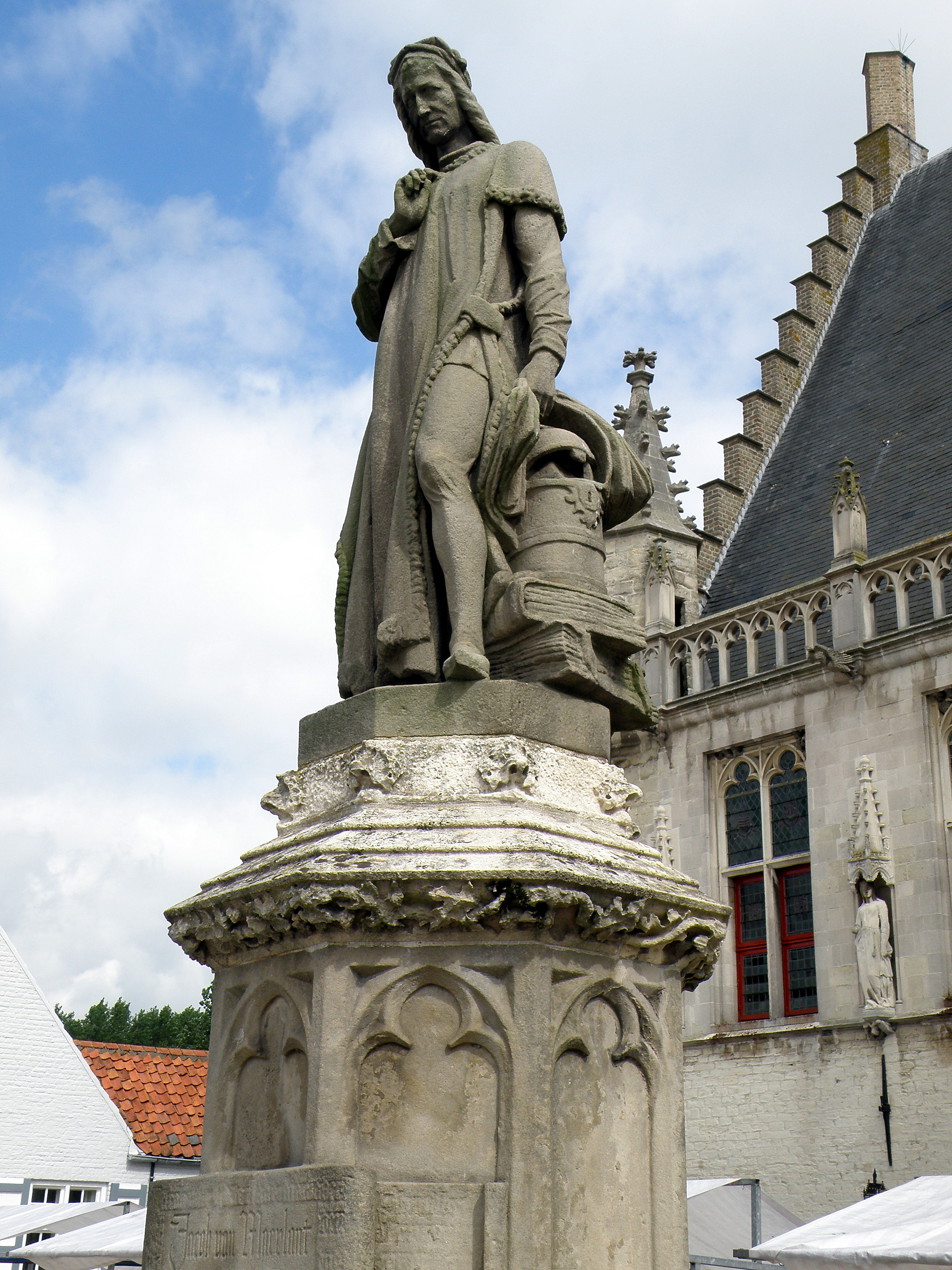
Statue of Jacob van Maerlant in Damme, by Hendrik Pickery

Jacob van Maerlant (c. 1230–40 – c. 1288–1300) was a Flemish poet of the 13th century and one of the most important Middle Dutch authors during the Middle Ages.

== Biography ==
Jacob van Maerlant was born near Bruges and initially worked as a sacristan in Maerlant, located on the island of Oostvoorne. He later became a sexton, which earned him the surname "de Coster." Afterward, he moved to Damme, near Bruges, where he is believed to have served as the town clerk.

In the beginning, Jacob focused on translating French romances into Middle Dutch. However, his most significant work in the realm of romance poetry was his Historie van Troyen, composed around 1264. This epic poem, consisting of approximately forty thousand lines, was a translation and expansion of Benoît de Sainte-Maure's Roman de Troie.

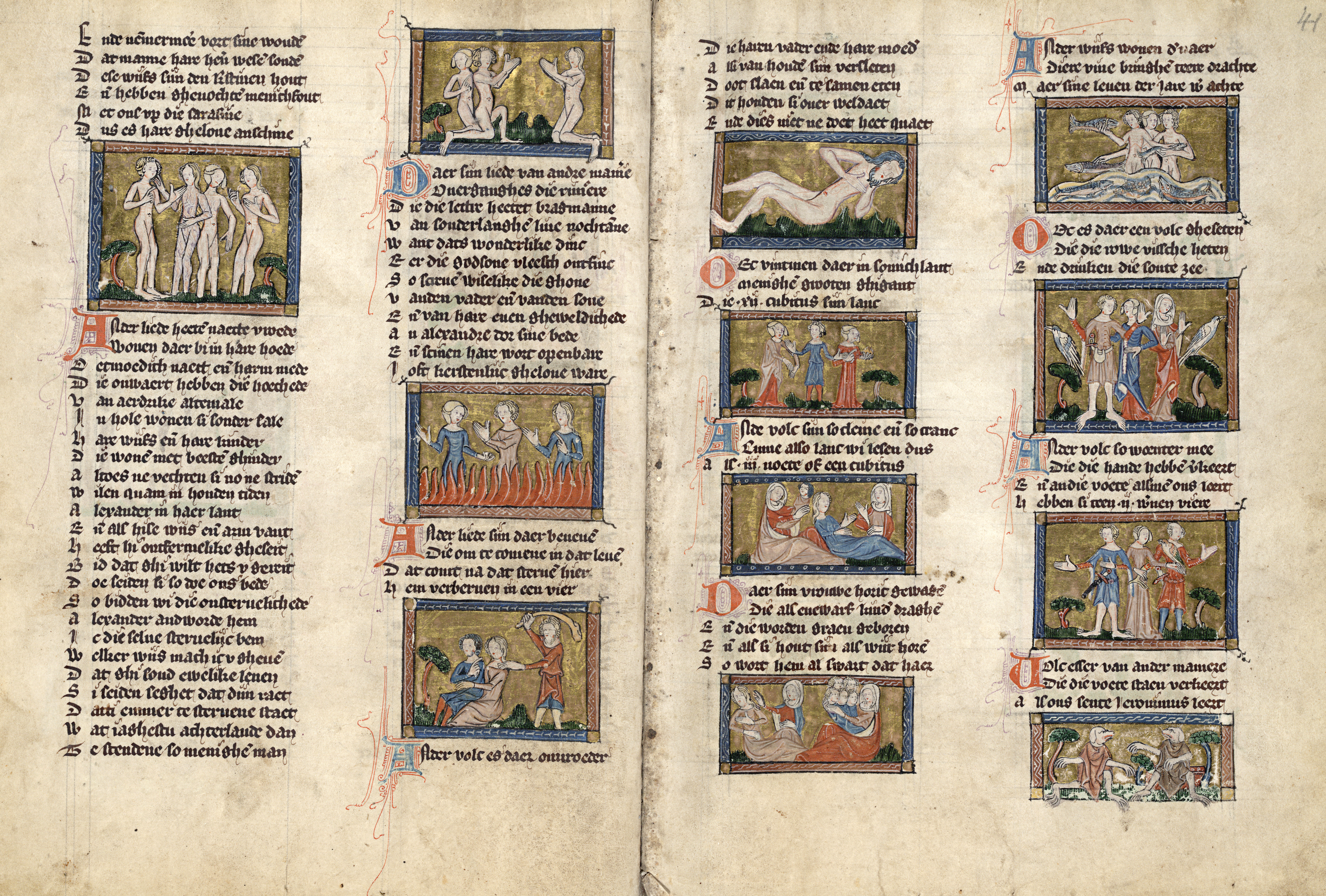
Strange peoples in Der naturen bloeme

From this time Jacob rejected romance as idle, and devoted himself to writing scientific and historical works for the education and, enlightenment of the Flemish and Dutch nobility. His Heimelicheit der Heimelicheden (c. 1266) is a translation of the Secreta secretorum, a manual for the education of princes, ascribed throughout the Middle Ages to Aristotle. Van der Naturen Bloeme is a free translation of De natura rerum, a natural history in twenty books by a native of Brabant, Thomas of Cantimpré; and his Rijmbijbel is taken, with many omissions and additions, from the Historia scholastica of Petrus Comestor. He supplemented this metrical paraphrase of scripture history by Die Wrake van Jherusalem (1271) by Josephus. He also translated a Life of St. Francis (Leven van St. Franciscus) from the Latin of Bonaventure. Jacob's most extensive work is the Spiegel Historiael, a rhymed chronicle of the world, translated, with omissions and important additions, from the Speculum historiale of Vincent de Beauvais. It is dedicated to Count Floris V and was begun in 1283, but was left unfinished at the poet's death. Continuations were given by Philip Utenbroeke and Lodewijc van Velthem, a Brabant priest. He wrote three Arthurian works: Torec, which survives in the massive Lancelot Compilation, and two romances based on the works of Robert de Boron: Historie van den Grale and Boec van Merline, which tell the stories of Joseph of Arimathea and Merlin.

Jacob is also the author of a number of strophic poems, which date from different periods of his life. Of these, the best known is the Wapene Martijn ("Alas! Martin") so called from the opening words. It is a dialogue on the course of events held between the poet himself and a character named Martin. Altogether there are three parts, of which the above-mentioned is the first. The other two parts are known as Dander Martijn ("Second Martin") and Derden Martijn ("Third Martin").

Other poems of this kind are Van ons Heren wonden, a translation of the hymn Salve mea! o patrona; Die Clausule van der Bible, an allegorical poem in praise of the Virgin Mary; the Disputacie van onser Vrouwen ende van den helighen Cruce, which bewails the sad situation of the Holy Land. Jacob's last poem Van den Lande van Oversee was written after the fall of Acre (1291) and is a stirring summons to a crusade against the infidels, with bitter complaints about abuses in the Church. The Geesten were edited by Franck (Groningen, 1882). Complete editions of the strophic poems were given by E. Verwijs (Groningen, 1880) and by J. Franck and J. Verdam (Groningen, 1898).

Based on doctoral research (Van Anrooij 1997), it is now thought likely that Jacob was also the author of the hitherto anonymous Van neghen den besten ("On the Nine Worthies"). This would be his last work. It is one of the few works with European distribution whose source text was written in Middle Dutch. The work had a profound and lasting impact on the honor code of the Western European knightly elite.

Jacob died in the closing years of the 13th century. The greater part of his work consists of translations, but he also produced poems that prove him to have had real original poetic faculty. Among these are Die Clausule van der Bible, Der Kerken Clage, imitated from a Complainte of Rutebeuf, and the three dialogues entitled Martijn, in which the fundamental questions of theology and ethics were discussed.

Although Jacob was an orthodox Roman Catholic, he is said to have been called to account by the priests for translating the Bible into the vulgar tongue. In spite of his orthodoxy, Jacob was a keen satirist of the corruption of the clergy. He was one of the most learned men of his age, and for two centuries was the most celebrated of Flemish poets.

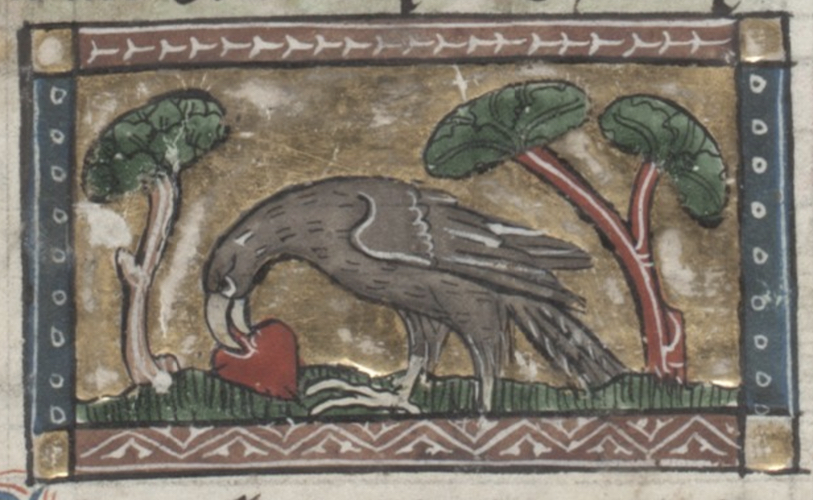
A drawing of a bird from the German manuscript Der Naturen Bloeme

== Biographical uncertainty ==
The date and year of his birth are unknown. Estimates range between 1230 and 1240, as his oldest work, Alexanders geesten (The Deeds of Alexander the Great), was likely written shortly after 1260. Jacob's place of birth and information regarding his parents are also unknown. His language was analyzed by the Dutch linguists Amand Berteloot and Evert van den Berg, who came to the conclusion that he learned to speak in the County of Flanders, somewhere south of the city of Bruges, Belgium.

Jacob's place and time of death is also unknown. Tradition holds that Jacob must have been alive in 1291, because he is considered to be the author of the poem Vanden lande van Overzee (On the Land across the Sea), which discusses the fall of the last Christian city in the Holy Land, Saint-Jean d'Acres. This poem, which survived in only one manuscript (UB Groningen, Ms. 405), has no name attached to it. None of the texts in this manuscript bears the name of its author. However, he has historically been seen as the author of this poem, particularly by Nineteenth-century Dutch scholars. This claim was based on a verse in the 19th and last stanza: "Ghi heren, dit is Jacobs vont", meaning 'Gentlemen, this is Jacob's creation'. For the 19th century, this was more than enough proof that the poet could not have been anybody else than Jacob van Maerlant. This is most likely an unsound theory as Jacob only referred to himself as such in his early life. By the time it is purported he wrote this poem, he was just using his last name 'Maerlant'. A recent examination of this manuscript by historian Jos Biemans confirmed that it is unlikely he was the author of this poem.

== Attributed works ==
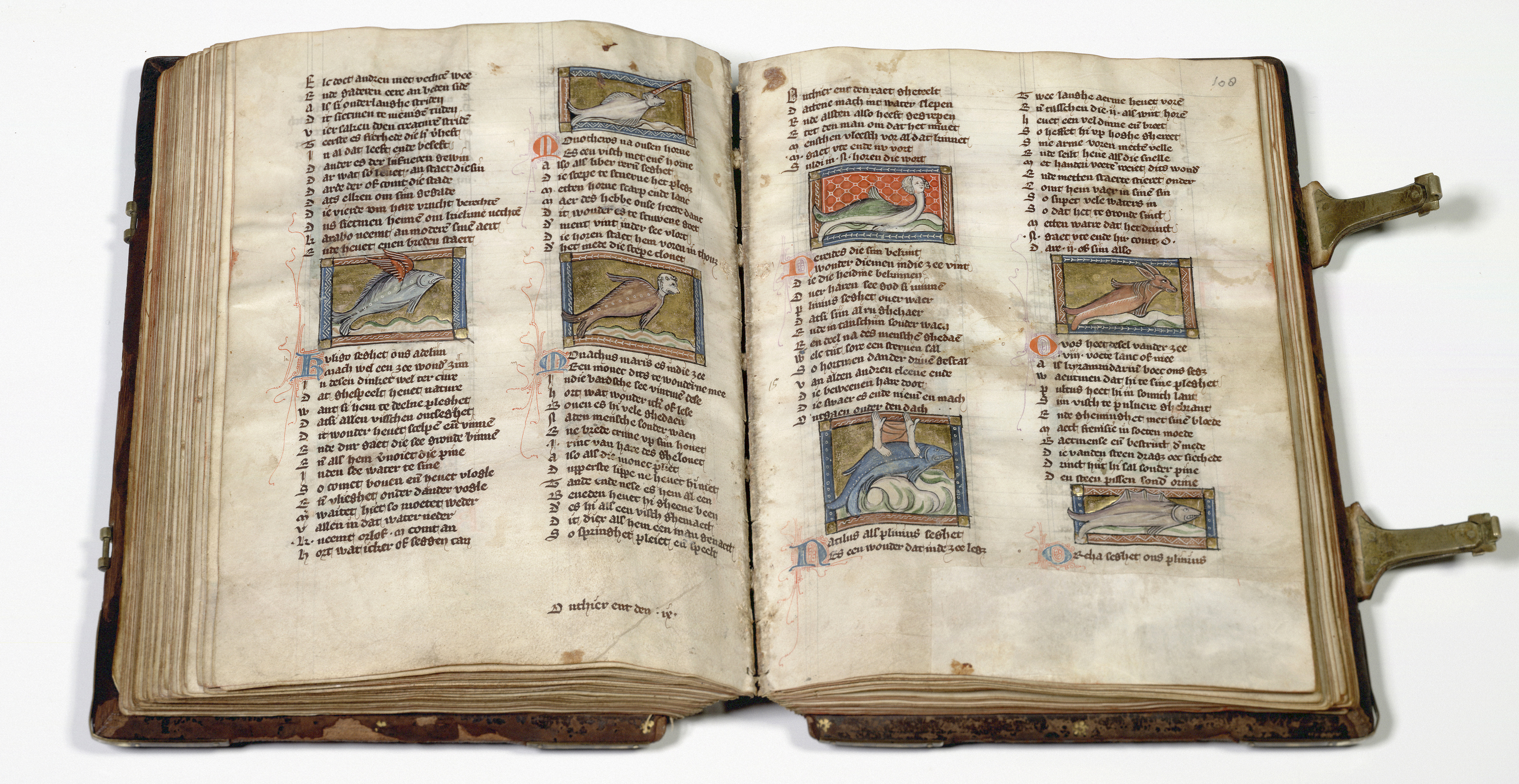
Der naturen bloeme, KB KA 16

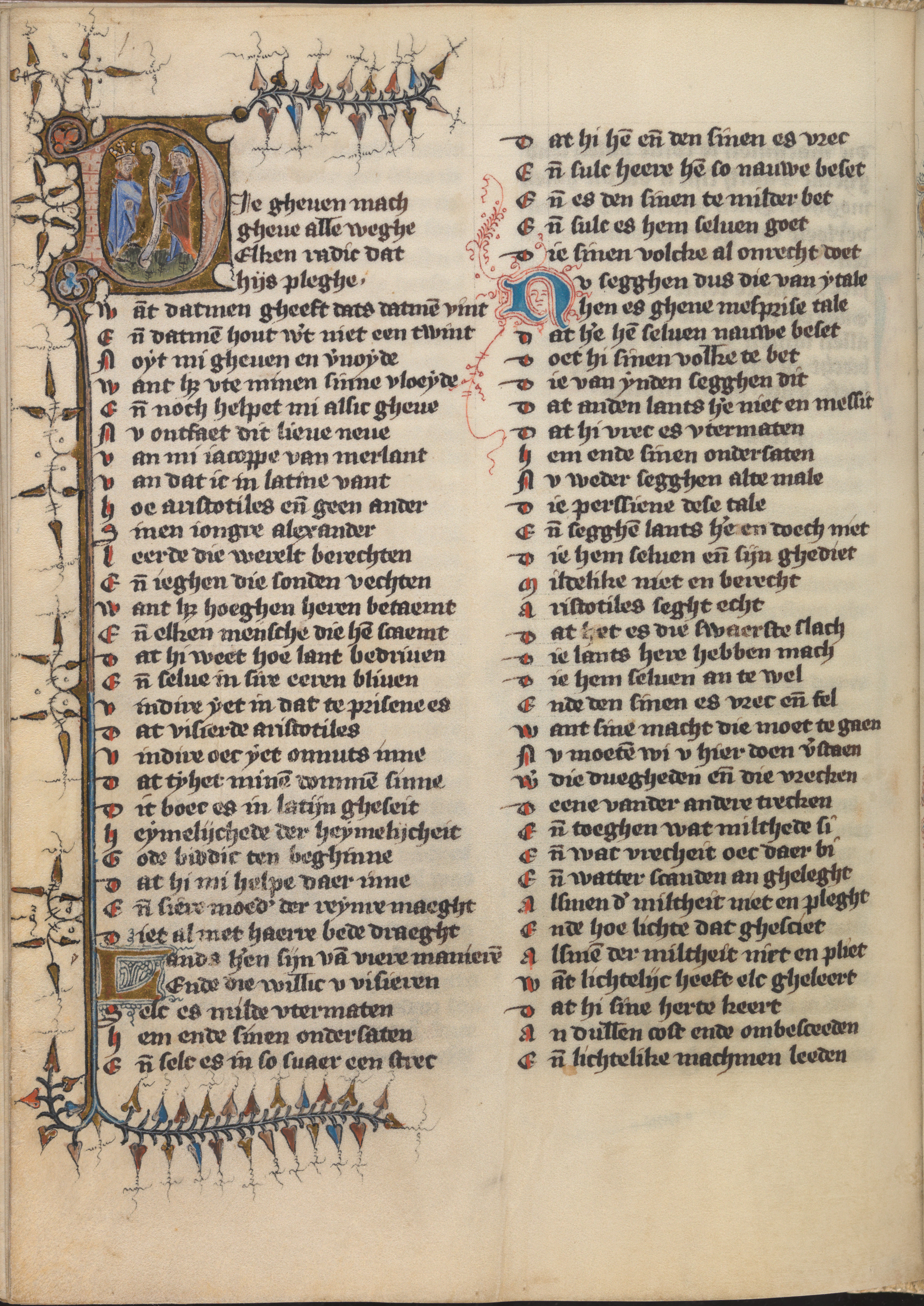
Beginning of Die Heimelicheit der heimelicheden - KB 76 E 5, folium 061v

- Alexanders Geesten
- Historie van den grale
- Merlijns boeck
- Istory van Troyen
- Der naturen bloeme
- Rijmbijbel
- Spieghel historiael
- Sinte Franciscus' Leven
- Wapene Martijn
- Tweede Martijn
- Van der Drievoudecheide
- Verkeerde Martijn
- Der Kerken claghe
- Van den lande van overzee
- Heimelykheid der heimelykheden
- Lapidarijs
- Leven van Ste. Clara
- Sompniariis
- Torec
- Van neghen den besten

== See also ==
- Dutch literature
- Flemish literature

== Bibliography ==
- Evert van den Berg, "Waar kwam Jacob van Maerlant vandaan?", in Amand Berteloot: Verslagen en mededelingen van de Koninklijke Academie voor Nederlandse taal- en letterkunde 1993, p. 30-77.
- Jos Biesmans, 'Het Gronings-Zutphense Maerlant-handschrift. Over de noodzakelijkheid der handschriftenkunde', in: Queeste 3 (1996), p. 107-219.
- Frits van Oostrom, Maerlants wereld. Amsterdam 1996.
- Karina van Dalen-Oskam, Studies over Jacob van Maerlants Rijmbijbel. Hilversum 1997.
- Ingrid Biesheuvel, Maerlants werk. Juweeltjes van zijn hand. Amsterdam 1998.
- Willem Kuiper, 'Die Destructie van Jherusalem in handschrift en druk', in: Voortgang, jaarboek voor de neerlandistiek 25 (2007), p. 67-88.
- Claudine A. Chavannes-Mazel, Maerlants Rijmbijbel in Museum Meermanno. De kracht van woorden, de pracht van beelden. Met vertalingen uit het Middelnederlands van het handschrift 10 B 21 door Karina van Dalen-Oskam en Willem Kuiper. Den Haag 2008.
