= 1257 in poetry =

This article covers 1257 in poetry.

== Works published ==
- The Bustan, a book of poetry, is completed by Saadi.

== Births ==
- Cecco d'Ascoli (died 1327), Italian encyclopaedist, physician and poet

== Deaths ==
- Yuan Haowen, Chinese Sanqu poetry writer (born 1190)
- Lanfranc Cigala, Genoese nobleman, knight, judge, and man of letters (died 1257 or 1258)
