= 1267 in poetry =

== Events ==
- Guiraut Riquier composes the pastorela L'autr' ier trobei la bergeira.

== Births ==
- James II of Aragon (died 1327), a Catalan king and troubadour
