= Johan Esteve de Bezers =

French troubadour

En Johan Esteve de Bezers, in modern orthography Joan Esteve (fl. 1270–1288), (Note: "En Johan" is Old Occitan for "Lord John") was a troubadour from Béziers. The only chansonnier which contains his eleven works, also calls him Olier de Bezers, implying that he was perhaps a potter. All his works are accompanied by dates of composition which allows scholars to place his literary output between 1270 and 1288.

Joan's work is pious and religious, but metrically complex, with difficult strophes (Lo senhor qu'es guitz being an example). He wrote three pastorelas, all following Guiraut Riquier in style. His indiscreet cansos are dominated by courtly love, wherein the object of his affection is a woman known as Bel rai ("beautiful sunbeam"). He is not a typical southern troubadour in that he was thoroughly Gallicised and his sympathies were for the French. He dedicated several works to Guilhem de Lodeva, the Provençal admiral of the French Mediterranean.

Joan's earliest work is Aissi quol malanans, a planh composed on the death of Amalric I of Narbonne (1270). In 1284 he wrote Quossi moria, a lament for the bloody incident that marred the feast of the Ascension in Béziers that year. In 1286 he composed his most historically interesting work, Francx reys Frances, per cuy son Angevi, the metre and rhyme of which are identical to that of Peridgon's Trop ai etat mon Bon Esper no vi. This was written in 1286, after the occasion of the Battle of Les Formigues in which Guilhem de Lodeva had been captured and imprisoned in Barcelona by the Aragonese, with which the French had been at war. It is a sirventes urging action on the part of the French king Philip IV to rescue Guilhem. According to Joan, Guilhem was only captured as a result of treachery by his own men. Guilhem's release was eventually negotiated and returned to Provence, where he died. A certain "Esteve", perhaps Joan, composed a partimen with a certain "Jutge" as a planh for his death.

Joan's last work was a pastorela, Ogan, ab freg que fazia, composed in 1288.

== Sources ==
- Riquer, Martín de. Los trovadores: historia literaria y textos. 3 vol. Barcelona: Planeta, 1975.
