= 1276 in poetry =

This article covers 1276 in poetry.

== Events ==
- 26 August — Matieu de Caersi composed a planh ("Tant suy marritz que no.m puese alegrar") on the death of James I of Aragon and so did Cerverí de Girona ("Si per tristor, per dol no per cossir")
- Guiraut Riquier composes the pastorela D'Astarac venia.

== Deaths ==
- Guido Guinizelli (born 1230), Italian poet and 'founder' of the Dolce Stil Novo
