= 1281 in poetry =

This article covers 1281 in poetry.

== Births ==
- Hamdollah Mostowfi (died 1349), Iranian historian, geographer and epic poet
