= 1278 in poetry =

== Events ==
- 24 August — Amanieu de Sescars wrote A vos, que ieu am deszamatz, a salut d'amor (love letter)

== Works published ==
- Fujiwara no Tameuji, editor, Shokushūi Wakashū (続拾遺和歌集, "Collection of Gleanings of Japanese Poems Continued"), an imperial anthology of Japanese waka; ordered by the Retired Emperor Kameyama about 1276, consisting of twenty volumes containing 1,461 poems

== Births ==
- Peire Cardenal (born 1180), an Occitan troubadour
- Ulrich von Liechtenstein (born 1200), a German Minnesänger

== Deaths ==
- Kokan Shiren (died 1347), Japanese Rinzai Zen patriarch and celebrated poet in Chinese
