= 1264 in poetry =

This article covers 1264 in poetry.

== Events ==
- Gaia, pastorela, a pastorela by Guiraut Riquier, composed.
- The Song of Lewes written circa this year.

== Deaths ==
- Gonzalo de Berceo (born 1190), Spanish poet especially on religious themes
