= 1269 in poetry =

This article covers 1269 in poetry.

== Events ==
- Folquet de Lunel, Dalfinet, and Cerverí de Girona in the paid service of Peter the Great

== Works published ==
- Estat aurai lonc temps en pessamen by Olivier lo Templier, celebrating the Crusade fleet of James the Conqueror, which left Barcelona that year

== Births ==
- Vedanta Desika, poet, devotee, philosopher and master-teacher (died c. 1370) (approximate date)
