= 1280 in poetry =

This article covers 1280 in poetry.

== Births ==
- Khwaju Kermani (died 1352), Persian Sufi
