= 1277 in poetry =

This article covers 1277 in poetry.

== Events ==
- Thomas Aquinas issued a condemnation by the bishop of France, Étienne Tempier
