= 1279 in poetry =

This article covers 1279 in poetry.

== Events ==
- The poet Philippe de Rémi becomes the bailli for the county of Beauvais
