= 1272 in poetry =

This article covers 1272 in poetry.

== Births ==
- Shiwu (died 1352), Chinese Chan poet and hermit.

== Deaths ==
- Enzo of Sardinia (born 1218), knight and general who wrote poems after being captured and imprisoned for more than 20 years.
