= 1266 in poetry =

This article covers 1266 in poetry.

== Events ==
- Dubsúilech Ó Maolconaire becomes Ollamh Síl Muireadaigh
- Bonifaci Calvo returns to Lombardy from Spain
- Rutebeuf writes Complainte du comte Eudes de Nevers, a lament for the death of Odo, Count of Nevers, defender of Acre

== Deaths ==
- Máeleoin Bódur Ó Maolconaire (born unknown), an Ollamh Síl Muireadaigh
