= 13th century in literature =

This article is a list of literary events and publications in the 13th century.

== Events ==
- 1202 – Leonardo Fibonacci writes Liber Abaci, about the modus Indorum, the Hindu–Arabic numeral system, including the use of zero; it is the first major work in Europe to move away from the use of Roman numerals.
- 1204 – The Imperial Library of Constantinople is destroyed by Christian knights of the Fourth Crusade and its contents burned or sold.
- 1211 – Hélinand of Froidmont begins compiling his Chronicon.
- 1215 – Bhiksu Ananda of Kapitanagar completes writing the Buddhist book Arya Astasahasrika Prajnaparamita (Sutra), in gold ink in Ranjana script.
- 1216 – Roger of Wendover, English monk and chronicler, at St Albans Abbey, begins to cover contemporary events, in his continuation of the chronicle Flores Historiarum.
- 1217 – Alexander Neckam, English scholar and theologian, writes De naturis rerum ("On the Nature of Things"), a scientific encyclopedia.
- 1220 – A new shrine built at Canterbury Cathedral in England to house the remains of St Thomas Becket quickly becomes one of Europe's major places of pilgrimage, and the destination of the fictional pilgrims in Geoffrey Chaucer's set of narrative poems The Canterbury Tales, written about 170 years later.
- 1226: By August – The biographical poem L'histoire de Guillaume le Maréchal, commissioned to commemorate William Marshal, 1st Earl of Pembroke (died 1219), a rare example at this time of a life of a lay person, is completed, probably by a Tourangeau layman called John in the southern Welsh Marches.
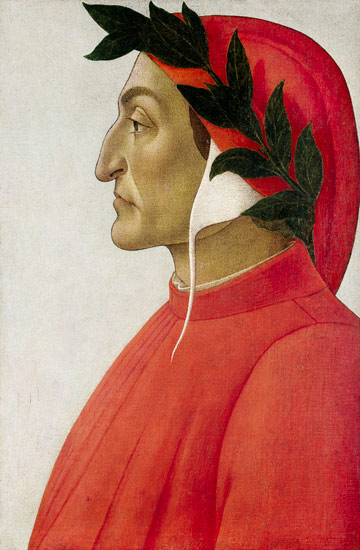
- Dante Alighieri was one of the most influential writers of the 13th century
  1240 – Albert of Stade joins the Franciscan order and begins his chronicle.
- 1249: September 27 – Chronicler Guillaume de Puylaurens is present at the death of Raymond VII of Toulouse.
- 1251 – The carving is completed of the Tripitaka Koreana, a collection of Buddhist scriptures recorded on some 81,000 wooden blocks, thought to have been started in 1236.
- 1258: February 13 – The House of Wisdom in Baghdad is destroyed by forces of the Mongol Empire after the Siege of Baghdad. The waters of the Tigris are said to have run black with ink from the huge quantities of books flung into it, and red from the blood of the philosophers and scientists killed.
- 1274: May 1 – In Florence, the nine-year-old Dante Alighieri first sees the eight-year-old Beatrice, his lifelong muse.
- 1276 – Merton College, Oxford, is first recorded as having a collection of books, making its Library the world's oldest in continuous daily use. During the first century of its existence the books are probably kept in a chest.
- 1283 – Ram Khamhaeng, ruler of the Sukhothai Kingdom, creates the Thai alphabet (อักษรไทย), according to tradition.
- 1289 – Library of the Collège de Sorbonne, earliest predecessor of the Bibliothèque de la Sorbonne, is founded in Paris.
- 1298–1299 – Marco Polo dictates his Travels to Rustichello da Pisa while in prison in Genoa, according to tradition.
- 1300, Easter – The events of Dante Alighieri's Divine Comedy take place.

== New works ==
- 13th century
  - Huon of Bordeaux
  - Sagas of Icelanders (Íslendingasögur)
  - Beatrice of Nazareth – Seven Ways of Holy Love, the earliest prose work in Dutch
  - Conrad of Saxony – Speculum Beatæ Mariæ Virginis
  - Śivadāsa – "The five and twenty tales of the genie" (version of the Baital Pachisi)
  - Zhou Mi – Miscellaneous observations from the year of Guixin (癸辛雜識)
- c. 1200
  - Layamon – Brut
  - Nibelungenlied
- Early 13th century
  - Ancrene Wisse
  - Færeyinga saga
  - Farid al-Din Attar – Mantiqu 't-Tayr (The Conference of the Birds)
  - Codex Gigas
  - Le Conte de Poitiers
  - Gautier de Coincy – Les miracles de Nostre-Dame
  - Anonymus (notary of Béla III) – Gesta Hungarorum
  - Guido delle Colonne – Historia destructionis Troiae
  - Hervarar saga ok Heiðreks (The Saga of Hervar and Heidrek)
  - Gerbert de Montreuil – Le Roman de la Violette
  - Raghavanka – Harishchandra Kavya
  - Jean Renart – Guillaume de Dole
  - Roi Flore et la belle Jeanne
  - Wolfram von Eschenbach – Parzival
- c. 1203 – Hartmann von Aue – Iwein
- 1205 – Lancelot-Grail
- 1205–1234 – Estoire d'Eracles (Old French translation of William of Tyre's Historia)
- c. 1208 – Saxo Grammaticus – Gesta Danorum
- c. 1210
  - Herbers – Li romans de Dolopathos (translation of Seven Wise Masters)
  - Raimon Vidal de Bezaudun – Razós de trobar
  - Gottfried von Strassburg – Tristan
- 1210–1225 – Sa'ad al-Din Varavini – Marzban-nama (مرزبان‌نامه)
- 1212 – Kamo no Chōmei (鴨 長明) – Hōjōki (方丈記, Account of a Ten-Foot-Square Hut)
- 1214 – Gervase of Tilbury – Otia Imperialia
- c. 1215
  - Bertrand de Bar-sur-Aube – Girard de Vienne
  - Rumi – Diwan-e Shams-e Tabrizi (masnavi in Persian)
- c. 1217–1235 – Andayya – Kabbigara Kava (Poets' Defender)
- c. 1217–1263 – Strengleikar, Old Norse translation of the Lais of Marie de France, perhaps (partly) by Brother Robert
- 1220 – Ibn Hammad – Akhbar muluk bani Ubayd
- c. 1220s – Snorri Sturlusson – Prose Edda
- c. 1225
  - Francis of Assisi – Laudes creaturarum or Cantico delle creature (Praise of God's creation), the oldest known Italian poetry
  - King Horn, the oldest known English verse romance
- 1225 or 1226 – L'Histoire de Guillaume le Marechal (early example of a political biography, in Norman French)
- 1227 – Brother Robert – Tristrams saga ok Ísöndar, an Old Norse translation of the Tristan and Iseult legend
- c. 1227 – Henry of Latvia – Livonian Chronicle of Henry
- c. 1230
  - La Mort le roi Artu, French prose romance
  - Guillaume de Lorris – First section of Romance of the Rose
  - Johannes de Sacrobosco – De sphaera mundi
  - Snorri Sturlusson – Heimskringla
- c. 1230s – Post-Vulgate Cycle
- Mainly before 1235 – Henry de Bracton – De Legibus et Consuetudinibus Angliae (The Laws and Customs of England)
- c. 1240
  - Bartholomeus Anglicus – De proprietatibus rerum
  - Egil's Saga
  - Johannes de Garlandia – De Mensurabili Musica
  - Rudolf von Ems – Alexanderroman
- c. 1240–1250 – Roger Bacon – Summa Grammatica
- mid-13th century
  - Black Book of Carmarthen completed
  - Doön de Mayence
  - Franco of Cologne – Ars cantus mensurabilis
  - Jean de Mailly – Chronica universalis Mettensis
  - Old incidents in the Xuanhe period of the great Song Dynasty (大宋宣和遺事)
- c. 1250 – Willem die Madoc maecte – Van den vos Reynaerde
- 1250s – Stephen of Bourbon – De septem donis Spiritus Sancti
- c. 1250–1266 – Poema de Fernán González
- c. 1250–1282 – Mechthild of Magdeburg – Das fließende Licht der Gottheit (The Flowing Light of Divinity; originally composed in Middle Low German)
- 1252
  - Calyla e Dymna, translation of the Panchatantra into Castilian
  - Jikkunshō
- After 1255 – Epic of Sundiata, in Mandinka oral tradition
- 1258–1273 – Rumi – Masnavi
- 1259 – Bonaventure – Itinerarium Mentis ad Deum (Journey of the Mind to God)
- c. 1259–1265 – Thomas Aquinas – Summa contra Gentiles
- c. 1259–1266 – Jacobus de Voragine – Golden Legend (Legenda sanctorum)
- completed 1260 – Minhaj-i-Siraj – Tabaqat-i Nasiri
- c. 1260
  - Le Récit d'un ménestrel de Reims
  - Sa'di – Gulistan, Bustan poets and texts in Persian
- 1263 – Bonaventure – Life of St. Francis of Assisi
- c. 1263 – Jacob van Maerlant – Der Naturen Bloeme
- c. 1264 – Jacob van Maerlant – De Spieghel Historiael
- 1265
  - Book of Aneirin (written or copied at about this date)
  - Shokukokin Wakashū (続古今和歌集, Collection of Ancient and Modern Times Continued, completed)
- c. 1268–1285 – Jean de Meun – Second section of Romance of the Rose
- c. 1270
  - Ibn al-Nafis – Theologus Autodidactus
  - John of Capua – Directorium Vitae Humanae, translation of the Panchatantra
  - Poetic Edda written in Codex Regius, including Hávamál and Völwpá
- c. 1270–1278 – Witelo – Perspectiva
- 1274
  - Joseph ben Abraham Gikatilla – Ginnat Egoz (Garden of Nuts)
  - Bonvesin da la Riva – Libro de le tre scritture (Negra, Rubra, Aurea; Western Lombard)
- late 13th century
  - Amir Khusrow – The Tale of the Four Dervishes (Persian: قصه چهار درویش, Ghesseh-ye Chahār Darvīsh)
  - Njáls saga
- c. 1280
  - Bernard of Besse – Liber de Laudibus Beati Francisci
  - Il-yeon – Samguk yusa
  - Heinrich der Vogler – Dietrichs Flucht
- c. 1280s
  - Havelok the Dane
  - The Owl and the Nightingale
  - 'Anonymous IV' – Concerning the Measurement of Polyphonic Song
- 1283
  - Ramon Llull – Blanquerna
  - Mujū – Shasekishū
- 1288 – Bonvesin da la Riva – De magnalibus urbis Mediolani (On the Marvels of Milan)
- 1288–1289 – Amir Khusrow – Qiran-us-Sa’dain (Meeting of the Two Auspicious Stars – masnavi)
- c. 1290s – "Sir Patrick Spens" (Scottish ballad)
- 1290–1291
  - Dnyaneshwar – Dnyaneshwari
  - Amir Khusrow – Miftah-ul-Futooh (Key to the Victories – masnavi)
- 1293 – Dante Alighieri – La Vita Nuova
- 1294 – Amir Khusrow – Ghurratul-Kamal (diwan)
- c. 1295 – Mathieu of Boulogne – Liber lamentationum Matheoluli (Book of the Lamentations of Matheolus)
- 1298
  - Amir Khusrow – Khamsa-e-Nizami
  - Gertrude the Great (begins) – Legatus Memorialis Abundantiae Divinae Pietatis (The Herald of Divine Love)
- 1299 – Rustichello da Pisa – The Travels of Marco Polo
- c. 1300
  - Cursor Mundi
  - Gesta Romanorum

== New drama ==
- The Orphan of Zhao (趙氏孤兒 Zhaoshi guer)
- c. 1262 – Adam de la Halle – Le jeu Adan (or Le jeu de la Feuillee, satire)
- c. 1282–3 – Adam de la Halle – Jeu de Robin et Marion (Picard language play with music)
- c. 1300 – The Interlude of the Student and the Girl (Interludium de clerico et puella)

== Births ==
- c. 1200 – Matthew Paris, English chronicler and monk (died 1259)
- 1200 – Rudolf von Ems, German nobleman, knight and poet (d. 1254)
- 1205 – Tikkana, Telugu poet (died 1288)
- 1207: September 9 – Rumi, Persian poet (died 1273)
- c. 1210 – Henry de Bracton, English cleric and jurist (died c. 1268)
- c. 1212 – Ibn Sahl of Seville, poet (died 1251)
- 1214 – Sturla Þórðarson, Icelandic writer of sagas and politician (died 1284)
- 1225: January 28 – Thomas Aquinas, Italian philosopher and theologian (died 1274)
- c. 1230–1240 – Jacob van Maerlant, Flemish poet and writer in Middle Dutch (died c. 1288–1300)
- 1240 or 1241 – Mechtilde, German religious writer and saint (died 1298)
- 1248 – Angela of Foligno Italian mystic and saint (died 1309)
- 1265 – Dante Alighieri, Italian poet (died 1321)
- 1266 (probable) – Duns Scotus, Scottish philosopher and theologian (died 1308)
- 1275 – Dnyaneshwar, Maharashtrian sant and writer (died 1296)
- 1279 – Muktabai, Maharashtrian sant and Abhang poet (died 1297)
- c. 1280 – Ranulf Higden, English chronicler and Benedictine monk (died 1364)
- 1283 (approximate)
  - Juan Ruiz, Archpriest of Hita, Castilian poet (died c. 1350)
  - Yoshida Kenkō (吉田 兼好), Japanese author and Buddhist monk (died c. 1350)
- 1287: January 24 – Richard de Bury, English bishop and bibliophile (died 1345)
- 1293 or 1294 – John of Ruysbroeck (Jan van Ruysbroeck), Flemish mystic (died 1381)
- Unknown year – Thomas the Rhymer, Scottish laird and prophet

== Deaths ==
- Unknown – Palkuriki Somanatha, Telugu, Kannada and Sanskrit poet
- 1209
  - Nizami Ganjavi, Seljuk Empire Persian romantic epic poet (born c. 1141)
  - December 29 – Lu You, Chinese poet (born 1125)
- c. 1210 – Gottfried von Strassburg, German writer
- 1212 – Adam of Dryburgh, Anglo-Scots theologian (born c. 1140)
- 1223 – Gerald of Wales, Cambro-Norman churchman and topographer (born c. 1146)
- 1228 (probable) – Gervase of Tilbury, English lawyer, statesman and writer (born c. 1150)
- 1241: September 23 – Snorri Sturluson, Icelandic historian, poet, and politician (born 1179)
- 1241: September 26 – Fujiwara no Teika (藤原定家), Japanese waka poet, calligrapher, novelist, and scholar (born 1162)
- 1251
  - Ibn Sahl of Seville, poet (born c. 1212)
  - (probable) – Albertanus of Brescia, Latin prose writer (born c. 1195)
- 1252 (probable) – Alberic of Trois-Fontaines, Cistercian chronicler
- 1253: October 9 – Robert Grosseteste, English churchman and scholar (born c. 1175)
- 1259: June – Matthew Paris, English chronicler and monk (born c. 1200)
- 1268 – Henry de Bracton, English writer and jurist (born c. 1210)
- 1273: December 17 – Rumi, Persian poet (born 1207)
- 1274
  - March 7 – Thomas Aquinas, Italian philosopher and theologian (born 1225)
  - July 12 – Bonaventure, philosopher and theologian
- 1285 – Rutebeuf, French trouvère (probable; born c. 1245)
- 1287: August 31 – Konrad von Würzburg, German poet
- 1294
  - Roger Bacon, English scholar (born c. 1214)
  - Guittone d'Arezzo, Tuscan poet (born c. 1235)
- 1298: July 13 or 16: Jacobus de Voragine, archbishop of Genoa and chronicler (born c. 1230)

== See also ==
- 13th century in poetry
- 12th century in literature
- 14th century in literature
- List of years in literature
