= Sirventes =

Genre of Occitan poetry

The sirventes or serventes (Old Occitan: [siɾvenˈtes]), sometimes translated as 'service song', was a genre of Old Occitan lyric poetry practiced by the troubadours.

The name comes from sirvent ('serviceman'), from whose perspective the song is allegedly written. Sirventes usually (possibly, always) took the form of parodies, borrowing the melody, metrical structure and often even the rhymes of a well-known piece to address a controversial subject, often a current event. The original piece was usually a canso, but there are sirventes written as contrafacta of (at least) sestinas and pastorelas.

They were always opinionated, being either highly complimentary or, more often, oozing with vitriol; however, these features are not unique to the sirventes, so a piece can be positively identified as one only if its nature is explicitly stated in the text (which it often is) or the original piece it is based on has been preserved (which is also often the case: for a parody to work, it had to target a recognizable, therefore widely known, piece).

The first author known to have written a sirventes is Cercamon, the name of the genre was first mentioned by Marcoat, and the most famous practitioner of it was Bertran de Born; Peire de Vic was also known for his sirventes, but only one has survived to this day.

== Examples ==
Most major troubadours have written at least one sirventes; well-known examples include:

- Leus sonetz by Raimbaut de Vaqueiras, a political piece built on the structure of Giraut de Bornelh's ''Los apleiz' and using the same rhymes as the original
- Un sirventes vuelh far dels auls glotos by Peire Cardenal, one of many criticizing simony
- Ben grans avoleza intra by Bertran de Born; this is built on the structure of Arnaut Daniel's famous sestina, Lo ferm voler qu'el cor m'intra, and uses all the same end-words as the original.
- Cansoneta leu e plana by Guilhem de Berguedan, one of a cycle devoted to personal attacks against Pons de Mataplana
- Pos Peire d'Alvernh' a chantat by Peire de Vic, built on the meter (but not the rhymes) of Cantarai d'aqestz trobadors by Peire d'Alvernha, is an important source about 12th century troubadours, many of whom it makes fun of.

== Legacy ==
The sirventes, called sirventesch in early Catalan, was imported into that language in the fourteenth century, and it developed into a unique didactic/moralistic type.

It also spread to Northern France, and became known as serventois in the langues d'oïl. Dalfin je us voill desrenier by Richard I of England is a notable example of a sirventes written in Old French.
