= Guiraut Riquier =

Occitan poet and composer

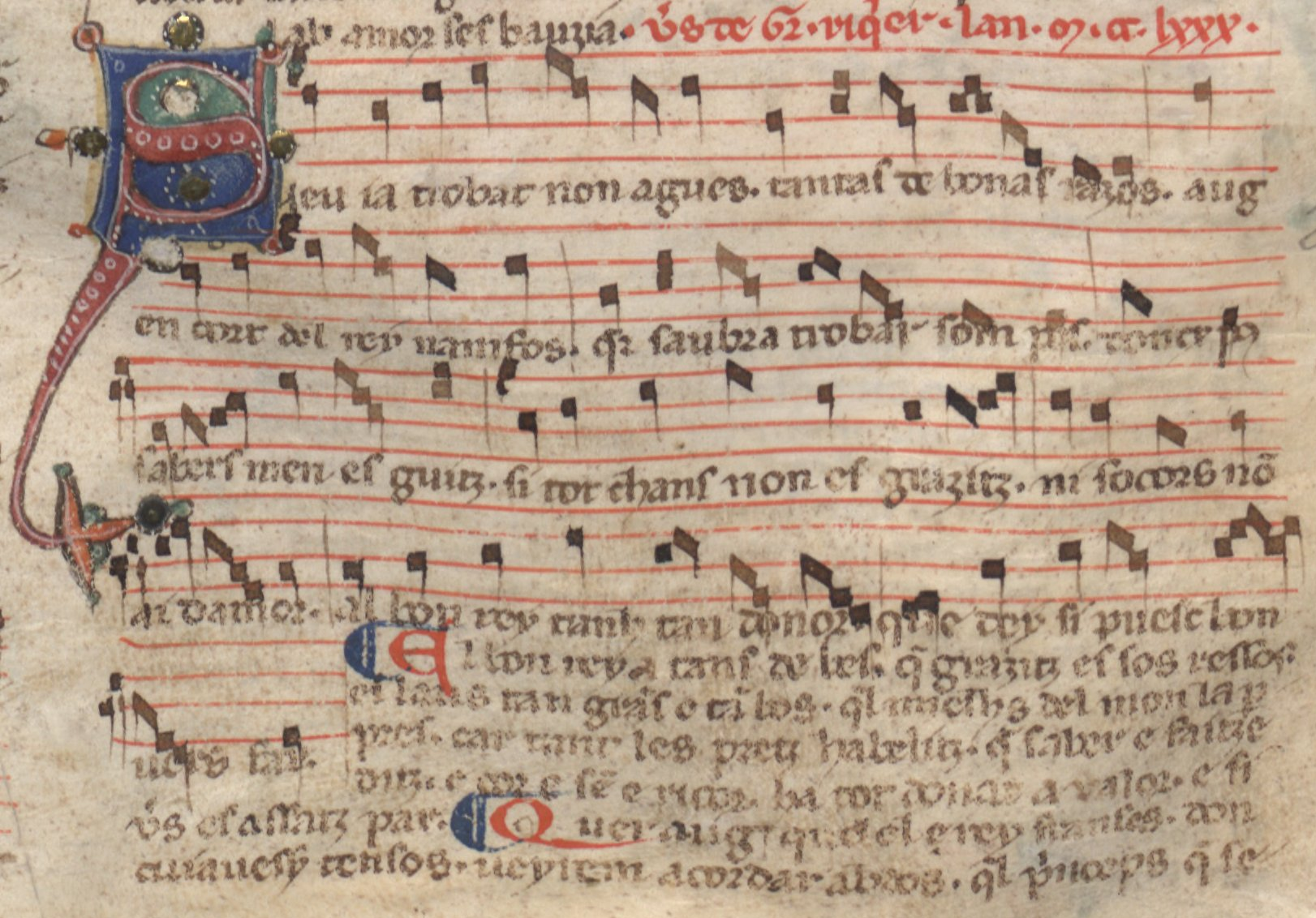
Song of Riquier in a 13th-century chansonnier.

Guiraut Riquier de Narbona (c. 1230 in Narbonne – 1292 in Narbonne or Rodez) is among the last of the Occitan troubadours. He is well known because of his great care in writing out his works and keeping them together—The New Grove Dictionary of Music and Musicians considers him an "anthologist" of his own works. Riquier is also remarkable for having introduced new genres and variants of existing ones, as in the pseudo-alba, the first example of the later serenade.

He served under Aimery IV, Viscount of Narbonne, as well as Alfonso el Sabio, King of Castile. He is also believed to have worked under Henry II, Count of Rodez. He composed a partimen with the Jewish troubadour Bonfilh. He invented the genre of the serena (evening song).

== Works ==
- Guiraut Riquier: Humils, forfaitz, repres e penedens... in Dietmar Rieger, ed. & transl., Mittelalterliche Lyrik Frankreichs 1. Lieder der Trobadors. Zweisprachig Provençalisch – Deutsch. Reclams Universal-Bibliothek No. 7620, Stuttgart 1980 (Guiraut: p. 288 – 233, commentary from Rieger 314–316, Literature) ISBN 3-15-007620-X In German and Occitan
