= Cançoneret de Ripoll =

The Cançoneret de Ripoll (Catalan pronunciation: [kənsunəˈɾɛd də riˈpoʎ], Latin: Carmina Riulpullensa), now manuscript 129 of Ripoll in the Arxiu de la Corona d'Aragó, is a short Catalan-Occitan chansonnier produced in the mid-fourteenth century but after 1346, when Peter IV of Aragon held a poetry competition which is mentioned in the chansonnier. Influenced by Cerverí de Girona, the chansonnier and its ideology serve as transition in the history of Catalan literature between the dominance of the troubadours and the new developments of Ausiàs March.

The provenance of the manuscript has been debated. Arguments in favour of an origin with the monastic community of Ripoll, where the manuscript is first recorded in the library before heading to the archives in Barcelona, include the use of Latin headings to introduce some of the poems and the abundance of authors of clerical background cited. On the other hand, an aristocratic or "courtly" provenance has been taught, notably by Martín de Riquer, on the basis of the references to Peter, Count of Ribagorza, to people and places in the County of Roussillon and the Kingdom of Majorca, and evidence of Goliardic influence.

The Cançoneret contains a copy of the Regles de trobar of Jaufre de Foixa and an anonymous untitled continuation thereof, dealing mainly with poetic genre and form. Eighteen complete poems and one fragment accompany the grammatical treatise to illustrate the points. All the cited poets are Catalans but only five or six are named. The generic classifications of the Cançoneret follow those of the Doctrina de compondre dictats, possibly of Raimon Vidal, and the "rules" of the Consistori del Gay Saber, codified in the Leys d'amors. The following genres are recognised: cançó, tençó, sirventès (serventesch), cobles d'acuyndamens, cobles de qüestions, vers, dança (dans), desdança (desdansa), and viadera. The Cançoneret confirms that the vers was merely a canso de matèria tota moral (of entirely moral material) and that the viadera (traveller's song) was la pus jusana spècies qui és en los cantàs (the most humble genre of song there is). The distinction between cobles, exchanges of stanzas between troubadours, that are d'acuyndamens and those de qüestions is unique to the Cançoneret. Cobles d'acuyndamens broke bonds of vassalage, love, or fidelity.

Among the classical troubadours cited by the treatise are Guillem de Cabestany, Raimbaut de Vaqueiras, Arnaut Daniel, Peire Cardenal, and Folquet de Marselha (though the reference is a mistake, the poet should be Pons Fabre d'Uzès). Among the named Catalan poets whose pieces are preserved as exemplars are Dalmau de Castellnou, Pere Alamany, and the Capellà de Bolquera. The incipit of another Catalan piece, De l'ordre suy de noble infant En Pedro, by Pere de Vilademany is also mentioned in the treatise. There are several unidentifiable authors with works in the Cançoneret: a "poeta anònim" (anonymous poet), a "frare" (friar), "dos frares" (two friars), a "monja" (nun), "frayr'Uguó, prior" (brother Hugh, prior), "Francesc", and an "arxiprest" (archpriest).
