= Torneyamen =

Genre of Occitan poetry shaped as a competition

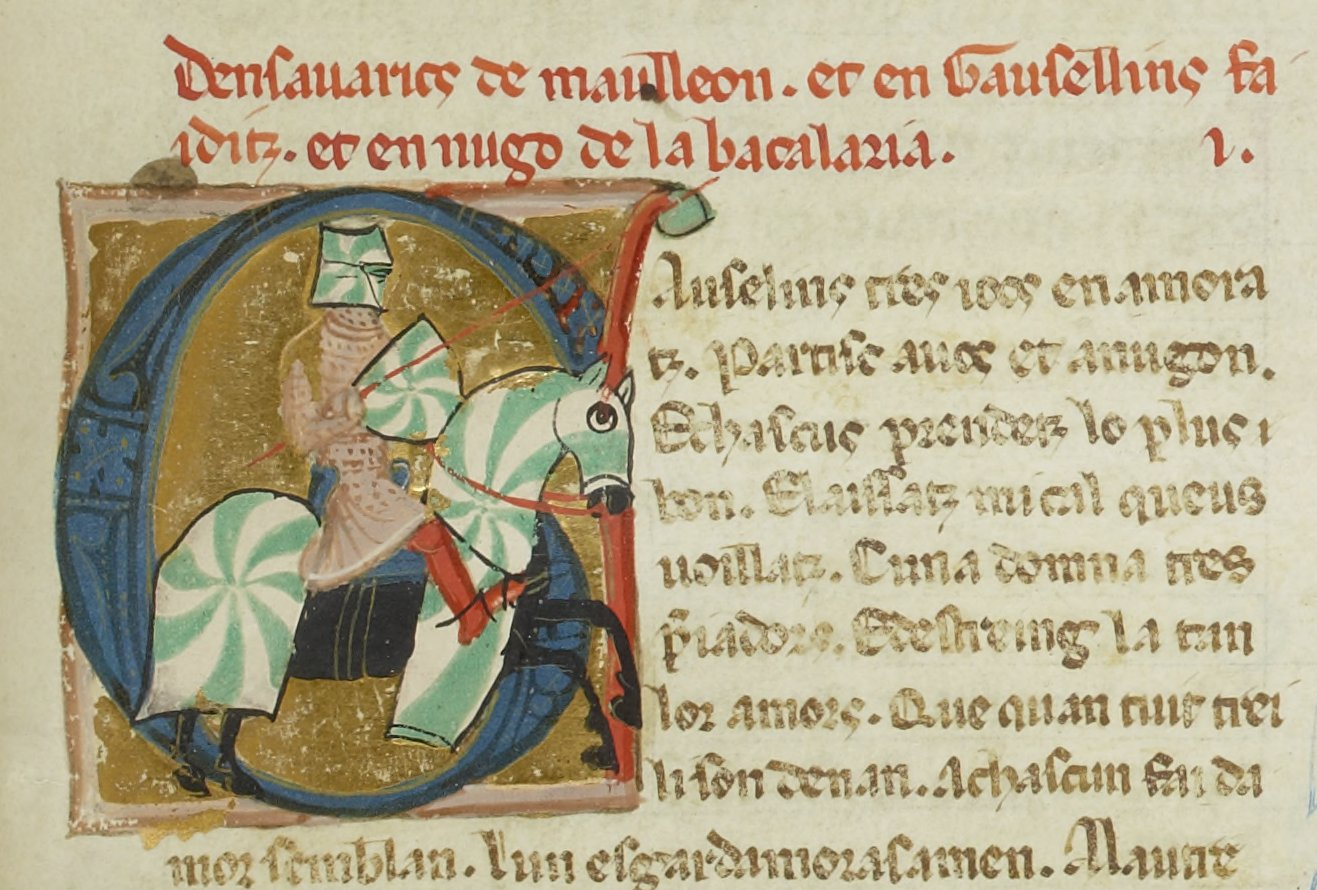
A miniature illustration of a knight next to the text of the torneyamen between Savaric de Malleo, Gaucelm Faidit and Uc de la Bacalaria.

A torneyamen (Occitan: [tuɾnejɔˈmen, tuʀnejɔˈme]; Catalan: tornejament [tuɾnəʒəˈmen, toɾnedʒaˈmen]; "tournament") or certamen was a lyric genre of the troubadours of the thirteenth century. Closely related to the tenso, a debate between two poets, and the partimen, a question posed by one poet and another's response, the torneyamen took place between several poets, originally usually three. The first three-way tenso was initiated by Raimbaut de Vaqueiras with Ademar de Peiteus and Perdigon. These wider tensos only became known as torneyamens later. A tenso or partimen that was submitted to another troubadour for adjudication may have a poetic jutjamen (judgement) attached to it and so may be considered as a torneyamen between three. The torneyamen, like the related debate forms, was probably especially common at contests, such as floral games and puys. Many such tensos and partimens come with attached jutjamens rendered in verse, as in the example Senyer Bernatz, dues puncelhas say cited below.

== Examples ==
- Senher n'Aymar, chauzes de tres baros between Raimbaut de Vaqueiras, Perdigon, and Ademar de Peiteus
- Senhe n'Enric, us reys un ric avar between Guiraut Riquier, Enric de Rodez, and Peire Pelet
- Senhe n'Austorc d'Alboy, lo coms plazens between Guiraut Riquier, Austorc d'Alboy, and Enric de Rodez
- A·n Miquel de Castilho between Guiraut Riquier, Miquel de Castilho, and Codolet
- De so don yeu soy doptos between Guillem de Mur, Guiraut Riquier, Enric de Rodez, and Marques de Canillac
- Guiraut Riquier, segon vostr'essien between Guillem de Mur and Guiraut Riquier, judged by Enric de Rodez
- Senh'en Jorda, sie·us manda Livernos between Guiraut Riquier, Jordan IV of L'Isle-Jourdain, Raimon Izarn, and Paulet de Marseilla
- Senhe n'Enric, a vos don avantatje between Guiraut Riquier, Enric de Rodez, and Marques de Canillac, judged by Peire d'Estanh
- Gaucelm, tres jocs enamoratz between Gaucelm Faidit, Uc de la Bacalaria, and Savaric de Malleo
- Senyer Bernatz, dues puncelhas say between Jacme Rovira and Bernat de Palaol, judged by Germà de Gontaut and Ramon Galbarra
