= Bonfilh =

Jewish troubadour

Bonfilh's stanzas (2, 6 and 8)

Guiraut, I sing to make my heart rejoice
And for love of one who keeps me happy,
And because I like honor and joy and youth;
But I'd never sing only for money,
Nor do I seek it; I'd rather give it to you,
For I give generously, all for the love of my lady,
Who is clever and worthy and pretty and gay.
Because she smiles so sweetly to me, I sing.

Since you're leaving love to deliver a sermon,
Set speech aside and put on a white robe [vest blanc vestimen],
Guiraut, and we'll have a spitting contest [esputamen],
For my lady declines to worship a cross.
If there were any love or courtesy in you,
You wouldn't think it foolish to use the word tu.
Since love wants lovers to call each other tu,
You've simply no reason to stew.

I leave this tensó; I'll answer you no more,
Since reason fails you and you speak villainy.
I let it drop out of respect for my lord Bertran
Of Opian, who is prosperous in love.

Bonfilh or Bonfils (meaning "godson") was a Jewish troubadour from Narbonne. He is the only known Jew who wrote in the troubadour style and language, Old Occitan. His only known work is a partimen (debate) with Guiraut Riquier, Auzit ay dir, Bofil, que saps trobar ("I hear tell, Bonfilh, that you know how to compose"). It has been suggested that Bonhilh may have been a poetic invention of Guiraut and not a historical person, or that he was the same person as the Jewish poet Abraham Bedersi. There is a lacuna in the only surviving manuscript version of this song that lasts from the middle of the third stanza through to the middle of the fifth. The seventh stanza is also missing the ending of its final line. Each stanza has eight lines, but the last two are tornadas of four each.

The poem starts off amicably, but ends on bad terms, with Guiraut resorting to antisemitism (he names Bonfilh as having hurt Jesus). Riquier poses a polylemma for his debate partner: does Bonfilh sing out of fear, because a lady makes him do it, "to ply the joglar's trade" (that is, for money), or to advance his fame? Bonfilh's responds that it is out of joy and for his lady that he sings. He also reproaches Guiraut for using the formal second-person pronoun vos with his lady, while he, Bonfilh, uses the familiar and intimate tu. This is unusual, however, as the troubadours universally use vos with ladies (even those of low rank, as in pastorelas). It is not a Jewish custom, as the fourteenth-century Roman de la Reine Esther by Crescas Caslari puts vos in the mouth of the king, Assuérus, when addressing Esther. Both Guiratu and Bonfilh submit their partimen to Bertran d'Opian (fl. 1229–42), a knight of Narbonne, for judgement. He was known to Guiraut.
