= Pere de Queralt =

Spanish noble and diplomat

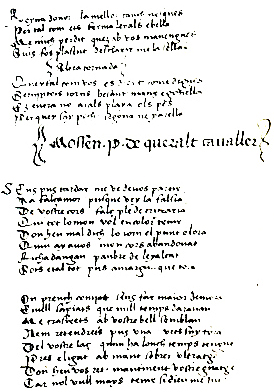
A maldit-comiat ascribed to Mossen Pere de Queralt cavaller: "Sir Pere de Queralt, knight"

Pere VI de Queralt (Catalan pronunciation: [ˈpeɾə ðə kəˈɾal]; died 1408) was a Catalan nobleman, diplomat, and poet; "una destacada figura del seu temps" (a distinguished figure of his age). He was the nephew of Guerau de Queralt, husband of Clemença de Perellós, and lord of Santa Coloma. He is not to be confused with the knight Pere de Queralt of the thirteenth century, who reportedly fought a lion and won: an act commemorated in a carved vault keystone in the church of Santa Maria de Bell-lloc in Santa Coloma.

In 1389 Pere was one of the barons that revolted against John I at Calasanç after having signed the sentence against Carroça de Vilaragut. Pere joined the rebels in order to advance his stepmother and sister-in-law, Lionor de Perellós, who was subsequently raised to Carroça's former position.

In 1392 Pere participated in an expedition to Sicily. In 1397, after becoming a councillor and chamberlain of the king, he went on a diplomatic mission to Rome to participate in negotiations to resolve the Western Schism. There he probably first encountered Italian literature. In July that same year, the king received a petition for aid from some Christian captives held at Tunis. When Pere returned to Valencia from Rome in January 1398 he was immediately sent, with one galley, to Tunis to negotiate their freedom. This he successfully did by promising to restore some sacred Muslim objects taken during the sack of Torreblanco. In 1398 he actively supported the Crusade waged by Martin of Aragon against the Berbers in Africa. In April 1399 and then in 1402–3 he was again ambassador to Tunis. This last embassy resulted in a peace treaty, but the rescue of only a select few captives. Pere died in 1408.

Pere left behind a sizable collection of books, which were catalogued by his widow. The record indicates that Pere owned several Old French books: a Lancelot, a Roman de la Rose, three chansonniers, a Tristan, and a Remey d'amor, probably a translation of Ovid's Remedia amoris. As a poet himself, Pere was also interested in works of grammar and language. His library included the Razos de trobar of Raimon Vidal de Bezaudun and the Libre de concordances (or Diccionari de rims) of Jaume March II.

Pere as poet has left us only one piece, Sens pus tardar me ve de vos partir (or Ses pus tardar me ve de vós partir). The language of the poem is unique, consisting of a Catalan base which has accrued a patina of Occitanisms. The poem is a harsh and violent maldit-comiat, in which Pere accuses his lady of having three lovers in a single day. When Pere takes leave of his lady, he does so with a metaphor of the rabasta. He will not sing for his lady any more "cançó, dansa ni lai", since she has turned such things into a rabasta, the part of saddle that wraps around a horse's posterior between its tail and its buttocks. The reference suggests that Pere composed songs previously, and in the French tradition, though none survive. Sens pus tardar me ve de vos partir is written in an Italian style (though not an Italian tone). Pere seems to have been inspired by the sonnet Benedetto sia'l giorno e'l mese e l'anno by Petrarch. Pere is one of the first Italianate writers of Catalonia, yet his style cannot be called Petrarchan because of its brazen tone; rather it is a parody of Petrarch.
