= Peire de Ladils =

Peire de Ladils de Bazas (Occitan pronunciation: [ˈpejɾe ðe laˈðilz ðe ˈβazɔs]; fl. c. 1325–1355) was a Gascon troubadour associated with the Consistori del Gay Saber in Toulouse. He was from Bazas in the Gironde and he served as advocate for the Cathédrale Saint-Jean-Baptiste. His surviving work comprises four cansos, three dansas, and two partimens.

In 1340 he composed a political partimen with Raimon de Cornet. He, and presumably Raimon also, was apparently well-read in the romantic literature of his time. His partimen directed to Raimon contains references to Charlemagne, Roland, Jaufre, Launcelot, Gawain, and Matfre Ermengaud:

Mossen Ramons, Carle, Rotlan, Jaufre,
ni Lansalot, ni Galvan, ni Matfre
no vi luns oms ferm guerreiar d'assier
mielhs que faran li Frances dreyturier
ab Lengadoc, si no.y ve passiensa.
