= Phagotum =

The phagotum (also phagotus) was a musical instrument, invented around 1520 by Canon Afranio of Ferrara (circa 1489–circa 1565) in Pannonia. Similar to the piva, it was a kind of bellows‐blown bagpipe. It is not related with the bassoon (fagott), the only feature in common being the use of parallel bores.
