= Uc Catola =

Uc (or Ugo) Catola was a knight and early troubadour, possibly a participant in the Second Crusade and perhaps later a monk.

Uc composed what is possibly the first tenso with his famous contemporary Marcabru: Amics Marchabrun, which concerned the nature of love. Uc argued that it was good and noble, while Marcabru railed against the decline of courtly standards. Uc employs the device of ironia (irony) to ridicule Marcabru's position, borrowing a page from Marcabru's own extensive work. Though the opinions of the poets were real, the composition arose out of friendly collaboration and the jongleuresque insults are playful. It has been suggested that the tenso is in fact the sole work of Marcabru, but more likely Uc is deliberately imitating the master's style. According to Meneghetti, the debating style may be influenced by Peter Abelard's Sic et Non.

Roncaglia identified Uc with the charissimo amico nostro domno Hugoni Catulae, recipient of a letter from Peter the Venerable in 1134/5. Peter urged Uc to keep his vow to enter a monastery instead of merely taking a pilgrimage to Jerusalem. Based on Uc's apparent attitude at the time of Peter's letter, which he dated to 1134/5, Roncaglia hypothesised that the tenso, which has a different tenor, must have been written some time before, c. 1133. However, the dating of the letter is far from certain (it may correspond to the Second Crusade) and therefore Uc's tenso's place as the first of the genre is unsure. Cercamon composed a tenso datable to 1137.

Besides his work with Marcabru, Uc may be the author of two surviving coblas esparsas of a comjat preserved in troubadour MS D, dated to 1254 and now in the Biblioteca Estense in Modena, Italy.
