= Jaume Rovira =

Jaume Rovira may refer to:

- Jacme Rovira, Catalan poet
- Jaume Rovira (cyclist) (born 1979), Spanish racing cyclist
