= Uc de la Bacalaria =

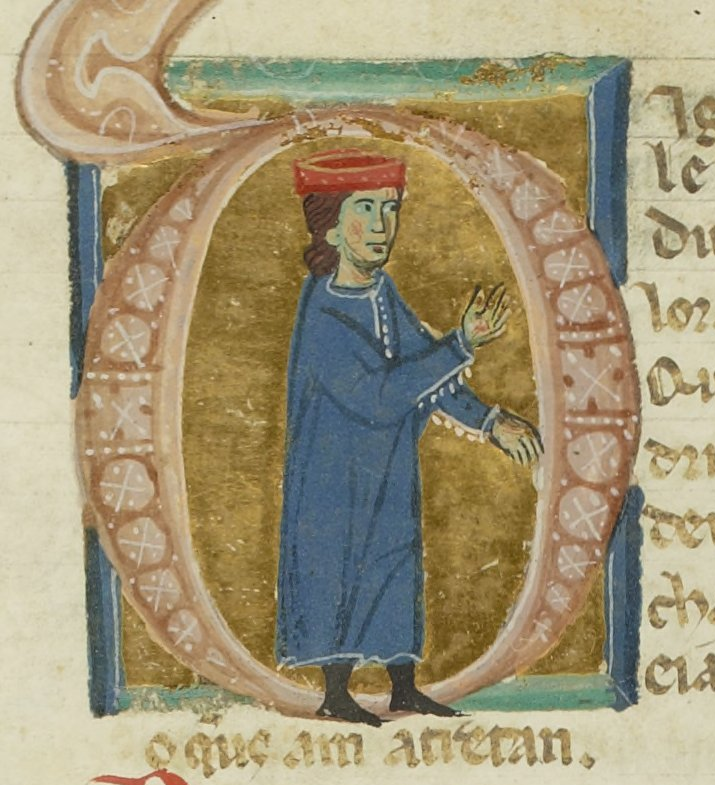
Uc, from a 13th-century chansonnier

Uc de la Bacalaria (fl. 1206) was a Limousin troubadour from La Bachellerie near Uzerche, the home town of Gaucelm Faidit. According to his vida, he was a jongleur who travelled infrequently and was hardly known. He composed cansos, tensos, one alba, and one descort. Six songs are surviving: one canso, one alba, and four tensos (three partimens and one torneyamen). According to the vida, he was courtly, capable, and learned.

Uc participated in a three-way torneyamen with Savaric de Malleo and Gaucelm Faidit. Savaric posed the dilemma: if a lady with three suitors gazes into the eyes of one, squeezes the hand of the other, and nudges the foot of the third, to whom did she show the truest affection? Uc's answer is that the suitor whose hand was grasped was her true love, for a lady's gaze can rest on anything. Uc wrote another partimen with Gaucelm and two others with Bertran de Sant Felitz.

Uc also wrote an erotic alba, Per grazir la bon' estrena, in which, like his contemporary Guiraut Riquier, he desires the dawn to arrive, in contrast to earlier troubadours, who always dreaded the dawn and the jealous husband. Both troubadours appear to have wished to revive the genre and Uc explicitly writes that vuelh far alb' ab son novelh: "I want to make an alba with a new sound."

Uc's only canso was Ses totz enjans e ses fals'entendensa.

== Sources ==
- Gaucelm, tres jocs enamoratz, with translation by James H. Donalson.
- Egan, Margarita (ed. and trans.) The Vidas of the Troubadours. New York: Garland, 1984. ISBN 0-8240-9437-9.
- Harvey, Ruth and Linda M. Paterson. The Troubadour Tensos and Partimens: A Critical Edition. D. S. Brewer, 2010.
- Markale, Jean. Courtly Love: The Path of Sexual Initiation. Inner Traditions/Bear & Company, 2000. ISBN 0-89281-771-2.
- Monson, Don A. "The Troubadour's Lady Reconsidered Again." Speculum, Vol. 70, No. 2. (Apr., 1995), pp. 255–274.
- Riquer, Martín de. Los trovadores: historia literaria y textos. 3 vol. Barcelona: Planeta, 1975.
