= Maldit-comiat =

Genre of Catalan and Occitan literature

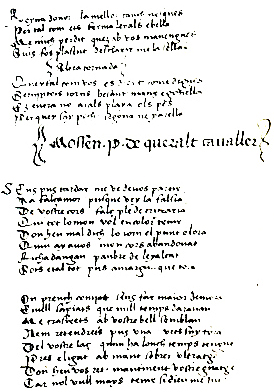
Maldit-comiat of Pere de Queralt

A maldit (Occitan: [malˈdit], also spelled maudit; Catalan: [məlˈdit, mal-], modern spelling maleit, "curse") was a genre of Catalan and Occitan literature practiced by the later troubadours. It was a song complaining about a lady's behaviour and character. A related genre, the comiat (Occitan: [kuˈmjat], Catalan: [kumiˈat, komiˈat]; "dismissal"), was a song renouncing a lover. The maldit and the comiat were often connected as a maldit-comiat (or comiat-maldit) and they could be used to attack and renounce a figure other than a lady or a lover, like a commanding officer (when combined, in a way, with the sirventes). The maldit-comiat is especially associated with the Catalan troubadours. Martí de Riquer describes un autèntic maldit-comiat as a song where a poet leaves a mistress to whom he has long been fruitlessly devoted, and explains her failings which have led him to depart.

The earliest comiat is probably a fragmentary work by Uc Catola, of the first generation of troubadours.

== Maldits in Catalonia ==
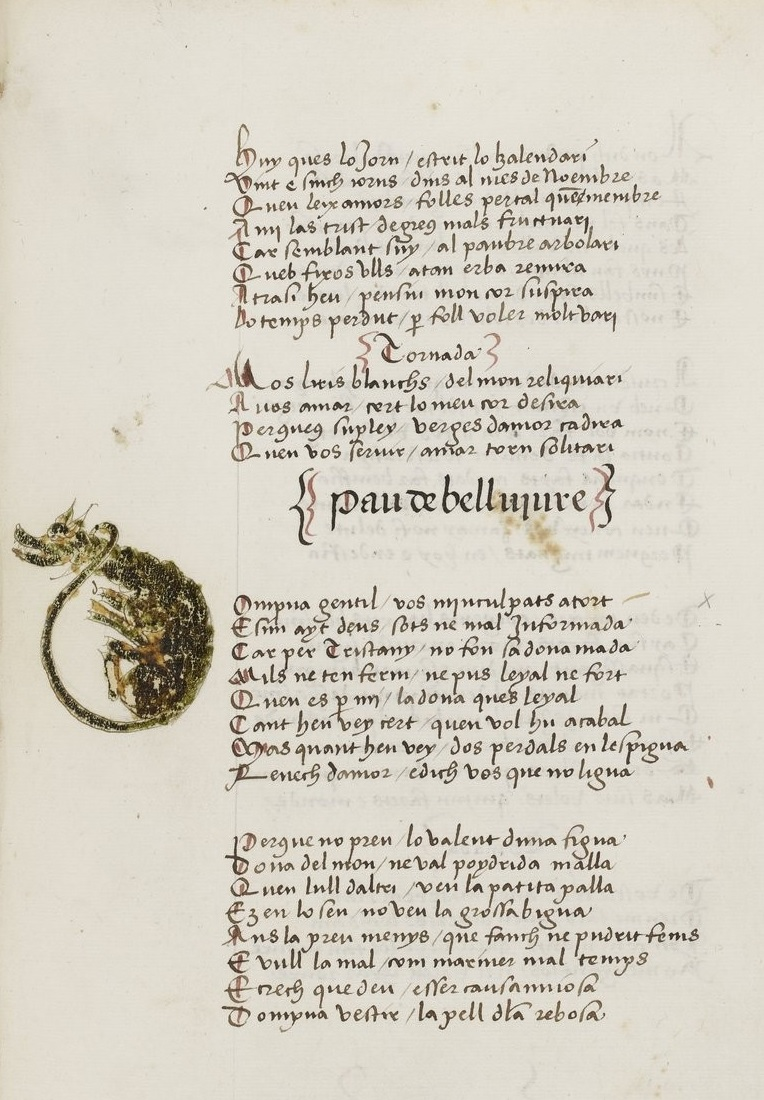
Maldit of Pau de Bellviure

The most famous maldit is probably poem XLII of Ausiàs March. It is a virulent attack on several named women. The poem is only explicitly named as a maldit in one minor manuscript, but since the term could refer, at its most general, to any poem "cursing" another, the term is accepted by modern scholars as accurate. Other Catalan authors who wrote maldits, as identified in the manuscripts or by later scholars, include Pau de Bellviure, Pere de Queralt, Simon Pastor, Jordi de Sant Jordi, Joan Basset (two), Guillem de Masdovelles (three), Johan Berenguer de Masdovelles (ten), and Pere Johan de Masdovelles (two). Francesc Ferrer in Lo conhort quotes from six other authors, works which may have been maldits. It was evidently a popular genre in the second quarter of the fifteenth century.

All of the above poets do not name their lovers and do not include a comiat in their poems. On the basis of this, March has been argued to be creating a new form, politically motivated and less encumbered by the ethics of courtly love. The composers of traditional maldits often refer to their women by senhals (code names) like Na Maliciosa (Lady Malicious) and Na Mondina (Worldly Lady). Simon Pastor, however, wrote a maldit against an unnamed man. The Leys d'amor, the guiding treatise of the Consistori de Tolosa and the Consistori de Barcelona, condemned the maldig especial (regarded as usually a type of sirventes), which attacked a specific individual (alquna certa persona: some certain person).

== Comiats in Catalonia ==
Bernart de Palaol wrote a comiat that has often been misidentified as a maldit or comiat-maldit, when in fact it contains no invective. Guillem de Masdovelles, besides his three maldits, wrote one comiat, perhaps his most famous piece. He takes leave, not of his lover, but of the military service of Guerau Alamany de Cervelló, the governor of Catalonia (governador de moltes gens e pobles, governor of many peoples and towns) at the time (1394–1405). From the same family, Johan Berenguer wrote a comiat often mischaracterised as a comiat-maldit. Another Catalan poet of the comiat was Blai Saselles.

== Seven characteristics of a maldit ==
Robert Archer suggests (p. 73) the following seven (four typical, three common) characteristics of a maldit based on his analysis of surviving examples:

1. Usually, but not always, it alludes to a past amorous relationship between poet and a woman.
2. Usually, but not always, it represents the formal end of the relationship.
3. It consists mainly of accusations of bad content, usually but not always with regards to the treatment of the poet.
4. The woman is unnamed.
5. Often, the poet claims to have had a sexual relationship with the woman.
6. Often, the poet calls the woman ugly.
7. Often, the poet is sensitive to the generally hostile reception of defamatory works of literature.

Archer does not interpret March's famous poem LXII as a maldit-comiat, though he admits it is a maldit in the general sense. One reason for this is that March was not the lover of the woman he is attacking.
