= Golden violet =

Golden violet is a common name for several violets with yellow flowers and may refer to:

- Viola aurea, native to eastern California and western Nevada
- Viola douglasii, or Douglas' golden violet
- Viola pedunculata, or California golden violet
- A prize in the Jocs Fleur of the troubadours.
