= Crescas =

Crescas (Catalan pronunciation: [ˈkɾeskəs], Hebrew: קרשקש) is a Judaeo-Catalan family name, prominent in the former Crown of Aragon. Crescas is a common name among Jews of southern France and Catalonia. There have been a number of scholars and rabbis sharing that surname, including:

- Abiathar Crescas, a 15th-century Jewish physician and astrologer, doctor to King John II of Aragon (1458–79)
- Astruc Don Crescas
- Meshullam ben Machir, Don Bonet Crescas de Lunel, French scholar who settled at Perpignan, where he died in 1306
- Hasdai Crescas (c. 1340, Barcelona – 1410/1411), a Catalan Jewish philosopher, halakhist
- Israel ben Joseph Halevi Crescas Caslari, known as "Crescas Caslari", an Aragonese-French Jewish physician and poet
- Mordecai En Crescas of Orange
- Don Crescas Vidal of Perpignan (fr)
- Vidal de Caslar Crescas

== Cresques ==
Cresques (pronounced [ˈkɾeskəs, ˈkɾeskes]) is the Catalan standardized variant of the Jewish name Crescas (Hebrew: קרשקש)

- Abraham Cresques (? – 1387), a Jewish cartographer from Palma de Mallorca
- Jehuda Cresques (also Jafudà Cresques; 1350 ? – 1427 ?)
- Cresques Abiatar, a Jewish physician in Catalan Aragon Kingdom
