= Johan Blanch =

Johan Blanch (Catalan: [ʒuˈam ˈblaŋ], Occitan: [dʒuˈam ˈblaɲtʃ]; modern Catalan spelling: Joan Blanc) was an Occitan troubadour who composed a canso for a joc floral at the Consistori del Gay Saber. According to the rubric of the fourteenth-century chansonnier that preserves it, he was a Catalan whose poem "won the violet" (gazaynet la violeta), top prize. His canso is elegant and pleading.

His dates are entirely unknown, as is the year he won the violet, though Jaume Massó i Torrents hypothesised 1360.
