= Domna, tant vos ai preiada =

1190 poetic composition by Raimbaut de Vaqueiras

Domna, tant vos ai preiada ("Lady, so much I have endeared you") is a 1190 poetic composition by Raimbaut de Vaqueiras. It is the earliest known text to have written Ligurian. In the poem, a Provençal-speaking jester (believed to be Vaqueiras) tries to attract a Genovese woman. The woman keeps rejecting him by using insults in the Genoese vernacular.

The woman compares the jester's Provençal to German, Berber, and Sardinian (No t'entend plui d'un Todesco / Sardesco o Barbarì), three languages she couldn't understand. This section in particular, has been mentioned several times in the history of Sardinian.
