= Matfre Ermengau =

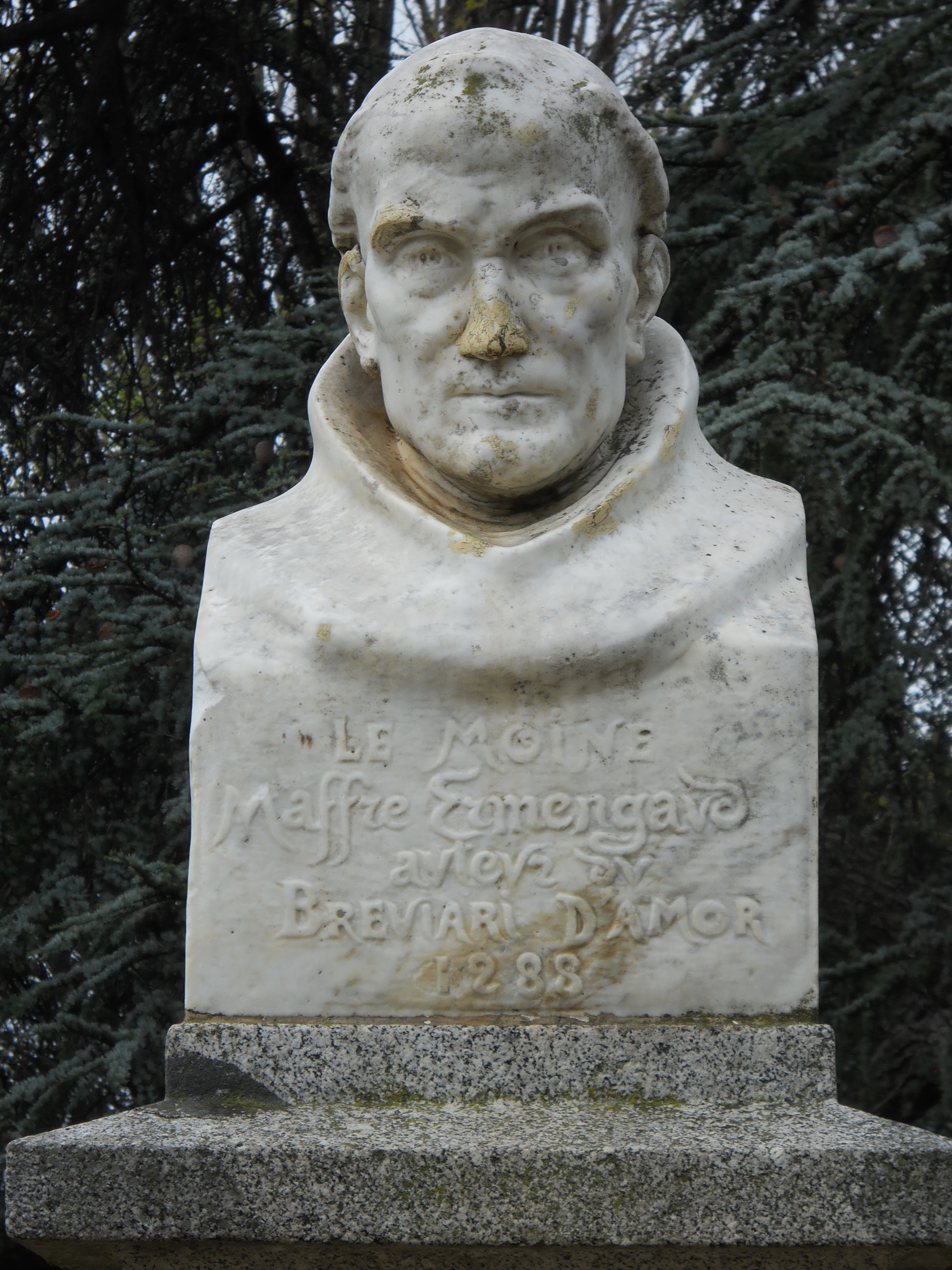
Bust of "Maffre Ermengau", work of Jean-Antoine Injalbert, Plateau des Poètes (Béziers)

Matfre Ermengau (Note: Alternative spellings of his names include "Maffre" and "Ermengaud".) (died 1322) was a Franciscan friar, legist, and troubadour from Béziers. He had a master of laws (senhor de leis) degree.

He wrote one canso, whose melody survives, and one moralising sirventes. His most famous work was an Occitan poetic book in 34,735 octosyllables called the Breviari d'amor, begun in 1288. Encyclopedic in length and diversity, its sole purpose is the reconciliation of love for God with the erotic amours of the troubadour lyric. It is divided into parts and is structured like a "tree of love". The Breviari is preserved in twelve full codices and as many fragments. It was translated into Castilian and the Limousin dialect (once thought to be Catalan or catalanisant Occitan). Matfre also says that he would have written better in Latin (from which he borrowed the word breviari, from breviarium, not found elsewhere in medieval Occitan).

The work begins with popular theology, a section entitled "The Study of God and the Creation". From the Trinity it moves to angels, demons, then the zodiac and the planets. Then in a section entitled "The Study of Nature" ("Natural Law") he discusses the proper modes of worship, then the temptations that affect Christians and the sins they must avoid. Exempla are drawn from daily life. Finally, in "The Love of God", he summarises the Christian creeds, the life of Christ, and several hagiographies.

The last section (8,000 lines) of the work, "Perilhos tractatz d'amor de donas, seguon qu'en han tractat li antic trobador en lurs cansos", structured as a dialogue between the defenders Love and her critics, is filled with citations (266 by some counts) of other troubadours and even some trouvères; Matfre cited himself six (Jeanroy) or nine (Paden) times and cited his brother Peire twice. He was careful to cite poets from different eras, but his favourites appear to be Aimeric de Peguilhan, Bernart de Ventadorn, and Peire Vidal of the "classical era". The title of "Perilhos" indicates that the antic (old) troubadours were authorities on poetic and amatory matters. He even quotes in support of this Raimon Jordan using the word antic of his predecessors. Matfre's knowledge of the early troubadours came largely through reading and he indicates that the early troubadours "sung" about love, not that they wrote about it, as did Matfre and his contemporaries. After the "Perilhos", Matfre includes a letter (epistola) to his sister, written in decasyllabic rhyming couplets: Fraires Matfre a sa cara seror. In it he explains the symbolism of a Christmas capon.

Matfre has been credited, along with Ferrari da Ferrara, for pioneering the anthologising of the troubadours. Matfre is partly responsible for the later treatment of single coblas as distinct units, because he regularly quoted one cobla from a troubadour and treated it as a single thought. Matfre had become quite famous by the time Peire de Ladils lumped him together with the heroes of Arthurian romance (c.1340).
