= Gai Saber =

Gai Saber is an Italian folk group focused on the musical and dance traditions of Italian Occitania. Gai Saber draws its name from a medieval Occitan poetic academy that traces its roots to the regions influential troubadour culture.

Founded in 1992 as Kalenda Maia, the group adopted its current name in 1996. They use a wide variety of traditional Occitanic instruments like the ghironda, lou semitoun, galoubet, lou tambourin, fifre, and piva alongside the modern guitar, keyboards, and sequencers. The song 'Quan lo rossinhols escria' is included in the '1001 Songs you must hear before you die.'

== Musicians ==
- Maurizio Giraudo
- Mauriza Giordanengo
- Paolo Brizio
- Chiara Bosonetto
- Elena Giordanengo
- Sandro Serra
- Alessandro Rapa

== Discography ==
- Troubard R'ÒC
- Esprit de Frontiera
- Danimarca Live
- Electroch'Òc
- La Fabrica Occitana
