= De vulgari eloquentia =

Latin essay by Dante Alighieri

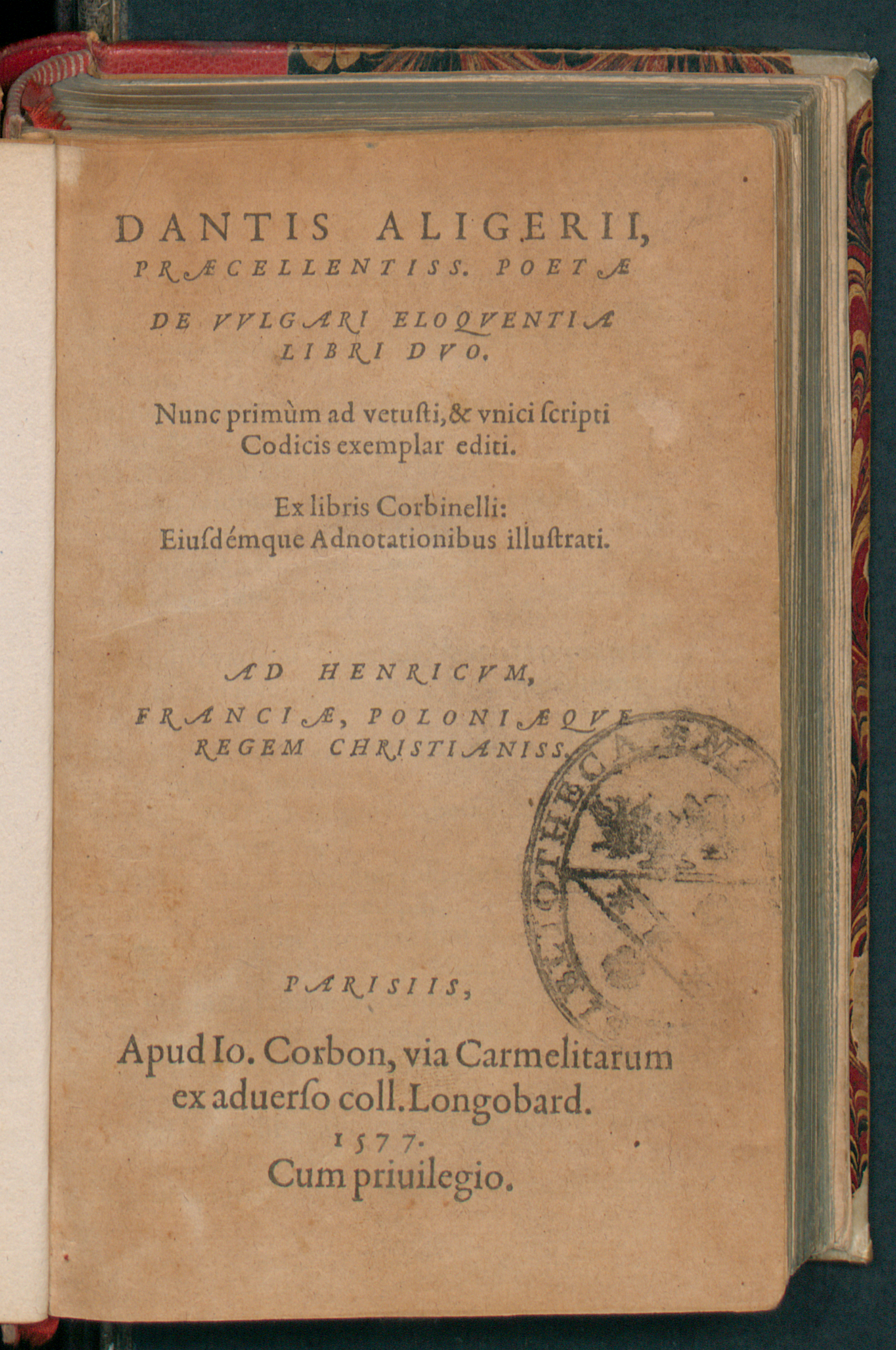
De vulgari eloquentia, 1577

De vulgari eloquentia (Ecclesiastical Latin: [de vulˈɡari eloˈkwentsi.a], Italian: [de vulˈɡaːri eloˈkwɛntsja]; "On eloquence in the vernacular") is the title of a Latin essay by Dante Alighieri. Although meant to consist of four books, it abruptly terminates in the middle of the second book. It was probably composed shortly after Dante went into exile, circa 1302–1305.

In the first book, Dante discusses the relationship between Latin and the vernacular languages, and the search for an "illustrious" vernacular in the Italian area; the second book is an analysis of the structure of the canto or song (also known as canzuni in Sicilian), which is a literary genre developed in the Sicilian School of poetry.

Latin essays were very popular in the Middle Ages, but Dante made some innovations in his work: firstly, the subject (writing in vernacular) was an uncommon topic in literary discussion at that time. Also significant was how Dante approached this theme; that is, he presented an argument for giving vernacular the same dignity and legitimacy Latin was typically given. Finally, Dante wrote this essay in order to analyse the origin and the philosophy of the vernacular, because, in his opinion, this language was not something static, but something that evolves and needed a historical contextualisation.

== Structure ==
De vulgari eloquentia is an unfinished project, and so information about its intended structure is limited. Dante interrupted his work at the fourteenth chapter of the second book, and though historians have tried to find a reason for this, it is not known why he so abruptly aborted his essay. At some point, Dante mentions a fourth book in which he planned to deal with the comic genre and the "mediocre" style, and nothing at all is known about the third book. It is thought, however, that the first book was meant to be a sort of preface to the following three books, and so shorter than the others.

== Content ==
In the beginning, Dante tackles the historical evolution of language, which he thinks was born unitary and, at a later stage, was separated into different idioms because of the presumptuousness demonstrated by humankind at the time of the building of the Tower of Babel. He compiles a map of the geographical position of the languages he knows, dividing the European territory into three parts: one to the east, with the Greek languages; one to the north, with the Germanic languages, which he believed included Magyar and Slavic languages; one to the south, separated into three Romance languages identified by their word for 'yes': oc language (from hoc), oïl language (from hoc illud) and sì language (from sic). He then discusses gramatica, "grammar", which is a static language consisting of unchanging rules, needed to make up for the natural languages. In chapters ten to fifteen of the first book, Dante writes about his search for the illustrious vernacular, among the fourteen varieties he claims to have found in the Italian region in Book 1 (X,9): "Quare ad minus XIV vulgaribus sola videtur Ytalia variari." ("Hence, Italy alone appears to display a variation of at least 14 vulgar languages.")

In the second book, Dante deals with literary genres, specifying which are the ones that suit the vernacular.

== Models ==
Dante took inspiration from rhetorical essays written in Latin, Occitan, Sicilian, and Tuscan, and from philosophical readings. The main classical rhetorical texts from which he drew information were the Ars Poetica by Horace, the Rhetorica ad Herennium by an anonymous author, and De Inventione by Cicero. About the philosophical works, it is important to know that Dante read not only first hand texts, but also summaries that sometimes were not of the original work, but of an intermediary one. The influence and importance of the contribution of the Sicilian language is emphasized by his assertion that "the first hundred and fifty years of Italian poetry was written in Sicilian".

The major Occitan work that influenced Dante was probably Razós de trobar by the Catalan troubadour Raimon Vidal de Bezaudun. The Vers e regles de trobar is an amplification of Vidal's manual, by Jofre de Foixà. Both works were Occitan manuals of grammar for troubadour poetry. They implicitly and explicitly defended Occitan as the best vernacular for song and verse, prompting Dante to come to the defence of his beloved Tuscan tongue. The popularity of both singing and composing in Occitan by Italians prompted Dante to write: A perpetuale infamia e depressione delli malvagi uomini d'Italia, che commendano lo volgare altrui, e lo loro proprio dispregiano, dico..., meaning "To the perpetual shame and lowness of the wicked men of Italy, that praise somebody else's vernacular and despise their own, I say..." (Convivio, treatise I, XI).

Dante became familiar with Saint Augustine's works, the De Consolatione Philosophiae by Boëthius, Saint Thomas Aquinas's works and some encyclopedic dictionaries like the Etymologiae by Isidore of Seville and the Livre du Tresor by Brunetto Latini. He takes also inspiration from Aristotelian philosophy, and references to texts by representatives of what is sometimes referred to as Radical Aristotelianism can be found in Dante's work.

== Sources ==
- Graham-Leigh, Elaine (2005). The Southern French Nobility and the Albigensian Crusade. Woodbridge: The Boydell Press. ISBN 978-1-84383-129-7.
- Ewert, A. (July 1940). "Dante's Theory of Language". The Modern Language Review. 35 (3): 355–366. doi:10.2307/3716632. JSTOR 3716632.
- Weiss, R. (April 1942). "Links between the 'Convivio' and the 'De Vulgari Eloquentia'". The Modern Language Review. 37 (2): 156–168. doi:10.2307/3717624. JSTOR 3717624.
- Dante Alighieri (1996) [1305]. Steven Botterill (ed.). De vulgari eloquentia. Cambridge: Cambridge University Press.
- Imbach, Ruedi; Irène Rosier-Cathach (2005). "De l'un au multiple, du multiple à l'un : une clef d'interprétation pour le De vulgari eloquentia". Mélanges de l'École française de Rome (in French). 117 (2): 509–529. doi:10.3406/mefr.2005.9376. S2CID 193663077.
