= Miquel de Castillon =

Miquel de Castillon (or Castilho) was a troubadour of Narbonne. A man of high standing in the city, he was called a probus homo (good man) in 1270 when consulted by the city consuls. He was probably the Michael de Castilione who was of the knightly class, belonging to family of vassals of the Viscounts of Narbonne. According to a hypothesis of Joseph Anglade, he may have been the same person as the Miquel de Gaucelm de Beziers who had ties to the troubadours of Béziers and was probably a royal vicar at that city or at the court of Narbonne.

Miquel, Codolet, and Guiraut Riquier composed a torneyamen (a three-way partimen). Miquel also appears as the judge of another partimen, called Falco, dona avinen, in a poetic contest. Codolet (or Codolen) is probably to be identified with the Raymundus de Codoleto who is called a civis Narbone or citizen of Narbonne. He was from Codolet, near Pont-Saint-Esprit.
