= Bernart de Panassac =

Nobleman

Bernart de Panassac (Occitan pronunciation: [beɾˈnaɾd de panaˈsak]; fl. 1323–1333) was the minor lord (donzel et seigneur) of Arrouède and one of the last troubadours. He was a founding member of the Consistori del Gay Saber in Toulouse. He composed one vers (a metaphysical song) in honour of the Virgin Mary and one canso. His work was analysed in the Gloza of Raimon de Cornet.

He died after 23 December 1335 and before 23 January 1336 at Arrouède, having just been sentenced to a heavy fine by the Parlement of Paris for having instigated a series of murders and other crimes in the counties of Armagnac and Astarac.

== Sources ==
- Jeanroy, Alfred. La poésie lyrique des troubadours. Toulouse: Privat. 1934.
- Thomas, Antoine. "Bernard de Panassac, un des fondateurs des Jeux Floraux". Annales du Midi, 27/28 (1915/16), 37–51.
