= Germà de Gontaut =

Germà de Gontaut (Catalan: [ʒəɾˈma ðə ɣunˈtawt], Occitan: [dʒeɾˈma ðe ɣunˈtawt]; fl. 1355–1386) was an Occitan poet and merchant.

Germà is mentioned as a mercadier (merchant) in the prologue to the final version of the Leys d'amor of Joan de Castellnou (1355). At that time he was one of the seven maintainers (mantenidors) of the Consistori del Gay Saber, an Occitan poetry academy in Toulouse.

On 3 May 1386 Germà de Gontaut with Ramon Galbarra judged a partimen (poetic debate) between Jacme Rovira and Bernat de Palaol for the Consistori del Gay Saber. The subject of the debate was this: there was a young lord who loved a young lady who did not return the love, yet there was another young lady, of equal worth, who loved him deeply but to whom he was unattracted; to which of these should he devote his service? Bernat defended the second lady, but the judges found in favour of Jacme and the first lady: the lord, they said, ought to devote himself to the one he truly loves, not the one who truly loves him. The judges' decision was given in verse, in a serious tone completely unbefitting the lighthearted nature of the contest.
