= Ademar de Peiteus =

Count of Valentinois and de facto ruler of Diois during 2nd century

Adémar II de Poitiers, known in Old Occitan as Ademar or Aimeric de Peiteus, (Note: In one chansonnier, he is Naimerics de peiteus, where the initial N means "Sir", in the rubric above the torneyamen in which he participated. In one poem of Raimbaut de Vaqueiras, he is N'Azemars ... de Peitieus. His French name may be given as Adhémar or Aymar.) was the count of Valentinois and de facto ruler of Diois from 1188 or 1189 until 1230. He was the son of Count Guillaume and grandson of Count Adémar I. He married Philippa, daughter of Guillaume-Jourdain, the lord of Fay, and Météline de Clérieu. The Finnish scholar Aimo Sakari hypothesised that Philippa of Fay was the famous trobairitz known as the Comtessa de Dia, and that the friend (amic) mentioned by the Comtessa in her poems was the troubadour Raimbaut de Vaqueiras. Around 1195–96, Adémar himself participated in a three-way torneyamen (a type of collaborative poem) with Raimbaut de Vaqueiras and Perdigon.

On 4 May 1187, Adémar joined his father in making a donation to the charterhouse of La Sylve-Bénite. After his father's death, Adémar received a letter from the Emperor Frederick I, written at Lyon on 21 July 1188, warning him to cease levying tolls in the Diois, which were illegal under certain privileges the emperor had extended to the bishops of Die. In March 1189, Adémar granted a charter of liberties to his vassal, Silvion, the lord of Crest, who controlled the valley between Valentinois and Diois. An inscription in marble was made of this charter and survives. In it Adémar refers to himself as "Ademar of Poitiers, count of Valentinois". Bishop Robert of Die, who had made the complaint to the emperor about Adémar's tolls, was the major witness of this charter of liberties.

In June 1189, Count Raymond V of Toulouse—in his capacity as margrave of Provence—and Adémar signed an agreement whereby the former renounced his rights in the Diois in return for the latter's fealty and homage. This is probably the occasion on which Adémar broke with the lords of Baux, and alluded to in the poem "Leus sonetz si cum suoill" by the Raimbaut de Vaqueiras. It was not, however, the occasion upon which the counts of Valentinois began calling themselves counts of Diois, a title rightly belonging to the bishops.

The counts of Valentinois had long quarrelled and vied for power with their neighbours, counts of Albon. In 1191, Countess Beatrice of Albon, who was married to Hugh III, Duke of Burgundy, signed a pact with Guillaume de Clérieu l'Abbé against Adémar. In 1192, Adémar confirmed a donation the count of Toulouse made at Léoncel, and in 1196 he granted the town a charter of liberties. In 1193, on the occasion of the consecration of the church of Montmeyran by Bishop Falco of Valence, the count of Valentinois granted it and its prior, Ponce, some of his vassals, without effecting the freedoms and exemptions they enjoyed under him. In 1197 Adémar and Philippa made a donation to the charterhouse of Bonnefoy, which her father had founded in 1156. When he made a donation to the priory of Rompont on 31 January 1202, the day of his son Guillaume's birth, he asked God to preserve his child's life so that he could work for the glory and good of the church.

Ademar sought to take more control of local lands from William of Savoy, bishop of Valence. Silvion of Crest sought the support of the bishop against Ademar, and the bishop led forces which captured many of Ademar's men. There was an initial peace treaty in 1227, with a more final treaty concluded in 1231. Ademar had at least one son, William (Guillaume), who married Flotte de Royans and had a son, Ademar III. William died in 1227, and the fate of his widow and son were a key part in the resolution of the conflict with William of Savoy. Ultimately, she remarried to Aymon II de Faucigny.
