= Jofre de Foixà =

Troubadour

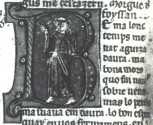
Jofre, portrayed as a monk in this miniature introducing his song Be m'a lonc temps

Jofre de Foixà (or Jaufre de Foixa) (died c. 1300) was a troubadour from Foixà in the Empordà, the second son of Bernard of Foixà.

At a young age Jofre became a Franciscan and appears in that position when mentioned for the first time at Monzón in 1267. In 1275 he put off the Franciscan habit for the black cowl of the Benedictines, almost certainly at the monastery of Sant Feliu de Guíxols. When the French under Philip III invaded Catalonia as part of the Aragonese Crusade, king Peter III nominated Jofre procurator of the monastery of Sant Pere de Galligants and trusted to him many important missions.

In 1293 he was in Sicily as abbot of San Giovanni degli Eremiti in Palermo. There he enjoyed the favour of both James II of Aragon and Frederick II. The last time Jofre is mentioned is in 1295. While in Sicily, Jofre was commissioned by James to write a tract, Vers e regles de trobar, concerning the rules of the troubadour art, mainly the grammar of Lemosi. The work, which contained many extracts from other troubadours, was intended to augment the Razos de trobar of Ramon Vidal. In his time, Vidal had written that "all people wish to listen to troubadour songs and to compose them, including Christians, Saracens, Jews, emperors, princes, kings, dukes, counts, viscounts, vavassours, clerics, townsmen, and villeins." By his time, Jofre could praise the engyn (understanding) of the laymen for the subtle vernacular grammar.

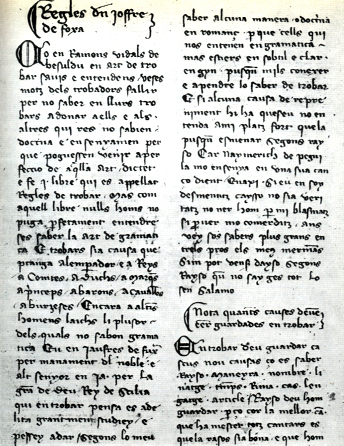
The Regles de trobar in a Catalan manuscript

Among the other surviving works of Jofre are three cansos and a cobla. In one of his cansos he devotes different stanzas to the different works of his favourite troubadours: Arnaut de Maruelh (stanzas I and II), Perdigon (III and IV), Folquet de Marseille (V), Gaucelm Faidit (VI). This innovation was taken up by Petrarch, who did the same thing to celebrate the poets of the Dolce Stil Novo.

I
Be m'a lonc temps menat a guiza d'aura
ma bon'amors, quo fainaus sobre vens;
mas lo perill m'asuava e·m daura
lo bos espersqu'ay en vos fermamens,
en cuy amar es ferms totz mos talents,
qu'aissi m'an pes de vos, qu'es blond'e saura,
les grans beutatz e·ls fis ensenhamens.

II
No m'agra ops que·m fos tan agradiva
vostr'amistatz, dona, de bos aibs flors,
pus deviatz envas mi tan autiva
de cor esse, e lunhar mi·l secors
qu'ay atendut lonjamens; quar us plor
m'en sors tan grieus que non cre guaire viva:
si·m destrenhetz, dona, vos et Amors.

III
E ja de vos no·m do so qu'ieu dezire
jamai Jhezus, si per als a murir
tem, mas pe so quar sai ses contradire
que pos mortz fos no·us poyia servir.
Pero si·l mal vos plazen ni·l martir,
ni·l grieu afan de que yeu suy suffrire,
ben aya·l mal e l'afan e·l cossir.

IV
Qu'a mi non deu plazer mas so que·us playa,
pus del tot suy vostres ab bona fe,
sol no vulhats que d'amar vos m'estranya,
quar le poders non es ges mieus de re.
Be suy conques, mas trop suy luenh de be,
qu'en tal cossir m'an empench que m'esglaya
ir'e pezars e dona ses merce.

V
E vos, Amors, pus ab tam ferm coratge
vos am e·us ser, per que·us truep tan nozen?
qu'ades m'ausizetz tolhen alegrage
et ades mi revivetz joys renden,
per qu'ieu trac piegz d'ome de tot moren.
Doncx pus avetz en mi·l plen poderatge,
Amors, merce, no mueyra tan soven!

VI
Dona, per vos m'es Amors tan sobreira;
e si m'auci, de vos mou l'ochaizos.
Don volgra be que·us auzes esquerreira
nomnar vas fe; mas en vos falhizos
non dey pensar sia, pero de vos
tenc er, que·m faitz mal, dona plazenteira,
mon cor e mi e mas bonas chansos.

VII
Vostres suy tan, don'agradiv'e pros,
qu'on piegz mi faitz, ab amor pus enteyra
humils e francs e fis sopley vas vos.

== Sources ==
- Page, Christopher."Listening to the Trouvères." Early Music, Vol. 25, No. 4, 25th Anniversary Issue; Listening Practice. (Nov., 1997), pp 638–650, 653–656, and 659. JSTOR 3128410
