= Arnaut Vidal de Castelnou d'Ari =

Arnaut Vidal de Castelnou d'Ari (Occitan pronunciation: [aɾˈnaw biˈðal ðe kasˌtelˈnɔw ˈðaɾi]; fl. 1305–1324) was a medieval Occitan author from Castelnaudary.

Arnaut was a troubadour and the first poet laureate of the Consistori del Gay Saber. Arnaut's poem in praise of the Virgin Mary was adjudged the best by the Consistori at a contest held on Holy Cross Day 1324 at Toulouse and the troubadour was awarded the violeta d'or (golden violet). He received the flor de gaug d'argen fi (fine marigold in silver) as the first prize for a dansa at the festa de Santa Crotz on 3 May 1324.

He was also the author of the chivalric romance Guilhem de la Barra (1318), of which Paul Meyer produced the editio princeps (first modern critical edition). A new (French) edition has since been produced.

== Sources ==
- Aubrey, Elizabeth. "References to Music in Old Occitan Literature." Acta Musicologica, 61:2 (May–Aug., 1989), pp. 110–149.
- Gouiran, Gérard. Arnaut Vidal de Castelnaudary: Le Livre des aventures de Monseigneur Guilhem de la Barra. Paris: Champion, 1997.
- Harris, M. Roy. "The Occitan Translations of John XII and XIII–XVII from a Fourteenth-Century Franciscan Codex (Assisi, Chiesa Nuova MS. 9)." Transactions of the American Philosophical Society, New Series, 75:4 (1985), pp. 1–149.
- Jeanroy, Alfred. La poésie lyrique des troubadours. Toulouse: Privat. 1934.
- Meyer, Paul. Guillaume de la Barre, roman d'aventures par Arnaut Vidal de Castelnaudari, publie pour la premiere fois d'apres le manuscrit unique. Paris, 1895.
