= Guiraut d'Espanha =

Guiraut d'Espanha (Old Occitan: [ɡiˈɾawd desˈpaɲa] or de Tholoza (fl. 1245–1265) was of the last generation of troubadours, working in Provence at the court of Charles of Anjou and Countess Beatrice. Many of his poems were addressed to Beatrice. Guiraut was either from Spain or Toulouse—the manuscripts differ—but ten of his dansas, a pastorela, and a baladeta survive. One of his dansas, Ben volgra s'esser poges, survives with a melody. It begins:

Ben volgra, s'esser poges c'amors si gardes d'aytan que non feses fin ayman chausir en luec que.l plages.	I really wish, if possible, that Love would take care not to make a true lover chose what pleases Love itself.

And ends:

Dansa, car ieu ay apres que.l reys Karles fay gent chan, per aquo as el ti man car de fin pres es apres	Dance, since I have learned that King Charles composes noble songs. I send you to him, for he is of true merit.

He also wrote Per amor soi gai.

== Sources ==
- Aubrey, Elizabeth. The Music of the Troubadours. Indiana University Press, 1996. ISBN 0-253-21389-4.
