= Floral Games =

Historic poetry contests

Floral Games were any of a series of historically related poetry contests with floral prizes. In Occitan, their original language, and Catalan they are known as Jocs florals (Catalan: [ˈʒɔks fluˈɾals], Valencian: [ˈdʒɔks floˈɾals]; modern Occitan: Jòcs florals [ˈdʒɔks fluˈɾals] or floraus [fluˈɾaws]). (Note: Archaic spelling Jochs florals.) In French, they became the Jeux floraux (pronounced [ʒø flɔʁo]), and in Basque Lore jokoak (pronounced [loɾe jokoak]). The original contests may have been inspired by the Roman Floralia (Ludi Floreales) held in honour of Flora.

== Toulouse ==
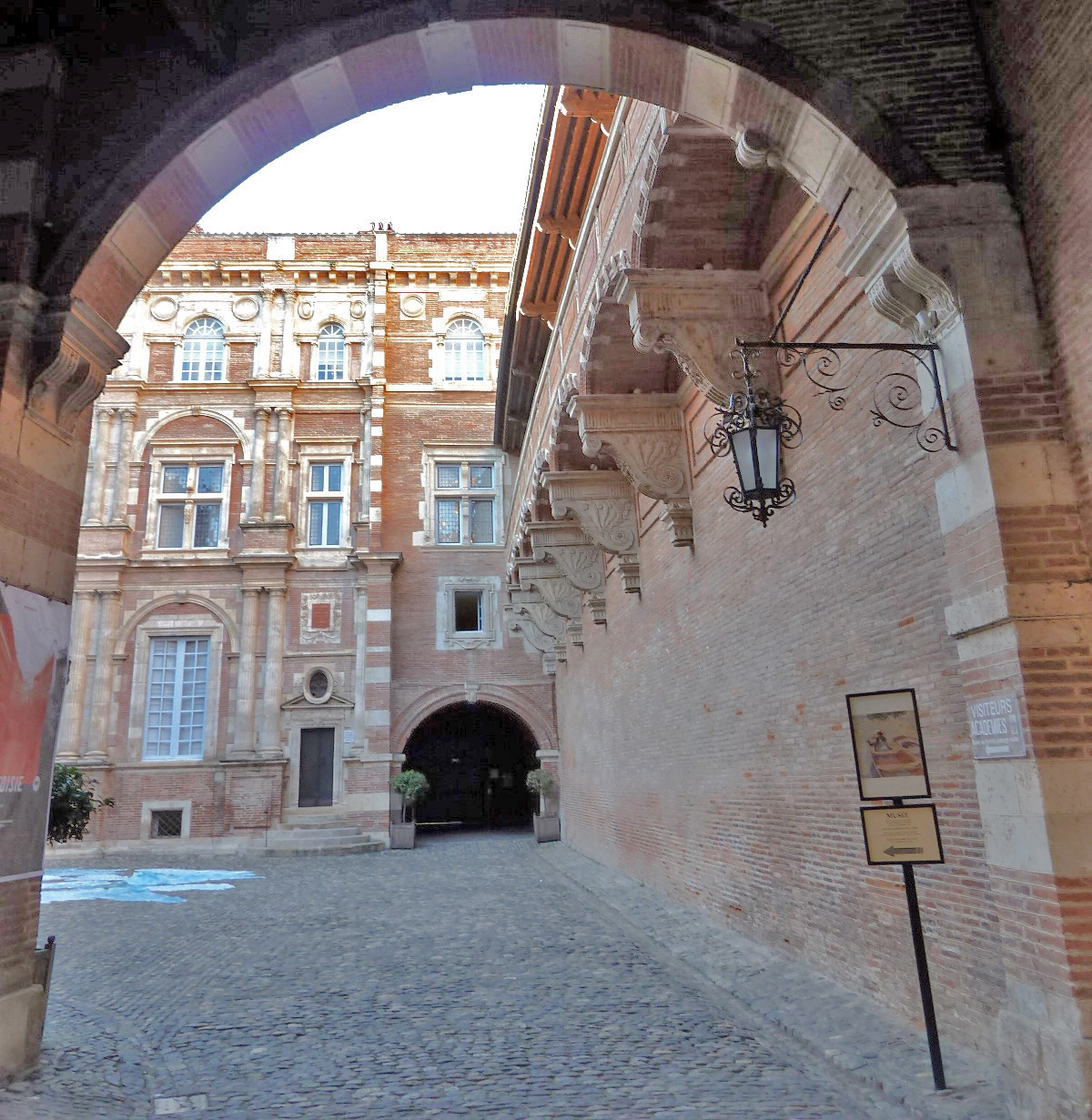
The Hôtel d'Assézat (16th century) is the seat of the Floral Games of Toulouse.

The original floral games of the troubadours were held by the Consistori del Gay Saber in Toulouse, annually from 1324, traditionally on 1 May. It is considered the oldest literary society in Europe. One contestant would receive the violeta d'aur, golden violet, for the poem judged the best. The second prize was a silver wild rose (eglantina), and the other prizes, awarded for particular poetic forms, were similarly floral. The first prize was awarded on 3 May 1324 to Arnaut Vidal de Castelnou d'Ari for a sirventes in praise of the Virgin Mary. The contests were held intermittently until 1484, when the last prize was awarded to Arnaut Bernart de Tarascon. From this period of 160 years survive the record of around a hundred prizes. These contests were judged in accordance with the Leys d'amor, a grammatical and literary treatise on Occitan poetry.

Initially the floral games were intended to keep alive the poetic language and style of the Occitan troubadours, but in time this aim was forgotten. In 1471 the golden violet was awarded to Peire de Janilhac n'ostan qu'el fos Frances, per so que dictec el lengatge de Tholosa: notwithstanding that he was French, because he composed in the language of Toulouse. In 1554 the Constistori, now the Collège, awarded a silver eglantine rose to none other than Pierre de Ronsard, the greatest French poet of his generation, for his Amours. During the Enlightenment, Fabre d'Églantine received his name from the dog rose the Collège bestowed on him. The Consistori, as the Académie des Jeux floraux, continues to function.

== Lleida ==
At Pentecost, 31 May 1338, a poetic contest was held at Lleida before Peter IV of Aragon, at which awards were given to those poems judged the best. A panel of judges was designated in advance by the king. The winning poets received a rosa d'or (golden rose) and a piece of expensive golden satin called diasprell. This contest was the first Catalan attempt to emulate the Toulouse games and it may have been part of a pattern of isolated events, though no other records have reached us.

== Barcelona ==
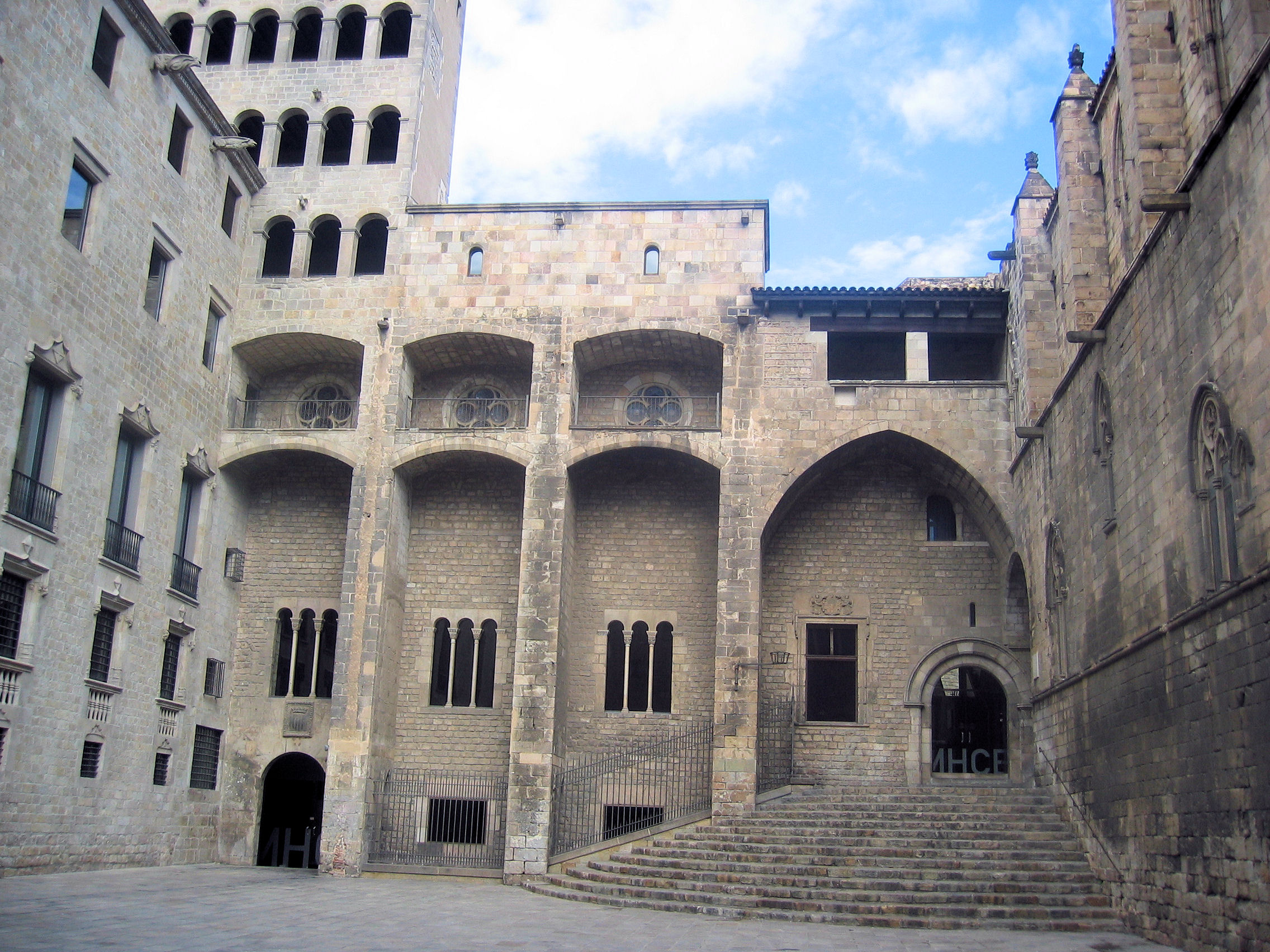
Location of the medieval Catalan games, the square in front of the Palau Reial Major (plaça del Rei), Barcelona.

=== Medieval era ===
At Valencia on 20 February 1393, John I of Aragon (Joan I el Caçador / Chuan lo Cazataire) founded an annual festival (la festa de la Gaya Ciencia or Gaia Ciència) to be celebrated in honour of the Virgin Mary on the day of Annunciation (15 May) or the following Sunday in Barcelona. The festival included a Catalan poetry contest, modelled on those held in Toulouse, Paris, and other illustrious cities, (Note: The poetic academy of Toulouse is well known, that of Paris is only mentioned here, and the other unspecified cities remain unidentified.) and the poems submitted would be judged by a panel of literati.

The first recorded contest held by John's Consistori de Barcelona is believed to have taken place on 28 March 1395, with the king in attendance. This festival is called a bella festa ... an honor de la dita gaya ciencia, the prizes for which were provided by the municipal government of Barcelona. There is no record of the names of the winners, the prizes, or their poems. With the death of John two months later and his conflict with the city, the floral games and their source of prize money came to an end.

On 1 May 1398, John's successor, Martin the Humane (Martí l'Humà, Martín I d'Aragón), agreed to subsidise the annual festival and cover the cost of the gold and silver prizes for the winners, to be chosen by mantenidors (maintainers) named by the king. Under Martin a great festa was held in 1408 beneath the walls where the Mirador del rei Martí—a recent addition the royal palace complex—and the Palau del Lloctinent meet in Barcelona. On 17 March 1413 Ferdinand of Antequera, who had succeeded Martin, confirmed that the floral games occurred on 1 May.

=== Modern era ===
At the height of romanticism in 1859, during the Catalan Renaixença, Antoni de Bofarull and Víctor Balaguer re-established the floral games (jocs florals or Jocs de la Gaia Ciència) in Barcelona on the first Sunday in May with the theme of Patria, Fides, Amor (Country, Faith, Love), alluding to the three typical prizes: the Englantina d'or (golden eglantine) given for the greatest patriotic poem, the Flor Natural (natural flower, the prize of honour, an actual rose) for the greatest love poem, and the Viola d'or i argent (gold and silver violet) to the greatest religious poem. There were other lesser prizes. A person winning all three great prizes was given the honorific title of Mestre en Gai Saber ("Master of the Gay Science").

The intellectual and political classes swiftly patronised the Jocs Florals and their support lent renewed prestige to Catalan poetry. Several different positions soon became apparent with respect to the models to be used for the creation of a Catalan literature. Marià Aguiló defended as worthy models all the various forms and authors. Antoni de Bofarull defended sixteenth- and seventeenth-century Catalan authors and the Barcelonese dialect as the best models for Catalan poetry. Finally, there was a "third way" that upheld a unique nineteenth-century Catalan poetry in Barcelonese dialect, but it had few defenders among the supporters of the Jocs Florals. In the end, the Jocs attracted persons of a wide variety of ideologies: republicans, conservatives, the young people. Eventually, Frederic Soler and his followers would participate in the majority of contests. The Jocs Florals went a long way to re-asserting the Catalan language after centuries of decline with respect to Castilian.

==== Mestres en Gai Saber ====
- 1861 – Víctor Balaguer
- 1862 – Jeroni Rosselló Ribera
- 1863 – Joaquim Rubió i Ors
- 1866 – Marian Aguiló i Fuster
- 1867 – Josep Lluís Pons i Gallarza
- 1868 – Adolf Blanch i Cortada
- 1869 – Francesc-Pelai Briz i Fernàndez
- 1871 – Jaume Collell i Bancells
- 1873 – Tomàs Forteza i Cortès
- 1874 – Francesc d'Assís Ubach i Vinyeta
- 1875 – Frederic Soler
- 1877 – Àngel Guimerà
- 1878 – Damas Calvet de Budallés
- 1880 – Jacint Verdaguer i Santaló
- 1883 – Josep Franquesa i Gomis
- 1885 – Ramon Picó i Campamar
- 1887 – Terenci Thos i Codina
- 1890 – Joaquim Riera i Bertran
- 1892 – Josep Marti i Folguera
- 1896 – Anicet de Pagès i de Puig
- 1897 – Frederic Rahola
- 1898 – Francesc Badenes Dalmau
- 1900 – Guillem August Tell i Lafont
- 1902 – Miquel Costa i Llobera
- 1903 – Joan Maragall i Gorina
- 1908 – Apel·les Mestres
- 1909 – Joan Alcover i Maspons
- 1910 – Llorenç Riber i Campins
- 1914 – Manuel Folch i Torres
- 1926 – Ramon Garriga i Boixader
- 1931 – Josep Maria de Sagarra
- 1936 – Felip Graugés i Camprodon
- 1941 – Domènec Perramon
- 1949 – Mercè Rodoreda i Gurguí
- 1953 – Agustí Bartra
- 1958 – Joaquim Boixés
- 1959 – Albert Manent
- 1961 – Ventura Gassol
- 1961 – Narcís Lunes i Boloix
- 1963 – Carles Pi i Sunyer
- 1967 – Manuel de Pedrolo
- 1971 – Ambrosi Carrion
- 1971 – Albert Junyent
- 1973 – Ramon Muntanyola i Llorach
- 1978 – Olga Xirinacs Díaz

== Valencia ==
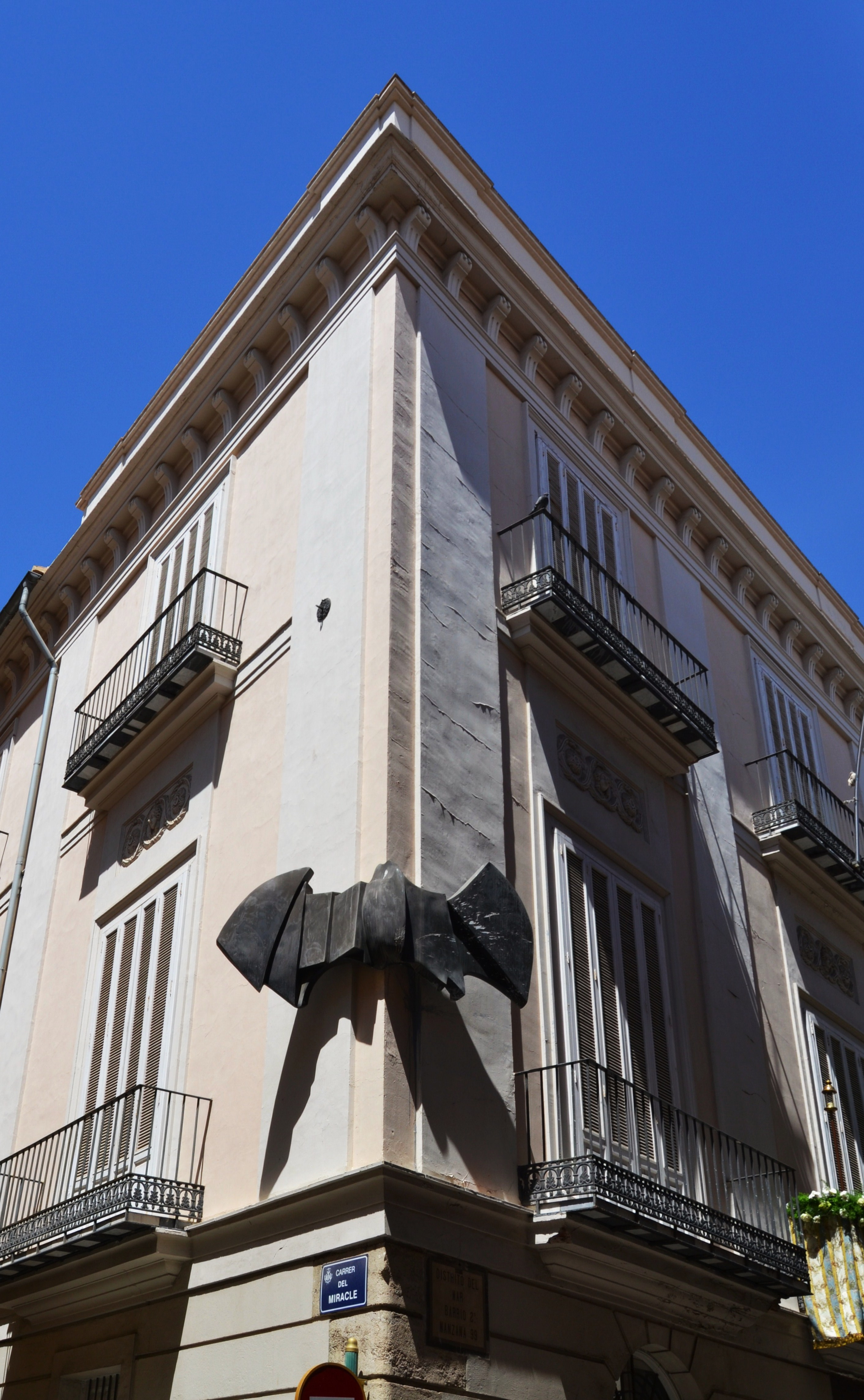
The seat of Lo Rat Penat, which organises the Valencian games annually

In 1879 Jocs Florals were established at Valencia two decades after the ones in Barcelona. The games were traditionally held by Lo Rat Penat in the Valencian language. A total of seventeen prizes were awarded annually; the three top prizes were identical to those of the Barcelonan games. On top of the usual contests that included theatre and narrative as well as poetry, there were extraordinary contests held by institutions all throughout the Land of Valencia.

The Jocs of Valencia witnessed thirty-five Mestres en Gai Saber and two female winners of the Flor Natural (top prize, an actual rose). Figures like Blasco Ibañez and Niceto Alcalá-Zamora have acted as maintainers, i.e. presidents and judges of the Jocs, and in 1914 and 1999 the maintainers were women. The Regina (queen) who sits in the Cadira d'Or (golden chair) is elected alternatingly from the three Valencian provinces (Alicante, Castellón, and Valencia) and from the comarques. Today the Jocs take place in the Teatro Principal with the attendance of the highest dignitaries of the Valencian Community.

== Basque Country ==
In the Basque Country, the renaissance of the floral games (Lore Jokoak) was fostered by Antoine D'Abbadie (Anton Abbadia), an outstanding Basque French scholar and man of science settling down in Hendaia. The festival aimed at providing a gathering point for Basque celebration, improving the social status of Basque culture, and encouraging literary production at either side of the French-Spanish border (especially Labourd, Navarre, Gipuzkoa). It was first celebrated in Urruña (1851).

Proper floral games lasted up until Antoine D'Abbadie's death in 1897, but their legacy was taken over by like initiatives, such as the Basque Festival in Donostia (presently held in early September). The coat of arms of the Zazpiak Bat ("Seven provinces make one (territory)") was first coined in the context of the Lore Jokoak.

== Esperanto ==
The Barcelonan games inspired an imitation, the Internaciaj Floraj Ludoj (Juegos Florales Internacionales or Jocs Florals Internacionals), in Esperanto in 1909. The games were the most prestigious Esperanto event in the era before the Second World War.

== Chile ==
A national literary contest called the Juegos Florales was held in Santiago, Chile in 1914. On 22 December Gabriela Mistral, who took her pen name from Occitan poet Frédéric Mistral, won top prize for her Sonetos de la Muerte. After winning the Juegos, she infrequently used her given name of Lucila Godoy for her publications.

== See also ==
- Acadèmia dels Jòcs Florals

== Sources ==
- Boase, Roger (1977). The Origin and Meaning of Courtly Love: A Critical Study of European Scholarship. Manchester: Manchester University Press. ISBN 0-87471-950-X.
- Paden, William D. (November 1995). "The Troubadours and the Albigensian Crusade: A Long View". Romance Philology. 49 (2): 168–191.
- Prado, Joan Manuel (1989). Història de la Literatura Catalana. Fascicles de l'Avui (in Catalan). Vol. I. Barcelona: Edicions 62. ISBN 84-8332-596-9.
- Riquer, Martí de (1964). Història de la Literatura Catalana (in Catalan). Vol. 1. Barcelona: Edicions Ariel.
- "Jocs florals". Enciclopèdia Catalana (in Catalan). Archived from the original on 18 July 2010.
