= Guillem de l'Olivier =

Guillem de l'Olivier d'Arle, also spelled Guilhem del Olivier, was a troubadour, probably active after 1260. He was from Provence, presumably the region around Arles, and he was also active in northern Italy. He was a prolific author of coblas esparsas, single-stanza poems, usually on a moral theme. The number of lines per poem vary from a low of four to a high of sixteen. Scholars Alfred Pillet and Henry Carstens, along with István Frank, counted 77 such pieces; while Oskar Schultz-Gora counted 79, and Alfred Jeanroy only 70.

A poem ascribed to a "Sir [En] G. de Lobeuier" in one chansonnier is commonly thought to belong to Guillem de l'Olivier, and some manuscripts also mistakenly call him "Gui" or "Guiraut". The unreliable Jean de Nostredame identified him with a certain Uc de Lobevier (Hugues de Lobières).

== Coblas esparsas ==
1. Tan no puesc legir ni pessar
2. Fals' amor no si pot dir
3. Tota dona c'amors vensa
4. Donas, per cosselh vos dic
5. Donas, crezetz mon prezic
6. Mans se fenhon enamorat
7. So nos retrais Marcabrus
8. Homs que se rent de sa molher gilos
9. Pros dona enamorada
10. Alcus homes sai entre nos
11. Qui ama cortezia
12. D'omes vey c'an a totz jorns mens
13. Qui s'azauta d'enuetz faire
14. Qui sap gardar fach e dich de secret
15. Jocx e putanaria
16. Qui vol aver ganre d'amicx
17. Seneca que fon fom sabens
18. Tant es lo mons costumatz
19. Ben corteza conoissensa
20. Qui se volgues cosselhar
21. Tot hom me par be noiritz
22. Catre cauzas son fort nominativas
23. Ricx hom qu'enten en gran nobleza
24. Escrich truep en un nostr' actor
25. Ieu non tenc home per amic
26. Si vols far ver' esproansa
27. S'us homs sabia mal ses be
28. Motas veguadas s'endeve
29. Catre maneiras son de gens
30. Senca dis que saup philozophia
31. Entr' amicx et enemicx
32. Auzit ay dir manta[s] sazo[s]
33. Bon es saver acampar
34. Riqueza grans fan far manta falhensa
35. Sert es qui a mal vezi
36. Bona fin fai qui ab bon albres lia
37. Cobes e larcx aug cais tot jorn repenre
38. Ieu ai vist home plaguat
39. Si fos tan bos segles com sol
40. Escrig (o) truep en Salomo
41. D'omes truep que donan cosselh
42. Tres enemicx principals
43. Aisi com per aventura
44. Mal temps fai reconoysser dieu
45. Ieu coseguiey temps e sazo
46. Mals tratz don(a) alegransa
47. Tal home am que sos aibs nom azaula
48. Homs ben parlans deu mais entendre
49. De razon es e de natura
50. Aitan ben tanh per dever
51. Trop parlars fay desmentir
52. Hom que per pauc de profiech
53. Totz homs deu esser curos
54. Ieu me tenc a gran plazer
55. Trop voluntatz tol la vista
56. Pieitz fa un petit de mal
57. Us homs es c'a ajustat
58. Si per chantan esjauzir
59. Bona fes e mala
60. Alcun son trop de fama
61. Gauch e solatz e cortezia
62. Dieus donet comandamen
63. Totz hom se deu donar suenh
64. Per respiech d'alcun befach
65. Bos noirimens dona regla
66. Sieu auzes dire a ma guiza
67. Sens e sabers e conoissenza
68. Hon mais m'esfors cascun jorn d'aver vida
69. Fals semblans e mot deslials
70. Tart o tost son doas cauzas per natura
71. En totz afars tanh cortezia
72. Hom deu lauzar son amic
73. Hoc e no son dui contrari
74. Tot enaisi com peira preziosa
75. Qui en anel d'aur fai veir' encastonar

== Editions ==
- Larghi, Gerardo, ed. Paraulas de vertat e de profiech: Edizione del canzoniere di Guilhem de l’Olivier d'Arles. Brepols, 2021.
- Schultz-Gora, Oskar, ed. "Die 'coblas triadas' des Guilhem de l'Olivier d'Arle". Provenzalische Studien, I. Schriften der Wissenschaftlichen Gesellschaft in Straßburg, 37. Strasbourg: Karl J. Trübner, 1919 : 24–82.
