= Bernat de Palaol =

Bernat de Palaol or de Mallorques (Catalan pronunciation: [bəɾˈnad də pələˈɔl]; fl. 1386) was a Catalan troubadour and merchant from Mallorca. He was sometimes called lo mercader mallorquí ('the Mallorcan merchant').

On 3 May 1386 Bernat participated publicly in a partimen (poetical debate) with Jacme Rovira before the judges Germà de Gontaut and Ramon Galbarra at the Consistori del Gay Saber in Toulouse. The subject of the debate was this: there was a young lord who loved a young lady who did not return the love, yet there was another young lady, of equal worth, who loved him deeply but to whom he was unattracted; to which of these should he devote his service? Bernat defended the second lady, but the judges found in favour of Jacme and the first lady: the lord, they said, ought to devote himself to the one he truly loves, not the one who truly loves him.

Bernat produced only one surviving work, a combination of maldit and comiat that began Cercatz d'uymay, ja.n siatz belha y pros. In the tradition of those genres, Bernat describes his lady as unjust and indiscrete and renounces her. The terms he uses make it clear that he has not praised this woman in any previous poem. This poem, despite its generic rhyme scheme and metre, was moderately popular: it was cited by Francesc Ferrer and Francesc de la Via in the next century and its melody was adopted for a certain song of the Misteri d'Elx.
