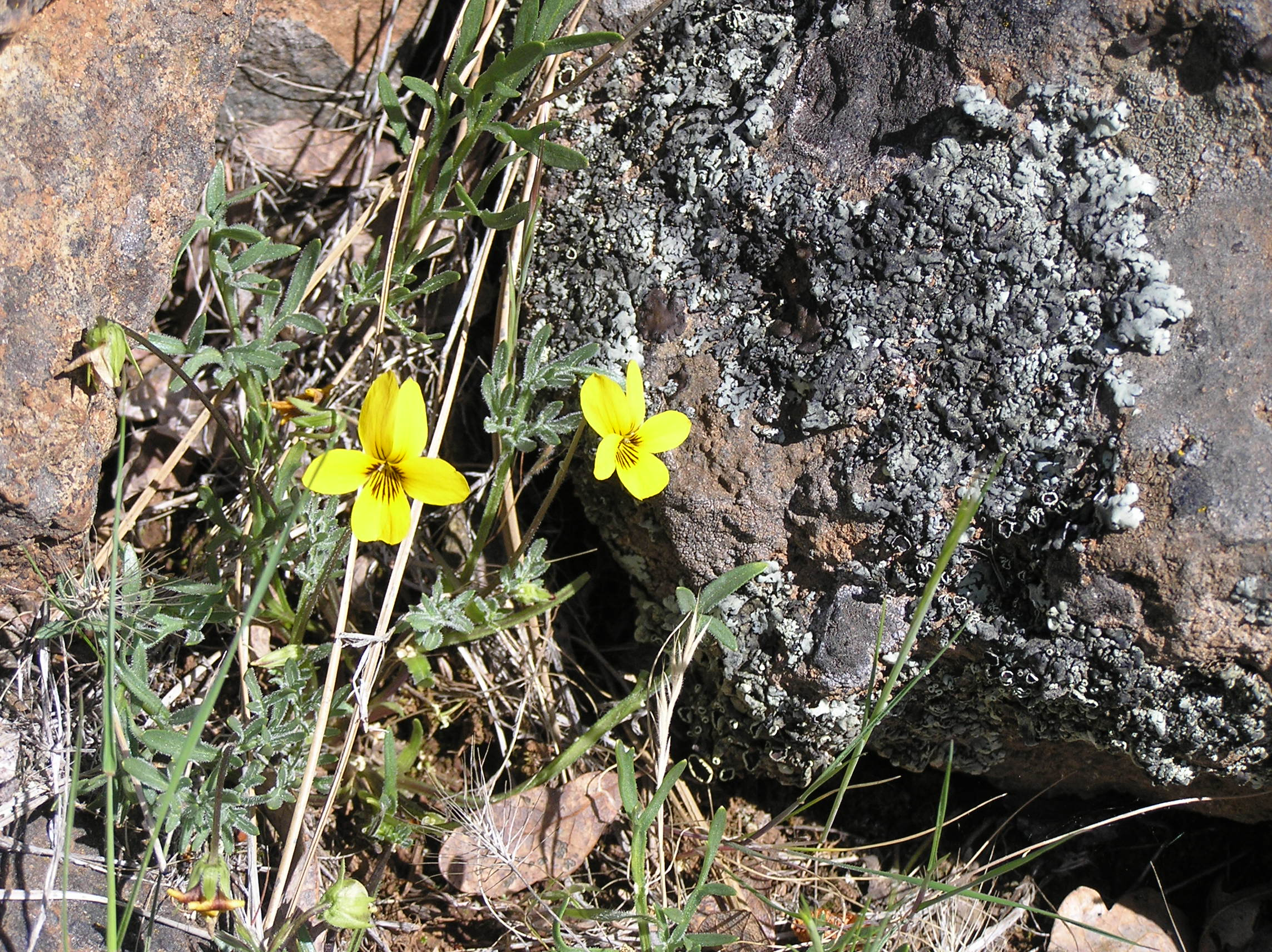

Conservation status
- Apparently Secure (NatureServe)

Scientific classification
- Kingdom: Plantae
- Clade: Tracheophytes
- Clade: Angiosperms
- Clade: Eudicots
- Clade: Rosids
- Order: Malpighiales
- Family: Violaceae
- Genus: Viola
- Species: V. douglasii

Binomial name
- Viola douglasii Steud.

Synonyms
- Viola chrysantha Hook.; Viola chrysantha var. nevadensis Kellogg

= Viola douglasii =

Species of flowering plant

Viola douglasii is a species of violet known by the common name of Douglas' violet, or Douglas' golden violet. It is native to western North America from Oregon through California and into Baja California, where it grows in seasonally moist habitat, often on serpentine soils. This rhizomatous herb produces a cluster of erect stems just a few centimeters in length to about 20 centimeters in maximum height. The leaf blades are deeply dissected into several narrow lobes or compound, made up of leaflets, and borne on long petioles. They are hairless to softly hairy in texture. A solitary flower is borne on a long, upright stem. It has five bright or deep yellow petals with brown veining and brown outer surfaces. The largest lowest petal may be over 2 centimeters in length.
