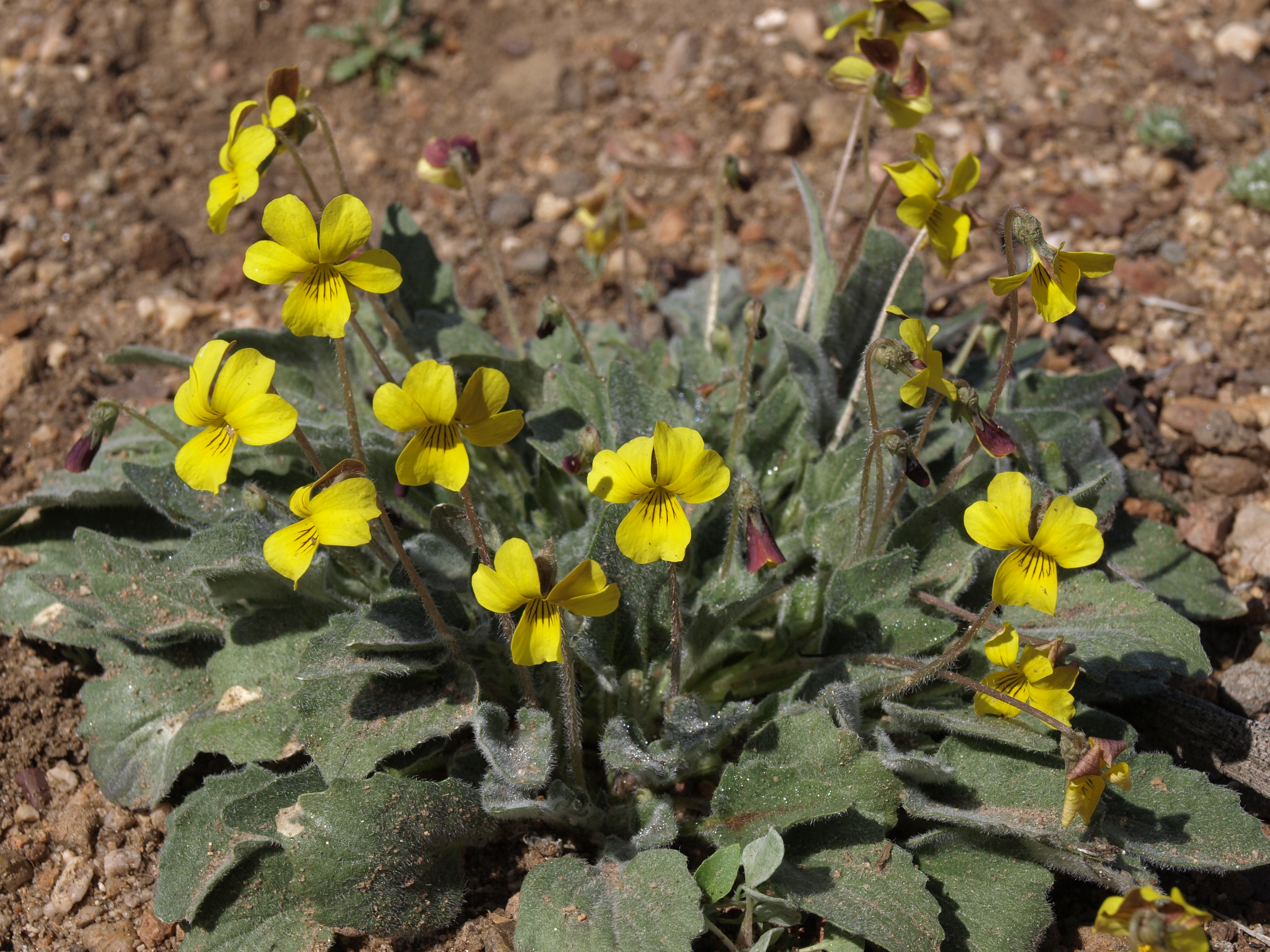

Conservation status
- Imperiled (NatureServe)

Scientific classification
- Kingdom: Plantae
- Clade: Tracheophytes
- Clade: Angiosperms
- Clade: Eudicots
- Clade: Rosids
- Order: Malpighiales
- Family: Violaceae
- Genus: Viola
- Species: V. (p.) purpurea
- Variety: V. (p.) p. v. aurea

Trinomial name
- Viola (plant) purpurea var. aurea (Kellogg) M.S.Baker ex Jeps.

Synonyms
- Viola aurea Kellogg; Viola purpurea subsp. aurea (Kellogg) J.C.Clausen

= Viola purpurea var. aurea =

Variety of flowering plant

Viola purpurea var. aurea, also known as golden violet and bright yellow violet, is a variety of violet. It is endemic to the western United States (eastern California and western Nevada), where it is known from scattered occurrences in various types of dry habitat such as the slopes of desert mountains.

== Description ==
This herb grows from a tough taproot and produces a woolly-haired stem up to about 13 centimeters tall. The leaves have toothed or wrinkled, rounded or oval blades borne on petioles. They are coated in thick, white hairs. A solitary flower is borne on an upright stem. It has five yellow petals, the lowest one marked with brown veining and the upper pair tinged with brown or purple on the outer surface.
