= Consistori del Gay Saber =

Poetic academy

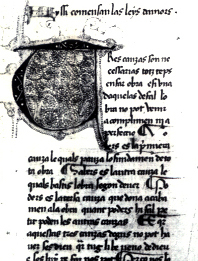
An initial from the first page of the Leys d'amor

The Consistori del Gay Saber (Occitan: [kunsisˈtɔɾi ðel ˈɣaj saˈβe]; "Consistory of the Gay Science") (Note: The consistory goes by many names in different languages. Consistori de la Gaya Sciensa is an alternate Occitan name; gai an alternate spelling; and consistòri is consistent with modern orthography.) was a poetic academy founded at Toulouse in 1323 to revive and perpetuate the lyric poetry of the troubadours.

Also known as the Acadèmia dels Jòcs Florals or Académie des Jeux Floraux ("Academy of the Floral Games"), it is the most ancient literary institution of the Western world. It was founded in 1323 in Toulouse and later restored by Clémence Isaure as the Consistori del Gay Saber with the goal of encouraging Occitan poetry. The best verses were given prizes at the floral games in the form of different flowers, made of gold or silver, such as violets, rose hips, marigolds, amaranths or lilies. The Consistori eventually became gallicised. It was renewed by Louis XIV in 1694 and still exists today. The Académie des Jeux Floraux has had such prestigious members as Ronsard, Marmontel, Chateaubriand, Voltaire, Alfred de Vigny, Victor Hugo and Frédéric Mistral.

== Foundation ==
The Consistori was founded by seven literary men of the bourgeoisie, who composed a manifesto, in Old Occitan verse, pledging to award prizes to poetry in the troubadouresque style and emulating the language of classical period of the troubadours (roughly 1160–1220). The academy was originally called the Consistori dels Sept Trobadors ("Consistory of the Seven Troubadours") or Sobregaya Companhia dels Set (VII) Trobadors de Tolosa ("Overjoyed Company of the seven troubadours of Toulouse"). In its efforts to promote an extinct literary koiné over the evolving dialects of the fourteenth century, the Consistori went a long way to preserving the troubadours' memory for posterity as well as bequeathing to later scholarship an encyclopaedic terminology for the analysis and historiography of Occitan lyric poetry. Chaytor believed that the Consistori "arose out of informal meetings of poets held in earlier years". (Note: Chaytor 1933, p. 198)

The Consistori was governed by a chancellor and seven judges or mantenedors (maintainers). (Note: Fraser 1993, p. 52, who seems also to distinguish between the Sobregaya Companhia of seven troubadours and an apparently pre-existing Consistori del Gay Saber. Chaytor 1933, p. 198, does likewise, making the Consistori the committee which appointed the chancellor and maintainers.) In 1390 John I of Aragon, one of the earliest Renaissance humanists to sit on a European throne, established the Consistori de Barcelona in imitation of the Toulousain academy. (Note: Riquer 1964, p. 565)

== Activities ==
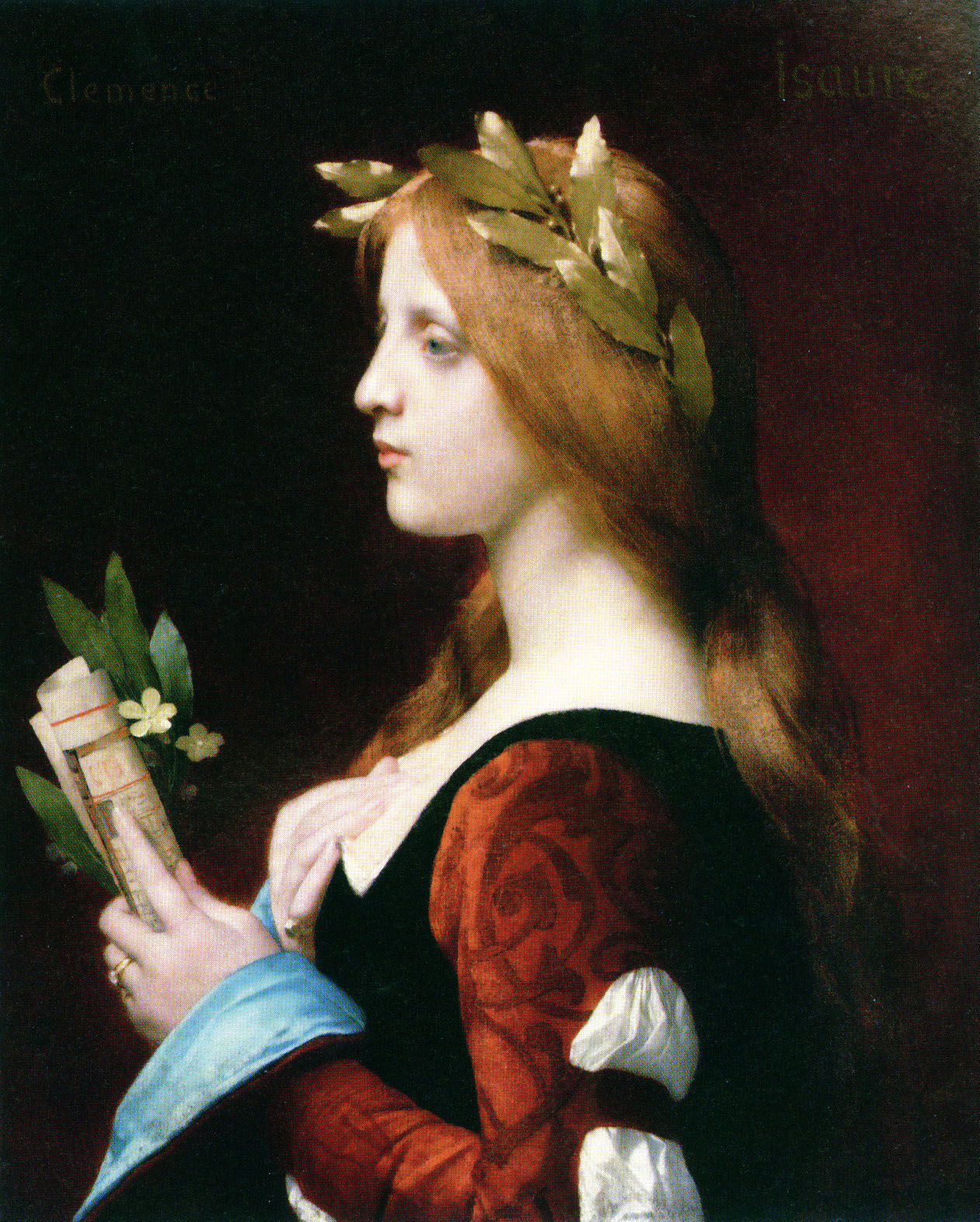
Clémence Isaure (Clemença Issaura), imaginary patroness of the Jocs Florals, by Jules Joseph Lefebvre

The Consistori held an annual poetry contest at which one contestant, the "most excellent poet" (plus excellen Dictador), would receive the violeta d'aur (golden violet) for the poem or cançó judged the best. (Note: E per tal que miels s'alezer / Cascús en far obra plazen, / Dizem que, per dreyt jutjamen, / A cel que la farà plus neta / Donarem una violeta / De fin aur, en senhal d'onor, / No regardan pretz ni valor, / Estamen ni condició / De senhor ni de companhó, / Mas sol maniera de trobar, in Las leys d'amors.) The other prizes, awarded for particular poetic forms, were similarly floral, leading later scholars to label the competitions the Jocs Florals. The best dança earned its creator a flor de gaug d'argen fi (a fine silver marigold), (Note: E per mays creysher lo deport / D'aquesta festa, dam per dansa / Am gay so, per dar alegransa, / Una flor de gaug d'argen fi, in Las leys d'amors.) and the best sirventés, pastorèla or vergièra garnered a flor d'ayglentina d'argen (a silver dog rose). (Note: E per sirventés atressí, / E pastorelas e vergieras, / Et autras d'aquestas manieras, / A cel que la farà plus fina / Donam d'argen flor d'ayglentina, in Las leys d'amors.)

The first prize was awarded on 3 May 1324 to Arnaut Vidal de Castelnou d'Ari for a sirventes in praise of the Virgin Mary. The contests were held intermittently until 1484, when the last prize was awarded to Arnaut Bernart de Tarascon. From this period of 160 years survive the record of around a hundred prizes. (Note: For a full list of laureates (1324–1694) with the flowers awarded and winning works, see Gélis 1912, p. 285.) During that century and a half, the Consistori saw participants from both south of the Pyrenees and north of Occitania, both men and women. In an unknown year, possibly 1385, an anonymous Catalan woman submitted a planh to the seven maintainers for judgement. The planh (lament) is that of a faithful woman for her lover, who has been absent several years. (Note: Riquer 1964, p. 528)

It was in order to judge these contests that the Consistori first commissioned an Occitan grammar, including the laws of poetry, be written up. The first compiler was Guilhem Molinier, whose Leys d'amor was completed between 1328 and 1337. It went through two subsequent redactions. Several other grammatical treatises and glosses were produced by poets associated with the Consistori.

By 1471 the Consistori was losing its Occitan character. It awarded the golden violet to Peire de Janilhac n'ostan qu'el fos Francés, per so que dictec e·l lengatge de Tholosa: notwithstanding that he was French, because he composed in the language of Toulouse. (Note: Paden 1995, p. 183) In 1513 the Consistori was transformed into the Collège de rhétorique et de poésie françaises: the College of French Rhetoric and Poetry. In 1554 the College awarded a silver eglantine rose to none other than Pierre de Ronsard, the greatest French poet of his generation, for his Amours. During the Enlightenment, Fabre d'Églantine received his name from the dog rose the academy bestowed on him at the jeux floraux (floral games). In 1694 the Consistori was reborn as the Académie des Jeux Floraux, founded by Louis XIV. Later, Victor Hugo received a prize at the jeux. It still exists today.

== Character and legacy ==
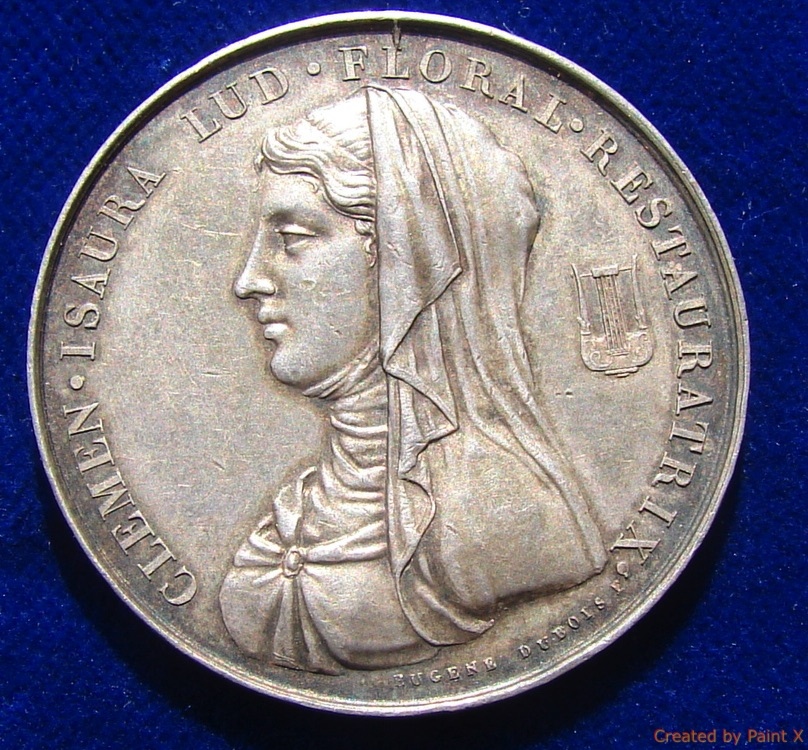
Toulouse France Silver Medal, 1819. Clémence Isaure, 1450–1500 (obverse).

The Consistori, in its nostalgic attempt to preserve what had gone out of style, is often credited with fostering a monotonous form of poetry devoid of vibrance and feeling. (Note: Riquer makes this criticism, p. 523.) Courtly love, with some adulterous and extramarital connotations, was a rarer theme with troubadours associated with Toulouse than religious themes, especially Marian. Even on religious themes, however, their work lacks the "force" of the last troubadours of the thirteenth century, like Cerverí de Girona, who wrote much on such themes. (Note: Cerverí has un to i una força (a tone and force) that the Toulousains lack (Riquer, 523).) The Toulousains lacked originality and for that reason their accomplishments have been undervalued by later generations. Their isolation and their classicism cut them off from the literary movements giving life to other vernaculars, such as the dolce stil novo and the Renaissance in Italian and the work of Ausiàs March in Catalan.

Martí de Riquer is highly critical of the escòla poetica de Tolosa, which he charges with a thematically severely limited, weighed down by a narrow conception of art and imposing strictures governing poetic form and content, negatively influencing Catalan poetry by exporting occitanisms (until Italian trends wafted over the western Mediterranean sea routes to rejuvenate it), and sustaining an outmoded literary language. He compares it to French neoclassicism and its "tyranny of the monotonous alexandrine". (Note: "tiranitzar pels monòtons alexandrins" (Riquer, 532).)

It is the inspiration for Friedrich Nietzsche's The Gay Science, 1882. It is the namesake of the Italian folk group Gai Saber.

== Associated troubadours ==
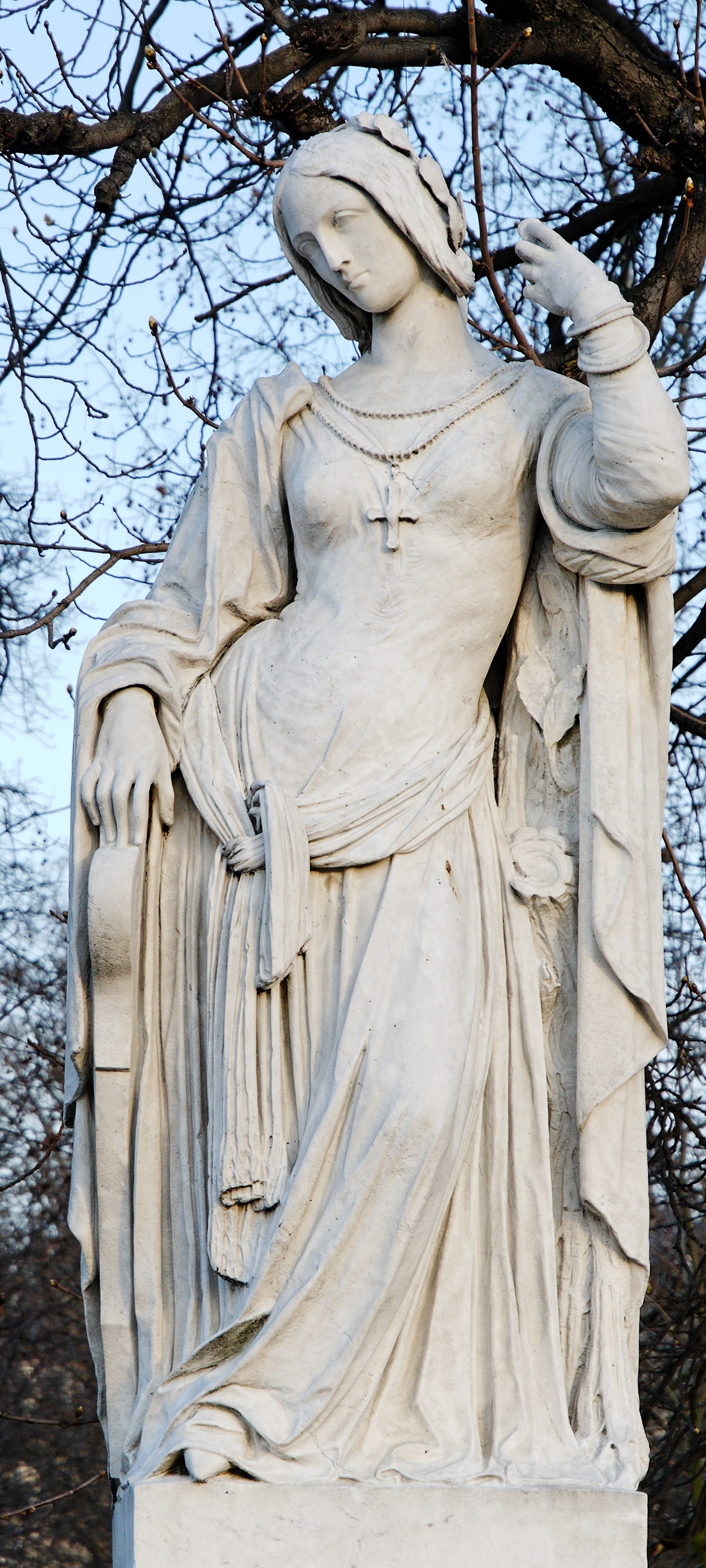
Statue of Clémence Isaure by Antoine-Augustin Préault in the Reines de France et Femmes illustres series in the Jardin du Luxembourg.

- Arnaut Bernart de Tarascon, won the violet in 1484
- Arnaut Vidal de Castelnou d'Ari, won the violet in 1324
- Bernart de Panassac, founding member
- Bernat de Palaol, lost a debate with Rovira in 1386
- Bertran del Falgar, "crowned" winner in unknown year
- Bertran de Payna, "crowned" winner in unknown year
- Bertran de Sant Roscha, "crowned" winner thrice
- Gaston III of Foix, won the "joia" unknown year
- Germà de Gontaut, maintainer in 1355 and 1386
- Guilhem Molinier, first chancellor, wrote up the rules (Leys)
- Guillem Bossatz d'Aorlayachs, won the eglantine and was "crowned"
- Guillem Vetzinas, "sealed" winner in unknown year
- Jacme Rovira, won a debate with Palaol in 1386
- Jaume de Tolosa, "crowned" winner unknown year
- Johan Blanch, won the violet c. 1360
- Joan de Castellnou, completed the final version of the Leys around 1355
- Lorenç Mallol, submitted a figured verse for competition
- Luys Ycart, participant in unknown year
- Peire Duran de Limoux, won the violet in 1373
- Peire de Ladils, collaborator with Raimon de Cornet
- Peire de Monlasur, collaborator with Peire Duran
- Raimon de Cornet, called l'esprit le plus brillant (the most brilliant spirit) of the Consistori
- Ramenat Montaut, won the "joia" unknown year
- Ramon Galbarra, maintainer in 1355 and 1386

== Bibliography ==
- Boase, Roger (1977). The Origin and Meaning of Courtly Love: A Critical Study of European Scholarship. Manchester: Manchester University Press. ISBN 0-87471-950-X.
- Chaytor, Henry John (1933). A History of Aragon and Catalonia. London: Methuen Publishing.
- Duboul, Axel (1901). Les Deux Siècles de l'Académie des Jeux floraux I–II.
- Fraser, Veronica (1993). "The Influence of the Venerable Bede on the Fourteenth-Century Occitan Treatise". Rhetorica: A Journal of the History of Rhetoric. 11 (1). University of California Press: 51–61. doi:10.1525/rh.1993.11.1.51. JSTOR 10.1525/rh.1993.11.1.51.
- Gélis, François de (1912). Histoire critique des jeux floraux depuis leur origine jusqu'à leur transformation en Académie (1323-1694) (in French). p. 285.
- Paden, William D. (1995). "The Troubadours and the Albigensian Crusade: A Long View". Romance Philology. 49 (2): 168–191.
- Riquer, Martí de (1964). Història de la Literatura Catalana. Vol. 1. Barcelona: Edicions Ariel.
