= Viadera =

Lyric genre of Catalan and Occitan literature

The viadera (Catalan: [biəˈðeɾə, viaˈðeɾa], Occitan: viadeira [bjaˈðejɾɔ, viaˈdejɾɔ]; also spelled viadeyra or viandela) was a lyric genre of Catalan and Occitan literature invented by the troubadours. It was a dance song devised to lighten the burden of a long voyage or to enliven the trip. It was a popular as opposed to "high" form and only infrequently used by cultivated poets. According to the Catalan Cançoneret de Ripoll, it was la pus jusana spècies qui és en los cantàs (the most humble genre of song there is) and elsewhere it is called la més baixa espècie de cançons (the most base genre of song).

One of the more famous viadeyras was composed by Cerverí de Girona. It begins No.l prenatz lo fals marit ("Don't take that false husband") and is preserved in the Cançoner Gil. The theme of the song is that of a warning to a girl, either Jana delgada (delicate Joanna) or Na Delgada, a senhal meaning "delicate lady". The line jana delgada (read either as Jana delgada or ja, Na Delgada) is repeated after every two lines as a respos. The song has much in common with Galician-Portuguese cantigas de amigo.
