= Jacme Rovira =

Catalan poet

Jacme Rovira (Catalan: [ˈʒaɡmə ruˈβiɾə], Occitan: [ˈdʒaɡme ruˈβiɾa]; modern Catalan spelling: Jaume Rovira) was a Catalan poet who wrote in Occitan and competed within the Consistori del Gay Saber.

On 3 May 1386 Jacme participated in a partimen with Bernat de Palaol before the judges Ramon Galbarra and Germà de Gontaut. The dilemma before the poets was this: if a knight loves a lady who does not return his affection while another dame, of equal merit, loves him, but to her he is indifferent, whom should he serve? Bernat defended the claim of the second lady, while Jacme of the first. The judges found in favour of Jacme.

Jacme also wrote a seventy-two line piece beginning Qui vol al mon de fis pretz fama granda.

== Works ==
- Works of Jaume Rovira at Rialc.unina.it
