= Perdigon =

Early 13th-century French troubadour

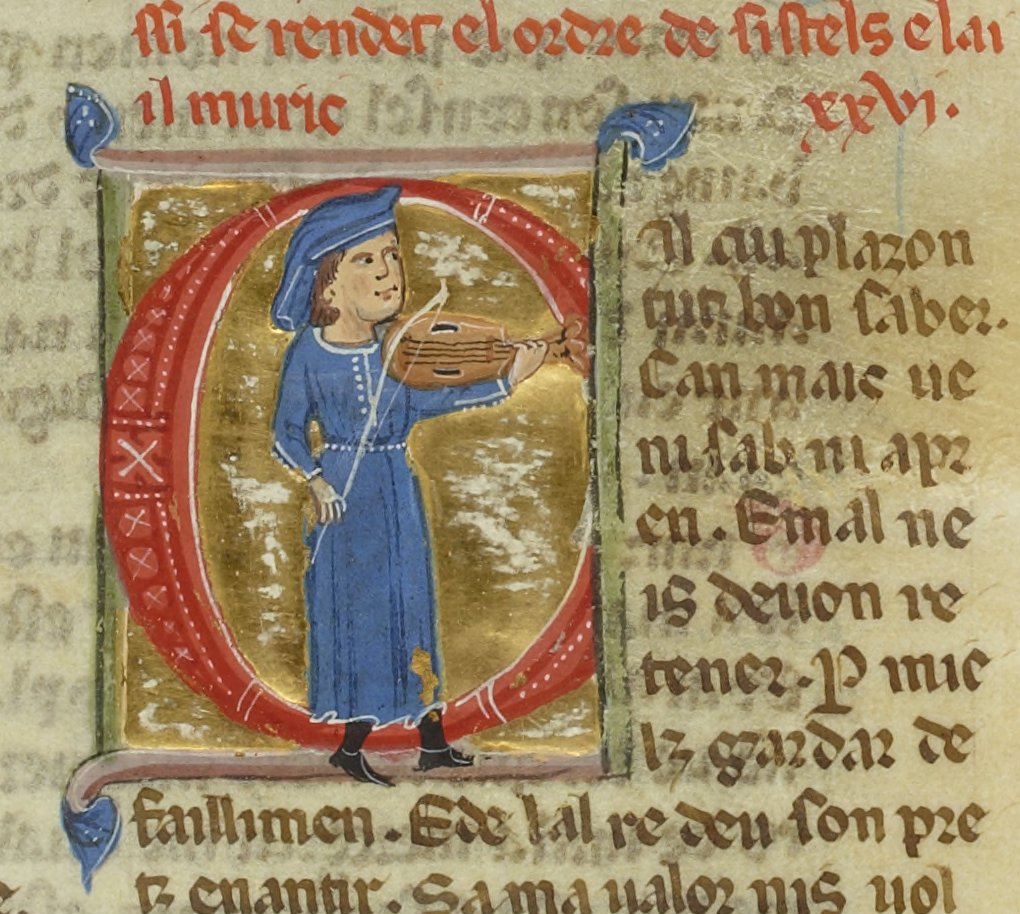
Perdigons si fo joglars e saup trop ben violar e trobar: "Perdigons was a minstrel and knew very well how to fiddle and invent songs."

Perdigon or Perdigo (fl. 1190–1220) was a troubadour from Lespéron in the Gévaudan. Fourteen of his works survive, including three cansos with melodies. He was respected and admired by contemporaries, judging by the widespread inclusion of his work in chansonniers and in citations by other troubadours.

Though his biography is made confounding by contradicting statements in his vida and allusions in his and others' poems, Perdigon's status as a jongleur from youth and an accomplished fiddler is well-attested in contemporary works (by him and others) and manuscript illustrations depicting him with his fiddle. Perdigon travelled widely and was patronised by Dalfi d'Alvernha, the House of Baux, (Note: Probably Guillem des Baux (Aubrey, p. 218)) Peter II of Aragon, and Barral of Marseille. His service to the latter provides an early definite date for his career, as Barral died in 1192 and Perdigon composed a canso—which survives with music—for him.

According to his vida, Perdigon was the son of a poor fisherman who excelled through his "wit and inventiveness" to honour and fame, was clothed and eventually armed, knighted, and granted land and rent by Dalfi d'Alvernha. After this period of his life, which is said to have lasted a long time, the manuscripts of his vida diverge. According to one version, death deprived him of his friends, male and female, and so he lost his position and entered a Cistercian monastery, where he died. That he entered a Cistercian monastery has never been proven, but has received some support from two of his works.

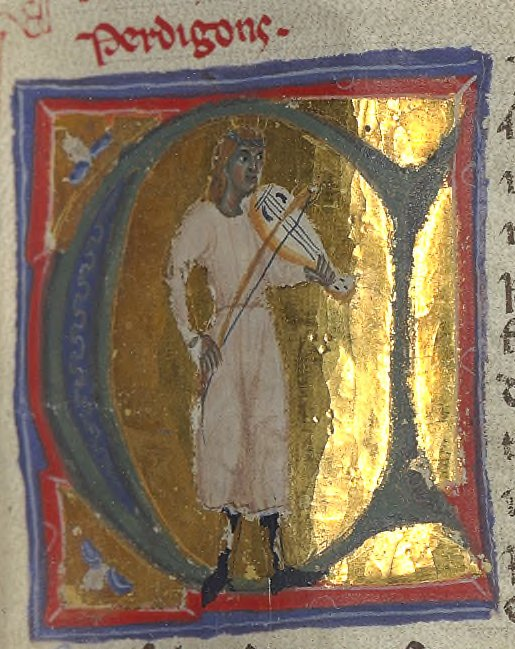
Perdigon, with his famous fiddle.

According to another version of his vida, he became a strong opponent of Catharism—a sect suppressed by the Catholic Church as heretical—and supported the Albigensian Crusade against them. He is said to have accompanied Guillem des Baux, Folquet de Marselha, and the Abbot of Cîteaux to Rome to oppose Raymond VI of Toulouse after the latter's excommunication in 1208. The author of the vida blames Perdigon for "[bringing] about and [arranging] all these deeds." The biographer further claims that Perdigon sang to the populace to encourage the Crusade and even boasted of humiliating Peter II of Aragon who opposed the Crusades and died at the Battle of Muret fighting against the Crusaders. For this reason he became despised by those in favor of Catharism, and due to the war lost all his friends who fought in it: Simon de Montfort, Guillem des Baux, (Note: This personage was the Prince of Orange, but it was probably a similarly named Uc des Baux with whom Perdigon was acquainted (Egan, p. 84).) and many others. In the end, the son of Dalfi d'Alvernha, abandoned him, confiscated his land, and sent him away. The biographer claims that he went to Lambert de Monteil and begged to be entered into the Cistercian monastery of "Silvabela", but the author incorrectly believes Lambert to be the son-in-law of Guillem des Baux, and the monastery Silvabela ("beautiful forest") never existed. His vidas are questionable.

Among Perdigon's surviving songs is a torneyamen with Raimbaut de Vaqueiras and Ademar de Peiteus. Unusually for the period, Perdigon, along with Aimeric de Peguilhan, through-composed his melodies.

== Notes ==
=== Sources ===
- Aubrey, Elizabeth. The Music of the Troubadours. Indiana University Press, 1996. ISBN 0-253-21389-4.
- Egan, Margarita, ed. and trans. The Vidas of the Troubadours. New York: Garland, 1984. ISBN 0-8240-9437-9.
- Perdigó, Luisa Marina. The Life, Poetry, and Music of the Provençal Troubadour Perdigon : Texts, Translations, and Interpretations. New York: Mellen Press, 2013. ISBN 978-0-7734-4523-9.
