= Raimbaut de Vaqueiras =

Provençal troubadour

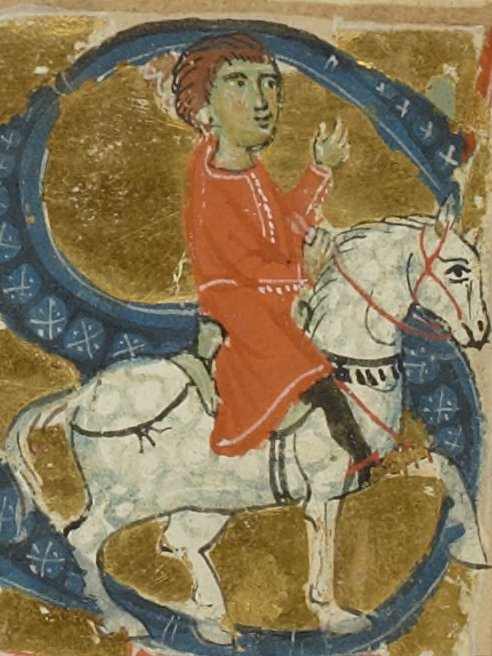
- Raimbaut de Vaqueiras, from a collection of troubadour songs, BNF Richelieu Manuscrits Français 854, Bibliothèque Nationale Française, Paris.
- Born: c. 1180; Vacqueyras, Provence
- Died: 4 September 1207; Rhodope Mountains
- Occupations: Troubadour and, later in his life, knight
- Notable work: Eras quan vey verdeyar

Raimbaut de Vaqueiras or Vaqueyras (fl. 1180 – 1207) was a Provençal troubadour and, later in his life, knight. His life was spent mainly in Italian courts until 1203, when he joined the Fourth Crusade. His writings, particularly the so-called Epic Letter, form an important commentary on the politics of the Latin Empire in its earliest years. Vaqueiras's works include a multilingual poem, Eras quan vey verdeyar where he used French, Tuscan, Galician-Portuguese and Gascon, together with his own Provençal.

Vaqueiras was from Vacqueyras, near Orange. He spent most of his career as court poet and close friend of Boniface I of Montferrat, with whom he served in battle against the communes of Asti and Alessandria. Vaqueiras claimed he earned a knighthood through protecting Boniface with his shield in battle at Messina, when they took part in Emperor Henry VI's invasion of Sicily. He was present at the siege and capture of Constantinople in 1204, and then accompanied Boniface to Thessalonica. It is generally presumed that Raimbaut died on 4 September 1207, together with Boniface, in an ambush by the Vlach.

The only critical edition of Vaqueiras attributes 33 extant songs to him; only eight of the associate melodies have survived. He used a wide range of styles, including a descort, several cansos and tensos, an alba and a gap; he, with Perdigon and Ademar de Peiteus, invented the torneyamen (or, at least, left us its earliest example). One of his songs, "Kalenda Maia", is referred to as an estampida and is considered one of the best troubadour melodies. However, according to the razó, he borrowed the tune from two other musicians. This would explain why the song is called an estampida, which is, theoretically, a purely instrumental piece.

== Vaqueiras in fiction ==
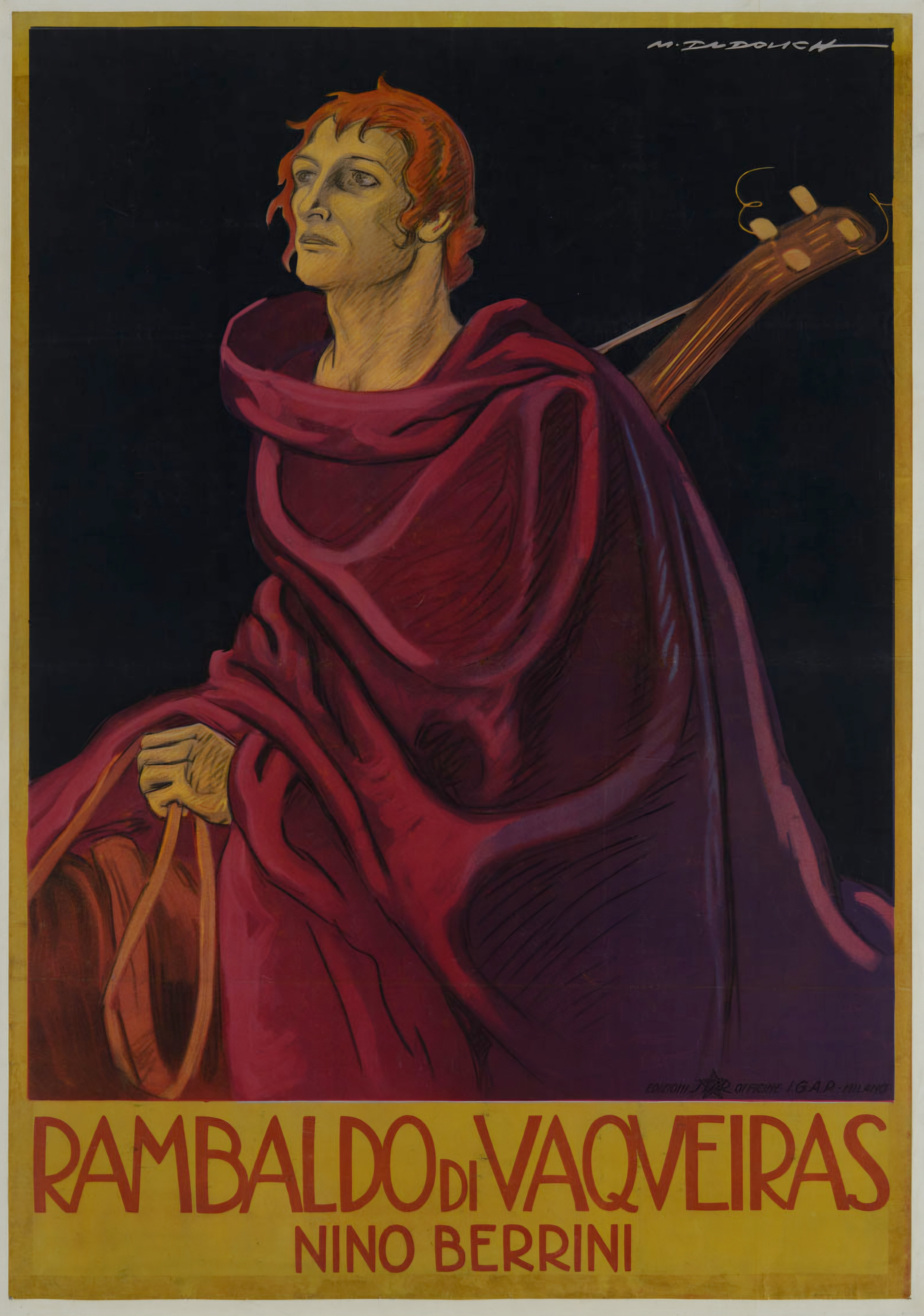
Poster by Marcello Dudovich advertising the premiere of Nino Berrini's Rambaldo di Vaqueiras

In 1922, Vaqueiras was the subject of a verse drama by Nino Berrini, Rambaldo di Vaqueiras: I Monferrato. Strongly derivative of Edmond Rostand's Cyrano de Bergerac and La Princesse Lointaine, it presents a highly romantic, fictionalised image of the poet, in love with his patron's daughter Beatrice. At the end, he returns, mortally wounded, from Thessalonica, to die in her arms.

Vaqueiras and the song "Kalenda Maya" are referenced disparagingly by the protagonist-narrator in Nicole Galland's novel Crossed: A Tale of the Fourth Crusade.

A similar fictionalised account of a courtly love relationship between Vaqueiras and Beatrice del Carretto (subject of Vaqueiras's early songs, daughter of Boniface of Montferrat and Helena del Bosco) is the subject of a short story, Miłość i płaszcz (The Love and the Cloak), by Teodor Parnicki, dating from the period between 1933–1939.

== Bibliography ==
- The poems of the troubadour Raimbaut de Vaqueiras. Edited and translated by Joseph Linskill. The Hague: Mouton, 1964.
- Raimbaut de Vaqueiras. "A French Minstrel and an Italian Lady" ("Domna, tant vos ai prejada"). Translated by Samantha Pious. Doublespeak (Spring 2020). Online.
