= Dansa =

A dansa (Old Occitan: [ˈdansa, ˈdaⁿsa]), also spelt dança, was an Old Occitan form of lyric poetry developed in the late thirteenth century among the troubadours. It is related to the English term "dance" and was often accompanied by dancing. A closely related form, the balada or balaresc, had a more complex structure, and is related to the ballade but unrelated to the ballad. Both terms derive from Occitan words for "to dance": dansar and balar/ballar.

A dansa begins with a respos of one or two lines, whose rhyme scheme matches that of the first line or two of each subsequent stanza. The actual respos may have been repeated between stanzas, of which there were usually three, as a refrain. The few surviving melodies of dansas seem like incipient virelais. The verses of the dansa were sung by a soloist while the refrain was sung by a choir. A dansa lacking a vuelta is called a danseta.

In a balada each stanza is divided into three parts. The first part and second part are identical, each ending with the same rhyme as the first line of the poem. The third part of the stanza is identical to the refrain (refranh) in form. The refrain, which begins the song, is repeated after each stanza. In a balada the lines of the choir and the soloist could mix.

A desdansa (or desdança) was the opposite of a dansa, not in form but in content. Whereas a dansa had joyful lyrics and lively music, a desdansa was sad and lamenting, much like a planh designed for dance. The desdansa is defined, and exemplified, in the Cançoneret de Ripoll.

== List ==
balada baladeta dansa hybrid genre

Composer	Incipit (i.e. title)	Date	Notes
Guiraut d'Espaigna	Be volgra, s'esser pogues		
Guiraut d'Espaigna	Domna, si tot no.us es preza		
Guiraut d'Espaigna	Gen m'auci		
Guiraut d'Espaigna	Ges ancara		
Guiraut d'Espaigna	Lo fi cor qu'ie.us ai		Sometimes called a balada or dansa
Guiraut d'Espaigna	No posc plus sofrir		
Guiraut d'Espaigna	Na Ses Merce		
Guiraut d'Espaigna	Per amor soi gai		A pastorela in the form of a dansa
Guiraut d'Espaigna	Pos ses par		
Guiraut d'Espaigna	Sa gaja semblansa		
Guiraut d'Espaigna	Si la bela que.m plai no.m plai		
Guiraut d'Espaigna	Si.l dous jois d'amor		
Guiraut d'Espaigna	Si no.m secor domna gaja		
Paulet de Marseilla	Bela domna plazens, ai		
Cerveri de Girona	A la pluga a.l vent iran		A balada that Serveri labels an espingadura
Cerveri de Girona	Com es ta mal ensenyada		A dansa that Serveri labels a peguesca
Cerveri de Girona	No.l prenatz los fals marit iana delgada		A balada that Serveri labels a viadeyra
Cerveri de Girona	Pus on vey leys		
Cerveri de Girona	Si voletz que.m laix d'amar		
Cerveri de Girona	Tant ay el cor d'alegrança		A sirventes–dansa
Cerveri de Girona	Tot can cors dezira		
Uc de Saint Circ	Una danseta voil far		
	A l'entrada del temps clar		
	Amors m'art con fuoc ab flama		Perhaps a fragmentary canso
	Ara l'ausetz		Perhaps a parody (parodique) of a dansa
	Coindeta sui, si cum n'ai greu cossire		
	D'amor m'estera ben e gent		
	Mort m'an li semblan que ma dona.m fai		
	Plazens plasers, tant vos am e.us dezir		Consists of a single cobla
	Pos la dousor del temps gay		
	Pos qu'ieu vey la fuella		Two coblas, perhaps a single canso
	Pres soi ses faillencha		Two coblas, perhaps a single canso
	Quant lo gilos er fora		
	S'anc vos		
	Se nus hom per ben servir		
	Si tot chantar non m'enansa		
	Tant es gay'es avinentz		A fragment: two coblas, probably of a dansa, perhaps a canso
