= Israel ben Joseph Halevi Caslari =

Provençal Jewish physician and poet (f. 14th century)

Israel ben Joseph Halevi Caslari (Occitan: [izraˈɛl ˈβen ʒuˈzɛf haˈlɛvi kazˈlaɾi], Catalan: [izrəˈɛl ˈβen ʒuˈzɛf həˈlɛvi kəzˈlaɾi]), also known as Crescas Caslari and Israel ben Joseph Halevi, was a Jewish physician and poet who lived at Avignon in 1327. He was the author of a liturgic poem for Purim, beginning with the words מי כמוך ("Who is like you?"). In a manuscript of this poem (Rev. Et. Juives, ix. 116) the signature contains the words לבני יצהר ("To the sons of Yitzhar"), from which Neubauer concludes that Crescas Caslari belonged to the family of the Yitzhari. This opinion, shared by Leopold Zunz, is criticized by Gross, who holds that the appellation is merely honorary, as it is in the Bible (Zech. iv. 14).

According to Zunz, Caslari was the author of a poem on the story of Esther and Mordecai, which he translated into the vernacular. A fragment of a Provençal poem by Maestro Crescas has been published in Romania (April, 1892). Caslari also translated Arnaud de Villeneuve's medical work entitled Liber de Regimine Sanitatis, dedicating it to James II of Aragon.
