= Raimon Vidal de Bezaudun =

13th-century Catalan troubadour

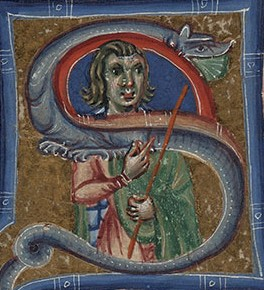
Raimon Vidal in chansonnier N

Raimon Vidal de Bezaudu(n) (Catalan: Ramon Vidal de Besalú) (flourished early 13th century) was a Catalan troubadour from Besalú. He is notable for authoring the first tract in a Romance language (Occitan) on the subject of grammar and poetry, the Razós de trobar (c. 1210), (Note: The similar Donatz proensals of Uc Faidit was also produced around this time.) a title which translates as "Reasons (or Guidelines) of troubadour composition". He began his career as a joglar and he spent his formative years at the court of Hug de Mataplana, which he often recalls fondly in his poems and songs.

In the Razós, Raimon distinguishes the "parladura francesa" (French) from the "cella de Lemosin" (Occitan). He also discusses the art of the listener (li auzidor) and his responsibility to understand the troubadour works. Raimon's insistence that the audience understand what is sung and that they keep silent during its singing has been regarded as seminal in the history of classical music. To him, listeners have a responsibility to enquire about what they do not understand (which is "one of the wisest things in the world") and to be true to the quality of the work, praising greatness and condemning poor form. Vidal also took pains to argue for the superiority of lemosí (or Lemozi, i.e., Occitan) over other vernaculars, prompting the Florentine poet Dante Alighieri to write a De Vulgari Eloquentia justifying the use of the Tuscan vernacular as opposed to the Occitan. The Razós ends with an Occitan-Italian glossary. Late in the 13th century, Terramagnino of Pisa wrote a condensed verse form of the Razós. Jofre de Foixà wrote an expanded version, the Regles de trobar, for James II of Sicily.

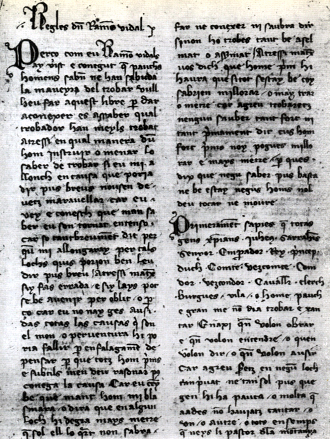
The Razos de trobar in a Catalan manuscript

In addition to the aforementioned tract, there are preserved several fragments of song lyrics and three narrative romans. Among his most famous is So fo e·l temps qu'om era gais, which is fawning in its treatment of Raimon de Miraval, an earlier troubadour. In the nova, Raimon presents two ladies as fighting over one knight. The nova or ensenhamen called Abril issi'e mays intrava, which also refers to Miraval (and to the three sons of Henry II of England: Enricx, Richartz, and Jofrés), is an assessment of contemporary literature and one of the best descriptions of the joglar that we possess. Finally, the Castiagilós is much like a fable, which narrates the story of a jealous husband who is eventually convinced that his suspicions are baseless.

Vidal wrote at the height of the troubadours' popularity and as he himself said:

"all people wish to listen to troubadour songs and to compose (trobar) them, including Christians, Saracens, Jews, emperors, princes, kings, dukes, counts, viscounts, vavassours, knights, clerics, townsmen, and villeins."
Tota gens Crestiana, Juzeus e Sarazís, emperador, princeps, rei, duc, conte, vesconte, contor, valvasor e tuit autre cavailler e clergues borgés e vilanz.

== Sources ==
- Ewert, A. (1940). "Dante's Theory of Language". The Modern Language Review. 35 (3): 355–366. doi:10.2307/3716632. JSTOR 3716632.
- Faidit, Uc; Vidal, Raimon; Guessard, François (1858). Grammaires provençales de Hugues Faidit et de Raymond Vidal de Besaudun (XIII^{e} siècle) (2nd ed.). Paris: A. Franck.
- Lewent, Kurt (1946). "The Troubadours and the Romance of Jaufre". Modern Philology. 43 (3): 153–169. doi:10.1086/388685. JSTOR 434704. S2CID 162238781.
- Paden, William D. (1993). "Old Occitan as a Lyric Language: The Insertions from Occitan in Three Thirteenth-Century French Romances". Speculum. 68 (1): 36–53. doi:10.2307/2863833. JSTOR 2863833. S2CID 162067124.
- Page, Christopher (1997). "Listening to the Trouvères". Early Music. 25 (4): 638–650, 653–656, and 659. doi:10.1093/em/25.4.638. JSTOR 3128410.
- Smythe, Barbara (1921). "Troubadour Songs". Music & Letters. 2 (3): 263–273. doi:10.1093/ml/II.3.263. JSTOR 726061.
- Taylor, Andrew (1992). "Fragmentation, Corruption, and Minstrel Narration: The Question of the Middle English Romances". The Yearbook of English Studies. 22 (Medieval Narrative Special Number): 38–62. doi:10.2307/3508375. JSTOR 3508375.
- Topsfield, L. T. (1956). "Raimon de Miraval and the Art of Courtly Love". The Modern Language Review. 51 (1): 33–41. doi:10.2307/3718257. JSTOR 3718257.
- Weiss, R. (1942). "Links between the "Convivio" and the 'De Vulgari Eloquentia'". The Modern Language Review. 37 (2): 156–168. doi:10.2307/3717624. JSTOR 3717624.
