= Piva (bagpipe) =

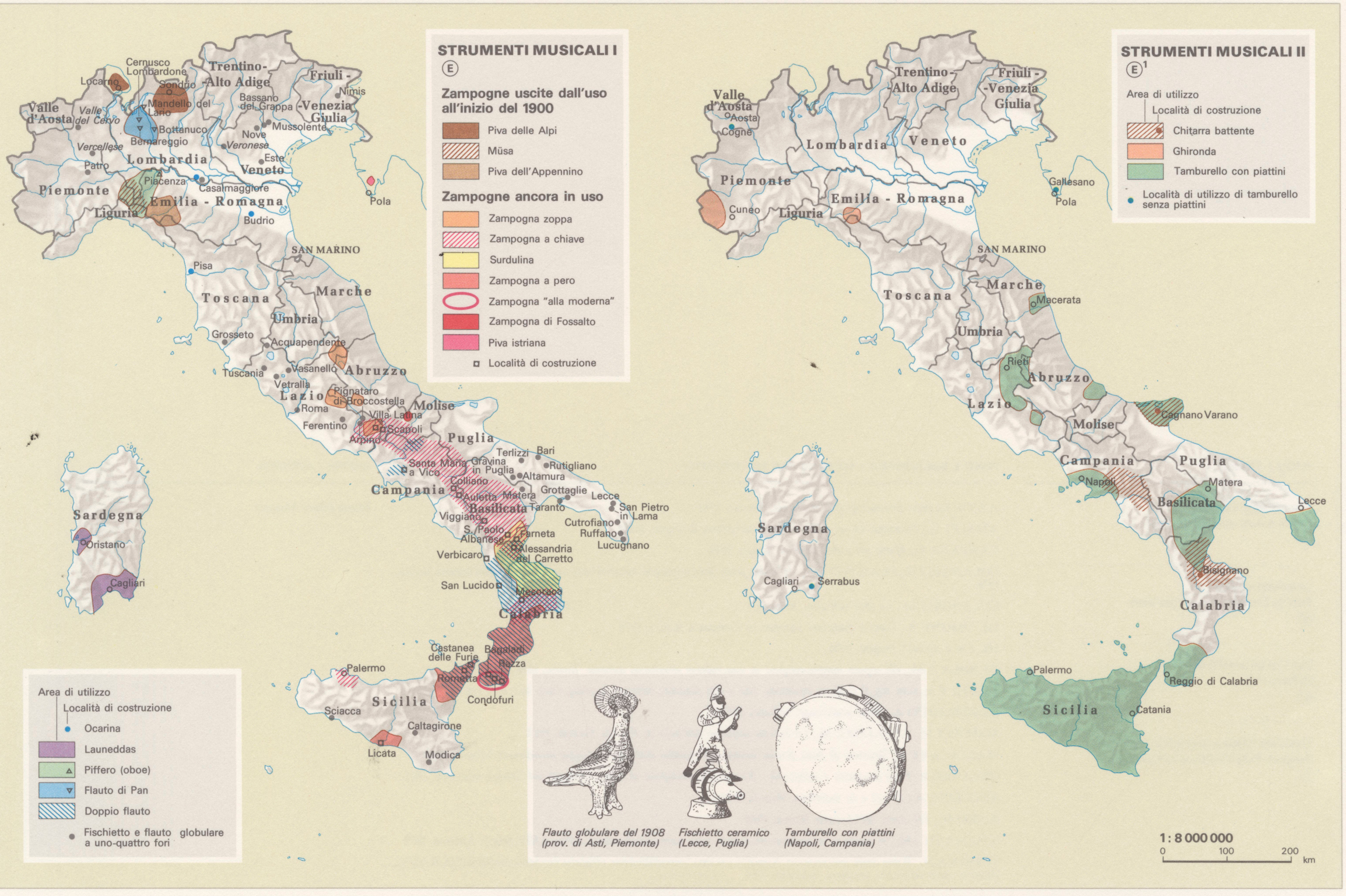
Map folk musical instruments in Italy; different kind of piva are in brown, light brown and dark pink

The piva is a type of bagpipe played in Italy and in Ticino, the Italian-speaking Canton of Switzerland. The instrument has a single chanter and single drone. A different instrument with the same name is also known in Istria region of Croatia.

Illustrations and scriptural evidences tend to suggest that a similar instrument was also used in Veneto.

In Italy it was traditionally played in an ensemble with the piffero (folk oboe) until the piva was replaced by the accordion in the 1950s.

The piva appears to have died out in Switzerland in the 19th century, but was revived in 1980 by Swiss-German folk musician Urs Klauser.
