= Cobla esparsa =

Single-stanza poem in troubadour poetry

A cobla esparsa (Old Occitan: [ˈkobla esˈpaɾsa] literally meaning "scattered stanza") in Old Occitan is the name used for a single-stanza poem in troubadour poetry. They constitute about 15% of the troubadour output, and they are the dominant form among late (after 1220) authors like Bertran Carbonel and Guillem de l'Olivier. The term cobla triada is used by modern scholars to indicate a cobla taken from a longer poem and let stand on its own, but its original medieval meaning was a cobla esparsa taken from a larger collection of such poems, since coblas esparsas were usually presented in large groupings.

Sometimes, two authors would write a cobla esparsa each, in a cobla exchange; this corresponds, in a shorter form, to the earlier tenso or partimen. Whether such exchanges should be regarded as a "genre" unto themselves, as a type of short tenso, or as coblas esparsas, one of which happens to be written in response to the other, is debated. The Cançoneret de Ripoll distinguishes between the cobles d'acuyndamens, which bonds of vassalage, love, or fidelity, and cobles de qüestions, which posed dilemmas. The acuyndamentum was a special bond of vassallage-fidelity in medieval Catalonia.
