= Partimen =

The partimen (Occitan: [paɾtiˈmen, paʀtiˈme]; Catalan: partiment [pəɾtiˈmen]; also known as partia or joc partit) is a cognate form of the French jeu-parti (plural jeux-partis). It is a genre of Occitan lyric poetry composed between two troubadours, a subgenre of the tenso or cobla exchange in which one poet presents a dilemma in the form of a question and the two debate the answer, each taking up a different side. Of the nearly 200 surviving Occitan debate songs, 120 are partimens and 75 are open tensos. The partimen was especially popular in poetic contests. See also Torneyamen.
