= Occitan literature =

Occitan literature (referred to in older texts as Provençal literature) is a body of texts written in Occitan, mostly in the south of France. It was the first literature written in a Romance language and inspired the rise of vernacular literature throughout medieval Europe. Occitan literature's Golden Age was in the 12th century, when a rich and complex body of lyrical poetry was produced by troubadours writing in Old Occitan, which still survives to this day. Although Catalan is considered by some a variety of Occitan, this article will not deal with Catalan literature, which started diverging from its Southern French counterpart in the late 13th century.

== Introduction ==
Occitan literature started in the 11th century in several centres. It gradually spread first over the greater portion (though not the whole) of southern France, into what is now the north of Italy and into Spain (Catalonia, Galicia, Castile), and Portugal.

In its rise, Occitan literature stands completely by itself, and in its development, it long continued to be highly original. It presents at several points, analogies with French literature; but these analogies are due principally to certain primary elements common to both and only in a slight degree to mutual reaction.

== Origin ==
Occitan poetry first appeared in the 11th century. The oldest surviving text is the Provençal burden (Fr. refrain) attached to a 10th-century Latin poem. The text has not yet been satisfactorily interpreted. The quality of the earliest remaining works suggest earlier work was lost.

The earliest Occitan poem is a 10th-century, seventeen-line charm Tomida femina probably for dispersing the pain of childbirth. Much longer is an 11th-century fragment of two hundred and fifty-seven decasyllabic verses preserved in an Orléans manuscript, first printed by Raynouard. The linguistic features of the poem suggest it originated in Limousin or Marche in the north of the Occitan region. The unknown author takes Boethius's treatise De consolatione philosophiae as the groundwork of his composition. The poem is a didactic piece composed by a clerk. The Cançó de Santa Fe dates from 1054–1076, but probably represents a Catalan dialect that evolved into a distinct language from Occitan. From the same century there is Las, qu'i non sun sparvir, astur, a secular love poem.

From the close of the same century are the poems of William (Guilhem) IX, the grandfather of Eleanor of Aquitaine. They consist of eleven diverse strophic pieces, and were consequently meant to be sung. Several are love songs. The only one which can be approximately dated was composed around 1119, when William was setting out for Spain to fight the Saracens. It expresses the writer's regret for the frivolity of his past life and his apprehensions as he bade farewell to his country and his young son. We also know from Ordericus Vitalis that William had composed various poems on the incidents of his ill-fated Crusade of 1101. In one of his pieces Ben voil que sapchon ii plusor he makes an allusion to the partimen.

The origins of this poetry are uncertain. It bears no relation to Latin poetry, nor to folklore. Vernacular compositions seem to have been at first produced for the amusement, or in the case of religious poetry, for the edification, of that part of lay society which had leisure and lands, and reckoned intellectual pastime among the good things of life.

In the 11th century, vernacular poetry served mainly the amusement and edification of the upper class. By the 12th and 13th centuries, historical works and popular treatises on contemporary science were composed in the vernacular.

Occitan poetry may have originated amongst the jesters. Some, leaving buffoonery to the ruder and less intelligent members of the profession, devoted themselves to the composition of pieces intended for singing. In the north, the jesters produced chansons de geste full of tales of battle and combat. In the courts of the southern nobles they produced love songs.

== Age of the troubadours ==
Starting in the early 12th century, the best-known body of Occitan literature originated with the group of poets who would later become known as troubadours, from the verb "trobar", meaning "to invent". The troubadours used a standardized form of Old Occitan (one probably based on the dialect of Limoges), sang their pieces to music and generally used complex and elaborate meters. Their poetry was usually lyrical, with a minority of pieces of satirical, political, moralistic, religious or erotic nature.

=== Early period ===
The first known troubadour was William IX, Duke of Aquitaine whose works gave the movement a position of honor, and indirectly contributed in a very powerful degree to ensure its development and preservation.

Shortly after him, centres of poetic activity made their appearance in various places, first in Limousin and Gascony. In the former province lived Ebolus cantator (a singer named Eble), who during the second part of William of Poitiers' life seems to have been brought into relation with him, and according to a contemporary historian, Geoffroy, prior of Vigeois, erat valde gratiosus in cantilenis ("gave a great deal of pleasure by his songs"). None of his compositions survive; but under his influence Bernart of Ventadour was trained to poetry, who, though only the son of one of the serving-men of the castle, managed to gain the love of the lady of Ventadour, and when on the discovery of their amour he had to depart elsewhere, received a gracious welcome from Eleanor of Aquitaine, consort (from 1152) of Henry II of England. Of Bernart's compositions we possess about fifty songs of elegant simplicity, some of which may be taken as the most perfect specimens of love poetry Occitan literature has ever produced. Bernart must therefore have been in repute before the middle of the 12th century; and his poetic career extended well on towards its close.

At the same period, or probably a little earlier, flourished Cercamon, of genuine importance among the troubadours both because of his early date and because definite information regarding him has been preserved. He was a Gascon, and composed, says his old biographer, pastorals according to the ancient custom (pastorelas a la uzansa antiga). This is the record of the appearance in the south of France of a poetic form which ultimately acquired large development. The period at which Cercamon lived is determined by a piece where he alludes very clearly to the approaching marriage of the king of France, Louis VII, with Eleanor of Aquitaine (1137). Among the earliest troubadours may also be reckoned Marcabru, a pupil of Cercamon, from whose pen we have about forty pieces, those which can be approximately dated ranging from 1135 to 1148 or thereabout. This poet has great originality of thought and style. His songs, several of which are historical, are free from the commonplaces of their class, and contain curious strictures on the corruptions of the time.

=== Golden age: trobar leu, troubar clus, and trobar ric ===
This article cannot do more than enumerate the leading troubadours and briefly indicate in what conditions their poetry was developed and through what circumstances it fell into decay and finally disappeared: Peire d'Alvernha, who in certain respects must be classed with Marcabru; Arnaut Daniel, remarkable for his complicated versification, the inventor of the sestina, a poetic form for which Dante and Petrarch express an admiration difficult for us to understand; Arnaut de Mareuil; Bertran de Born, now the most generally known of all the troubadours on account of the part he is said to have played both by his sword and his sirveniescs in the struggle between Henry II of England and his rebel sons, though the importance of his part in the events of the time seems to have been greatly exaggerated; Peire Vidal of Toulouse, a poet of varied inspiration who grew rich with gifts bestowed on him by the greatest nobles of his time; Guiraut de Borneil, lo macsire dels trobadors, and at any rate master in the art of the so-called close style (trebar clus), though he has also left us some songs of charming simplicity; Gaucelm Faidit, from whom we have a touching lament (plaint) on the death of Richard Cœur de Lion; Folquet of Marseille, the most powerful thinker among the poets of the south, who from being a merchant and troubadour became an abbot, and finally bishop of Toulouse (died 1231).

=== Later troubadours, and foreign ones ===
As the troubadours started scattering from Southern France after the Albigensian crusade, the quality of their poetry decayed sharply: Dante, in his De vulgari eloquentia mentions only authors of the previous generation (Peire d'Alvernha, Giraut de Bornelh, Bertran de Born and Arnaut Daniel) as models of vernacular literature. However, the presence of troubadours in foreign courts engendered a number of imitators in Catalonia (for example Cerverì de Girona) and Italy (Sordello, Lanfranc Cigala, Rambertino Buvalelli).

=== Troubadours and society ===
It is not without interest to discover to what social classes the troubadours belonged. Many of them, there is no doubt, had a very humble origin. Bernart of Ventadour's father was a servant, Peire Vidal's a maker of furred garments, Perdigon's a fisher. Others belonged to the bourgeoisie, Peire d'Alvernha, for example, Peire Raimon of Toulouse, and Elias Fonsalada. Likewise we see merchants' sons as troubadours; this was the case with Folquet of Marseille and Aimeric de Peguilhan. A great many were clerics, or at least studied for the Church, for instance, Arnaut de Mareuil, Uc de Saint Circ, Aimeric de Belenoi, Hugh Brunet, Peire Cardenal; some had even taken orders: the monk of Montaudon and Gaubert de Puicibot. Ecclesiastical authority did not always tolerate this breach of discipline. Gui d'Ussel, canon and troubadour, was obliged by the injunction of the pontifical legate to give up his song-making; Folquet, too, renounced it when he took orders. One point is particularly striking, the number of monarchs and nobles who were troubadours: Raimon de Miraval, Pons de Capdoill, Guilhem Ademar, Cadenet, Peirol, Raimbaut de Vacqueiras, and many more. Some of this group were poor knights whose incomes were insufficient to support their rank, and took up poetry not merely for their own pleasure, but for the sake of the gifts to be obtained from the rich whose courts they frequented. A very different position was occupied by such wealthy and powerful people as William of Poitiers, Raimbaut d'Aurenga, the viscount of Saint Antonin, Guillem de Berguedà and Blacatz.

The profession was entirely dependent on the existence and prosperity of the feudal courts. The troubadours could hardly expect to obtain a livelihood from any other quarter than the generosity of the great. It will consequently be well to mention the more important at least of those princes who are known to have been patrons and some of them practisers of the poetic art. They are arranged approximately in geographical order, and after each are inserted the names of those troubadours with whom they were connected.

=== Patronage ===
While the troubadours found protectors in Catalonia, Castile and Italy, they do not seem to have been welcomed in French-speaking countries. This, however, must not be taken too absolutely. Occitan poetry was appreciated in the north of France. There is reason to believe that when Constance, daughter of one of the counts of Arles, was married in 1001 to Robert, king of France, she brought along with her Provençal jongleurs. Poems by troubadours are quoted in the French romances of the beginning of the 13th century; some of them are transcribed in the old collections of French songs, and the preacher Robert de Sorbon informs us in a curious passage that one day a jongleur sang a poem by Folquet of Marseilles at the court of the king of France. Since the countries of the langue d'oil had a full developed literature of their own, the troubadours generally preferred to go to regions where they had less competition.

The decline and fall of troubadour poetry was mainly due to political causes. When about the beginning of the 13th century the Albigensian Crusade led by the French king had decimated and ruined the nobility and reduced to lasting poverty a part of the Occitan territories, the profession of troubadour ceased to be lucrative. It was then that many of those poets went to spend their last days in the north of Spain and Italy, where Occitan poetry had for more than one generation been highly esteemed. Following their example, other poets who were not natives of the south of France began to compose in Occitan, and this fashion continued till, about the middle of the 13th century, they gradually abandoned the foreign tongue in northern Italy, and somewhat later in Catalonia, and took to singing the same airs in the local dialects. About the same time in the Provençal region the flame of poetry had died out save in a few places, Narbonne, Rodez, Foix and Astarac where it kept burning feebly for a little longer. In the 14th century, composition in the language of the country was still practised; but the productions of this period are mainly works for instruction and edification, translations from Latin or sometimes even from French, with an occasional romance. As for the poetry of the troubadours, it was dead for ever.

==== France ====
Patrons and their troubadours in France:

- Henry the Young King, son of Henry II of England: Bertran de Born (?)
- Richard Coeur de Lion: Arnaut Daniel, Peire Vidal, Folquet de Marselha, Gaucelm Faidit
- Ermengarde of Narbonne (1143–1192): Bernart de Ventadour, Peire Rogier, Peire d'Alvernha
- Raimon V, count of Toulouse (1143–1194): Bernart de Ventadour, Peire Rogier, Peire Raimon, Hugh Brunet, Peire Vidal, Folquet de Marselha, Bernart de Durfort
- Raimon VI, count of Toulouse (1194–1222): Raimon de Miraval, Aimeric de Peguihan, Aimeric de Belenoi, Ademar le Negre, Savaric de Malleo
- Alfonso II, count of Provence (1185–1209): Elias de Barjols
- Raimon Berenguer IV, count of Provence (1209–1245): Sordello
- Raymond Geoffrey II of Marseille (d. 1192): Peire Vidal, Folquet de Marselha
- Maria de Ventadorn (d. 1222), Gaucelm Faidit, Gui d'Ussel
- William VIII of Montpellier (1172–1204): Peire Raimon, Arnaut de Mareuil, Folquet de Marselha, Guiraut de Calanson, Aimeric de Sarlat
- Dalfi d'Alvernha (1169–1234): Peirol, Perdigon, Peire de Maensac, Gaucelm Faidit, Uc de Saint Circ
- Guillaume des Baux, prince of Orange (1182–1218): Raimbaut de Vacqueiras, Perdigon
- Savaric de Malleo (1200–1230): Jausbert de Puycibot, Uc de Saint Circ
- Blacatz, a Provençal noble (1200–1236): Cadenet, Jean d'Aubusson, Sordello, Guillem Figueira
- Hugh II, count of Rodez (1156–1208): Uc Brunet, Bernart de Venzac
- Henry I, count of Rodez (1208–c.1222): Uc de Saint Circ
- Hugh IV (1222–1274) and Henry II (1274–1302), counts of Rodez: Guiraut Riquier, Folquet de Lunel, Serveri de Girone, Bertran Carbonel
- Nuño Sánchez, count of Roussillon (d. 1241): Aimeric de Belenoi
- Bernard IV d'Astarac (1249–1291): Guiraut Riquier, Amanieu de Sescas

==== Aragon ====
Patrons and their troubadours in Aragon:

- Alfonso II of Aragon (1162–1196): Peire Rogier, Peire Raimon, Peire Vidal, Cadenet, Guiraut de Cabreira, Elias de Barjols, the Monk of Montaudon, Hugh Brunet
- Peter II of Aragon (1196–1213): Raimon de Miraval, Aimeric de Pegulhan, Perdigon, Ademar lo Negre, Hugh of Saint Circq
- James I of Aragon (1213–1276): Peire Cardinal, Bernart Sicart de Maruejols, Guiraut Riquier, At de Mons
- Peter III of Aragon (1276–1285): Paulet of Marseilles, Guiraut Riquier, Serveri de Girone

==== Castile and Leon ====
Patrons and their troubadours in Castile and Leon:

- Alfonso IX of León (1138–1214): Elias Cairel, Peire Rogier, Guiraut de Borneil, Aimeric de Pegulhan, Hugh de Saint Circq
- Alfonso VIII of Castile (1158–1214): Uc de Lescura
- Alfonso X of Castile (1252–1284): Bertran de Lamanon, Bonifaci Calvo, Guiraut Riquier, Folquet de Lund, Arnaut Plages, Bertran Carbonel

==== Italy ====
Patrons and their troubadours in the Italian peninsula:

- Boniface II of Montferrat (1192–1207): Peire Vidal, Raimbaut de Vacqueiras, Elias Cairel, Gaucelm Faidit (?)
- Frederick II, Holy Roman Emperor, emperor (1215–1250): Jean d'Aubusson, Aimeric de Pegulhan, Guillem Figueira
- Azzo VI, marquis of Este (1196–1212): Airneric de Pegulhan, Rambertin de Buvalelli
- Azzo VII, marquis of Este (1215–1264): Aimeric de Pegulhan

== Form ==
Originally the poems of the troubadours were intended to be sung. The poet usually composed the music as well as the words; and in several cases he owed his fame more to his musical than to his literary ability. Two manuscripts preserve specimens of the music of the troubadours, but, though the subject has been recently investigated, we are hardly able to form a clear opinion of the originality and of the merits of these musical compositions. The following are the principal poetic forms which the troubadours employed. The oldest and most usual generic term is vers, by which is understood any composition intended to be sung, no matter what the subject. At the close of the 12th century, it became customary to call all verse treating of love canso the name vers being then more generally reserved for poems on other themes. The sirventesc differs from the vers and the canso only by its subject, being for the most part devoted to moral and political topics.

Peire Cardinal is celebrated for the sirventescs he composed against the clergy of his time. The political poems of Bertran de Born are sirventescs. There is reason to believe that originally this word meant simply a poem composed by a sirvent (Latin serviens) or man-at-arms. The sirventesc is very frequently composed in the form, sometimes even with rhymes, of a love song having acquired some popularity, so that it might be sung to the same air. The tenson is a debate between two interlocutors, each of whom has a stanza, or more generally a group of lines (each group having the same structure) in turn.

The partimen (French jeu parti) is also a poetic debate, but it differs from the tenson insofar that the range of debate is limited. In the first stanza one of the partners proposes two alternatives; the other partner chooses one of them and defends it, the opposite side remaining to be defended by the original propounder. Often in a final couplet a judge or arbiter is appointed to decide between the parties. This poetic game is mentioned by William, count of Poitiers, at the end of the 11th century. The pastoreta, afterwards pastorela, is in general an account of the love adventures of a knight with a shepherdess. All these classes have one form capable of endless variations: five or more stanzas and one or two envois. The dansa and balada, intended to mark the time in dancing, are pieces with a refrain. The aubade, which has also a refrain, is, as the name indicates, a waking or morning song at the dawning of the day. All those classes are in stanzas. The descort is not thus divided, and consequently it must be set to music right through. Its name is derived from the fact that, its component parts not being equal, there is a kind of discord between them. It is generally reserved for themes of love. Other kinds of lyric poems, sometimes with nothing new about them except the name, were developed in the Occitan regions; but those here mentioned are the more important.

=== Narrative poetry ===
Although the lyrical poetry of the troubadours formed the most original part of Occitan literature, it was not the only kind. Narrative poetry, especially, received in Occitania a great development, and, thanks to recent discoveries, a considerable body of it has already become known. Several classes must be distinguished: the chanson de geste, legendary or apparently historical, the romance of adventure and the novel. All these poems are in the form of chansons de geste, that is, in stanzas of indefinite length, with a single rhyme.

One notable example is the saga of Girart de Roussillon, a poem of ten thousand verses, which relates the struggles of Charles Martel with his powerful vassal the Burgundian Gerard of Roussillon. Girart de Roussillon belongs only within certain limits to the Occitan literature, as it exists in two versions, one in Old Occitan and one in a hybrid language, which seems to have originated on the borders of Limousin and Poitou; both are probably a recast of an older poem, probably either of French or Burgundian origin, which is no longer extant.

To Limousin also seems to belong the poem of Aigar and Maurin (end of the 12th century), of which we have only a fragment so short that the subject cannot be clearly made out.

Of less heroic character is the poem of Daurel and Beton (first half of the 13th century), connected with the cycle of Charlemagne but, judging by the romantic character of the events, more like a regular romance of adventure. We cannot, however, form a complete judgment in regard to it, as the only manuscript in which it has been preserved is defective at the close, and that to an amount there is no means of ascertaining.

Midway between legend and history may be classified the Cansó d'Antioca, a mere fragment of which, 700 verses, has been recovered in Madrid and published in Archives de l'Orient latin, vol. ii. This poem, which seems to have been composed by a Gregory Bechada, mentioned in a 12th-century chronicle and written in Limousin is one of the sources of the Spanish compilation La gran conquista de Ultramar.

To history proper belongs the Song of the Albigensian Crusade, which, in its present state, is composed of two poems tacked onto each other: the first, containing the events from the beginning of the crusade till 1213, is the work of a cleric named William of Tudela, a moderate supporter of the crusaders; the second, from 1213 to 1218, is by a vehement opponent of the enterprise. The language and style of the two parts differs as well.

Finally, around 1280, Guillaume Anelier, a native of Toulouse, composed a poem on the war carried on in Navarre by the French in 1276 and 1277. It is an historical work of little literary merit.

Gerard of Roussillon, Aigar and Maurin and Daurel and Beton are in verses of ten, the others in verses of twelve syllables. The peculiarity of the versification in Gerard is that the pause in the line occurs after the sixth syllable, and not, as is usual, after the fourth.

Like the chanson de geste, the romance of adventure is but slightly represented in the south; but it is to be remembered that many works of this class must have perished, as evidenced by the fact that, with few exceptions, the narrative poems which survived are known by a single manuscript only. Only three Provençal romances of adventure are extant, Jaufri (composed in the middle of the 13th century and dedicated to a king of Aragon, possibly James I), Blandin of Cornwall and Guillem de La Barra. The first two are connected with the Arthurian cycle. The romance of Guillem de La Barra tells a strange story also found in Giovanni Boccaccio's The Decameron (2nd Day, viii.); it was finished in 1318, and is dedicated to a noble of Languedoc called Sicart de Montaut. Of these, only Jaufri is considered of any literary merit .

Connected with the romance of adventure is the novel (novas in Occitan), which is originally an account of an event newly happened. The novel must have been at first in the south what, as we see by the Decameron, it was in Italy, a society pastime with the wits in turn relating anecdotes, true or imaginary, which they think likely to amuse their auditors. But before long this kind of production was treated in verse, the form adopted being that of the romances of adventure octosyllabic verses rhyming in pairs. Some of those novels which have come down to us may be ranked with the most graceful works in Provençal literature; two are from the pen of the Catalan author Raimon Vidal de Besalu. One, the Castia-gilos (the Chastisement of the Jealous Man), is a treatment, not easily matched for elegance, of a frequently-handled theme the story of the husband who, in order to entrap his wife, takes the disguise of the lover whom she is expecting and receives with satisfaction blows intended, as he thinks, for him whose part he is playing; the other, The Judgment of Love, is the recital of a question of the law of love, departing considerably from the subjects usually treated in the novels. Mention may also be made of Las novas del papagay by Arnaut de Carcassès, in which the principal character is a parrot of great eloquence and ability, who succeeds marvellously in securing the success of the amorous enterprises of his master.

Novels came to be extended to the proportions of a long romance. Flamenca, which belongs to the novel type, has still over eight thousand verses, though the only MS. of it has lost some leaves both at the beginning and at the end. This poem, composed in all probability in 1234, is the story of a lady who by very ingenious devices, not unlike those employed in the Miles gloriosus of Plautus, succeeds in eluding the vigilance of her jealous husband. No analysis can be given here of a work the action of which is highly complicated; suffice it to remark that there is no book in medieval literature which betokens so much quickness of intellect and is so instructive in regard to the manners and usages of polite society in the 13th century. We know that novels were in great favor in the south of France, although the specimens preserved are not very numerous. Statements made by Francesco da Barberino (early part of the 14th century), and recently brought to light, give us a glimpse of several works of this class which have been lost. From the Occitan territories the novel spread into Catalonia, where we find in the 14th century a number of novels in verse very similar to the Provençal ones, and into Italy, where in general the prose form has been adopted.

== Didactic and religious poetry ==
Compositions intended for instruction, correction and edification were very numerous in the south of France as well as elsewhere, and, in spite of the enormous losses sustained by Provençal literature, much of this kind still remains. But it is seldom that such works have much originality or literary value. Originality was naturally absent, as the aim of the writers was mainly to bring the teachings contained in Latin works within the reach of lay hearers or readers. Literary value was not of course excluded by the lack of originality, but by an unfortunate chance the greater part of those who sought to instruct or edify, and attempted to substitute moral works for secular productions in favor with the people, were, with a few exceptions, persons of limited ability. It would be out of question to enumerate here all the didactic treatises, all the lives of saints, all the treatises of popular theology and morals, all the books of devotion, all the pious canticles, composed in Occitan verse during the Middle Ages; still some of these poems may be singled out.

Daude de Pradas (early 13th century), a canon of Maguelone, and at the same time a troubadour, has left a poem, the Auzels cassadors, which is one of the best sources for the study of falconry. Raimon d'Avignon, otherwise unknown, translated in verses, about the year 1200, Rogerius' Surgery (Romania, x. 63 and 496). There is also a poem on astrology by a certain C. (Guilhem?), and another, anonymous, on geomancy, both written about the end of the 13th century. The troubadour Raimon de Castelnou, active around 1274, wrote a treatise on doctrine and ethics, entitled Doctrinal.

As to moral compositions, we have to recall the Boethius poem (unfortunately a mere fragment) already mentioned as one of the oldest documents of the language, and really a remarkable work; and to notice an early (12th century?) metrical translation of the famous Disticha de moribus of Dionysius Cato (Romania, xxv. 98, and xxix. 445). More original are some compositions of an educational character known under the name of ensenhamenz, and, in some respects, comparable to the English nurture-books.

The most interesting are those of Garin le Brun (12th century), Arnaut de Mareuil, Arnaut Guilhem de Marsan, Amanieu de Sescas. Their general object is the education of ladies of rank. Of metrical lives of saints we possess about a dozen, written early in the 12th century; the Life of St Enimia (13th century), by Bertran of Marseilles, and that of St Honorat of Lerins by Raimon Feraud (about 1300), which is distinguished by variety and elegance of versification, but it is almost entirely a translation from Latin. Lives of saints (St Andrew, St Thomas the Apostle, St John the Evangelist) form a part of a poem, strictly didactic, which stands out by reason of its great extent (nearly thirty-five thousand verses) and the somewhat original conception of its scheme - the Breviars damor, a vast encyclopedia, on a theological basis, composed by the Minorite friar Matfre Ermengaut of Bezers between 1288 and 1300 or thereabout.

== Drama ==
Dramatic literature in Occitan consists of mysteries and miracle plays seldom exceeding two or three thousand lines, which never developed into the enormous dramas of northern France, whose acting required several consecutive days. Comic plays, so plentiful in medieval French literature (farces, sotties), do not seem to have found favor in the south. Specimens which we possess of Occitan drama are, comparatively few; but researches in local archives, especially in old account books, have brought to light a considerable number of entries concerning the acting, at public expense, of religious plays, called, in Latin documents, historia or moralitas, most of which seem to be irretrievably lost. The Sponsus, in both Latin and Occitan, is preserved from the mid-11th century and may have non-liturgical roots. It shows originality in both the treatment of its biblical theme and its musical accompaniment, since it was sung in its entirety. As all the Occitan plays, sometimes mere fragments, which have escaped destruction, are preserved in about a dozen manuscripts, unearthed within the last forty or fifty years. Generally those plays belong to the 15th century or to the sixteenth. Still, a few are more ancient and may be ascribed to the 14th century or even to the end of the thirteenth. The oldest appears to be the Mystery of St Agnes (edited by Bartsch, 1869), written in Arles. Somewhat more recent, but not later than the beginning of the 14th century, is a Passion of Christ (not yet printed) and a mystery of the Marriage of the Virgin, which is partly adapted from a French poem of the 13th century, (see Romania xvi. 71). A manuscript, discovered in private archives (printed by Alfred Jeanroy and Henri Teulié, 1893), contains not less than sixteen short mysteries, three founded on the Old Testament, thirteen on the New. They were, written in Rouergue and are partly imitated from French mysteries.

At Manosque (Alpes-de-Haute-Provence) was found a fragment of a Ludus sancts Jacobi inserted in a register of notarial deeds (printed by C. Arnaud) of some kind. In 1513 French poems were first admitted in the competitions, and under Louis XIV (from 1679) these were alone held eligible. This unfair arrangement, by which some of the leading poets of northern France profited, held good till 1893, when the town very properly transferred its patronage to a new Escolo moundino, but very soon restored its support to the older institution, on learning that Occitan poetry was again to be encouraged.

== From the sixteenth to the eighteenth century ==
In the two centuries that followed the medieval there was a succession of works, chiefly of a didactic and edifying character, which scarcely belong to the realm of literature proper, but at least served to keep alive some kind of literary tradition. This dreary interval was relieved by a number of religious mystery plays, which, though dull by modern tastes, probably gave keen enjoyment to the people, and represent a more popular genre; the latest that have been preserved may be placed between the years 1450 and 1515.

In the opinion of Hermann Oelsner ("Provençal Literature", Encyclopædia Britannica 11th ed., 1911) not only did the literature deteriorate during this period, but dialects took the place of the uniform literary language employed by the troubadours, while the spoken tongue yielded more and more to French. In 1539 François I, with the Ordinance of Villers-Cotterêts, forbade the use of Occitan in official documents a fact that is worthy of note only as being significant in itself, not as an important factor in the decadence of Provençal letters. At about this time, there are signs of a revival. In 1565 the Gascon, Pey de Garros, translated the Psalms into his dialect, and two years later published a volume of poems. His love for his native tongue is genuine, and his command over it considerable; he deplores its neglect, and urges others to follow his example. Auger Gaillard (c. 1530–1595) does infinitely less credit to his province: the popularity of his light pieces was probably due to their obscenity. More in the spirit of Garros is the charming trilingual Salut composed by the famous du Bartas in honor of a visit of Marguerite de Valois to Nérac (1579): three nymphs dispute as to whether she should be welcomed in Latin, French, or Gascon, and the last, of course, wins the day.

Provence proper gave birth to a poet of considerable importance in Louis Bellaud de la Bellaudire (1532–1588), of Grasse, who, after studying at Aix, enlisted in the royal armies, and was made a prisoner at Moulins in 1572. During his captivity he wrote poems inspired by real love of liberty and of his native country (Don-Don internal, 1584 or 1585). At Aix Bellaud subsequently became the centre of a literary circle which included most of the local celebrities; all of these paid their tribute to the poets memory in the edition of his works published by his uncle, Pierre Paul, himself the author of pieces of small value, included in the same volume (Lous Passatens, obros et rimos ..., Marseilles, 1595). Oelsner states that even when Bellaud is wholly frivolous, and intent on worldly pleasures only, his work has interest as reflecting the merry, careless life of the time.

A writer very popular in Provence for the light-hearted productions of his youth was Claude Brueys (1570–1650), remarkable chiefly for comedies that deal largely with duped husbands (Jardin deys musos provensalos, not published till 1628). Oelsner states that there is a certain charm, too, in the comedies of Claude's disciple, Gaspard Zerbin (La Perlo deys niusos et coumedies prouvensalos, 1655); and those critics who have read the plays of Joan de Cabanas (1653–1712) and of Seguin (of Tarascon, c. 1640), still in manuscript in 1911, speak highly of them.

The most consistently popular form of poetry in the south of France was always the novel. There has been no limit to the production of these; but very rarely does the author deserve special mention. An exception must be made in the case of Nicolas Saboly (1614–1675), who in the opinion of Oelsner produced the best pieces of this class, both as regards beauty of language and the devotion they breathe. They have deservedly maintained their popularity to the present day. In Languedoc four poets have been cited as the best of the age Goudelin, Michel, LeSage and Bonnet.

Oelsner states that this is certainly so in the case of Pierre Goudelin (Goudouli, 1579–1649), of Toulouse, the most distinguished name in Occitan literature between the period of the troubadours and that of Jasmin. He had a good classical education, traces of which appear in all his poetry, his language and his manner being always admirable, even where his matter is lacking in depth. He is often called the Malherbe of the South, but resembles that writer only in form: his poetry, taken as a whole, has far more sap. Goudelin essayed and was successful in almost every short genre (Lou Ramelet Moundi, 1617, republished with additions till 1678), the piece of his which is most generally admired being the stanzas to Henry IV of France, though others will prefer him in his gayer moods. He enjoyed enormous popularity (extending to Spain and Italy), but never prostituted his art to cheap effects. His influence, especially but not exclusively in the Occitan area, has been deep and lasting. The fame of Jean Michel, of Nîmes, rests on the Embarras de la foire de Beaucaire, a poem of astonishing vigour, but deficient in taste. Daniel Sage, of Montpellier (Las Foulies, 1650), was a man of loose morals, which are reflected in nearly all his works: his moments of genuine inspiration from other causes are rare. More worthy of being bracketed with Goudelin is Bonnet, author of the best among the open air plays that were annually performed at Béziers on Ascension Day: a number of these (dated 1616–1657) were subsequently collected, but none can compare with the opening one, Bonnet's Jugement de Paris.

Another poet is Nicolas Fizes, of Frontignan, whose play, the Opéra de Frontignan (1670), dealing with a slight love intrigue, and an idyllic poem on the fountain of Frontignan, show a real poetic gift. A number of Toulouse poets, mostly laureats of the Academy, may be termed followers of Goudelin: of these François Boudet deserves mention, who composed an ode, Le Trinfe del Moundi (1678), in honor of his native dialect.

The classical revival about this time is also generally ascribed to Goudelin's influence. Its best known representative was Jean de Vales, of Montech, who made excellent translations from Virgil and Persius, and wrote a brilliant burlesque of the former in the manner of Scarron (Virgile deguisat, 1648; only four books published). He also composed a pastoral idyll, which, though too long and inclined to obscenity, contains much tender description. The greatest of the pastoral poets was Frariois de Cortete (1571–1655), of Prades, whose comedies, Ramounet and Mircimoundo (published, unfortunately with alterations, by his son in 1684), are written with such true feeling and in so pure a style that they can be read with real pleasure. A comedy of his dealing with Sancho Panza in the palace of the Duke has been edited.

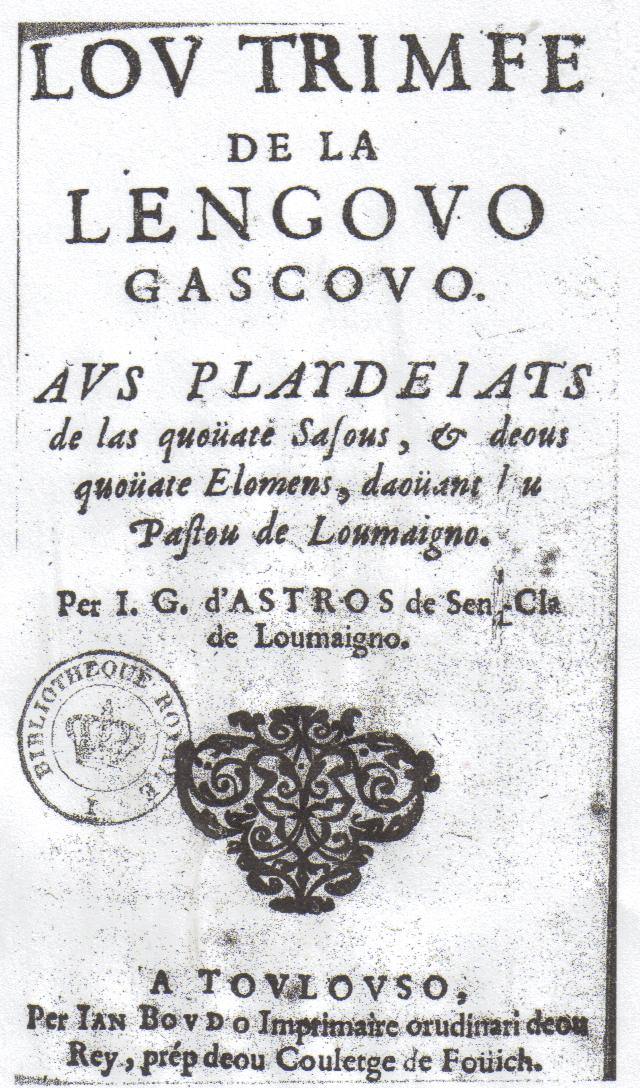
Cover of an edition of Lou Trimfe de la Lengouo Gascouo by Joan Giraud d'Astròs.

Armand Daubasse (1664–1727), of Quercy, who belonged to the working classes was very polular; he was patronized by the nobility in exchange for panegyrics. Gascony produced two typical works in the 17th century: Aders Genthomme gascoun (1610) and D'Astròs's Trinfe de la langue gascoune (1642). The former depicts a regular boasting Gascon who distinguishes himself in everything; while the latter is a plea in favor of the Gascon tongue, inspired by a genuine love of country. Gabriel Bedout (Parterre gascoun, 1642) is chiefly noted for his amorous solitari, called forth by the sufferings he endured from a hardhearted mistress. Louis Baron (1612–1662), living peacefully in his native village of Pouy-Loubrin, celebrated it with great tenderness.

In the 18th century the number of authors is much larger. The priests are mainly responsible for the literary output of Languedoc. Claude Peyrot (1709–1795) one of them, celebrates his county with true rural spirit in the Printenzps rouergat and Quartre sosous. But the chief of the band is Jean-Baptiste Fabre (1727–1783), the prior of Celleneuve, whose Sermoun de moussu sistre, delivered by a drunken priest against intemperance, is a masterpiece. He also wrote a successful mock-heroic poem (Siege de Caderousse) travesties of Homer and Virgil, a prose novel depicting the country manners of the time (Histoire de Jean lont pris), and two comedies, which likewise give a vivid picture of the village life he knew so well.

In the opinion of Oelsner the two genuine poets are the brothers Rigaud of Montpellier: Augustes (1760–1835) description of a vintage is deservedly famous; and Cyrille (1750—1820s) produced an equally delightful poem in the Amours de Mounpeïé. Pierre Hellies of Toulouse (d. 1724) a poet of the people, whose vicious life finds an echo in his works, has a certain rude charm, at times distantly recalling Villon. In the Province François Toussaint Gros (1698–1748), of Lyon, holds, in the view of Oelsner, undisputed sway. Oelsner states that his style and language are admirable, but unfortunately he wasted his gifts largely on trivial pieces d'occasion. Coye's 1711–1777) comedy, the Fiaucé paré, is bright and still popular, while Germain's description of a visit paid by the ancient gods to Marseille (La Bourrido del Dious, 1760) has considerable humour; and that in Gascony the greatest poet was Cyprien Despourrins (1698–1755), whose pastoral idylls and mournful chansons, which he himself set to music, are imbued with tenderness and charm.

The French Revolution produced a large body of literature, but nothing of lasting interest. However, it gave an impetus to thought in the Occitan area, as elsewhere; and there, as elsewhere, it called forth a spirit of independence that was all in favor of a literary revival. Scholars of the stamp of Raynouard (1761–1863), of Aix, occupied themselves with the brilliant literary traditions of the Middle Ages; newspapers sprang up (the Provençal Bouil-Abaisso, started by Joseph Desanat, and the bilingual Lou Tambourin et le ménestrel, edited by Bellot, both in 1842); poets banded together and collected their pieces in volume form (thus, the nine troubaire who published Lou Bouquet prouvençaou in 1823).

== Félibrige ==
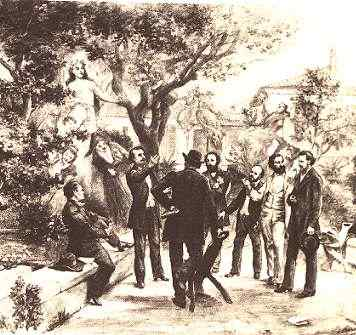
Meeting of the Félibres in 1854

Much has been written about the precurseurs de Félibrige, and critics are sorely at variance as to the writers that most deserve this appellation. We shall not go far wrong if we include in the list Hyacinthe Morel (1756–1829), of Avignon, whose collection of poems, Lou Saboulet, has been republished by Frédéric Mistral; Louis Aubanel (178~-1842), of Nîmes, the successful translator of Anacreon's Odes; Auguste Tandon, the troubadour of Montpellier, who wrote Fables, contes et autres pièces en vers (1800); Fabre d'Olivet, the versatile littérateur who in 1803 published Le Troubadour: Poésies occitaniques, which, in order to secure their success, he gave out as the work of some medieval poet Diou-loufet (1771–1840), who wrote a didactic poem, in the manner of Virgil, relating to silkworm-breeding (Leis magnans); Jacques Azais (1778–1856), author of satires, fables, etc.; d'Astros (1780–1863), a writer of fables in La Fontaine's manner; Castil-Blaze, who found time, amidst his musical pursuits, to compose Provençal poems, intended to be set to music; the Marquis de la Fare-Alais (1791–1846), author of some light satirical tales (Las Castagnados).

While these writers were all more or less academic, and appealed to the cultured few, four poets of the people addressed a far wider public: Verdi (1779–1820), of Bordeaux, who wrote comic and satirical pieces; Jean Reboul (1796–1864), the baker of Nîmes, who never surpassed his first effort, L'Ange et l'enfant (1828); Victor Gelu (1806–1885), relentless and brutal, but undeniably powerful of his kind (Fenian é Grouman; dix chansons provençales, 1840); and the acknowledged forerunner of the felibres, Jacques Jasmin, whose poems, both lyrical and narrative, continue to find favour with men of the highest culture and literary attainments, as with the villagers for whom they were primarily intended.

While much of this literature was still in the making, an event took place which was destined to eclipse in importance any that had gone before. In 1845 Joseph Roumanille of Saint-Rémy (Bouches-du-Rhône), became usher in a small school at Avignon, which was attended by Frédéric Mistral, a native of the same district, then fifteen years of age. The former, feeling the germs of poetry within him, had composed some pieces in French; but, finding that his old mother could not understand them, he was greatly distressed, and determined thenceforth to write in his native dialect only. These poems revealed a new world to young Mistral, and spurred him on to the resolve that became the one purpose of his life "de remettre en lumière et conscience de sa gloire cette noble race que Mirabeau nomme encore la nation provençale".

Mistral's personality and works are certainly better known than his fellows'. Still, in studying the Provençal renaissance, Roumanille's great claims should not be overlooked, and they have never been put forward with more force than by Mistral himself (in the preface to his Isclos doro). Roumanille's secular verse cannot fail to appeal to every lover of pure and sincere poetry (Li Margarideto, 1836–1847; Li Sounjarello, 1852; Li Flour de Sauvi, 1850, 1859, etc.), his novels are second only to those of Saboly, his prose works (such as Lou mege de Cucugnan, 1863) sparkling with delightful humour. He it was who in 1852 collected and published Li Prouvençalo, an anthology in which all the names yet to become famous, and most of those famous already (such as Jasmin), are represented. In 1853 he was one of the enthusiastic circle that had gathered round J.B. Gaut at Aix, and whose literary output is contained in the Roumavagi dei Troubaire and in the short lived journal Lou gay saber (1854).

At the same time the first attempt at regulating the orthography of Provençal was made by him (in the introduction to his play, La Part dou bon Dieu, 1853). And in 1854 he was one of the seven poets who, on May 21, foregathered at the castle of Fontsgugne, near Avignon, and founded the Félibrige. The etymology of this word has given rise to much speculation: the one thing certain about the word is that Mistral came across it in an old Provençal poem, which tells how the Virgin meets Jesus in the Temple, among the seven felibres of the law. The outlines of the constitution, as finally settled in 1876, are as follows. The region of the Felibrige is divided into four mantenenço (Provence, Languedoc, Aquitaine and Catalonia). At the head of all is a consistori of fifty (called majourau), presided over by the Capoulié, who is chief of the entire Felibrige. The head of each mantenenço is called sendi (who is at the same time a majourau); and at the head of each school (as the subdivisions of the mantenenço are called) is a cabiscòu. The ordinary members, unlimited in number, are mantenèire. Annual meetings and fetes are organized. The most widely read of the Felibrige publications is the Armana prouvençau, which has appeared annually since, maintaining all the while its original scope and purpose; and though unpretentious in form, it contains much of the best work of the school. The other six were Mistral, Théodore Aubanel, Anselme Mathieu (a school fellow of Mistral's at Avignon), E. Garcin, Alphonse Tavan and Paul Giéra (owner of the castle). Of these, Théodore Aubanel has alone proved himself worthy to rank with Mistral and Roumanille.

Zani, the girl of his youthful and passionate love, took the veil; and this event is said to have inspired his poetry in La miougrano entre-duberto 1860 and Li Fiho d'Avignoun, 1883). Some critics say he is the deepest among the felibres, and his lyrics are found poignant. His verses describe physical beauty in woman, and convey suppressed passion, but never express directly sensuality. His love drama Lou pau dou peccat was well received in Montpellier in 1878, and produced (some years later in Arnes version) by Antoine at his Theatre Libreno. It is the only play that the school has yet produced. The fourth of the group of poets alone, amidst the numerous writers of lyrics and other works that attain a high level of excellence appear to have so far secured permanent fame.

Felix Gras settled at Avignon in his youth. He completed an epic, Li Carbounié in 1876. The heroic geste of Toloza (1882), in which Simon de Montfort's invasion of the south is depicted intensely. Lou Roumancero prouvençau (1887) is a collection of poems instinct with Provençal lore, and in Li Papalino (1891) there are prose tales that recall the Avignon of the popes. Finally, the poet gave us three tales dealing with the period of the Revolution (Li Rouge dóu miejour, etc.); their realism and literary art called forth general admiration.

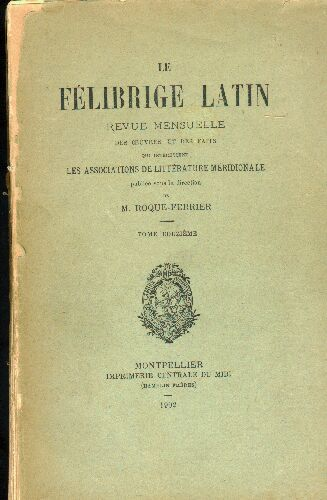
Félibrige Latin

While Mistral and many of the best felibres employ the dialect of the Bouches-du-Rhône, others, who have since seceded as the Félibrige Latin (headed by Roque-Ferrier), prefer to use the dialect of Montpellier, owing to its central position. A third class favors the dialect of Limousin, considering it has been used by the troubadours. Nearly all the leaders of the Felibrige are Legitimists and Catholics.

There are exceptions, however, chief among them the Protestant Gras, whose Toloza clearly reflects his sympathy with the Albigenses. Yet this did not stand in the way of his election as Capoulié proof, if proof were needed, that literary merit outweighs all other considerations in this artistic body of men. Finally, it may be noted that the felibres have often been accused of lack of patriotism towards northern France, of schemes of decentralization, and other heresies; but none of these charges holds good. The spirit of the movement, as represented by its leaders, has never been expressed with greater terseness, force and truth than in the three verses set by Felix Gras at the head of his Carbounié: "I love my village more than thy village; I love my Provence more than thy province; I love France more than all".

== Late twentieth and twenty-first century ==
Despite two hundred years of suppression by successive French centralist governments and the official prohibition of the language at school, in the administration and in the media, Occitan and Occitania have never ceased to inspire poets and authors. Article II of the French Constitution excludes government recognition of Occitan, among other languages of France, which has served as a pretext for the formal and informal campaigns of discrimination known in Occitan as la Vergonha, "the shame". Nonetheless, modern writers across every region of Occitania have influenced the development of the language: Joan Bodon in Guyenne, Marcela Delpastre in Limousin, Robèrt Lafont in Provence, Bernat Manciet in Gascony and Max Roqueta in Languedoc.

All genres of modern international literature are present in Occitan, especially since the second half of the 20th century, although some avant-garde Occitan literature already existed from the late 19th century.

== See also ==
- Association internationale d'études occitanes
- Category:Occitan poets
- List of troubadours and trobairitz
- Cantiga de amigo
- Jacques Jasmin
- Medieval music
- French Medieval literature
