= Rigaud =

Rigaud may refer to:

== People ==
- Cyrille Rigaud (1750–1824), French poet from Occitania
- Auguste Rigaud (1760–1835), French poet
- André Rigaud (1761–1811), Haitian revolutionary
- Clément Rigaud (born 1984), French football player
- Émile Rigaud (1824–1890), French lawyer and politician
- François-Pierre Rigaud de Vaudreuil (1703–1779), Governor of Montreal, New France (now Canada)
- Gaspard Rigaud (1661–1705), French painter
- George Rigaud (1905–1984), Argentine film actor
- Hyacinthe Rigaud (1659–1743), French baroque portrait painter
- Jean Rigaud (1912–1999), French painter
- John Francis Rigaud (1742–1810), French/Italian painter
- Joseph Hyacinthe François de Paule de Rigaud, Comte de Vaudreuil (1740–1817), French nobleman
- Louis-Philippe de Rigaud de Vaudreuil (1691–1763), French naval officer
- Philippe de Rigaud Vaudreuil (c. 1643–1725), Governor-general of New France (now Canada)
- Pierre de Rigaud, Marquis de Vaudreuil-Cavagnial (1698–1778), Canadian-born French Governor-general of New France (now Canada)
- Stephen Francis Dutilh Rigaud (1777–1861), English painter
- Stephen Peter Rigaud (1774–1839), English mathematical historian and astronomer
- Stephen Rigaud (1816–1859), English clergyman and schoolmaster
- Odette Mennesson-Rigaud (1907–1990), French and Haitian ethnographer
- Rigaud of Assier (died 1323), Bishop of Winchester, England

== Places ==
- Rigaud, Alpes-Maritimes, a commune in the Alpes-Maritimes département of France
- Rigaud, Quebec, a municipality west of Montreal, Canada
- Rigaud River, river in Ontario and Quebec, Canada
- Ski Mont Rigaud, ski area in Quebec, Canada

== Other ==
- Rigaud, Pons & Compagnie, French bookselling firm in the 18th century
