= Hugh III of Rodez =

Hugh III (died 1196), of the House of Millau, was briefly Count of Rodez in association with his father, Hugh II, from 1195 to his death a year later. He was also the viscount of Bénavent.

In 1178 Hugh married Adelaide de La Garde de Vallon. He was associated with his father in May 1195, when his father was already an old man. He only survived a year and was replaced as co-count by his younger brother William. At his death his own sons—Bernard, John, Hugh, and Richard—were too young to inherit. In 1230 Hugh eventually succeeded to Bénavent and Richard to the viscounty of Carlat.
