= Arlabecca =

Start of the anonymous Dieus vos salve trastotz essems in troubadour chansonnier Z. The word arlabeca appears at the end of line 4.

The arlabecca (Old Occitan: [aɾlaˈbɛka]) was a genre of Old Occitan lyric poetry. First mentioned in an ensenhamen by Peire Lunel, the genre was supposed by François Raynouard to be a lament or dirge, and Emil Levy thought it a "kind of poetry". It may derive from the Galician-Portuguese term for a rebec, arrabecca. The term rebec (plural rebecz) can be found in Old Occitan references to both an instrument and a genre (as in the Leys d'amors, where it is undefined). Possibly the rebec is the same genre as the arlabecca. Lunel defined his arlabecca by its metre, and thus his ensenhamen was an arlabecca as well.

== Sources ==
- Frank M. Chambers. An Introduction to Old Provençal Versification. DIANE Publishing, 1985. See pp. 256–7.
