= Peire Pelet =

Peire Pelet (died 1303) was the conseigneur of Alès in the Languedoc. He was married to Delfina (Delphine), a sister of Henry II of Rodez. He is the senher d'Alest (the lord of Alès) referred to as a participant in the torneyamen "Senhe n'Enric, us reys un ric avar" along with his brother-in-law Henry and the troubadour Guiraut Riquier.

Peire was descended from a Raymond Pelet who took part in the First Crusade. His father was Bernard Pelet, who died in September 1252, leaving his entire heritage to his eldest son, William, under the tutelage of Bernard de Barre, Guillaume de Pontils, and Jean de Bossoles. In 1253 William, with his tutors and his younger brothers, including Peire, received the homage of their father's vassals: Hugues de Melet, Pierre de Spinasson, and many others, in the presence of Pierre Gaucelin, Bérenger de la Fare, Arnaud d'Arsac, and Pierre Gaucelin de Follaquier. On the death of William without heirs Peire succeeded him. He married Delfina sometime before April 1276, when her brother released a sum of money left her by their father, Henry I: a hundred marks of silver or 5,000 sols tournois.

In 1274 James I of Aragon renounced the homage and oath of fealty owed by Peire for his fief since his great-great-grandfather, Bertrand Pelet, Count of Melgueil, had rendered it to James's grandfather, Alfonso II. Peire then began a war with Bérenger Frédol, Bishop of Maguelonne, over the county of Melgueil, which at that time was held by the bishop from the Papacy. In 1276 the combatants were brought before the episcopal court of the Archdiocese of Narbonne. Peire lost the case and was ordered to pay 1,000 livres in compensation.

Joseph Angalde placed the aforementioned torneyamen around 1280–1, before the death of Peire, which he believed occurred in 1282; after the return of Riquier from Castile in 1279; and after the succession of Henry, who he believed was referred to as coms (count) in the torneyamen, in 1274. This dating has been revised in light of Anglade's errors (Peire died in 1303 and Henry is referred to only as senher, lord). Since all three debaters call on the adjudication of the coms d'Astarac, probably Bernard IV, it seems probable that the torneyamen dates to 1281–4, the period during which Riquier is known to have addressed several songs to the count of Astarac.
