= Henry I of Rodez =

Henry I (c. 1175 – c. 1222), of the house of Millau, was the Count of Rodez and Viscount of Carlat from 1208 until his death. He was the son and successor of Hugh II. His mother was Bertrande d'Amalon.

In 1212, he married Algayette, heiress of Guy, lord of Scorailles. She gave birth to his eventual successor, Hugh IV, and also a daughter, Guida, who married the troubadour Pons de Monlaur.

On 18 October 1221, Henry composed his will in the presence of the Magisters Bertrandus and Petrus Maurinus while he was in ill at the house of the Knights Hospitaller. He is thought to have possibly died in 1222.

Preceded by Hugh II	Count of Rodez; 1208–1221	Succeeded by Hugh IV
