= Raimon de Castelnou =

Writer and troubadour

The large decorated or historiated initial from the start of Raimon's poems in chansonnier C has been cut out. On the right is the lesser decorated initial of the poem De servir a bon senhor.

Raimon de Castelnou was an Occitan writer and troubadour of the second half of the 13th century. He wrote five cansos (love songs) and one treatise on Catholic doctrine and ethics. There is a sirventes attributed to him in some manuscripts, but its attribution is disputed.

Raimon's treatise, the Doctrinal, contains 400 lines divided into 14 rhymed laisses. It was transmitted independently of his lyric poetry and is found in two manuscripts: British Museum, Harley 7403 and Biblioteca Medicea Laurenziana, Ashburnham 40b. In it, Raimon describes himself as a poor knight who gave up "worthless singing" under the influence of some good clergymen. The Doctrinal is mostly about the sacraments, but also ethics. It was intended for a popular audience and for public recitation.

The authenticity of the attribution of the sirventes to Raimon is argued by Vicenç Beltrán. It is found in three chansonniers, but in three others it is attributed to Peire Cardenal. It may be a contrafactum by Raimon of an original by Peire, De selhs qu'avets el sirventes dich mal. Beltrán proposes that Raimon composed it around 1274–1275, when Alfonso X of Castile traveled to Beaucaire to meet Pope Gregory X, who dissuaded him from pursuing his claim on the Holy Roman Empire. From the authenticity of this sirventes, it follows that Raimon's patrons were Counts Hugh IV and Henry II of Rodez.

== Works ==
- The cansos are all found in chansonnier C. Although each is attributed to R. de Castelnou, the table of contents mistakenly gives his name as Ymbert de Castelnou.
  - Ar a ben dos ans passatz
  - Aras, puc ai luec e sazo
  - De servir a bon senhor
  - Entr'ir'et alegrier m'estau
  - Ges, si tot es tan suau
- The sirventes is attributed to Raimon in chansonniers C, R and a^{1}; to Peire explicitly in D^{b} and M and implicitly in T; to Daipol (perhaps Guilhem d'Autpol) in f; and is anonymous in Y.
  - Mon chantar voill retrair'al cominal
- Doctrinal, the incipit of which is E.nom de Dieu lo Paire e de la Trinitat

== Editions ==
- Giannetti, Andrea, ed. Raimon de Castelnou: Canzoni e dottrinale. Biblioteca di filologia romanza, 33. Bari: Adriatica, 1988.
