= Peire Lunel de Montech =

Peire Lunel de Montech (fl. 1326–1384), also known as Cavalier Lunel or Peire de Lunel, was a lawyer, politician and author of Toulouse. His name indicates he was a knight (cavalier in Occitan) from Montech.

In his youth he was a troubadour. A canso, a Crusading song, a sirventes, an ensenhamen and some moralising coblas esparsas survive of his work. The Crusading song is dated to around 1326. It is a critique of King Charles IV for promising a Crusade and doing nothing. Lunel's sirventes, was written at the height of the Black Death in 1348.

In 1326 Lunel composed the Ensenhamen del garso ("instruction of the boy"), the latest surviving ensenhamen. Written in arlabecca form, it is modeled on the Ensenhamen del escudier of Amanieu de Sescars. The boy (garso) for whom Lunel composed it was an aspiring poet looking for advice on how to compose. Lunel's advice is an important source for understanding the troubadours' own conception of the ensenhamen genre.

Lunel was recorded as a doctor en leys (doctor of laws) in the register of the members of the Toulouse Consistory in 1355, the first year for which we have records. In 1384 Lunel was a municipal official in Montauban.

== Sources ==
- Jeanroy, Alfred (1934). La poésie lyrique des troubadours. Toulouse: Privat.
- Paterson, Linda (2003). "Lyric allusions to the crusades and the Holy Land."Colston Symposium.
- Ricketts, Peter T., ed. "Cavalier Lunel de Monteg (alias Peire de Lunel)."
