= Bertran Carbonel =

Bertran Carbonel (fl. 1252–1265) was a Provençal troubadour from Marseille. He is a polarising figure among scholars and his reputation varies between authorities. Eighteen of his lyric works survive, as well as seventy-two (Gaunt and Kay) or ninety-four (Riquer) single coblas triadas esparsas on "edifying" themes. He was patronised at the court of Hugh IV and Henry II of Rodez.

There were many individuals of Bertran's name in Marseille in his time, so identifying the troubadour among them has been impossible. Bertran's poetry is among the earliest Occitan literature to be written as literature, or, in contemporary Latin, juxta propria principia. He was also educated, as his references to Ovid, Terence, and other Classical figures reveals.

Bertran was a devotee of the minor(-sounding) style of Peire Cardenal, whom he imitated in tone. His moralising is, however, as advice, generally mediocre and unexciting. His cansos—for he wrote mostly those and sirventes—are "tedious and unoriginal". His sirventes by the name of Tans ricx clergues vey trasgitar is an attack on false clerics. But only in the canso Atressi fay gran foldat qui ab sen does Bertran betray real emotion. Drawing, evidently, from a personal experience, the troubadour laments his foolishness and his lack of judgement in kissing a girl on the eyes who had fallen asleep before the altar in a church. He offers apology to the girl and God.

Besides his cansos and sirventes, Bertran left behind one planh and two artificial tensos, one with a fictional knight and another with his own heart.

== Sources ==
- Gaunt, Simon, and Kay, Sarah. "Appendix I: Major Troubadours" (pp. 279–291). The Troubadours: An Introduction. Simon Gaunt and Sarah Kay, edd. Cambridge: Cambridge University Press, 1999. ISBN 0-521-57473-0.
- Riquer, Martín de. Los trovadores: historia literaria y textos. 3 vol. Barcelona: Planeta, 1975.
- Jeanroy, Alfred (Ed.). Les coblas de Bertran Carbonel publiées d'après tous les manuscrits connus Annales du Midi 25 (1913), 137-88
- Contini, G. (Ed.). Sept poésies lyriques du troubadour Bertran Carbonel de Marseille Annales du Midi 49 (1937), 5-41, 113-152, et 225-240
