= Tomida femina =

Earliest surviving poem in Occitan

Tomida femina (Occitan: [tuˈmiðɔ ˈfeminɔ], Catalan: [tuˈmiðə ˈfɛminə]; "A swollen woman") is the earliest surviving poem in Occitan, a sixteen-line charm probably for the use of midwives. It is preserved in the left and bottom margins of a Latin legal treatise in a ninth- or tenth-century manuscript, where it is written upside down. Line 14 is missing, but has been supplied by the editors on the basis of the pattern of the final three lines. It has been edited and translated into English by William Doremus Paden and Frances Freeman Paden:

Tomida femina in tomida via sedea; tomid infant in falda sua tenea; tomides mans et tomidas pes, tomidas carnes que est colbe recebrunt; tomide fust et tomides fer que istæ colbe doner unt. Exsunt en dolores d'os en polpa [de polpa en curi] de curi in pel de pel in erpa. Terra madre susipiat dolores.	A swollen woman Sat in a swollen road; A swollen child She held in her lap; Swollen hand And swollen feet, Swollen flesh That will take this blow; Swollen wood And swollen iron That will give this blow. The pain goes out From bone to flesh, From flesh to skin, From skin to hair, From hair to grass; Let mother earth receive the pain.

The meaning of the poetic charm, a "talking cure", is uncertain. Possibly it is intended as a cure for an edema. The swollen woman of line 1 and the swollen child of line 3 may both be patients, or perhaps only one of them. The charm transfers the swelling from the patient to wood and iron, possibly referring to medical instruments, and thence to the earth. On the other hand, the swollen woman and child "held in her lap" may refer to a pregnancy. The chanter may be the midwife. The poem's editors note the fittingness of an image of birth at the beginning of Occitan literature.

== Sources ==
- W. D. Paden and F. F. Paden. 2007. Troubadour Poems from the South of France. Cambridge: D. S. Brewer, pp. 14–16.
