= Cyrille Rigaud =

French librarian and poet (1750–1824)

Jean-Cyrille Rigaud
- Born: 28 January 1750; Montpellier, Languedoc, France
- Died: 29 January 1824 (aged 74); Occitania, France
- Occupation: Poet

Jean-Cyrille Rigaud (28 January 1750 – 29 January 1824) was a French poet, playwright and medical doctor from Occitania.

Rigaud was born in Montpellier thrn in Languedoc. Raised by his father, who was a librarian, he studied in Geneva. In his youth, he won a prize awarded by the Académie des Jeux floraux.

== Publications ==
- Éloge de Roucher, Montpellier, 1807, in-8°.
- Épître à MM. les étudiants en médecine de la Faculté de Montpellier, Montpellier, de l'impr. de J. Martel le jeune, 1823, in-8°
- Pouesias patouesas, Mounpeïé, Renaud, 1806, in-18.
- Poésies diverses, with Auguste Rigaud, Montpellier, de l'impr. de C.-J. Tournel, 1821, in-12 de 138 (contains fables, several speeches, including the Éloge de Roucher, read at the Académie de Montpellier in 1813, and inserted in the collection of that Société.)
- Pouésias patouèsas de Cyrilla Rigaud émbé edouquas péças d'Augusta Rigaud et dé différens doutvrs, Mounpéïé, Renaud, 1821, in-12.

== Translations ==
- Mémoire pour servir à l'histoire de quelques insectes, connus sous les noms de termites, ou fourmis blanches : et accompagné de figures gravées en taille-douce by Henry Smeathman, Paris, De La Rochelle, 1786.

== Sources ==
- Achille Chéreau, Le Parnasse médical français ou, Dictionnaire des médecins-poètes de la France, anciens ou modernes, morts ou vivants, Paris, Adrien Delahaye, 1874, (p. 477-478)
- Camille Dreyfus, André Berthelot, La Grande encyclopédie : inventaire raisonné des sciences, des lettres et des arts, t.28, Paris, Lamirault et cie, 1886, (p. 674).
- Joseph-François Michaud, Louis-Gabriel Michaud, Biographie universelle, ancienne et moderne. Nouvelle édition, t.36, Paris, C. Desplaces, 1863, (p. 23-24).
- Joseph-Marie Quérard, La France littéraire ou dictionnaire bibliographique des savants, Paris, Firmin Didot père et fils, 1836, (p. 48).
