= Hugh IV of Rodez =

Hugh IV (Occitan: Uc) (c. 1212–1274), of the House of Millau, was the Count of Rodez and Viscount of Carlat and Creyssel from 1221 until his death. He was the son of Henry I of Rodez and Algayette of Scorailles.

In 1242 Hugh was in revolt against the King of France, Louis IX. Upon making peace he made a vow to go on Crusade. He redeemed his vow with the payment of a rather small sum of money towards Louis IX's Crusade in 1248.

Hugh IV was a patron of troubadours. Among the troubadours supported at his court were Guiraut Riquier, Folquet de Lunel, Cerverí de Girona, Raimon de Castelnou and Bertran Carbonel. It is possible that he is the coms de Rodes who is the dedicatee of three religious cansos by Folquet de Lunel: Dompna bona, bel'e plazens, Si quon la fuelh'el ramel, and Tant fin'amors totas horas m'afila. Scholarship, however, is divided over whether the intended count was Hugh, indicating that the songs are a product of Folquet's youth, or his son Henry, making them a product of his maturity.

== Marriages and children ==
He married Isabeau (died 1271), daughter of Raymond I of Roquefeuil, and had five children:

- Henry II (1236–1304), successor
- Peter
- Valpurge (Walperga), married William IV, lord of Châteauneuf-Randon and Randonnat (died 1305)
- Dauphine (Dalfina), married Peter I of Alais
- Alix (Alice), nun

== Sources ==
- Maier, Christopher T. (1994). Preaching the Crusades: Mendicant Friars and the Cross in the Thirteenth Century. Cambridge: Cambridge University Press. ISBN 0-521-45246-5.
- Riquer, Martín de (1975) Los trovadores: historia literaria y textos. 3 vol. Barcelona: Planeta.

Preceded by Henry I	Count of Rodez; 1221–1274	Succeeded by Henry II
