= Nicolas Fizes =

French professor of mathematics and hydrography

Nicolas Fizes (27 October 1648 in Frontignan – 1718) was a French professor of mathematics and hydrography, who lived during the reign of Louis XIV. He is especially known as the librettist who wrote L'Opéra de Frontignan (1678), a play in Occitan, dealing with a slight love intrigue, and an idyllic poem on the fountain of Frontignan.

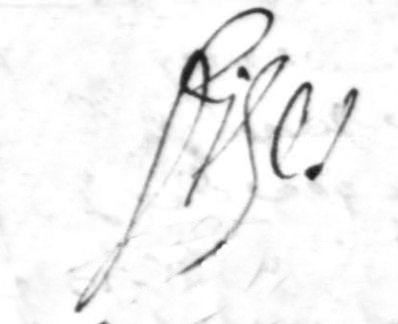
Signature in 1688 of Nicolas Fizes

== Career ==
Nicolas Fizes's parents were carpenters in the French Navy. He studied with the Jesuits, and became engineer to armies and a doctor of law. In 1682 he held the first professorship of mathematics and hydrography in Montpellier.

From 1689, he headed a school of hydrography in Frontignan. In the hall of the Town Hall, he taught a few young sailors the concepts of mathematics and astrology. But this school was previously free, and Fizes asked for a salary of 150 pounds a year, which led to a conflict with the consuls of Frontignan. The school only survived 7 years, and closed its doors in 1696.

== Bibliography ==
- Lucien Albagnac, Contribution à l'Histoire de Frontignan (no ISBN)
- André Cablat, René Michel, Maurice Nougaret, Jean Valette, La Petite Encyclopédie de Frontignan la Peyrade (no ISBN)

== See also ==
- Occitan literature
