= Pons de Monlaur =

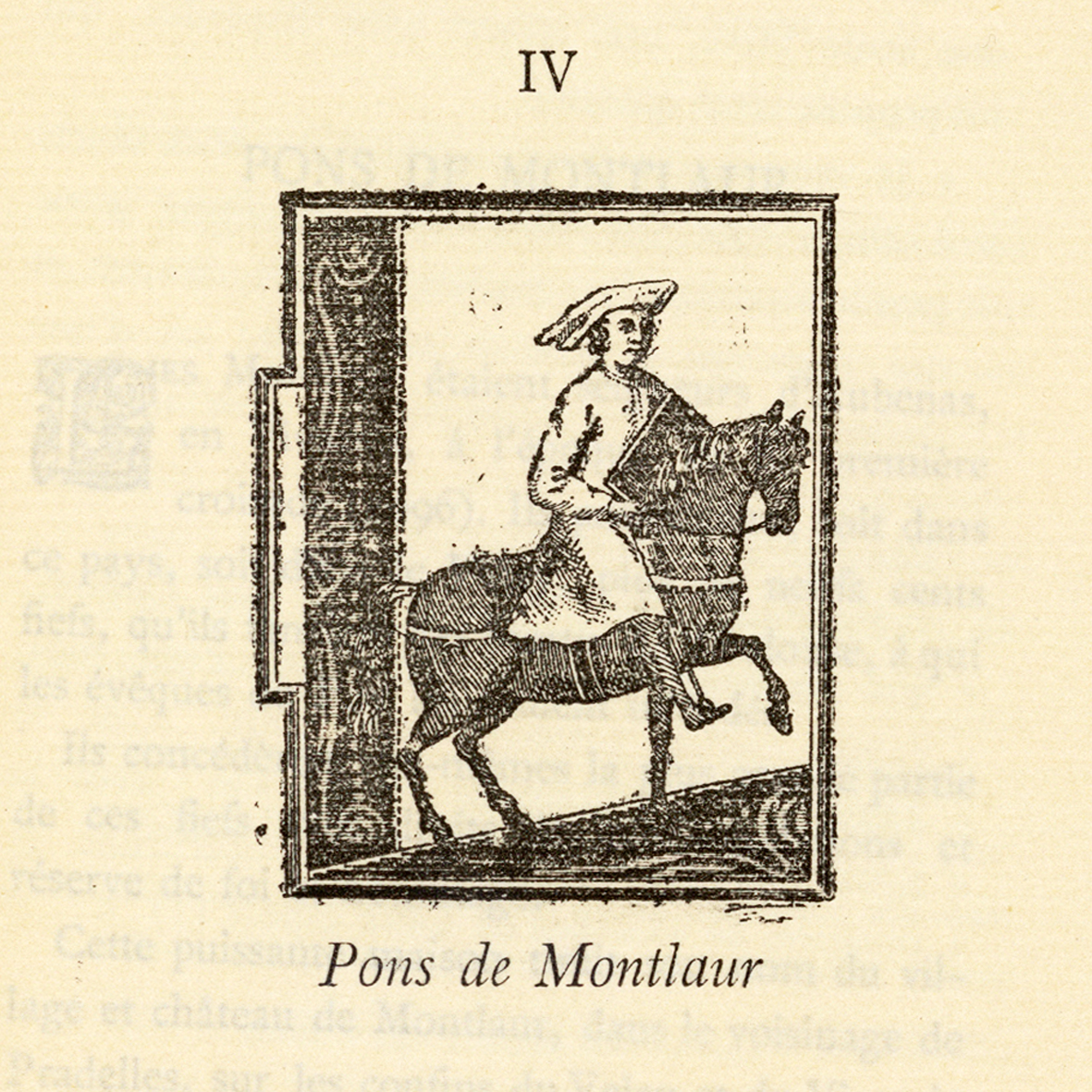

Pons de Monlaur or Montlaur was a Provençal baron and troubadour of the early thirteenth century. He was the lord of Montlaur-en-Diois and married Guida, sister of Hugh IV of Rodez, in 1235. Hugh was a patron of troubadours and Pons had a connexion through his wife also to Sordello, who addressed her in several poems under the senhals (epithets) N'Agradavit and Restaur. The French painter Adolphe Joseph Thomas Monticelli, during a stay in Montlaur, collected the local oral history and enjoyed retelling the legends of Pons de Montlaur.

Pons wrote "Qal preiatz mais.a ops d'amor", a partimen with a poet called "Esperdut", probably Gui de Cavaillon.

== Sources ==
- Jeanroy, Alfred (1934). La poésie lyrique des troubadours. Toulouse: Privat.
- Sordel: 437.24 at Rialto
