= Jacques Jasmin =

Occitan poet (1798–1864)

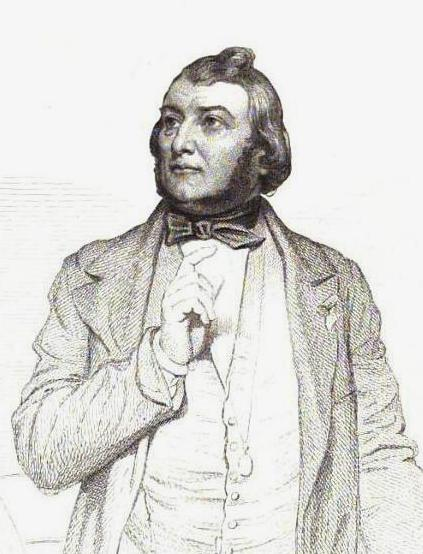
- Born: Jacques Boé; 16 March 1798
- Died: 4 October 1864 (aged 66)
- Writing career
- Pen name: Jansemin
- Language: Occitan
- Genre: poetry

Jansemin (born Jacques Boé and also known as Jasmin in French) (16 March 1798 – 4 October 1864) was an Occitan poet.

== Life ==
He was born at Agen, his family name being Boé. His father, who was a tailor, had a certain facility for making doggerel verses, which he sang or recited at fairs and other such gatherings; Jacques, who generally accompanied him, was thus early familiarized with the role of the poet. At 16, he found employment at a hairdresser's shop, and subsequently started a similar business of his own on the Gravier at Agen.

In 1825 he published his first volume of Papillotos (Curl Papers), containing poems in French (a language he used with a certain sense of restraint), and in the familiar Agen variety of the Occitan language, the popular speech of the working classes in which he was to achieve all his later literary triumphs. Jasmin was the most famous forerunner, in Provençal literature, of Frédéric Mistral and the Félibrige. His influence in rehabilitating, for literary purposes, his native dialect, was particularly exercised in the public recitals of his poems he gave. His poetic gift, as well as his fluent voice and fluid bearing, fitted him admirably for this double role of troubadour and jongleur. In 1835, he recited his "Blind Girl of Castel-Cuill" at Bordeaux, and in 1836 at Toulouse, and he met with an enthusiastic reception in both of these important cities. Most of his public recitations were given for benevolent purposes, the proceeds being contributed by him to the restoration of the church at Vergt and other good works.

Four successive volumes of Papillotos were published during his lifetime, and contained amongst others the following poems, quoted in order: "The Charivari", "My Recollections" (supplemented after an interval of many years), "The Blind Girl", "Francounetto", "Martha the Simple", and "The Twin Brothers".

Jansemin was not a prolific writer, and, in spite of his impetuous nature, would work a long time at one poem, striving to ensure he gave each feeling its most natural and lucid expression. A verse from his poem, "The Third of May", written in honour of Henry IV of France, and published in the first volume of Papillotos, is engraved on the base of the statue erected to that king at Nérac.

In 1852, Jansemin's works were crowned by the Académie Française, and a pension was awarded him. The medal struck on the occasion bore the inscription: Au poète moral et populaire. He received the title of Maistre es Jeu from the Academy of Toulouse; a distinction only conferred on illustrious writers. Pope Pius IX sent him the insignia of a knight of St Gregory the Great, and he was made chevalier of the Légion d'honneur.

He spent the latter years of his life on a small estate which he had bought near Agen and named Papillotos, and which he describes in "Ma Bigno" ("My Vine"). Though invited to represent his native city, he refused to do so, preferring the pleasures and leisure of a country life; wisely judging that he was no really eligible candidate for electoral honours. He died in 1864, and his last poem, an answer to Ernest Renan, was placed between his folded hands in his coffin.
