= Las, qu'i non sun sparvir, astur =

Incipit of an anonymous Old Occitan poem

Oh, to be a sparrow-hawk, a goshawk!
I'd fly to my love,
Touch her [la sintil], embrace her,
Kiss her lips so soft,
Sweeten and soothe our pain [dulur].

Las, qu'i non sun sparvir, astur (Occitan pronunciation: [ˈlas ki nu ˈsu spaɾˈβiɾ asˈtuɾ]), which translates "Oh, to be a sparrow-hawk, a goshawk!", is the incipit of an anonymous Old Occitan cobla (single stanza poem). It was found in the margins of an eleventh-century manuscript in the British Library. Possibly it was added late in that century, certainly by a German scribe. It was first published in 1984, and has been translated into French and English.

In the poem the lover expresses erotic desire and the longing for fulfillment through his wish to be a sparrow hawk or, which was more prized, a goshawk so that he could fly to her. In the Middle Ages, the value of a sparrow hawk was proportional to its resemblance to the goshawk in size, strength and beauty. The symbolism of the male lover as hunting bird reoccurs in the troubadour lyric and in the Middle High German Minnesang, beginning a century later. The apposition of joy (joi) and grief (dolor) would become a mainstay of the troubadours.

== Bibliography ==
- Pierre Bec. "Prétroubadouresque ou paratroubadouresque? Un antécédent médiéval d'un motif de chanson folklorique Si j'étais une hirondelle . . ." Cahiers de civilisation médiévale, 47 (2004):153–62.
- William D. Paden. "Before the Troubadours: The Archaic Occitan Texts and the Shape of Literary History." "De sens rassis": Essays in Honor of Rupert T. Pickens. Ed. by Keith Busby, Bernard Guidot, and Logan E. Whalen. Amsterdam: Rodopi, 2005, pp. 509–28.
- William D. Paden and Frances F. Paden. Troubadour Poems from the South of France. Cambridge: D. S. Brewer, 2007.
