= Hugh II of Rodez =

Hugh II (c. 1135 – 1208), of the House of Millau, was the Count of Rodez and Viscount of Carlat and Creyssels from around 1156 until his death. He was the son of Hugh I of Rodez and Carlat and Ermengard of Creyssels. Hugh was himself a vassal of the Counts of Toulouse.

In May 1195 Hugh associated his son Hugh III with him as count, but Hugh died the next year (1196). The elder Hugh, now an old man, appointed his fifth son, William, co-ruler in 1196. Hugh II and William made a donation to the abbey of Bonnecombe, the text of which, in Occitan, still survives. William predeceased his father in 1208 and Hugh II was succeeded by his only son by his second wife, Henry I.

Hugh had been a great patron of troubadours, most famously Uc Brunenc, who composed a planh (lament) on his death. Bernart de Venzac was also at his court from 1195 until 1208.

== Marriages and children ==
His first wife (1154) was Agnes, daughter of William VIII of Auvergne. She gave him six known children:

- Hugh III (died 1196), associate count
- Gilbert
- Renaud
- Bernard
- William (died 1208), associate count
- a daughter, married (1175) Guigues-Meschin du Tournel (1145–1200)

In 1172 Hugh remarried to Bertrande d'Amalon. They had two children:

- Henry I (1175–1221), successor
- Mary, married Astorg V d'Aurillac, lord of Tenières
