= Bernart de Tot-lo-mon =

Bernart de Tot-lo-mon was a troubadour and jongleur, probably active at the court of Count Henry II of Rodez (1274–1304). His nickname means "of all-the-world"; according to Alfred Jeanroy, he was probably from Bruniquel in the Quercy.

Three pieces by Bernart have survived. "Be m'agrada.l temps de pascor" is a cross between a canso d'amors and a sirventes. Its final stanza is a moral condemnation of worldly decadence, but the tone of the whole is unfailingly courtly. The text of this piece is poorly preserved, and the penultimate stanza is almost entirely lost. "Lo plazers qu'als plazens plai" is a plazer (or, according to István Frank, a sirventes). It is dedicated to Count Bernard VI of Comminges (r. 1241–1295) and Count Bernard III of Astarac (r. 1249–1291). "Mals fregz s'es els rics crois mes" is another sirventes with courtly characteristics. Its metre is borrowed from "Be volgra midons saubes" by Arnaut Plagues.
