= Las novas del papagay =

Old Occitan short story by Arnaut de Carcassès

Las novas del papagay ('Tale of the Parrot') is an Old Occitan short story in verse written by Arnaut de Carcassès around 1250. It is a humorous story similar to a fabliau.

In the Novas, the narrator overhears a parrot (papagay) wooing a married lady on behalf of the king's son, the knight Antiphanor. After winning her over, the parrot flies to the knight and brings him back to the garden. In one version, the parrot suggests that he set fire to the husband's castle to distract him while the lovers meet. This he does with Greek fire. In the garden, the lovers kiss and "took their solace". When the parrot warns of the husband's impending return (the fire having been put out), the knight swears a length oath of fidelity to his new lover in the spirit of fin'amor. He leaves with the parrot and the narrator warns husbands not to lock up their wives.

The Novas is preserved in five manuscripts: troubadour chansonniers R, J, G and D and the Florence, Biblioteca Riccardiana, 2756. R and J contain longer versions than the others, but they diverge after line 140. The whole poem is 245 lines in its shorter versions, as long as 312 lines in other witnesses.

Arnaut's authorship is attested in only a single manuscript. His surname indicates that he hailed from Carcassonne or its immediate vicinity or perhaps from Laroque-de-Fa.

== Bibliography ==
- Busby, Keith (1996). "The Occitan Fabliaux and the Linguistic Distribution of Genres". Neophilologus. 80 (1): 11–23. doi:10.1007/bf00430015.
- Kay, Sarah (2010). "The Monolingualism of the Parrot, or the Prosthesis of Origins, in Las novas del papagay". Romanic Review. 101 (1): 23–35. ProQuest 903974079
- Kay, Sarah (2013). Parrots and Nightingales: Troubadour Quotations and the Development of European Poetry. University of Pennsylvania Press.
- Langlois, Gauthier (2008). "Note sur les origines du troubadour Arnaut de Carcassés". Revue des langues romanes. 112 (1): 89–99.
- Németh, Linda (2016). "En quête de l'identité du perroquet dans la nouvelle occitane Las Novas del Papaguay d'Arnaut de Carcassès". In Adrián Bene; Rafael Ákos Szabó (eds.). Rencontres et conflits: Nouvelles perspectives en études romanes (PDF). University of Pécs. pp. 83–96.
- Pfeffer, Wendy, ed. (2022). Blandin de Cornoalha: A Comic Occitan Romance. Medieval Institute Publications.
