= Daude de Pradas =

Daude in a decorated initial in chansonnier A

Daude, Deude, Daurde, or Daudé de Pradas (fl. 1214–1282) was a troubadour from Prades-Salars in the Rouergue not far from Rodez. He lived to an old age and left behind seventeen to nineteen cansos, including twelve on courtly love, three about sexual conquest, one tenso, one planh (on the death of Uc Brunenc), and a religious song. Only one melody of his entire oeuvre has survived.

According to his vida, he was a canon of Maguelonne. A canon and magister of the name Deodatus de Pradas or Pratis appears in many documents from Rodez in the same time period. Some scholars believe it is not likely that Daude was a canon at all, while some presume him to have been a canon, not at Maguelonne, but Santa Maria in Rodez. Daude is often found in the company of the Counts and Bishops of Rodez and was named vicar general of Rodez by Pope Clement IV (1266).

According to his vida, Daude was reputed as a "wise man in letters, with natural wit and invention", but because he was not inspired by love, his songs were not popular and consequently not sung. Daude also possessed a keen knowledge of raptors, and wrote a treatise on falconry entitled Auzels Cassadors. He also stepped outside of the troubadour lyric to write a didactic poem (ensenhamen) on the four cardinal virtues.

Daude, in his love songs, expresses amor for a lady of higher rank in hope that Merces (mercy) will intercede for him. But when he finally encounters his Joi Novel (new joy) in her castle, her haughtiness is unbearable:

on mi mostret tant gran orguoill cum si tengues del mon la clau.	where she demonstrated such great pride as if she held the key to the world.

Daude, like many troubadours, turns to Bel Desir (fair desire) for assistance, but he sometimes employs the term bel desir to refer to the lady's desire as well as his own and sometimes possibly even to a male confidante when his lover becomes troublesome.

Daude's surviving music has some features in common with Gui d'Ussel, to whom he refers in his tenso, but it is less motivically varied than Gui's. It, too, however, is through-composed. It is possible that Daude also had contact with Peire Cardenal or Guiraut Riquier in Rodez.

== Works ==
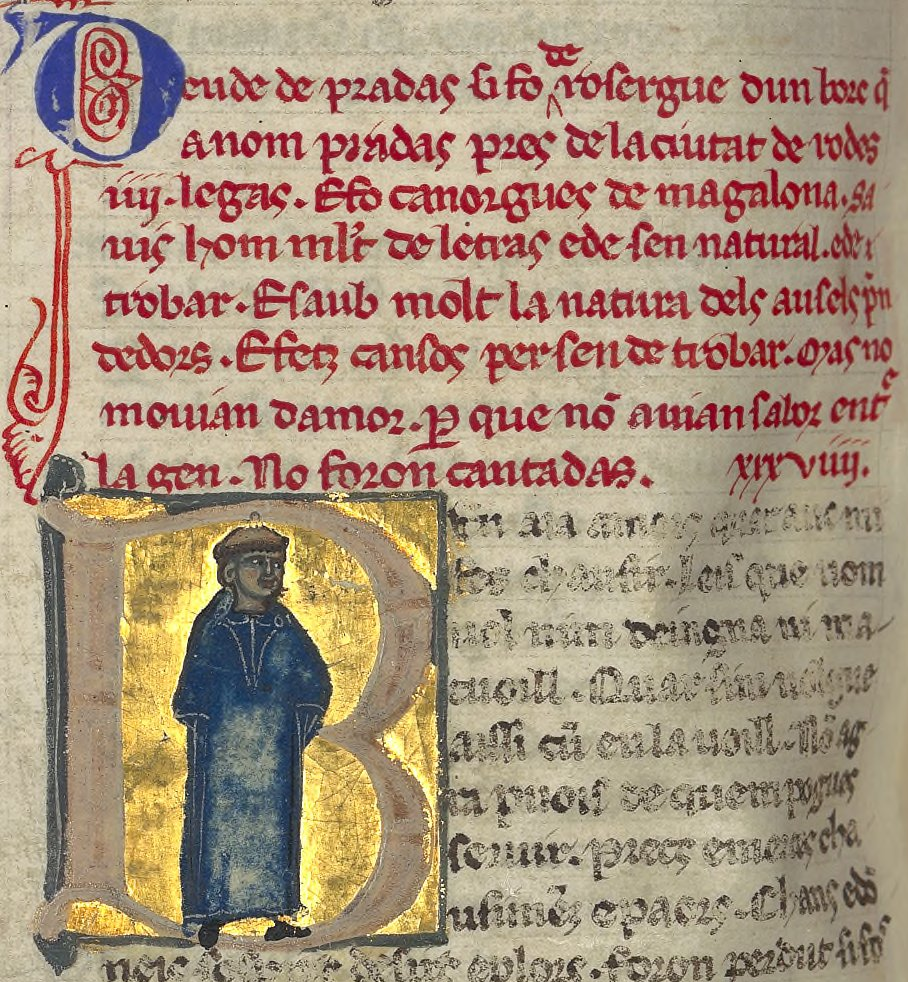
A picture of Daude accompanies his vida in the manuscript. He is portrayed with a tonsure.

- Ab lo douz temps que renovella
- Anc mais hom tan ben non amet
- Ben ay' Amors, quar anc me fes chauzir
- De lai on son tug miei desir
- Pois Merces no.m val ni m'ajuda
- Puois amors vol e comanda
- Si per amar ni per servir
- Tan sen al cor un amoros desir
- Trop ben m'estera si.s tolgues
- El temps que.l rossignols s'esgau
- En un sonet guay e leugier
- No cugiey mais ses comjat far chanso
- Qui finamen sap cossirar
- Amors m'envida e-m somo
- No.m puesc mudar que no-m ressit
- Del bel dezir que Joys Novels m'adutz
- Ben deu esser solatz marritz
- Sitot m'ai pres un pauc de dan
- Al temps d'estiu, qan s'alegron l'ausel
- D'ome fol ni desconoisen

== Sources ==
- Melani, Silvio. Per sen de trobar. L'opera lirica di Daude de Pradas. Publications de l'association internationale d'études occitanes, XI. Turnhout: Brepols Publishers, 2016. ISBN 978-2-503-56833-1.
- Aubrey, Elizabeth. The Music of the Troubadours. Indiana University Press, 1996. ISBN 0-253-21389-4.
- Egan, Margarita, ed. and trans. The Vidas of the Troubadours. New York: Garland, 1984. ISBN 0-8240-9437-9.
- Gaunt, Simon, and Kay, Sarah, edd. The Troubadours: An Introduction. Cambridge: Cambridge University Press, 1999. ISBN 0-521-57473-0.
- Schutz, A. H. "A Note on the Localization of Daude de Pradas." Speculum, 15:4, (Oct., 1940), pp. 478–479.
- Schutz, A. H. (Ed.) Poésies de Daude de Pradas. Toulouse and Paris: Bibliothèque méridionale 22, (1933)
