= Jean Michel (poet) =

French dramatic poet (c.1435-1501)

Jean Michel (c. 1435–1501) was a French dramatic poet of the fifteenth century known for revising and enlarging the passion play "the Mystery of the Passion" (French title Le mystère de la passion) by Arnoul Gréban. There are three Michels mentioned in connection with this work. There is Bishop Jean Michel of Angers (died 1447), a "Maistre Jehan Michel" who was first physician of King Charles VIII (died 1495), and the physician to the dauphin, son of Charles VIII (died 1501). The bishop is considered the least likely candidate for being the poet, having died too early, while the physician to the dauphin is the most likely, due to the latter also being associated with Angers, and the work being produced for the first time in its new shape at Angers in 1486.

Besides his contributions to Gréban's Passion, Jean Michel composed another mystery, a Resurrection, which was played at Angers on the occasion of King René's visit to that city. Jean Michel has not the dryness of his predecessor; on the other hand he lacks his accuracy. He incorporates into his mysteries the most extravagant legends and the fantastic information found in the apocryphal writers. He delights in pictures of low city life in the fifteenth century, and his language is often realistic in the extreme.
