= Uc Brunet =

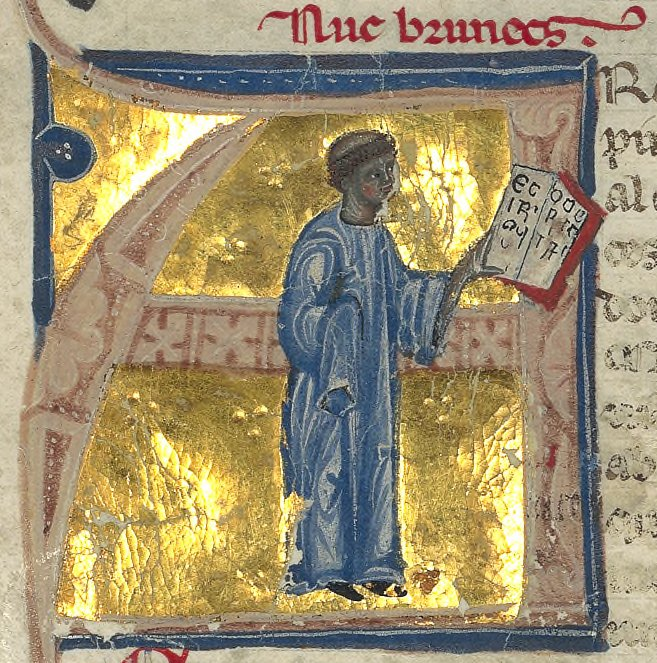
Huc Brunets, as he is called in the manuscript, is depicted as a tonsured cleric and man of letters.

Uc Brunet, Brunec, or Brunenc (English: Hugh, Latin: Ugo; fl. 1190–1220) was a nobleman and troubadour from Rodez in the Rouergue. Six of his works survive.

Outside of his own works and those of other troubadours, including a vida, Uc is mentioned in only one document dated to around 1190. The document relates the settlement between Uc and the abbey of Bonnecombe, from which Uc had demanded free lodging for himself, five of his knights, and a servant. Uc's career can be extended as late as the c. 1220 by the planh (lament) written on his death by Daude de Pradas, who was only active from about that time. Among Uc's patrons were Hugh II of Rodez, his suzerain; Alfonso II of Aragon; Raymond VI of Toulouse; Bernard VII of Anduze; and Dalfi d'Alvernha.

The author of Uc's vida (biography), whose reliability is difficult to ascertain, states that Uc was a cleric well-versed in letters with a natural wit. From this background he became a jongleur and then a troubadour, but he never, according to his vida, composed any music. Nonetheless, one of his songs is accompanied by a melody in one manuscript; the melody may be Uc's or somebody else's.

Uc's vida provides an interesting story which cannot be verified that Uc fell in love with a bourgeois women named Galiana, from Aurillac. She dismissed him, however, and took Hugh of Rodez as her lover. In his pain Uc Brunet entered the "order of Cartosa" (probably an unidentified charterhouse) and there died.

One of Hugh's datable works is a sirventes, "Conplidas razos novelas e plazens", which mentions the death of los comtes, evidently the count of Rodez, in 1208. It is the only work of Uc's to survive with a melody. The melody is melismatic and tonal with its centre generally on F, though it ends on D.

== Sources ==
- Aubrey, Elizabeth. The Music of the Troubadours. Indiana University Press, 1996. ISBN 0-253-21389-4.
- Egan, Margarita, ed. and trans. The Vidas of the Troubadours. New York: Garland, 1984. ISBN 0-8240-9437-9.
