= François Toussaint Gros =

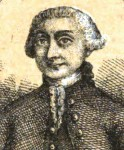
Illustration of Gros from the 1841 edition of his book

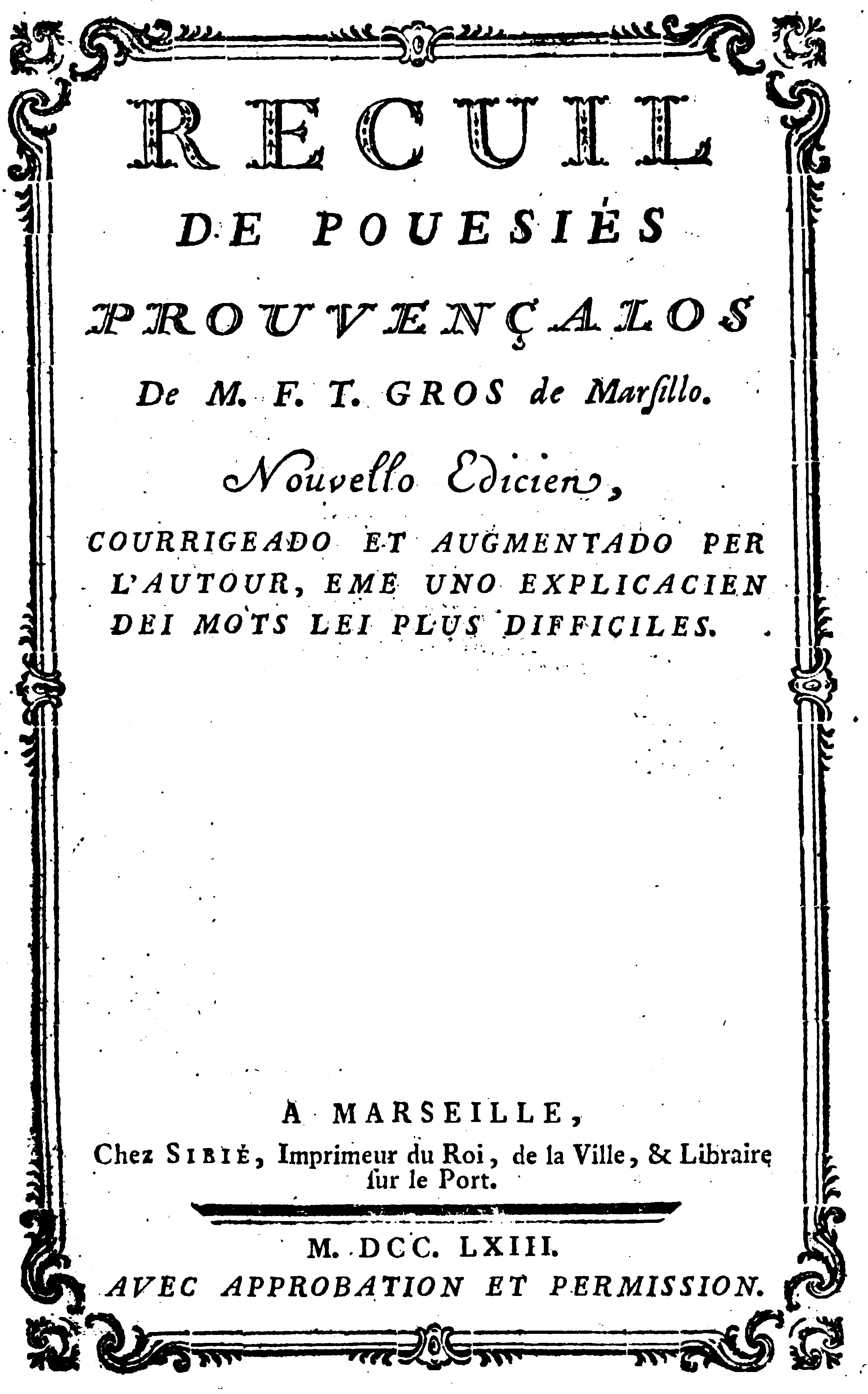
Cover of 1763 edition of Recuil

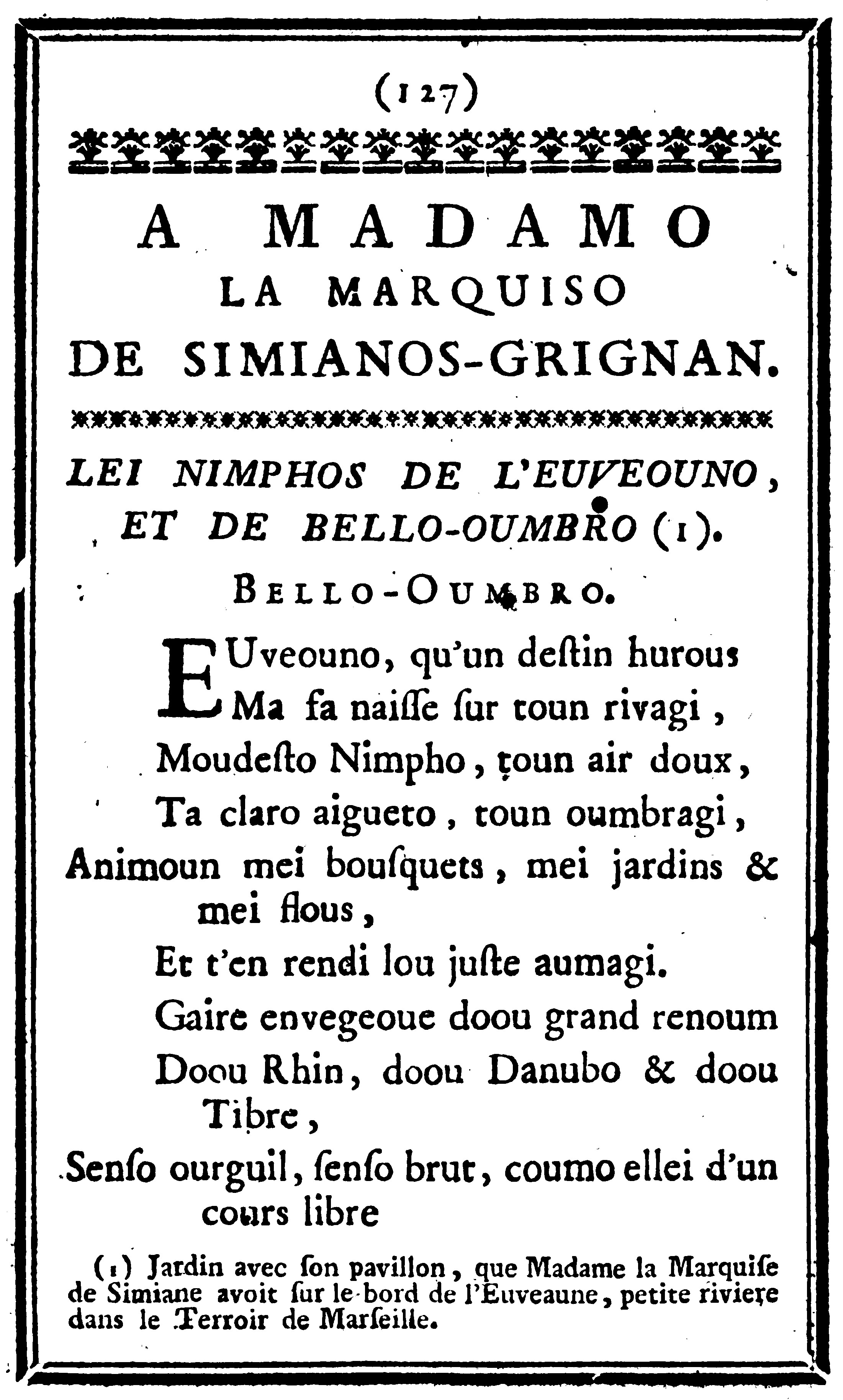
A page from one of Gros' books

François Toussaint Gros (Occitan: Francés Totsants Gròs, IPA: [fɾãnˈses tutˈsãn ɡɾɔs]) was an Occitan-language writer from Provence.

Gros was born in Marseille and studied to be a priest, however he was never ordained. He was a friend of Marquise Pauline de Simiane (grand daughter of Madame de Sévigné). He lived in Paris for a time where he got married and had children and finally settled in Lyon where he obtained the administrative charge of fermier and where he died.
