= Henry II of Rodez =

13th-century French nobleman and troubadour

Henry II (Occitan: Enric II de Rodés; c. 1236–1304), of the House of Millau, was the Count of Rodez and Viscount of Carlat from 1274 until his death. He was the son of Hugh IV of Rodez and Isabeau de Roquefeuil.

Henry II was a troubadour and patron of troubadours. He composed six poems that survive: four tensos and two partimens (alternatively five torneyamens). His short vida records an exchange of couplets between lo coms de Rodes (the count of Rhodes) and Uc de Saint Circ. The count claims to have got Uc back on his feet through his generous patronage. Among the other troubadours who were supported at Henry's court were Guiraut Riquier, Folquet de Lunel, Cerverí de Girona, Bertran Carbonel, Raimon de Castelnou and Bernart de Tot-lo-mon.

== Marriages and children ==
Henry II married three times. His first wife, married in 1256, was Marquise, daughter of Barral des Baux. They had one daughter named Isabeau who inherited the viscounty of Carlat and married the troubadour Geoffrey, lord of Pons. Though Marquise died in 1276, she was repudiated sometime before that in favour of Mascarosse, daughter of Bernard IV of Comminges. The latter bore Henry four children:

- Hugh
- Cecilia (1275–1313), successor, married (1298) Bernard VI of Armagnac
- Beatrix de Rodez, lady of Scorailles and Saint-Christophe, married (1295) Bernard IV de La Tour (died 1325)
- Valpurge, viscountess of Creyssel and lady of Roquefeuil, married (1298) Gaston d'Armagnac (died 1326), viscount of Fézenzaguet

Henry was widowered in 1292 and remarried for the last time in 1302 to Anne (died 1351), daughter of Aymar III of Valentinois. The couple had no children and the widowed Anne remarried to John I, Dauphin of Auvergne.

== Sources ==
- Egan, Margarita, ed. and trans. The Vidas of the Troubadours. New York: Garland, 1984. ISBN 0-8240-9437-9.

Preceded by Hugh IV	Count of Rodez; 1274–1304	Succeeded by Cecilia
