= Jausbert de Puycibot =

13th-century Limousin troubadour

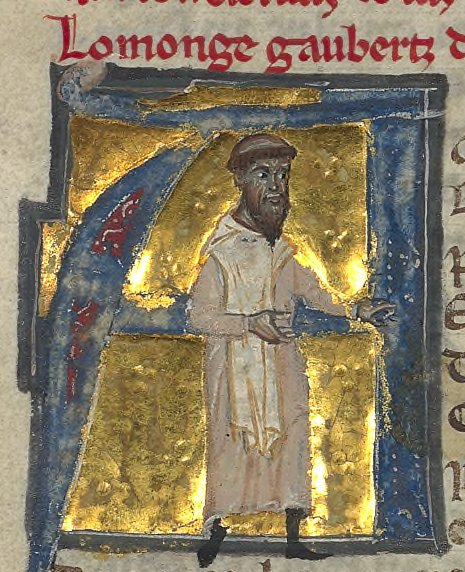
Lo monge Gaubertz. . . "The monk Jausbert. . ."

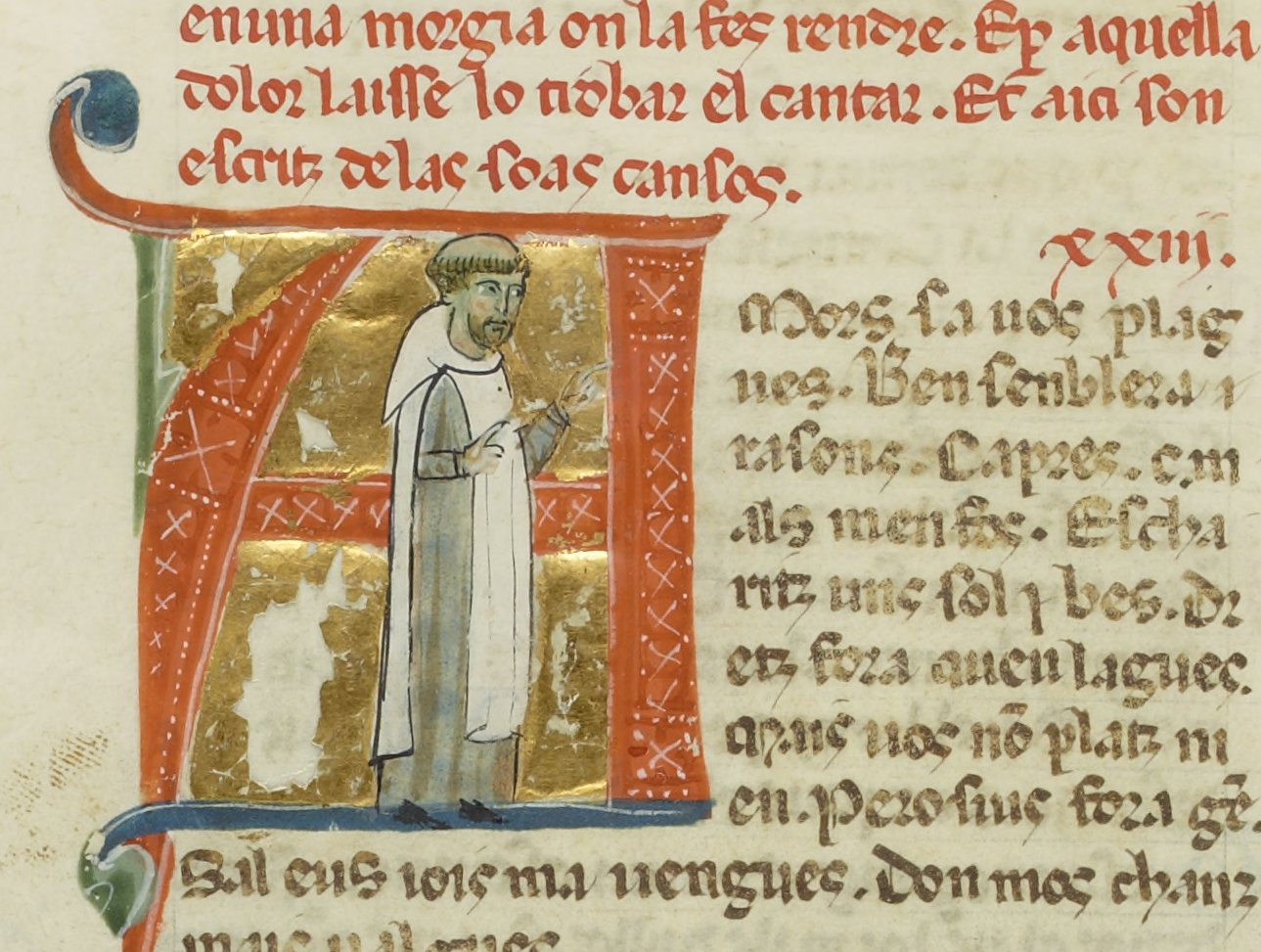
Jausbert portrayed as a monk in another manuscript

Jausbert pleads with a lady

Jausbert de Puycibot (Note: Alternative spellings of his name abound. Jausbert is sometimes given as Gausbert or Audebert, Puycibot as Puicibot or Poicibot. Besides monge (monk), he is sometimes styled mos or en (both meaning "sir" or "lord").) was a Limousin troubadour of the early thirteenth century (fl. 1220–1231). Fifteen of his works have survived (fourteen of them cansos), most of them conventional, but with a few that are expressive of "true feeling". According to some sources, Jausbert was a monk, lo Monge de Poicibot.

The poem S'eu vos voill tan gen lauzar had long been attributed to him, though doubts have arisen due to its appearance in a collection of poems by the Monge de Montaudo. He probably wrote the sirventes (servant song) that, together with another by Bertran de Preissac, forms a tenso (dispute) in which the two troubadours debate the merits of old and young women. Jausbert supports las joves (the youth), while Bertran las vielhas (the aged).

Era quan l'ivernz nos laissa
E par la fuoilla en la vaissa
E il lauzellet chanton c'uns no s'en laissa,
Fas sirventes ses biaissa,
Mas uns malastrucs m'afaissa,
Car ab joves no.s te: Dieus li don aissa!
Mais pretz una vieilla saissa
Que non a ni carn ni craissa.
Mal ai' er el os e daval la madaissa!
Que la genta, covinenta, on bos pretz s'eslaissa,
Fina, francha, frescha, blancha, don jois no.s biaissa,
Mais la vuoill, si gen m'acuoill ni josta se m'acaissa,
Que la rota, que.m des tota Limoges e Aissa.
. . . . . . . . .
En Bertranz men com afacha. . .
E volria n'agues la testa fracha!
Pois parlar l'aug del manjar ni de bon' osta.l tracha,
Al jazer compra.l ben ser, tot lo porc e la vacha,
Quar s'embarga en la pel larga, que es molla e fracha.
Semblanz es, quant hom l'ades, qu'anc no.n trais sa
garnacha.
. . . . . . . . .
E tenc m'a gran desmesura
Que, pois domna desfegura,
Quar ja i fai muzel ni armadura.
Mas prezes de si tal cura
Per que l'arm' estes segura,
Que.l cors desvai a totz jorns e pejura.
Eu lor dic aquest prezic per gran bonaventura.
En Bertran vei a lor dan, e par que, per fraichura,
Cad' aver las! i esper e soffre et abdura.

According to one of the novellas in the Flores novellarum of Francesco da Barberino, Jausbert bumped into his neglected wife while visiting a brothel. Jausbert's works was first edited and published by William P. Shepard under the title Les Poésies de Jausbert de Puycibot (Paris, 1924).

== Sources ==
- Adams, Edward L. Review of Les Poésies de Jausbert de Puycibot by William P. Shepard in Modern Language Notes, Vol. 41, No. 3. (Mar., 1926), pp. 197–200.
- Chambers, Frank M. "On the Attribution of a Provençal Poem." Modern Language Notes, Vol. 62, No. 5. (May, 1947), pp. 320–322.
- Jenkins, T. Atkinson. "On Newness in the Novel." PMLA, Vol. 41, Appendix. (1926), pp. xliii-lix.
- Shepard, William P. "A Provençal Débat on Youth and Age in Women." Modern Philology, Vol. 29, No. 2. (Nov., 1931), pp. 149–161.
