= Amanieu de Sescars =

Miniature depicting Amanieu instructing the donzela

Amanieu de Sescars or Amanieu des Escàs (fl. 1278–1295) was a Catalan, possibly Gascon, troubadour of the late 13th century. Famous for his love songs in his own day, his contemporaries gave him the nickname dieu d'amor (god of love). He wrote two ensenhamens (didactic poems) and two saluts d'amor (love letters) that survive.

The uncertainty about his origins stems from the fact that his poems refer extensively to Catalan people and places, but a singer of the same name is found signing a Gascon document of 1253. Whether the signatory of 1253 and the troubadour are one and the same is left open to doubt, but it is possible that Amanieu was a Catalan who was either born in or lived in Gascony, which was not uncommon at the time.

His earliest datable work is also his shortest, the salut "A vos, que ieu am deszamatz", which was written 24 August 1278. His first ensenhamen was the "Ensenhamen del scudier" about a squire (scudier) who observes his noble master in love, in leisure, and preparing for war and can thus describe the ideal nobleman. It was addressed al comte gent apres En B. d'Astarac (to Bernard IV of Astarac) and must therefore have been written before the count's death in 1291. Also in that period was written his second and longer salut, which refers to James the Just as "reys ... de cecilias", which puts it between 1285, when James inherited Sicily, and 1291, when he inherited Aragon. Amanieu's second didactic work, the "Ensenhamen de la donsela" can be dated between 1291 and 1295 by a reference to James as King of Aragon and to the ongoing War of the Sicilian Vespers. It is addressed to an unnamed donsela (young woman) and is designed to teach her how to behave in courtly society and how to be respected.

Amanieu's poetry is definitely influenced by Peire Vidal and also possibly by Arnaut de Maruelh. The later troubadour Peire Lunel de Montech wrote, in a letter of 1320, "I have heard it said that you [unknown] have [the book, i.e. the ensenhamens] of Sir Amanieu, who is called the god of love, where he teaches about the young woman and the squire."

== Sources ==
- Riquer, Martín de. Los trovadores: historia literaria y textos. 3 vol. Barcelona: Planeta, 1975.
