= Cançó de Santa Fe =

11th-century hagiography in Occitan

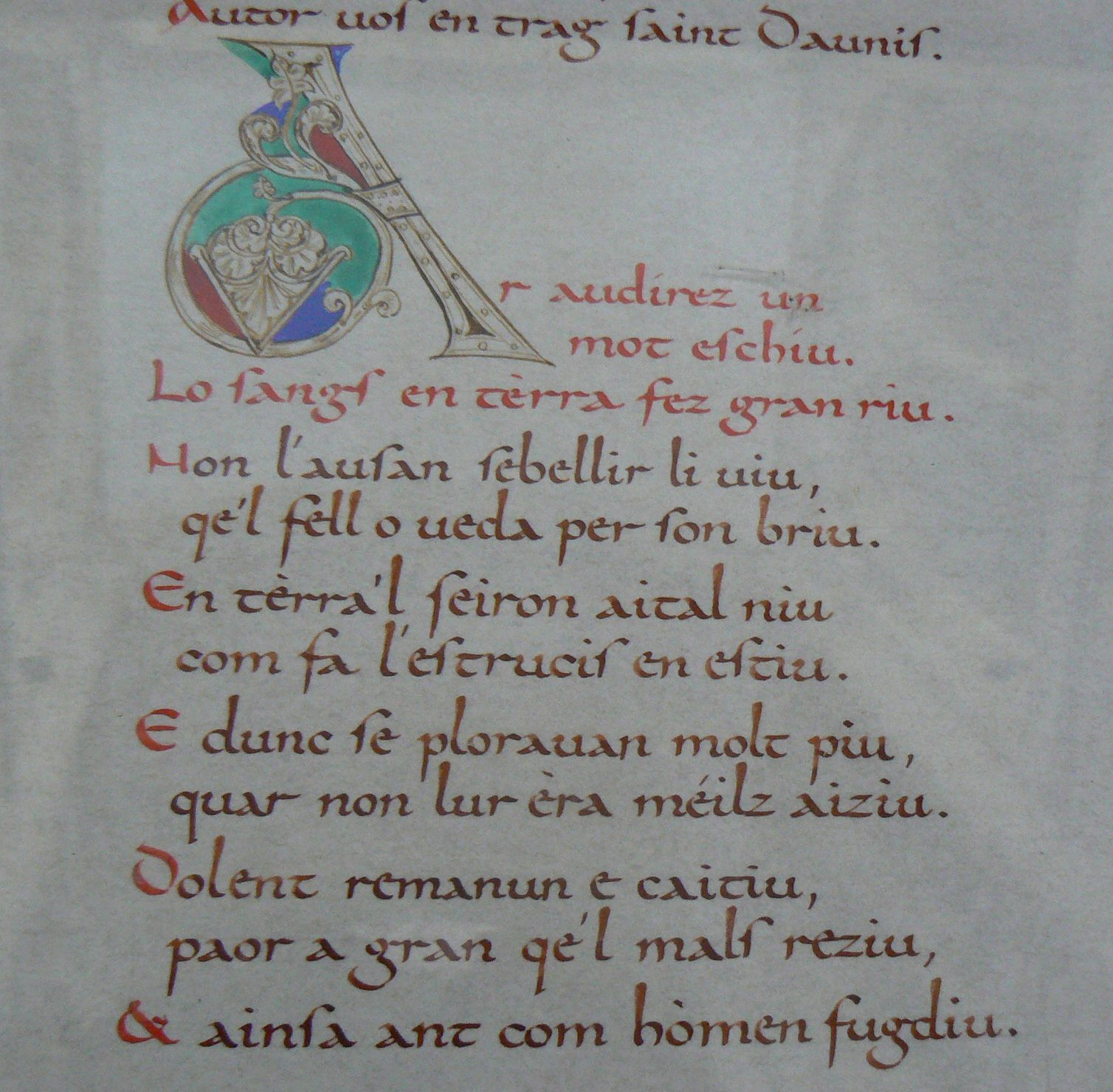
Cançon de santa Fe (Chanson de Sainte Foy). Text section 39: Ar audirez un / mot eschiu. / Lo sangs en tèrra fez gran riu. / Non l'ausan sebellir li uiu, / qe'l fell o ueda per son briu....

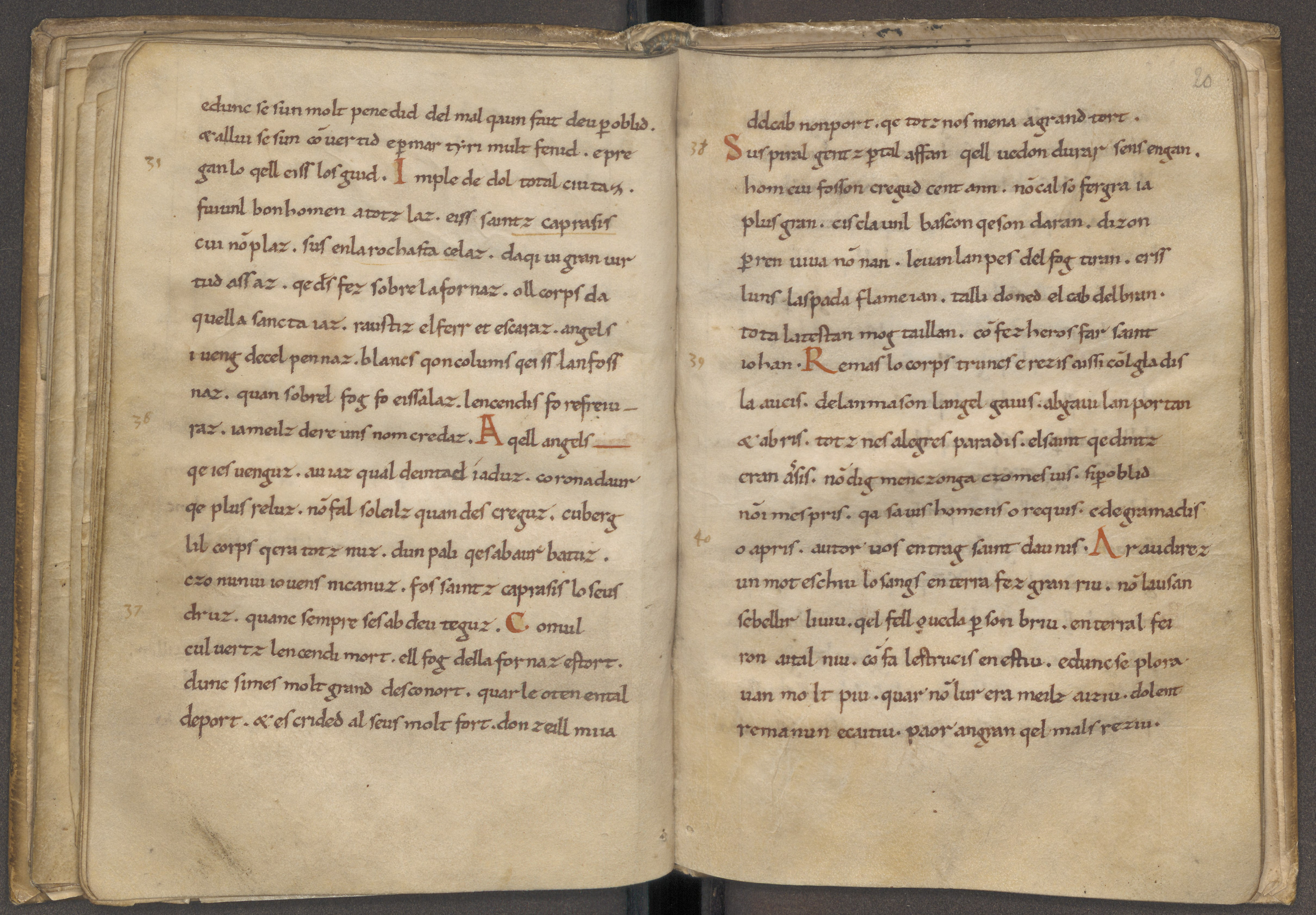
Chanson de sainte Foy d'Agen, bottom right, same text: Ar audirez un.... Folio 19v-20r, Leiden University Library, shelfmark VLO 60.

The Cançó (or Cançon) de Santa Fe (Occitan: [kanˈsu ðe ˈsantɔ ˈfe], Catalan: [kənˈso ðə ˈsantə ˈfɛ]; French: Chanson de Sainte Foi d'Agen, English: Song of Saint Fides), a hagiographical poem about Saint Faith, is an early surviving written work in Old Occitan and has been proposed to be the earliest work in Old Catalan. It is 593 octosyllabic lines long, divided into between 45 and 55 monorhyming laisses. It was written between 1054 and 1076, during the reign of Ramon Berenguer I, Count of Barcelona, by an anonymous poet.

== Origin ==
The place of its composition is controversial. It may have been written in the region around Narbonne. On the other hand, it may belong to the Roussillon, either to the monastery of Sant Miquel de Cuixà, where relics pertaining to Saint Faith are to be found, or that of Sant Martí del Canigó. In Roussillon in the eleventh century, the name Faith (Fides) was relatively common. Other suggested regions include Provence, Cerdagne, and Quercy.

== Language and manuscript ==
The language or dialect of the poem is also debated, since on it hinges the nationalist pride of Catalonia and the thesis that Catalan and Occitan, the language of southern France, were indistinct before the fourteenth century. Ernst Hoepffner (1926) argued that it was "certainly not Catalan". Martín de Riquer (1964) agrees that "one cannot affirm the Catalanity of this beautiful and ingenious poem indubitably". Aurelio Roncaglia (1961) suggests it was written in the lingua d'oc (Occitan) but ai margini della Catalogna (on the margins of Catalonia). As early as 1581 Claude Fauchet believed it was vieil espagnol, pour le moins cathalan (old Spanish, at least Catalan), but the manuscript Fauchet worked from disappeared.

It was rediscovered in 1901 among the works of Ausiàs March in the library of the University of Leiden by José Leite de Vasconcelos. It had evidently been misplaced in 1716 based on its misidentification as a work of March's in 1562. In 1962 J. W. B. Zaal studied Fauchet's manuscript and on the basis of the words razo espanesca found in the Cançó, determined that it was culturally transpyrenean. The manuscript history further supports the notion that the language of the Cançó is of a more Iberian dialect (so that it could be mistaken for late medieval Catalan).

== Martyrdom of Saint Faith ==
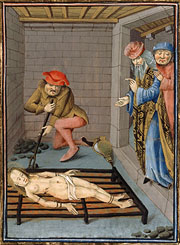
Martyrdom of Saint Faith in a late medieval illustration

The Cançó is a versified narration of the martyrdom of Saint Faith in Agen (c. 300). It is primarily based on the now lost Latin Passio sanctorum Fidis et Caprisii, though seven Latin sources have been identified, including the De mortibus persecutorum of Lactantius.

Elisabeth Work divides it into two distinct parts: a conventional chanson de saint that lasts the first 41 laisses and is based on the traditional sources, and an original chanson de felon corresponding to the final eight laisses. The first part is eloquent and polished, while the latter part is mediocre, often attributed to the phrase a lei francesca, which is taken to indicate that the poet was composing in the manner of the Old French narrative lay. The poet himself narrates the final part with an air of disgust appropriate to the felonious content. Everywhere, however, his language is orthographically, lexically, and rhythmically consistent.

== Popularity ==
According to the final lines of its razo (prologue, section III), the Cançó was popular in the regions of Vasconia, Aragon, and Gascony, where the people can affirm its truth:

Tota Basconn'et Aragons
e l'encontrada delz gascons
sabon qals es aqist canczons,
e ss'es ben vera·sta razons...

Translation: The whole country of the Basques and Aragon / and the region of the Gascons / know what this song is, / and whether this subject is really true.

== Further citation ==
Stanza 39:

Ar audirez un mot eschiu. Lo sangs en tèrra fez gran riu. Non l'ausan sebellir li uiu, qe'l fell o ueda person briu. En tèrra'l feiron aital niu com fa l'estrucis en estiu. E dunc se plorauan molt piu, quar non lur èra méilz aiziu. Dolent remanun e caitiu, paor a gran qu'el malz reziu, & ainsa ant com hòmen fugdiu.

Translation:

Now you will hear a horrible story: the blood on the ground created a great stream; the survivors dare not bury it, for the felon defends it by his violence. In the earth they made him a nest like that made by an ostrich in summer. And so they wept very devoutly, for they had not the convenience of doing better. They remain in pain and misery; they are very afraid that the evil will recur, and they are in anguish like fugitive men.

== Editions ==
- Thomas, Antoine, ed. (1974). "La chanson de Sainte Foi d'Agen : poème provençal du XIe siècle / éd. d'après le ms. de Leide avec fac-sim., trad., notes et glossaire par Antoine Thomas". gallica.bnf.fr. Gallica, Bibliothèque nationale de France.
- French translation by Antoine Thomas on Wikisource.
