= Joan Giraud d'Astròs =

Occitan language writer and Catholic priest

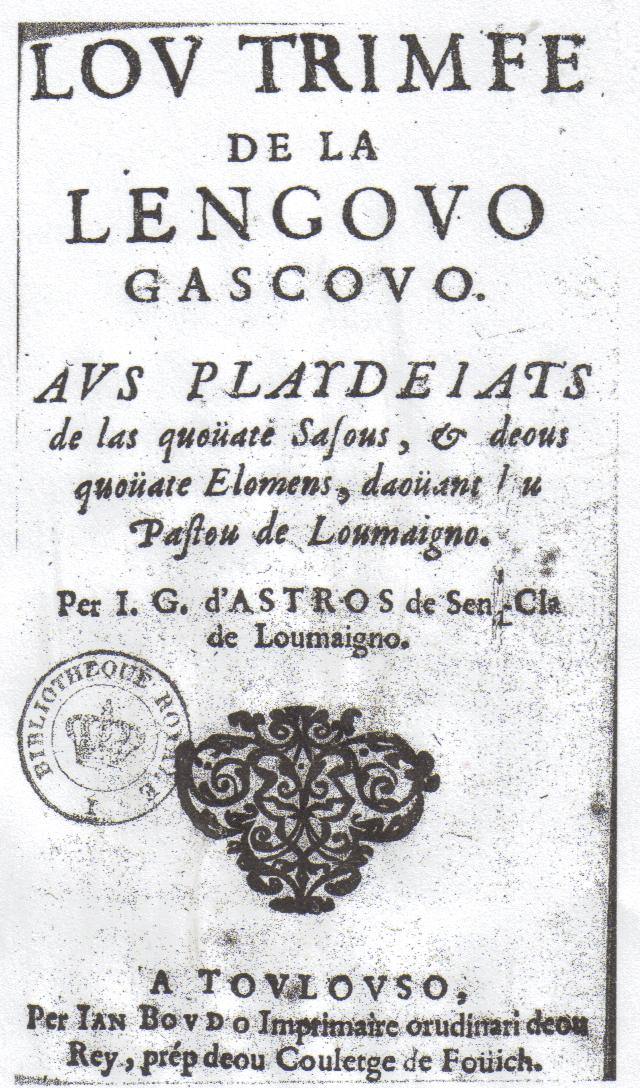

Joan Giraud d'Astròs (in French language Jean-Géraud d'Astros; Jandourdis, Gascony, 1594–1648) was an Occitan language writer and a Catholic priest.

His main work is the poem Lou Trimfe de la lenguo gascouo (Lo Trimfe de la lengua gascoa, edited in 1642).
