= Rigaud, Pons & Compagnie =

18th-century French bookselling firm

Rigaud, Pons & Compagnie was a bookselling firm in Montpellier, France, in the 18th century.

== Titles published by the firm ==
- Henri Fouquet (1772), Traitement de la petite verole des enfans, a l'usage des habitans de la campagne, & du peuple dans les provinces méridionales, Amsterdam, et se trouve à Montpellier: Rigaud, Pons & Compagnie ...; et la veuve Gontier & Faure ..., OL 18640681M
- Genssane (1776), Géométrie souterraine, Montpellier: Rigaud, Pons & Compagnie
- Rigaud (1777), Mémoire ou manuel sur l'éducation des vers à soie, Montpellier: Rigaud, Pons & Compagnie
- Loix municipales et économiques du Languedoc, vol. 3, Montpellier: Rigaud & Pons, 1780, archived from the original on 2013-02-13

== See also ==
- Books in France
