= Louis Gabriel Michaud =

French writer (1773–1858)

Biographie universelle ancienne et moderne (1843)

Louis-Gabriel Michaud (French pronunciation: [lwi ɡabʁijɛl miʃo]; 19 January 1773, Castle Richemont – 8 March 1858) was a French writer, historian, printer, and bookseller. He was notable as the compiler of Biographie Universelle (1811–).

== Life ==
He became a lieutenant on 15 July 1791 and joined the Zweibrücken Regiment. In 1792 he participated in the Battle of Valmy and the Battle of Jemappes. Having reached the rank of captain in the 102nd line regiment, he left the army for health reasons.

In 1797, with his brother Joseph François Michaud and N. Giguet (died in 1810), he founded a (at first clandestine) printing press, specializing in books about religion and the monarchy. He was imprisoned with his brother and N. Giguet for several months in 1799 for having printed anti-Bonapartist literature. He obtained his first commission from abbot Jacques Delille, then a refugee in London, who entrusted him with his books to be printed.

== Universal Biography ==
In 1802 he published a biography of many notable individuals at the end of the 18th century and early 19th century. He described their ranks, their jobs, their talents, their writings, their troubles, their virtues, or their crimes in 4 volumes. Allegedly, it was copied in Breslau and Leipzig, which led to the failure of the project and his bankruptcy. It is probably this experience that led him eventually to consider the Ancient and Modern Universal Biography. His brother helped him at the onset, and many other authors contributed also.

He was nominated printer in January 1811 and bookseller in October 1812.

In 1823 he was appointed Director of the Royal Printing Press, but the appointment was brief. Michaud played a significant role in the return of Louis XVIII and expected a sinecure, but he was only rewarded with the Legion of Honour. He grew bitter and became opposed to the king's liberal policies.

Michaud was author of historical books, in particular Historical Outline and Rationale of the First Wars of Bonaparte (1814).

He was the editor of several newspapers and wrote prefaces to royalist books that he printed. He remains best known as the editor of the Universal Biography (1811-), to which he contributed numerous articles. He also assisted with the new much more extensive edition, which was not published until after his death.

== Works ==
Apart from numerous prefaces to works that he printed, Louis-Gabriel Michaud also published:

- 1802: Biographie moderne ou des hommes vivants
- 1811: Biographie universelle ancienne et moderne : histoire par ordre alphabétique de la vie publique et privée de tous les hommes, first edition in 85 volumes with supplements (1811–1862)
- 1814: Tableau historique et raisonné des premières guerres de Bonaparte (Historical Outline and Rationale of the First Wars of Bonaparte)
- 1843: Biographie universelle ancienne et moderne : histoire par ordre alphabétique de la vie publique et privée de tous les hommes, 2nd edition in 45 vols (1843–1865)
- 1851: The Public and Private Life of Louis Phillip of Orleans, Ex-king of France, translated by V. L. Chemery, London: Hamilton, Adams & Company
