= County of Rodez =

County of Rodez Comté de Rodez (French)
- Early 11 Century–1313
- Coat of arms
- Capital: Rodez
- Religion: Catholicism
- Government: County
- Count of Rodez
  - Early 11th Century: Richard I
  - 1304-1313: Cecilla
- Historical era: High Middle Ages
  - Established: Early 11 Century
  - United with Armagnac: 1313
Preceded by	Succeeded by
County of Rouergue	County of Armagnac
- Today part of: Aveyron

The County of Rodez was a fief of the County of Toulouse formed out of part of the old County of Rouergue in what is today Aveyron, France. Its capital was Rodez. At its height, it was a centre of troubadour culture.

On the death of Hugh of Rouergue in 1053, Bertha, his heiress, disputed the Rouergue with William IV of Toulouse and Raymond of Saint-Gilles, distant relations. A decade of war ensued, but Bertha died in 1065 and William and Raymond took to fighting each other for the Rouergue. Since William was already count of Toulouse an agreement was reached whereby Raymond was recognised in the Rouerge. When Raymond succeeded William in 1094, Rouergue became an appanage for the younger sons of the counts of Toulouse. When Raymond left on the First Crusade at the end of October 1096, however, he left Richard III of Millau, a younger son of Viscount Berengar of Millau and Rodez, in charge of the citadel of Rodez and several castles. Taking advantage of the war between Raymond's successor, Alfonso Jordan, and William IX of Aquitaine, Richard made himself count in 1112. Rodez remained with the house of Millau until 1304, when it passed to Bernard VI of Armagnac, husband of Cecilia, heiress of the last Millau count, Henry II.

== Viscounts of Millau and Rodez ==
- Richard I (died 1013/1025)
- Richard II (died 1050)
- Berengar (from 1051)
- Richard III (until 1112)

== Counts of the house of Millau ==
- Richard III (1112–1135)
- Hugh I (1135–1159)
- Hugh II (1159–1208)
- Hugh III (1195–1196)
- William (1196–1208)
- Henry I (1208–1221)
- Hugh IV (1221–1274)
- Henry II (1274–1304)
- Cecilia (1304–1313)

United to Armagnac.
