= Auguste Rigaud =

French poet and fabulist (1760–1835)

- Born: Auguste-Pierre-Augustin Rigaud; 29 March 1760; Montpellier
- Died: 15 April 1835 (aged 75); Brive-la-Gaillarde
- Occupations: Poet; Fabulist

Auguste-Pierre-Augustin Rigaud (29 March 1760 – 15 April 1835) was a French poet and fabulist.

== Publications ==
- Las Vendemias de Pignan, pouima coumpdousat en 1780, Mounpéïé, J. G. Touruel, in-16, an II;
- Poesias patouèsas d’Augusta Rigaud et de Cyrilla Rigaud, Mounpéïé, 1806, in-16, (p. 120) and 2 unnumbered pages, Renaud.(This second édition doesn't include the Aristocratia chassàda dé Mounpéïé, poem recited in one of the sessions of the "Friends of the Constitution" (5 December 1790) at the meeting of the National Guard at the club in this city, which part is in the first edition (p. 31).)
- Guttemberg, ou l’Origine de l’imprimerie, poème, in Recueil des bulletins de la société des sciences, belles-lettres et arts de Montpellier, t.5, 1813, (p. 3);
- Hubert Goffin, ode, loc. cit., (p. 302);
- Poésies françaises, Paris, 1820, in-18, 4 vol.
- Élégie aux mânes de mon ami Berthe, Montpellier, Félix Avignon, 1822, in-8°, (p. 5) et faux titre.
- Fables nouvelles, Paris, Peytieux, 1823, in-8°, avec frontispice lithographié; 2e vol., 1824.
- Contes et fabliaux, Paris, Peytieux, 1824, 1 vol. gr. in-32; 2e edition, 1825, id.
- Fables, contes et poésies diverses, Paris, Ledoyen, 1833, 2 vol. in-18.
- Recueil de contes, Paris, 1825, in-12.
- Obras coumplétas d’Augusta Rigaud et de Cyrilla Rigaud, en patouès dé Mounpéïé, séguidas d’un chouès dé roumanças et cansous patouèsas dé divers douturs. Trouésiéma éditioun, Mounpéïé, A. Virenque, 1845, in-16, (p. 195).

== Sources ==
- Joseph-François Michaud, Louis-Gabriel Michaud, Biographie universelle, ancienne et moderne. Supplément., t.79, Paris, Louis-Gabriel Michaud, 1863, (p. 142).
- The complete collection of his autograph manuscripts is available at the library of Lunel. There is also his commercial and poetic correspondence with Louis Médard.
