= Old Occitan =

Language of the Occitano-Romance group

- Old Provençal
- romans, proensals
- Region: Languedoc, Provence, Dauphiné, Auvergne, Limousin, Aquitaine, Gascony
- Era: Evolved into Modern Occitan by the 14th century
- Language family: Indo-European: Italic; Latino-Faliscan; Latin; Romance; Italo-Western; Western Romance; Gallo-Iberian; Gallo-Romance (Note: Some Iberian scholars may alternatively classify Occitan as Iberian Romance.); Occitano-Romance; Old Occitan

Language codes
- ISO 639-2: pro
- ISO 639-3: pro
- Glottolog: oldp1253
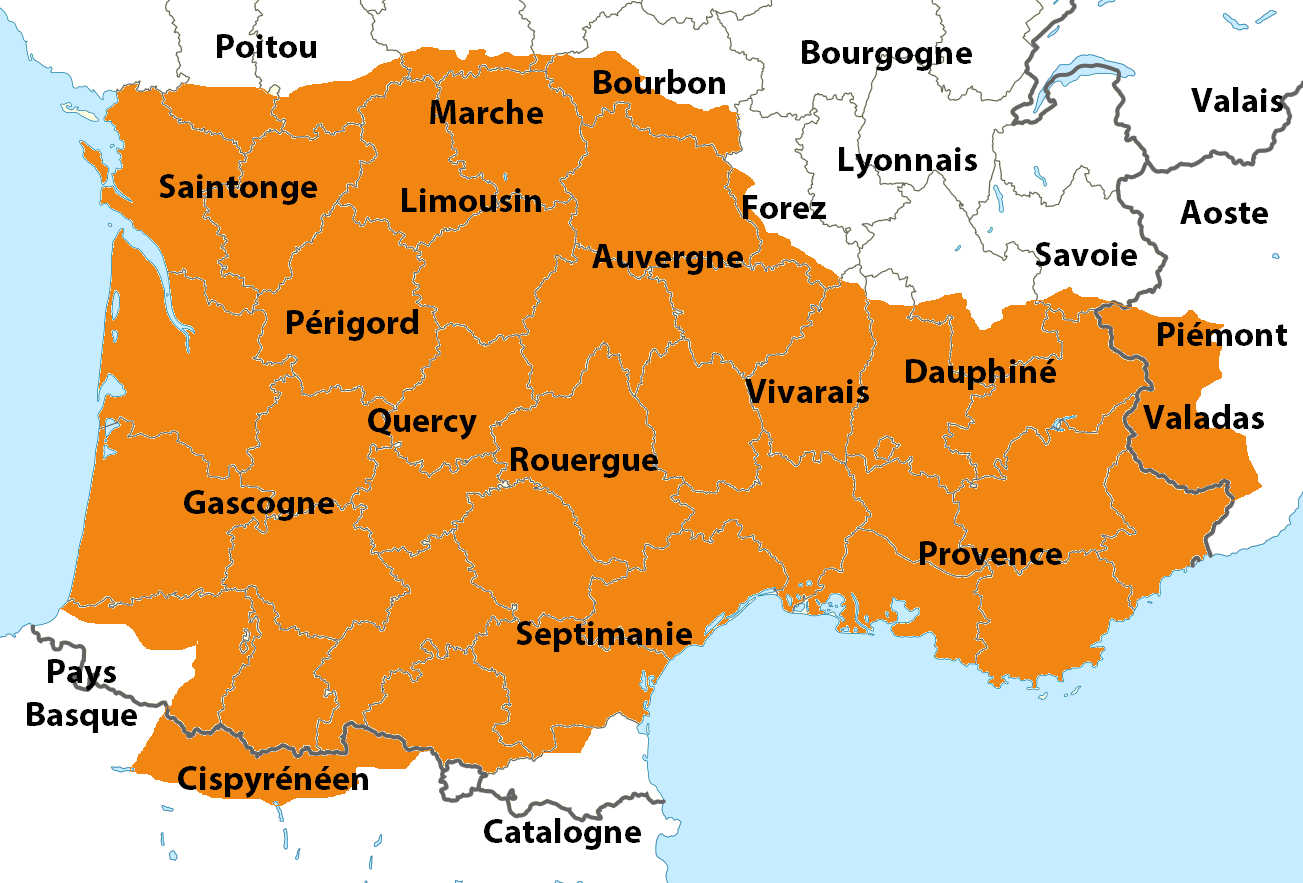
- The extent of Old Occitan according to the 12th-century Codex Calixtinus

Old Occitan (Modern Occitan: occitan ancian, Catalan: occità antic), also called Old Provençal, was the earliest form of the Occitano-Romance languages, as attested in writings dating from the 8th to the 14th centuries. Old Occitan generally includes Early and Old Occitan. Middle Occitan is sometimes included in Old Occitan, sometimes in Modern Occitan. As the term occitanus appeared around the year 1300, Old Occitan is referred to as "Romance" (Occitan: romans) or "Provençal" (Occitan: proensals) in medieval texts.

== History ==
Gallo-Romance languages.: 1. Current limits of the Occitan language; 2. Former limits of the Occitan language before the 13th century.

Among the earliest records of Occitan are the Tomida femina, the Boecis and the Cançó de Santa Fe. Old Occitan, the language used by the troubadours, was the first Romance language with a literary corpus and had an enormous influence on the development of lyric poetry in other European languages. The interpunct was a feature of its orthography and survives today in Catalan and Gascon.

The official language of the sovereign principality of the Viscounty of Béarn was the local vernacular Bearnès dialect of Old Occitan. It was the spoken language of law courts and of business and it was the written language of customary law. Although vernacular languages were increasingly preferred to Latin in western Europe in the late Middle Ages, the status of Occitan in Béarn was unusual because its use was required by law: "lawyers will draft their petitions and pleas in the vernacular language of the present country, both in speech and in writing".

Old Catalan and Old Occitan diverged between the 11th and the 14th centuries. Catalan never underwent the shift from /u/ to /y/ or the shift from /o/ to /u/ (except in unstressed syllables in some dialects) and so had diverged phonologically before those changes affected Old Occitan.

== Phonology ==
Old Occitan changed and evolved somewhat during its history, but the basic sound system can be summarised as follows:

=== Consonants ===
Old Occitan consonants
	Labial	Dental/ alveolar	Postalveolar/ palatal	Velar
Nasal	m	n	ɲ	
Plosive	p b	t d		k ɡ
Fricative	f v	s z		
Affricate		ts dz	tʃ dʒ	
Lateral		l	ʎ	
Trill		r		
Tap		ɾ		

Notes:

- Written ⟨ch⟩ is believed to have represented the affricate [tʃ], but since the spelling often alternates with ⟨c⟩, it may also have represented [k] in some cases.
- Word-final ⟨g⟩ may sometimes represent [tʃ], as in gaug "joy" (also spelled gauch).
- Intervocalic ⟨z⟩ could represent either [z] or [dz].
- Written ⟨j⟩ could represent either [dʒ] or [j].

=== Vowels ===
==== Monophthongs ====
	Front	Central	Back
Close	i y		u
Close-mid	e		(o)
Open-mid	ɛ		ɔ
Open		a	

- Original /u/ (from Latin /uː/) fronted to /y/. When this occurred is unclear: some scholars prefer the tenth or eleventh century, while others favour the thirteenth century. Either way, original /o/ (from Latin /u/ and /oː/) subsequently raised to the vacated position, becoming /u/. Both phonemes maintained their original spelling (⟨u⟩ for /y/, ⟨o⟩ for /u/), although in the fourteenth century an alternative spelling ⟨ou⟩ was also introduced for /u/ under French influence.
- The open-mid vowels [ɛ] and [ɔ] variably diphthongized in stressed position when followed by a semivowel or palatalised consonant, and sporadically elsewhere, but retained their value as separate vowel phonemes with minimal pairs such as pèl /pɛl/ "skin" and pel /pel/ "hair".

==== Diphthongs and triphthongs ====
Old Occitan diphthongs and triphthongs
IPA	Example	Meaning
falling
/aj/	paire	father
/aw/	autre	other
/uj/	conoiser	to know
/uw/	dous	sweet
/ɔj/	pois	then
/ɔw/	mou	it moves
/ej/	vei	I see
/ew/	beure	to drink
/ɛj/	seis	six
/ɛw/	breu	short
/yj/	cuid	I believe
/iw/	estiu	summer
rising
/jɛ/	miels	better
/wɛ/	cuelh	he receives
/wɔ/	cuolh	he receives
triphthongs stress always falls on middle vowel
/jɛj/	lieis	her
/jɛw/	ieu	I
/wɔj/	nuoit	night
/wɛj/	pueis	then
/wɔw/	uou	egg
/wɛw/	bueu	ox

== Graphemics ==
Old Occitan is a non-standardised language regarding its spelling, meaning that different graphemic signs can represent one sound and vice versa. For example:

- ⟨l⟩, ⟨lh⟩, or ⟨ll⟩ for [ʎ];
- ⟨s⟩, or ⟨ss⟩ for [s];
- ⟨z⟩, or ⟨s⟩ for [z];
- word-final ⟨g⟩ or ⟨ch⟩ for [tʃ]

== Morphology ==
Some notable characteristics of Old Occitan:

- It had a two-case system (nominative and oblique), as in Old French, with the oblique derived from the Latin accusative case. The declensional categories were also similar to those of Old French; for example, the Latin third-declension nouns with stress shift between the nominative and accusative were maintained in Old Occitan only in nouns referring to people.
- There were two distinct conditional tenses: a "first conditional", similar to the conditional tense in other Romance language, and a "second conditional", derived from the Latin pluperfect indicative tense. The second conditional is cognate with the literary pluperfect in Portuguese, the -ra imperfect subjunctive in Spanish, the second preterite of very early Old French (Sequence of Saint Eulalia) and probably the future perfect in modern Gascon.

== Extracts ==
- From Bertran de Born's Ab joi mou lo vers e·l comens (c. 1200, translated by James H. Donalson):

Bela Domna·l vostre cors gens
E·lh vostre bel olh m'an conquis,
E·l doutz esgartz e lo clars vis,
E·l vostre bels essenhamens,
Que, can be m'en pren esmansa,
De beutat no·us trob egansa:
La genser etz c'om posc'e·l mon chauzir,
O no·i vei clar dels olhs ab que·us remir.

Translation:

O pretty lady, all your grace
and eyes of beauty conquered me,
sweet glance and brightness of your face
and all your nature has to tell
so if I make an appraisal
I find no one like in beauty:
most pleasing to be found in all the world
or else the eyes I see you with have dimmed.

== See also ==
- Occitan conjugation
- Occitan phonology
