= Carlat =

Commune in Auvergne-Rhône-Alpes, France

- Commune
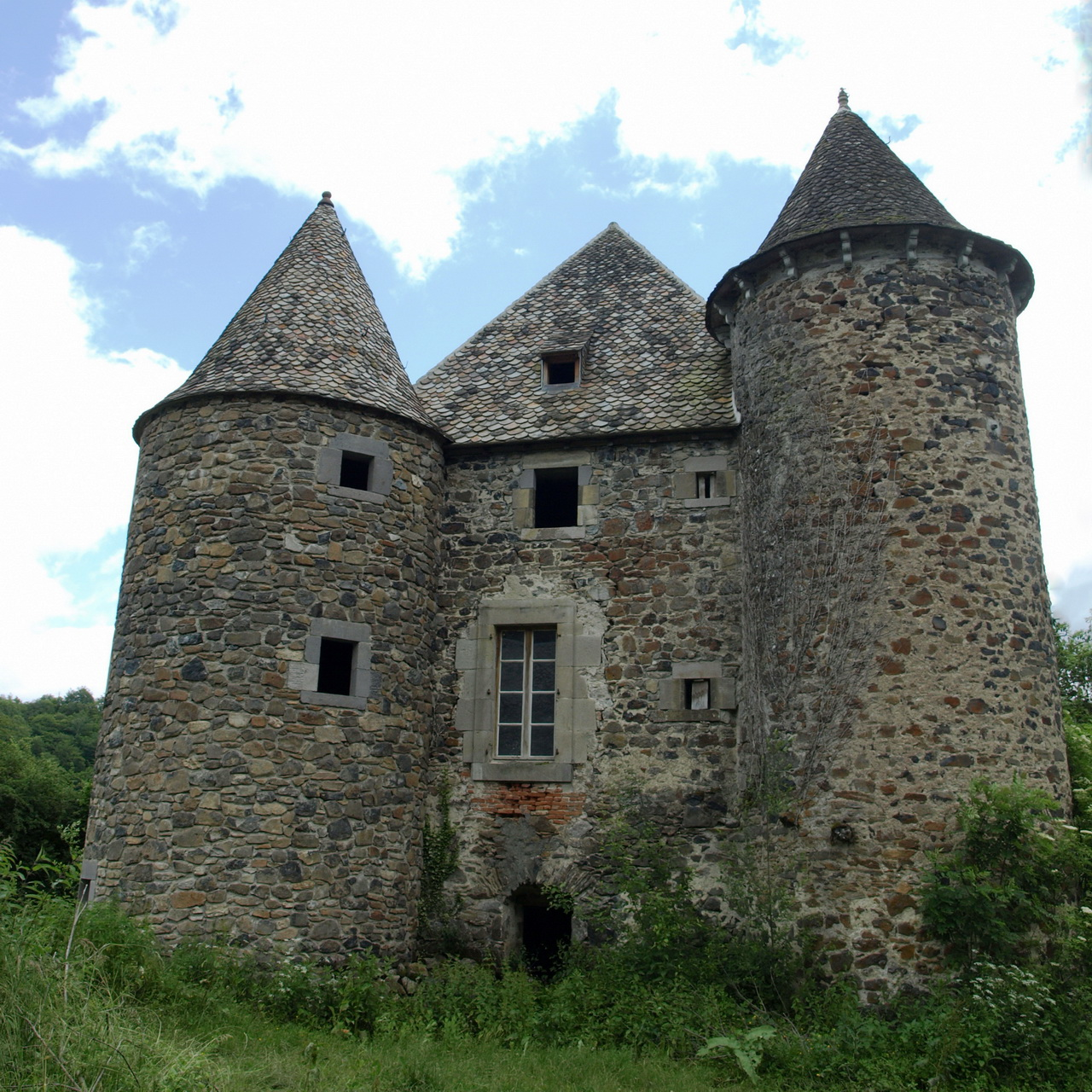
- Chateau of Celles

- Coat of arms
- Location of Carlat
- Location within France Location within Auvergne-Rhône-Alpes
- Coordinates: 44°53′25″N 2°34′03″E
- Country: France
- Region: Auvergne-Rhône-Alpes
- Department: Cantal
- Arrondissement: Aurillac
- Canton: Vic-sur-Cère
- Intercommunality: CA Aurillac Agglomération

Government
  - Mayor (2020–2026): Yves Alexandre
- Area^{1}: 20.88 km^{2} (8.06 sq mi)
- Highest elevation: 906 m (2,972 ft)
- Lowest elevation: 480 m (1,570 ft)
- Population (2023): 393
  - Density: 18.8/km^{2} (48.7/sq mi)
- Time zone: UTC+01:00 (CET)
  - Summer (DST): UTC+02:00 (CEST)
- INSEE/Postal code: 15028 /15130
- ^{1} French Land Register data, which excludes lakes, ponds, glaciers > 1 km^{2} (0.386 sq mi or 247 acres) and river estuaries.

Carlat (French pronunciation: [kaʁla]) is a commune in the south-central French department of Cantal.

The "Rocher de Carlat" or rock of Carlat situated above the picturesque commune was once the site of one of the most powerful and impenetrable chateaux in all of France. It was the seat of Jacques d'Armagnac, Duke of Nemours and often the center of intrigue, resistance and rebellion against the kings of France. Completely razed by order of the king in 1604 to alleviate the inconvenience of rebellious and ambitious southern relatives, hardly a trace of the chateau remains. The site is now a park, open to visitors and commanding sweeping views of the Carlades.

The chateau appears in history as early as the year 839. The presence of Queen Margot, Marguerite de Valois, who sought refuge at Carlat from 30 September 1585 to 15 October 1586, lives on in local lore. Given the site's historic importance as a major fortress of Auvergne, a substantial archeological program is underway to rediscover its treasures.

== Population ==
Historical population
Year	Pop.	±% p.a.
1968	432	—
1975	394	−1.31%
1982	364	−1.13%
1990	306	−2.15%
1999	305	−0.04%
2007	288	−0.71%
2012	346	+3.74%
2017	352	+0.34%
2023	393	+1.85%
Source: INSEE

== See also ==
- Communes of the Cantal department
