= 1310s in poetry =

Nationality words link to articles with information on the nation's poetry or literature (for instance, Irish or France).

== Works published ==
1310:

- The chansonnier known as "troubadour MS P" was compiled in Lombardy. Now in the Biblioteca Laurenziana, Florence, XLI.42.

1312:

- Jacques de Longuyon writes the chanson de geste Les Voeux du Paon ("The Vows of the Peacock") for Theobald (bishop of Liège).

== Births ==
Death years link to the corresponding "[year] in poetry" article. There are conflicting or unreliable sources for the birth years of many people born in this period; where sources conflict, the poet is listed again and the conflict is noted:

1311:

- Munenaga (died 1385), imperial prince and a poet of the Nijō poetic school of Nanboku-chō period

1315:

- Hafez (died 1390), Persian lyric poet

== Deaths ==
Birth years link to the corresponding "[year] in poetry" article:

1310:

- Gao Kegong (born 1248), Chinese painter and poet
- Henry Bate of Malines (born 1246), Flemish philosopher, theologian, astronomer, astrologer, poet and musician
- Muḥammad Ibn Dāniyāl (born 1248), Arab playwright and poet

1312:

- Cecco Angiolieri (born 1260), Italian
- Sultan Walad (born unknown), Persian poet and Sufi, and a founder of the Mevlevi Order

1313:

- Yao Sui (born 1238), writer of Chinese Sanqu poetry and an official

1314:

- Homam-e Tabrizi (born 1238), Persian poet of the Ilkhanid era

1315:

- Ramon Llull (born 1232), Catalan poet and philosopher
- Lu Zhi (born 1243), Chinese writer and poet of the Yuan dynasty

1316

- Guillaume Guiart, French chronicler and poet

1319:

- Guan Daosheng (born 1262), Chinese poet and painter during the Yuan dynasty

== See also ==
- Poetry
- 14th century in poetry
- 14th century in literature
- List of years in poetry
- Grands Rhétoriqueurs
- French Renaissance literature
- Renaissance literature
- Spanish Renaissance literature

Other events:

- Other events of the 14th century
- Other events of the 15th century

15th century:

- 15th century in poetry
- 15th century in literature
