= 1300s in poetry =

Nationality words link to articles with information on the nation's poetry or literature (for instance, Irish or France).

== Events ==
- 1308 (approx.): Dante Alighieri begins to write the Divine Comedy.

== Works published ==
1303:

- Handlyng Synne by Robert Mannyng of Brunne, a devotional work dealing with the theory and practice of morality

1307:

- Guillaume Guiart, Branche des Royaux lignages, revised version completed

== Births ==
Death years link to the corresponding "[year] in poetry" article. There are conflicting or unreliable sources for the birth years of many people born in this period; where sources conflict, the poet is listed again and the conflict is noted:

1300:

- Chūgan Engetsu (died 1375), Japanese poet, occupies a prominent place in Japanese Literature of the Five Mountains

1304:

- Petrarch (died 1374), Italian scholar, poet and one of the earliest Renaissance humanists

== Deaths ==
Birth years link to the corresponding "[year] in poetry" article:

1300:

- Guido Cavalcanti (born 1255), Italian poet
- Folquet de Lunel (born 1244), troubadour from Lunel (in the modern Hérault)

1301:

- Asukai Gayu (born 1241), Japanese waka poet
- Zahed Gilani (born 1216), a Persian Sufi

1302:

- Guan Hanqing (born 1225), Chinese playwright and poet in the Yuan dynasty
- Roger-Bernard III of Foix (born 1243), the Count of Foix, poet and troubadour

1304:

- Jehan de Lescurel (born unknown), French medieval poet and composer

1308:

- Trần Nhân Tông (born 1258), Vietnamese third emperor of the Trần dynasty who was also a prolific writer and poet

== See also ==
- Poetry
- 14th century in poetry
- 14th century in literature
- List of years in poetry
- Grands Rhétoriqueurs
- French Renaissance literature
- Renaissance literature
- Spanish Renaissance literature

Other events:

- Other events of the 14th century
- Other events of the 15th century

15th century:

- 15th century in poetry
- 15th century in literature
