= Dalfinet =

Dauphinois troubadour

Dalfinet's only song in chansonnier A

Dalfinet (fl. 1220–1269?) was a nobleman and troubadour from Provence.

Earlier scholarship presumed him to be a son of Dalfi d'Alvernhe. That Dalfinet is a nickname derived from his place of origin, however, seems to be indicated by a pair of lines in his own poem, which puts his inheritance in Dalfi, probably the town of Dauphin in the county of Forcalquier. A Dalfinet is attested in documents between 1220 and 1241. He was an adherent of Count Ramon Berenguer V. He may have been a son of lord Raimbault of Dauphin. A Dalfinet, possibly the troubadour, was in Spain in 1269 in the entourage of the future Peter III of Aragon when the latter visited Alfonso X of Castile in Toledo. On 26 April 1269, at Riello near Cuenca, he was paid three solidi. Other troubadours in Peter's entourage at the time include Folquet de Lunel, Paulet de Marselha and Cerverí de Girona.

Only one song he wrote, De meg (Note: Also spelled mieich.) sirventes ai legor, survives. It is a contrafactum, directly or indirectly, of Giraut de Borneil's No puesc sofrir qu'a la dolor and Bertran de Born's Be.m platz lo gais temps de pascor. It is a sirventes (servant song), specifically a mieg-sirventes (half-sirventes). It is noted for its "restless, arrogant tone and the sarcastic pomposity of language".
