= 1244 in poetry =

This article covers 1244 in poetry.

== Events ==
- Lanfranc Cigala writes Si mos chans fos de joi ni de solatz in response to the loss of Jerusalem to the Mamelukes. (approximate date)
- Guilhem Figueira writes Del preveire maior urging peace in Europe for a union against Islam after the fall of Jerusalem. (approximate date)

== Births ==
- Folquet de Lunel, troubadour from Lunel (in the modern department of Hérault) (died 1300)
