= 1246 in poetry =

This article covers 1246 in poetry.

== Works ==
- Gautier de Metz wrote L'Image du monde (French, The Image of the world), a work in poem form about creation

== Births ==
- Henry Bate of Malines (died 1310), Flemish philosopher, theologian, astronomer, astrologer, poet, and musician

== Deaths ==
- Pons d'Ortaffa (born 1170), Catalan nobleman and troubadour
