= Zhao Mengfu =

Chinese calligrapher, painter and scholar

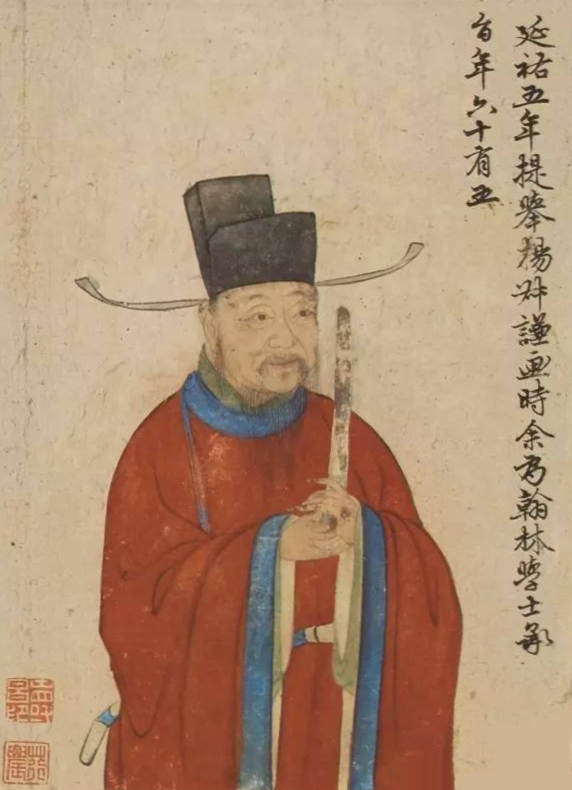
- Portrait of Zhao Mengfu
- Born: 1254
- Died: 1322 (aged 67–68)
- Spouse: Guan Daosheng
- House: House of Zhao
- Father: Zhao Yuyin
- Occupation: Calligrapher, painter, scholar

Zhao Mengfu
- Traditional Chinese: 趙孟頫
- Simplified Chinese: 赵孟𫖯
Transcriptions
Standard Mandarin
- Hanyu Pinyin: Zhào Mèngfǔ
- Wade–Giles: Chao⁴ Mêng⁴-fu³

Zhao Mengfu (Chinese: 趙孟頫; pinyin: Zhào Mèngfǔ; Wade–Giles: Chao Meng-fu; courtesy name Zi'ang (子昂); pseudonyms Songxue (松雪, "Pine Snow"), Oubo (鷗波, "Gull Waves"), and Shuijing-gong Dao-ren (水精宮道人, "Master of the Water Spirits Palace"); 1254–1322), was a Chinese calligrapher, painter, and scholar during the Yuan dynasty. He was a descendant of the Song dynasty's imperial family through Emperor Xiaozong's brother Zhao Bogui who married a lady surnamed Song who was the granddaughter of Emperor Huizong. Zhao Bogui was a descendant of Emperor Taizu, through his son Zhao Defang.

He was recommended by the Censor-in-chief Cheng Jufu to pay an audience with Kublai Khan in 1286 at the Yuan capital of Dadu, but was not awarded an important position in office. His work was however, greatly appreciated later by the Confucian-inspired Yuan Emperor Renzong. Zhao was a member of the "Academy of Worthies".

He was married to Guan Daosheng, who was also an accomplished poet, painter and calligrapher. His rejection of the refined, gentle brushwork of his era in favour of the cruder style of the eighth century is considered to have brought about a revolution that created the modern Chinese landscape painting. He was known for his paintings of horses. His landscapes are also considered to be done in a style that focuses more on a literal laying of ground. Rather than organizing them in a foreground, middle ground, and background pattern he layers middle grounds at various heights to create a sense of depth. This pattern of organization makes his paintings appear very simple and approachable. It was this characteristic that so many people valued about his style.

One of his most celebrated landscape paintings is exhibited at the Princeton University Art Museum with the title “The Mind Landscape of Xie Youyu” (幼輿丘壑), an allusion to the nature-loving scholar-official Xie Youyu (280–322). However, in 2019 Dutch scholar Lennert Gesterkamp argued that the colophon attached to the painting and mentioning Xie Youyu is a forgery, and that in fact Zhao Mengfu's intention was to honor his own spiritual master, Daoist scholar Du Daojian (1237–1318), who also celebrated nature.

Zhao Mengfu had several sons with his wife Guan Daosheng. His second son, Zhao Yong, also became a famous painter and calligrapher. He was also the maternal grandfather of Wang Meng, another famous painter. Zhao Mengfu was related to the later Ming dynasty literary figure Zhao Yiguang and his son Zhao Jun.

== Paintings ==
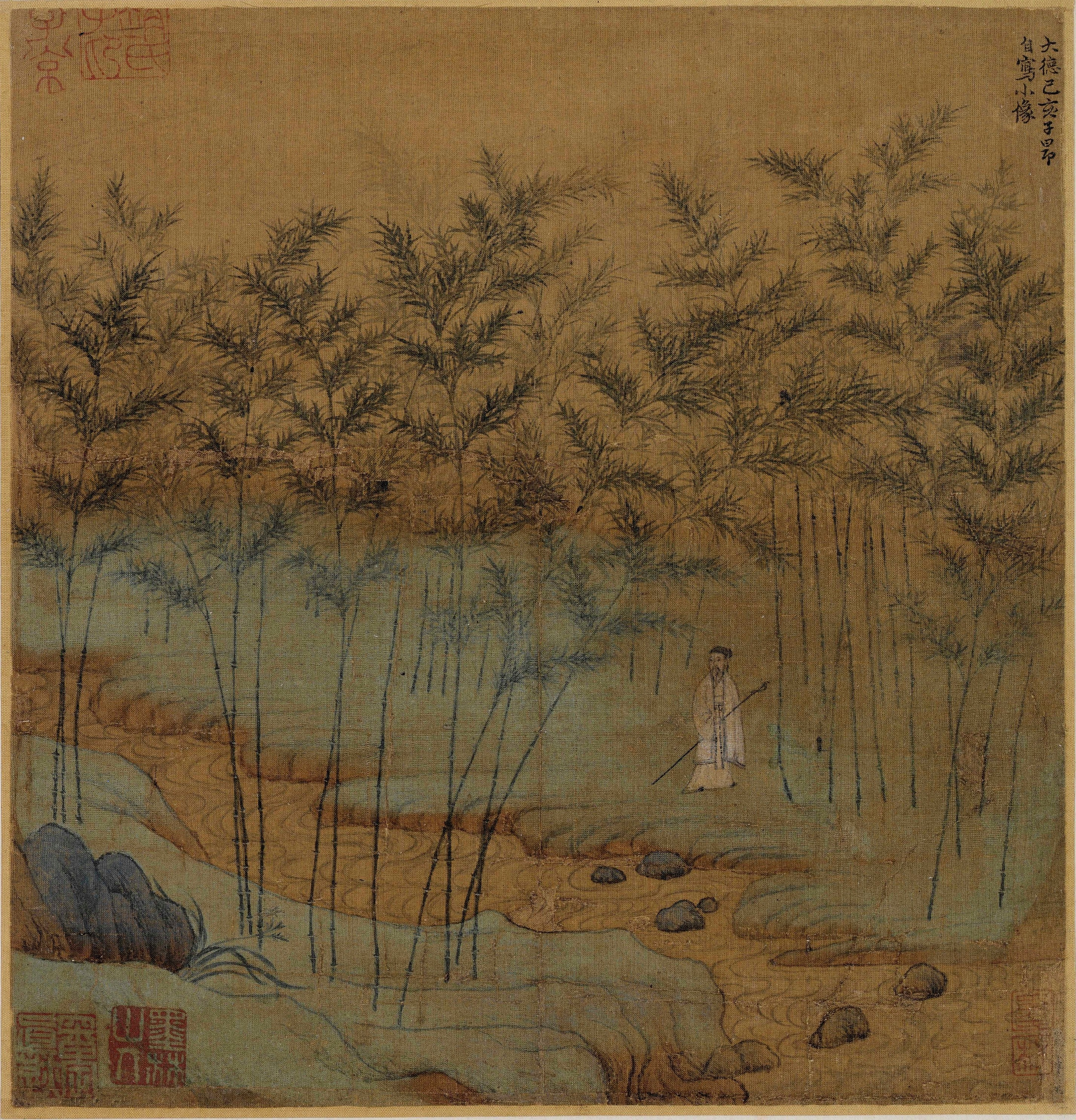
Self portrait of Zhao Mengfu, 1299

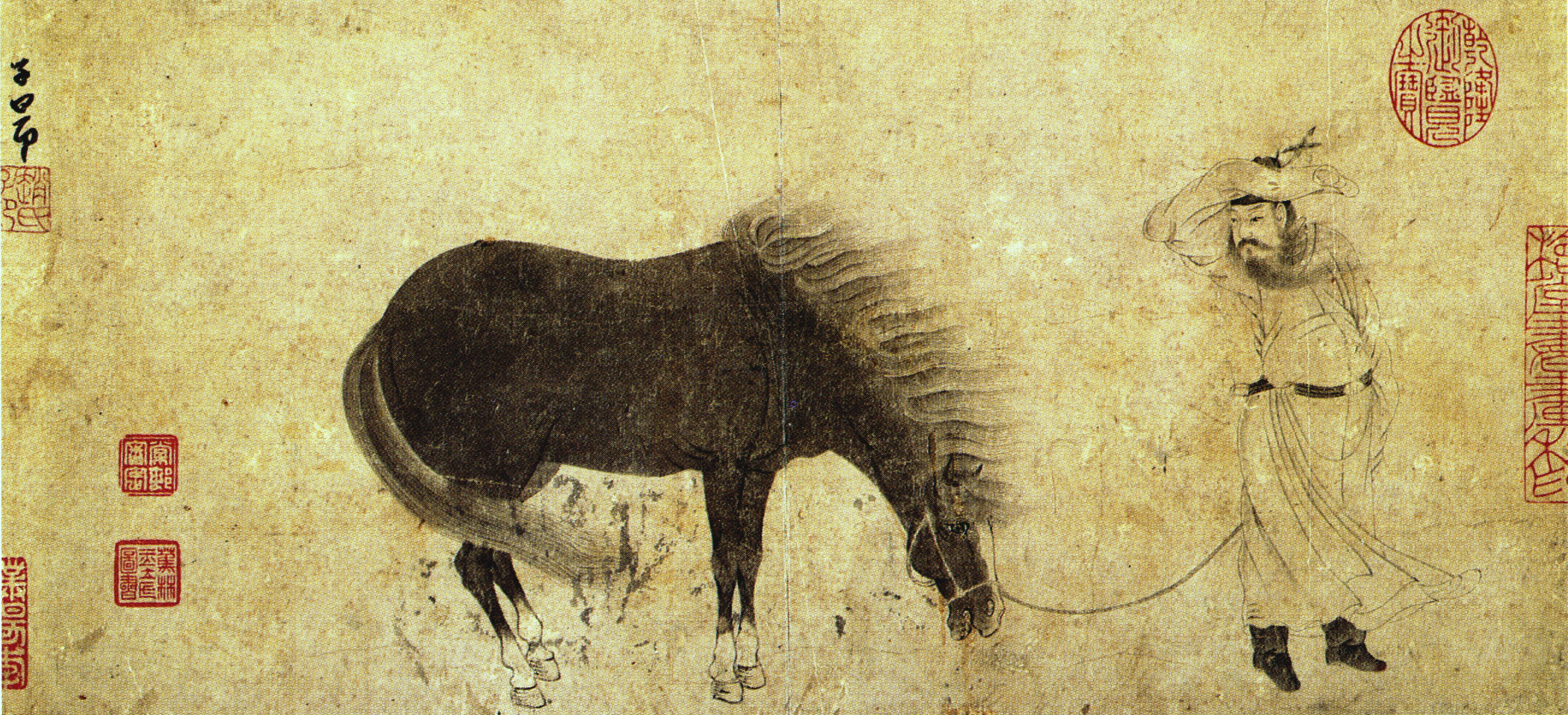
A Man and His Horse in the Wind

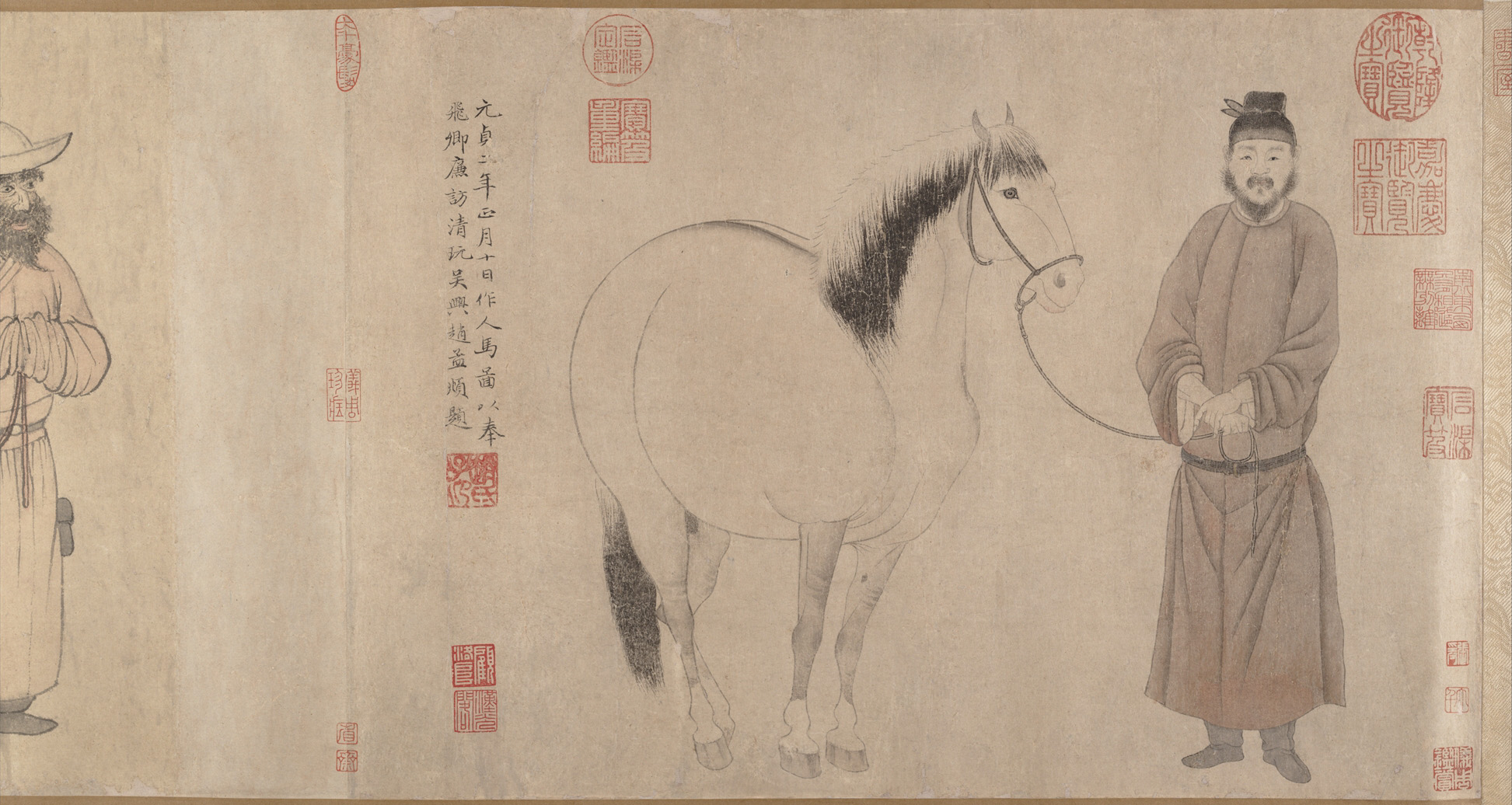
Horse and Groom

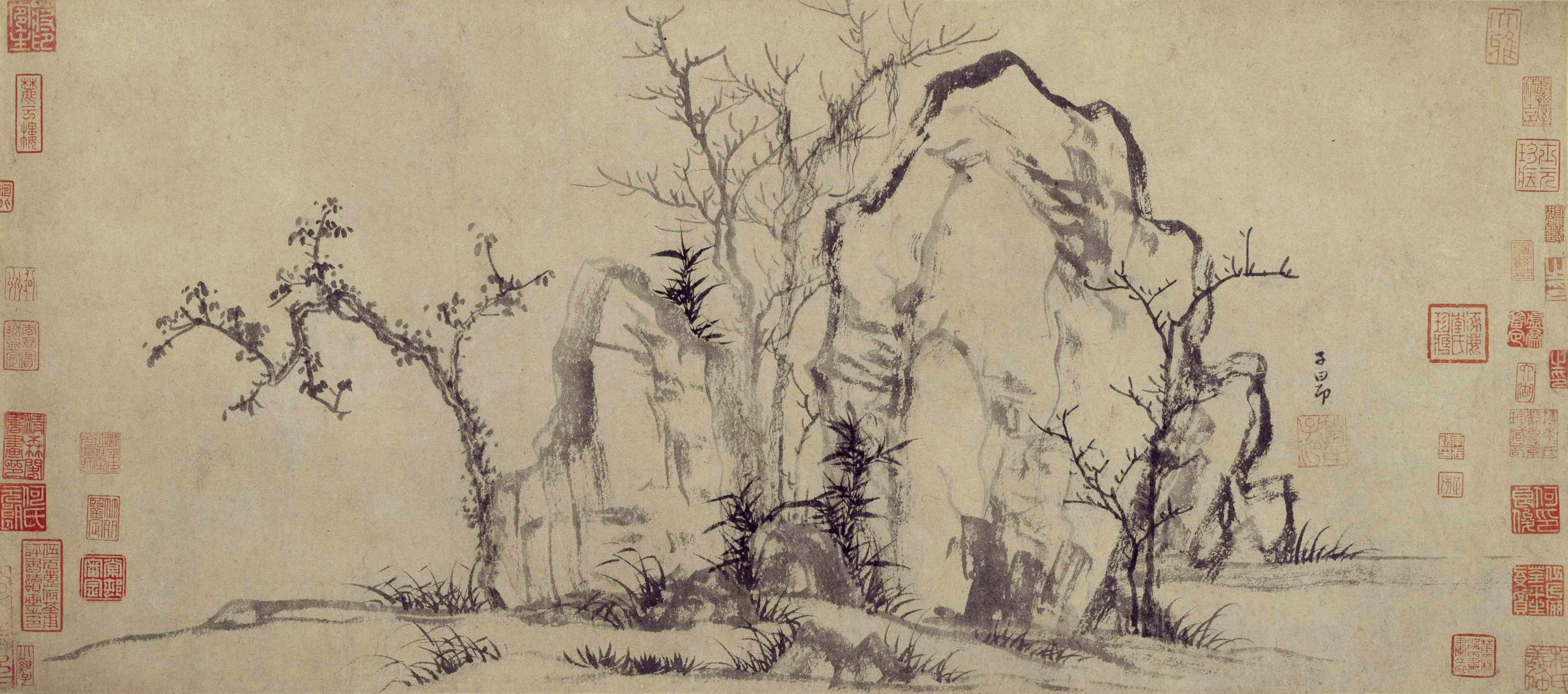
Elegant Rocks and Sparse Trees

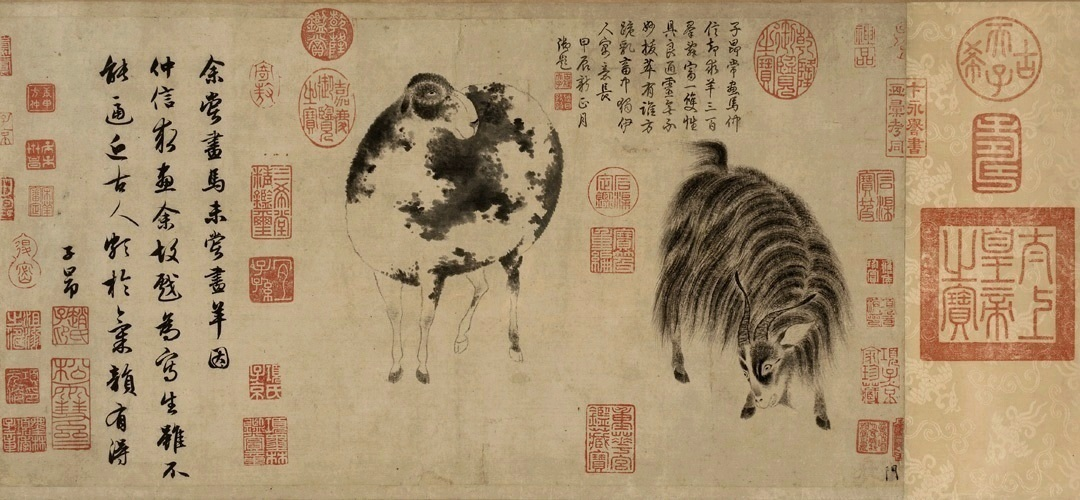
A Sheep and Goat

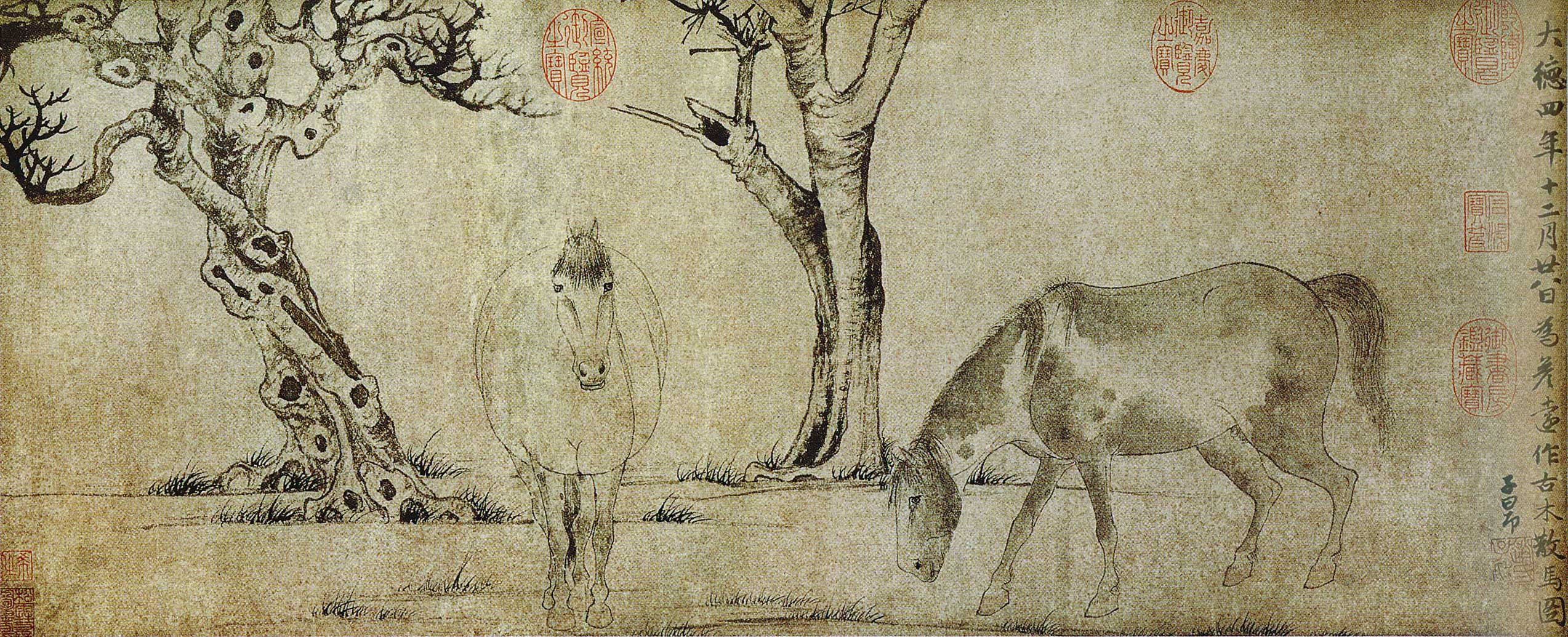
Old Tree and Horses

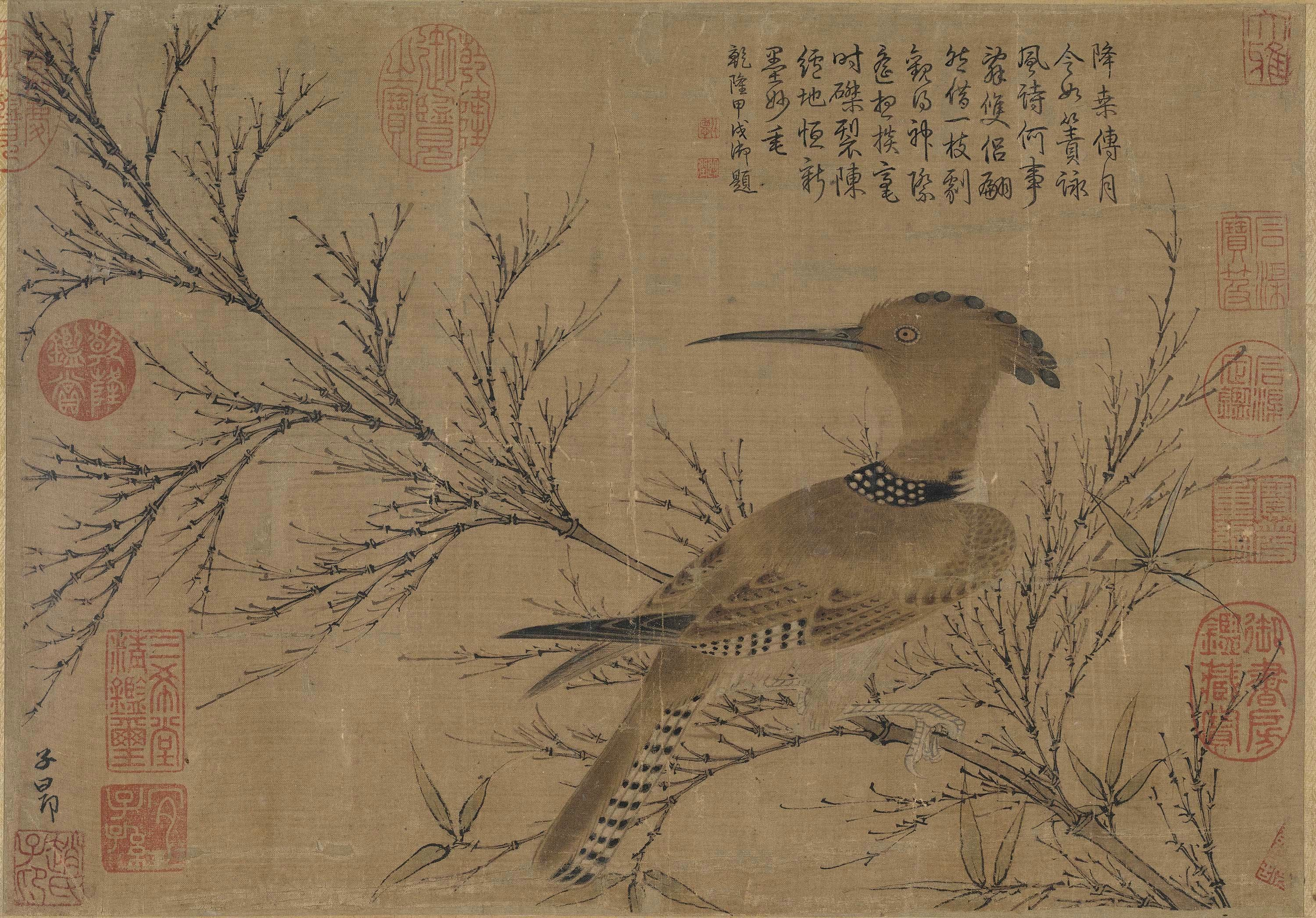
Hoopoe on Bamboo

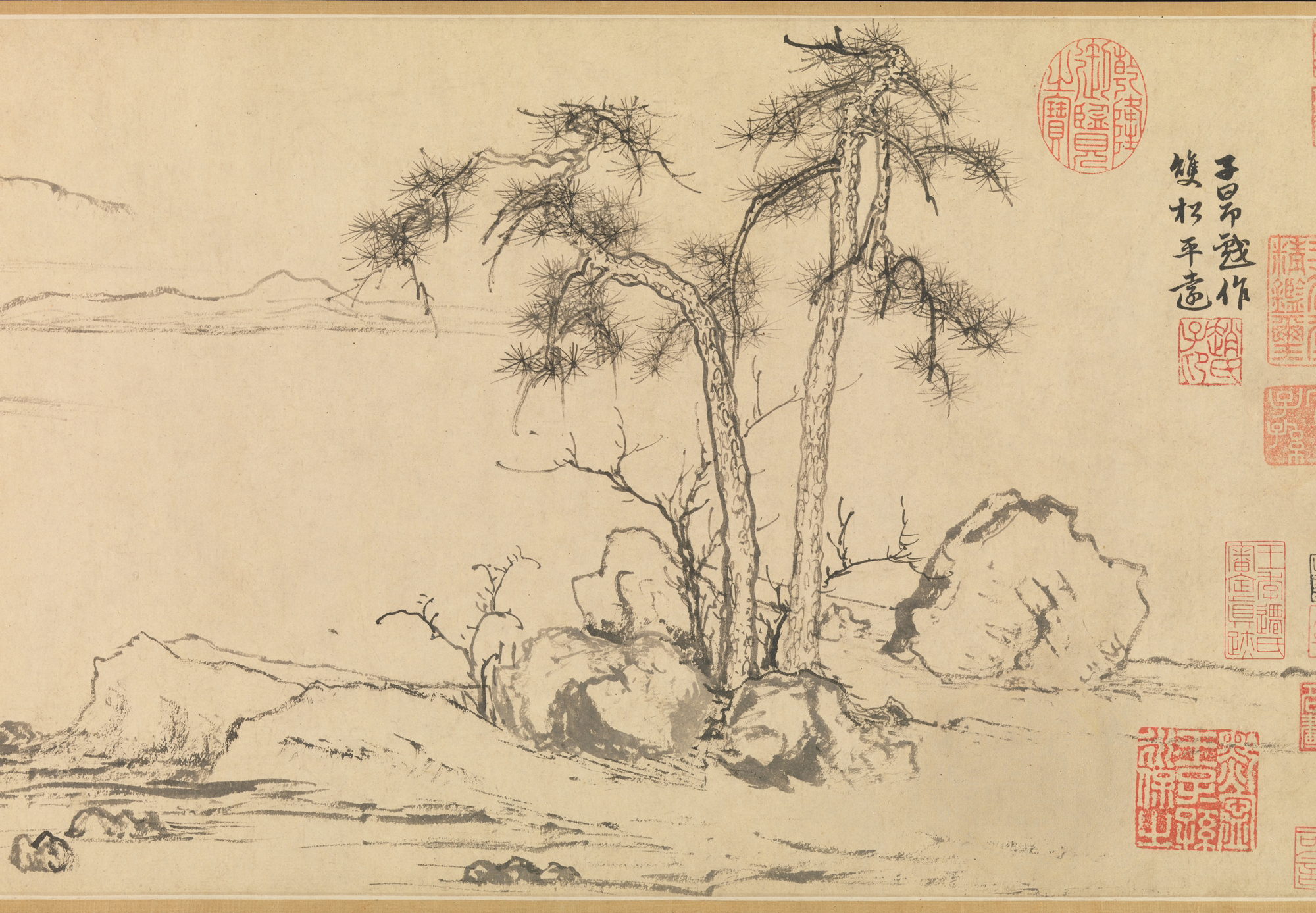
Twin Pines, Level Distance
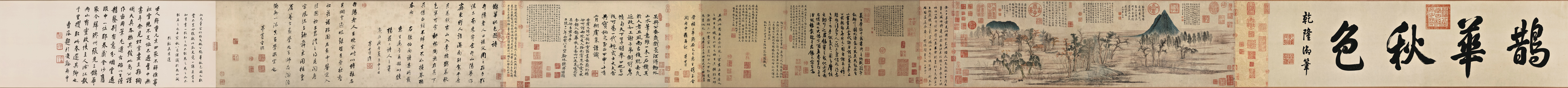
Autumn Colors on the Que and Hua Mountains
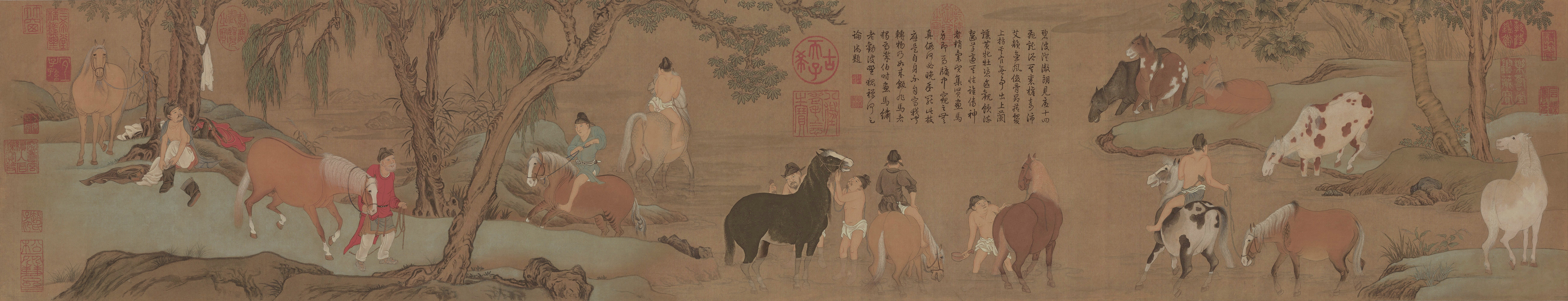
Bathing Horses
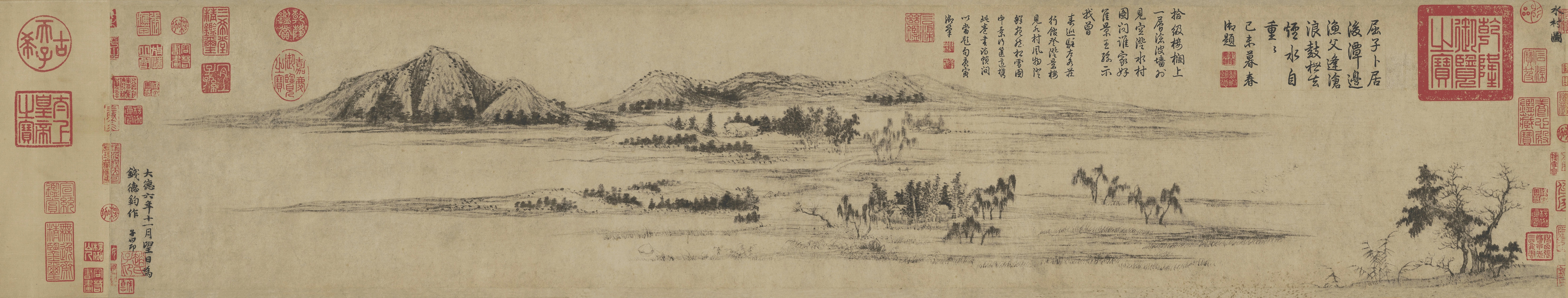
Water Village, ink on paper, handscroll, dated 1302 (24.9 x 120.5 cm); Palace Museum, Beijing

== Calligraphic works ==
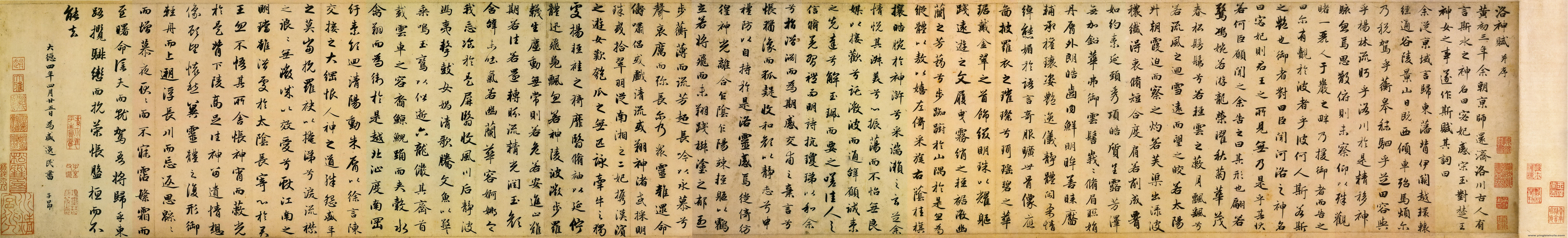
Tale of the Goddess of Luo River (洛神赋)
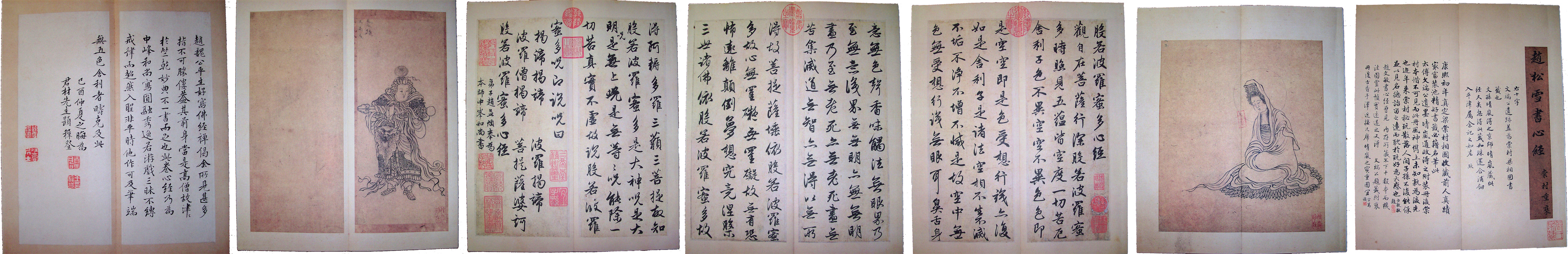
The Heart Sutra (赵孟頫书心经墨迹)
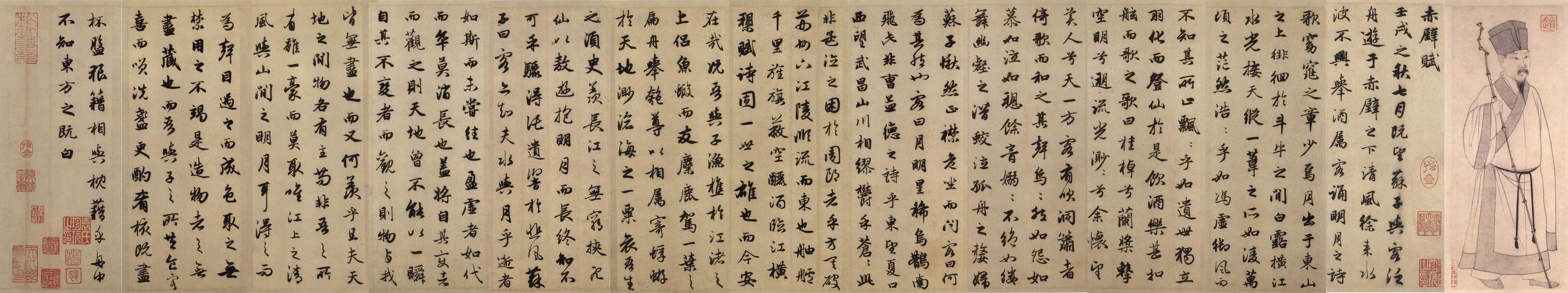
The First Ode on the Red Cliff (前赤壁赋)

== Legacy ==
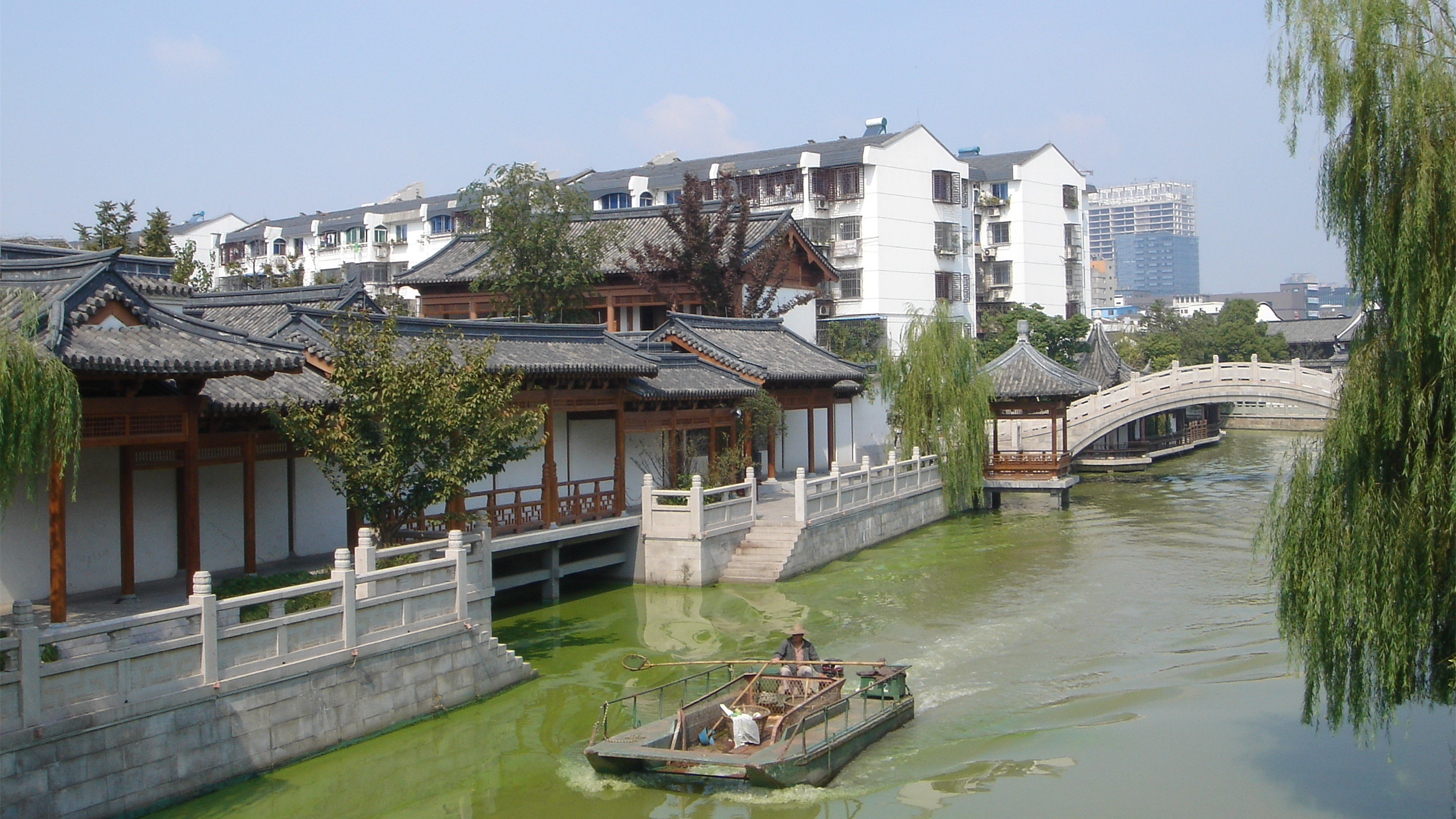
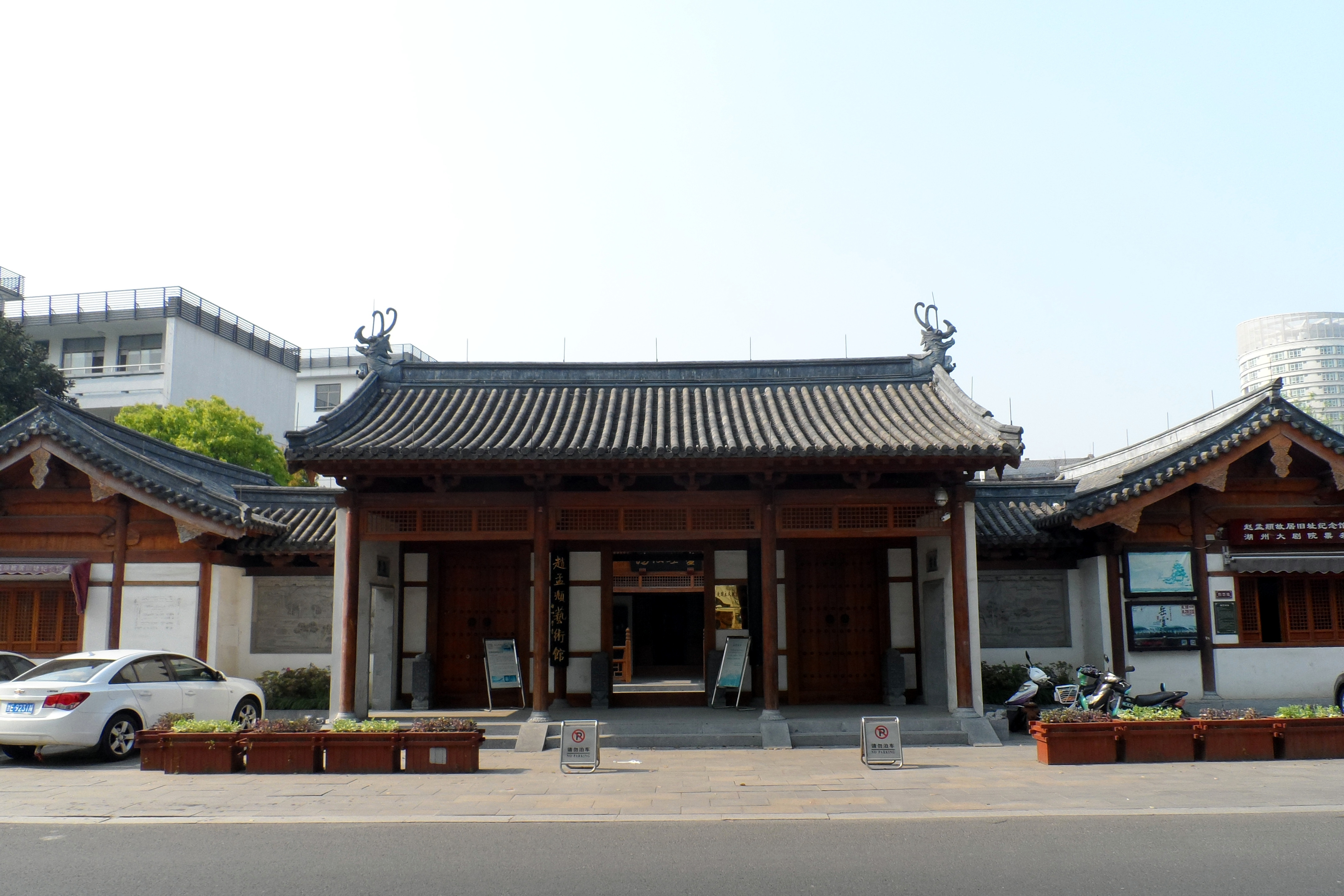
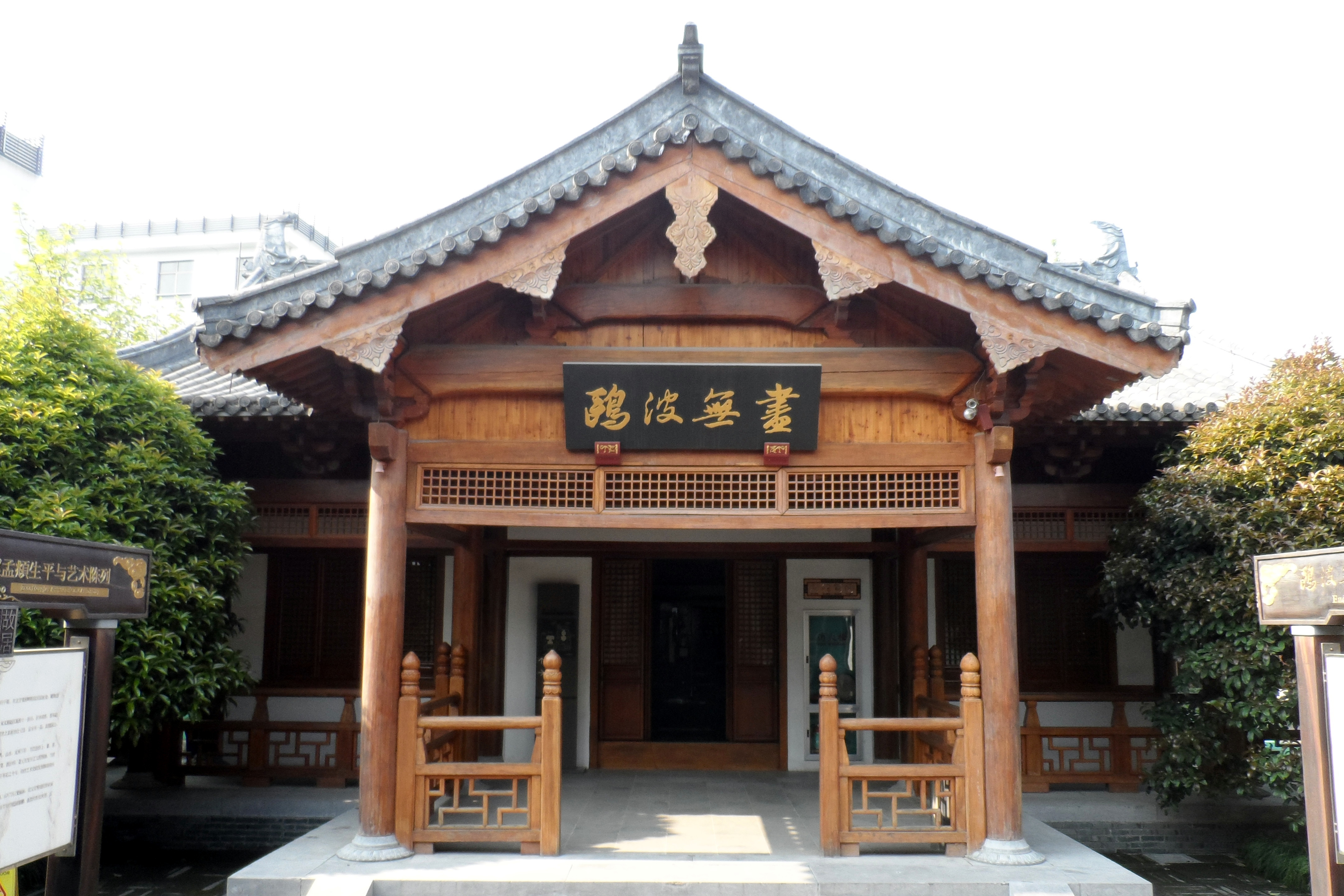
The Museum of Zhao Mengfu

The former residence of Zhao Mengfu in Huzhou, Zhejiang province has been restored into a museum, and opened to public since 2012.

A 167 kilometer diameter crater on Mercury (132.4° west, 87.3° south) was named the "Chao Meng-Fu crater" in memorial of him.

== Genealogy ==
- Zhao Kuangyin
- Zhao Defang
- Zhao Weixian
- Zhao Congyu
- Zhao Shijiang
- Zhao Linghua
- Zhao Zicheng
- Zhao Bogui
- Zhao Shichui
- Zhao Xiyan
- Zhao Yuyin
- Zhao Mengfu

== See also ==
- Hanlin Academy
- House of Zhao
- Yuan poetry
