= 1238 in poetry =

The following events are associated with the year 1238 AD in poetry.

== Births ==
- Yao Sui, writer of Chinese Sanqu poetry and an official (died 1313)
- Homam-e Tabrizi born either 1238 or 1239, Persian poet of the Ilkhanid era (died 1314)

== Deaths ==
- Elazar Rokeach, a Talmudist, Cabalist, moralist, scientist and poet (born 1176)
- Sighvatr Sturluson, skaldic poet, goði and member of the Icelandic Sturlungar clan (born 1170)
- Awhad al-Din Kermani (probably 21 March), Persian Sufi poet
