= Guan Daosheng =

Chinese artist and poet (1262–1319)

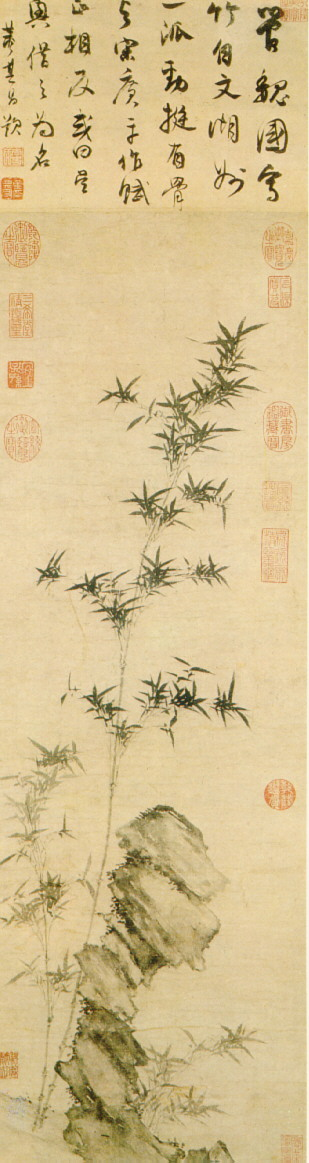
Bamboo and Stone (竹石图), Guan Daosheng, ink on paper, National Palace Museum, Taipei

Guan Daosheng, also known as Guan Zhongji or Lady Zhongji (her courtesy name) (Chinese: 管道昇; Wade–Giles: Kuan Tao-sheng; 字仲姬；1262–1319), was a Chinese painter and poet who was active during the early Yuan dynasty. She is credited with being "the most famous female painter and calligrapher in the Chinese history...remembered not only as a talented woman, but also as a prominent figure in the history of bamboo painting." She is also a well-known poet in the Yuan dynasty.

== Life ==
She was born into a landed family in Huzhou, which is believed to be descended from the high-ranking Wuxing official Guan Zhong. Guan grew up on her family's ancestral lands, nicknamed "The Roost of the Esteemed," and was a well-educated and highly talented child. Her father thought very highly of her, seeing her as an exceptional child as soon as she was born; hence the name Guan Daosheng, translating to "Way of Righteousness Rising as the Sun".

In 1286, at age 24, Guan married Zhao Mengfu, a renowned scholar-official and artist often considered the greatest artist of the earlier Yuan period. Guan and Zhao established a home in Wuxing "with the purchase of a town house with gardens in Huzhou, and a country retreat at Dongheng village near Deqing," where they were later buried.Guan and Zhao had two sons and two daughters together, who were raised alongside the son and four daughters Zhao had with his previous wife, who died prior to his marriage to Guan. Following the founding of the Yuan Dynasty in 1279, Kublai Khan sought for the Chinese scholars to serve at his royal court. Zhao was one of the scholars selected, and he was considered not only a great artist but also as "a versatile man of letters" who recorded the emperor's activities. Zhao's presence, in turn, gave Guan the opportunity to display her own talent and gain renown. Because of Zhao's work for the Imperial court, the two traveled widely, giving Guan the opportunity to meet leading artists of the era and see places upper-class women usually did not have access to. She would especially join Zhao on trips between the northern capital at Dadu and the southern cultural center of Huangzhou, most notably a three-year trip to Dadu in the year of their marriage.

Both Guan and Zhao "harbored deep Chan Buddhist faith and enjoyed friendship with monks, such as their teacher Zhongfeng Mingben and others residing in the monasteries on the Tianmu Mountains, close to their homes in Wuxing and Deqing in northern Zhejiang...."

Guan died in 1319 at the age of 58 after a long illness. She died "on board the official boat in Shandong on the way home"; her husband had sought permission to return due to his wife's illness. "The text of his letter informing [a relative] of her death and his painful journey home with her coffin, known as 'Zuimeng tie' ('Alcoholic delirium'), portrays a man devastated by the loss." Because some of her husband's writings focused on his dislike of northern China's climate where they lived, "it may even [have] been that a meagre northern diet contributed to [her] death...possibly of beriberi brought on by malnutrition." In the three years he lived after her death, it is said that Zhao painted mainly bamboo, one of Guan's favourite subjects, in her memory. Today, their "town house and garden in Huzhou, Lianhuazhuang, and their tomb in the country at Dongheng have been restored" and a small museum has been built in her husband's honour.

== Artistic career and style ==
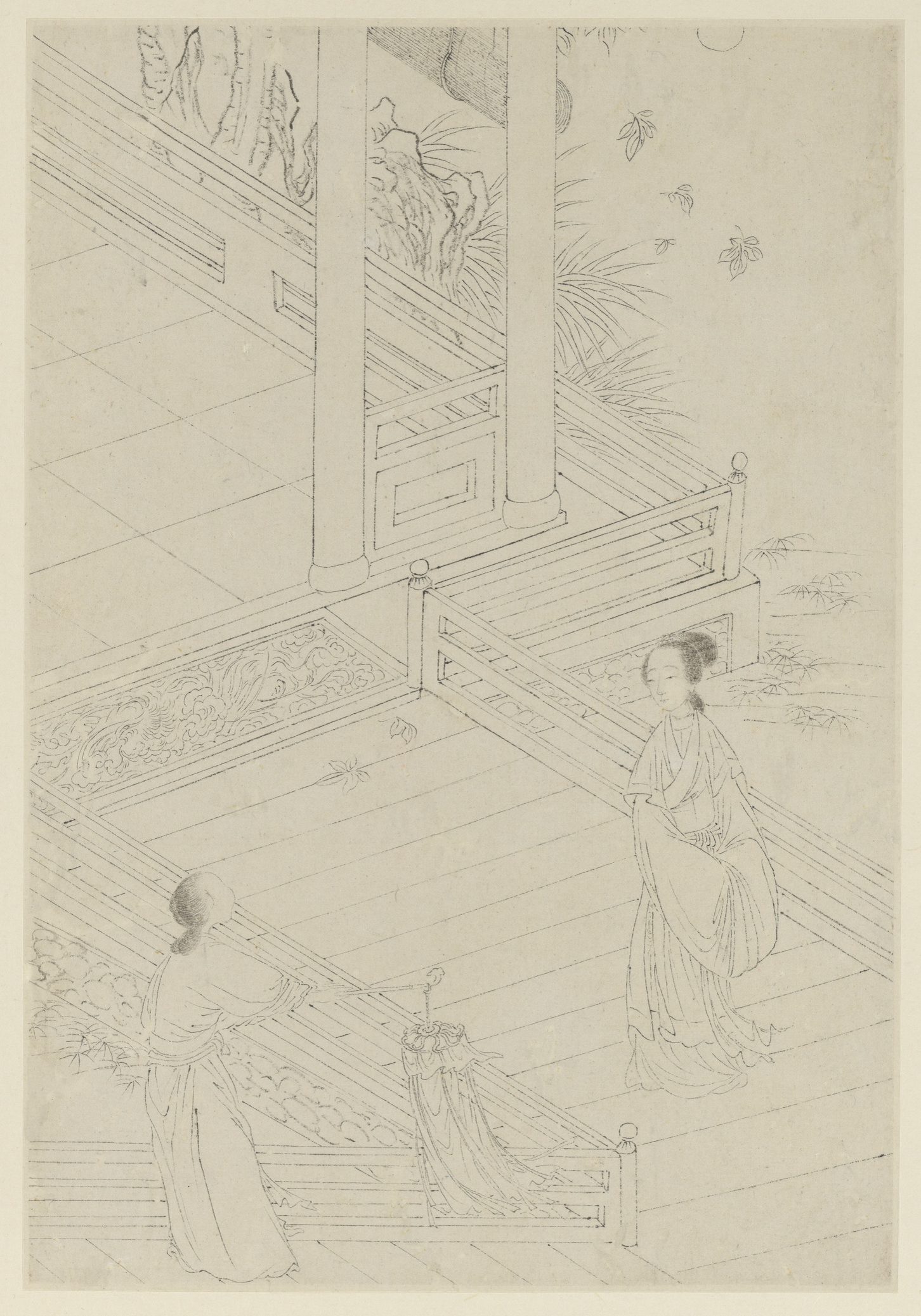
Zhongji's audience in the inner court, as depicted in the album Famous Women painted by Gai Qi, 1799 (The Metropolitan Museum of Art)

Guan appears to have become active as a painter around 1296 and as a calligrapher in 1299. She was talented in calligraphy and painting ink bamboo and plum with delicate and elegant strokes. It is believed that she and her husband did paintings together. Her calligraphy and that of her husband and one of their three sons, Zhao Yong, were collected in a scroll by the Yuan Emperor Ayurbarwada (better known as the Emperor Ren). He commented that it was a rare thing for a husband, wife and son to all be talented in calligraphy. "The imperial seal was applied to these works and they became part of the Imperial Archives collection."

The focus of Guan's work on bamboo painting was atypical for a female artist, as the subject was thought to be imbued with highly desirable masculine qualities, namely its ability to bend without breaking and greenness through the winter, symbolic of steadfast companionship. She is also believed to have depicted bodies of water alongside bamboo in her work in order to add more feminine associations to the plant. A bamboo scroll of hers from 1301 was found in her husband's studio, obviously showing her knowledge on the discourse surrounding bamboo being depicted by a woman; the scroll confidently stated: "To play with brush and ink is masculine sort of thing to do, yet I made this painting. Wouldn't someone say that I have transgressed? How despicable; how despicable."

Guan's paintings of bamboo garnered extensive praise, most notably among critics who noted their surprise at their strong, masculine brushstrokes that, according to such critics, did not betray the fact that a woman had made them. Praise such as this undoubtedly helped lead to Guan's 1317 reception of the title "Madam of the Wei Kingdom" from the imperial court in the capital. Indeed, some of Guan's works received the imperial seal of Emperor Renzong and his sister, Grand Princess Sengge Ragi, and were housed in the collection of the imperial archives. The emperor commissioned Guan to copy the famous Thousand Character Classic. Her work became popular at court, and many women of the aristocracy commissioned pieces from her as well. She also painted Buddhist murals for Yuan temples.

The greatest contribution of Guan Daosheng to the genre of bamboo painting was her tendency to paint it as part of a landscape, as opposed to isolated branches that were pressed close to the picture plane. As seen in Bamboo Groves in Mist and Rain, attributed to Guan, the bamboo itself is painted as part of the thickets in which it naturally grows, and it is seen as subject to the effects of the landscape and atmosphere in which it is located. This style followed the tradition of an artist of the early Yuan whose name goes unrecorded in China but who is called Tan Zhirui in Japan, where his paintings were brought by Chan Buddhist monks. The ink tonality does not vary much in these works by Guan, as the entirety of the subject matter is affected by the misty atmosphere in which it is portrayed.

She inscribed poems on her paintings and used a style of poetry that was used rarely by women. In her poems she shows concern for her husband and children, but does this in a humoristic way. When her husband once considered taking a concubine, and wrote a short poem assuring her that he was just contemplating what his friends were doing and she would still be the official wife, she wrote a short poem in response ("Song of You and Me") and left it where he could find it. The subject was reportedly never raised again and after her death, he did not remarry.

It is likely that many of Guan's works were dedicated to high-ranking female patrons. Beyond her association with Sengge Ragi, it is known that Guan dedicated Bamboo Groves in Mist and Rain to a "Lady Chuguo." By commonly directing her works to female recipients, Guan may have been promoting the influence of women at the imperial court.

== Poetry ==
She wrote a poem called "Song of Me and You" in response to her husband's desire to have concubines, a common practice in China during that time, especially for those who worked in the government or high-ranking officers. In addition, she further wrote a poem called "Married Love" before her death. Her husband later found this piece of poem and decided not to marry a third time.

In "Married Love," it reads, "You and I have so much love, that it burns like a fire [...]. In life we share a single quilt, in death we share a single coffin.

== Legacy ==
She is referred to "in the nineteenth century compilation of information on woman painters drawn from many earlier sources by T'ang Sou-yu, the wife of the Hangchow scholar and book collector Wang Yuan-sun" and is "one of the few women who is mentioned in early Western surveys of Chinese painting and whose work has been studied by modern Chinese scholars." Few of her paintings remain but one example in the National Palace Museum in Taipei is believed to have a "plausible claim to authenticity"; it is a monochrome handscroll painted in 1308 entitled Bamboo Clumps in Mist and Rain. "Most of Guan Daosheng's scroll paintings appear to have been done for other women of roughly equal status--either her relatives or the wives of her husband's colleagues...."

After death, Daosheng's tombstone was marked the same as one who would be buried as a feudal lord, giving her high honor.

In 2006, Guan's poetry served as the inspiration for a series of paintings by contemporary artist Au Hoi Lam, which were displayed at the Hong Kong Central Library in an exhibition entitled When Words are Sweet...Paintings by Au Hoi-lam.
