= 1216 in poetry =

== Births ==
- Zahed Gilani (died 1301), Persian Sufi

== Deaths ==
- Kamo no Chōmei (born 1155), Japanese author, poet (waka), and essayist
- Shota Rustaveli (born 1172), Georgian poet

== See also ==
- Poetry
- List of years in poetry
