= Zhao Yiguang =

Zhao Yiguang (Chinese: 趙宧光; pinyin: Zhào Yíguāng; 1559–1625) was a Chinese writer who lived during the Ming dynasty.

His wife was Lu Qingzi, another famous writer, they were intellectuals and members of the gentry. Zhao patronized his wife's books with his money. Zhao Yiguang and Lu had a son, Zhao Jun, who married Wen Congjian's daughter, who was also from a gentry family and literati who wrote poems. The earlier painter Zhao Mengfu was part of their branch of the Song royal family.

Two of his works are housed in the Wang qishu; they were titled the Jiuhuan shitu 九圜史圖 and the Liuhe mantu 六匌曼圖. They were part of the Siku Quanshu Cunmu Congshu 四庫全書存目叢書.

== See also ==
- House of Zhao
- Song dynasty
- Zhao Mengfu
