= 1243 in poetry =

This article covers 1243 in poetry.

== Events ==
- Adam de Givenchi named as a priest and chaplain to the Bishop of Arras.

== Births ==
- Lu Zhi (died 1315), Chinese writer and poet of the Yuan dynasty
- Roger-Bernard III of Foix (died 1302), the Count of Foix, poet and troubadour
