= 1295 in poetry =

This article covers 1295 in poetry.

== Works ==
- Dante, La Vita Nuova (published)
- Mathieu of Boulogne, Liber lamentationum Matheoluli (The Lamentations of Matheolus) (written)

== Deaths ==
- Pai Gomes Charinho (born 1225), Galician admiral, poet and troubadour
