= 1241 in poetry =

== Events ==
- Peire Bremon Ricas Novas and Sordello attack each other in a string of sirventes.

== Births ==
- Asukai Gayu (died 1301), Japanese waka poet

== Deaths ==
- September 22 – Snorri Sturluson (born 1178), Icelandic poet
- September 26 – Fujiwara no Teika 藤原定家, also known as "Fujiwara no Sadaie" or "Sada-ie" (born 1162), a widely venerated, Japanese waka poet and (for centuries) extremely influential critic; also a scribe, scholar and extremely influential anthologist of the late Heian period and early Kamakura period; the Tale of Matsura is generally attributed to him; son of Fujiwara no Shunzei
