= 1248 in poetry =

This article covers 1248 in poetry.

== Events ==
- Lanfranc Cigala writes Quan vei far bon fag plazentier bemoaning the state of the Church.
- Japanese Retired Emperor Go-Saga orders a new imperial anthology of waka poems; compiled by Fujiwara no Tameie, the new anthology, titled Shokugosen Wakashū' 続後撰和歌集 ("Later Collection Continued"), would be finished three years later, in 1251.

== Births ==
- Gao Kegong (died 1310), Chinese painter and poet
- Muḥammad Ibn Dāniyāl (died 1310), Arab playwright and poet

== Deaths ==
- Shams Tabrizi (born 1185), Persian Sufi

== See also ==
- 13th century in poetry
- List of years in poetry
