= 1225 in poetry =

This article covers 1225 in poetry.

== Works ==
- Approximate date
  - Francis of Assisi, Laudes creaturarum or Cantico delle creature ("Praise of God's creation", the oldest known Italian poetry)
  - King Horn, the oldest known English verse romance

== Births ==
- Paio Gomes Charinho (died 1295), poet and troubadour
- Guan Hanqing (died 1302), Chinese playwright and poet in the Yuan Dynasty
- Shem-Tov ibn Falaquera (died 1290), Hebrew poet in Al-Andalus

== Deaths ==
- Jien (born 1155), Japanese poet, historian, and Buddhist monk

== See also ==
- Poetry
- List of years in poetry
