= 1251 in poetry =

== Works published ==
- Fujiwara no Tameie, editor, Shokugosen Wakashū' 続後撰和歌集 ("Later Collection Continued"), an imperial anthology of Japanese waka poetry, finished three years after Retired Emperor Go-Saga ordered it in 1248; consists of 20 volumes containing 1,368 poems

== Deaths ==
- Ibn Sahl of Seville (born 1212), Arabic language Moorish poet of Andalusia (approximate date)
