= 1232 in poetry =

This article covers 1232 in poetry.

== Births ==
- Ramon Llull (died 1315), Catalan writer and philosopher (born 1232 or 1233)
