= Zhao Yong (painter) =

Chinese painter, calligrapher and poet

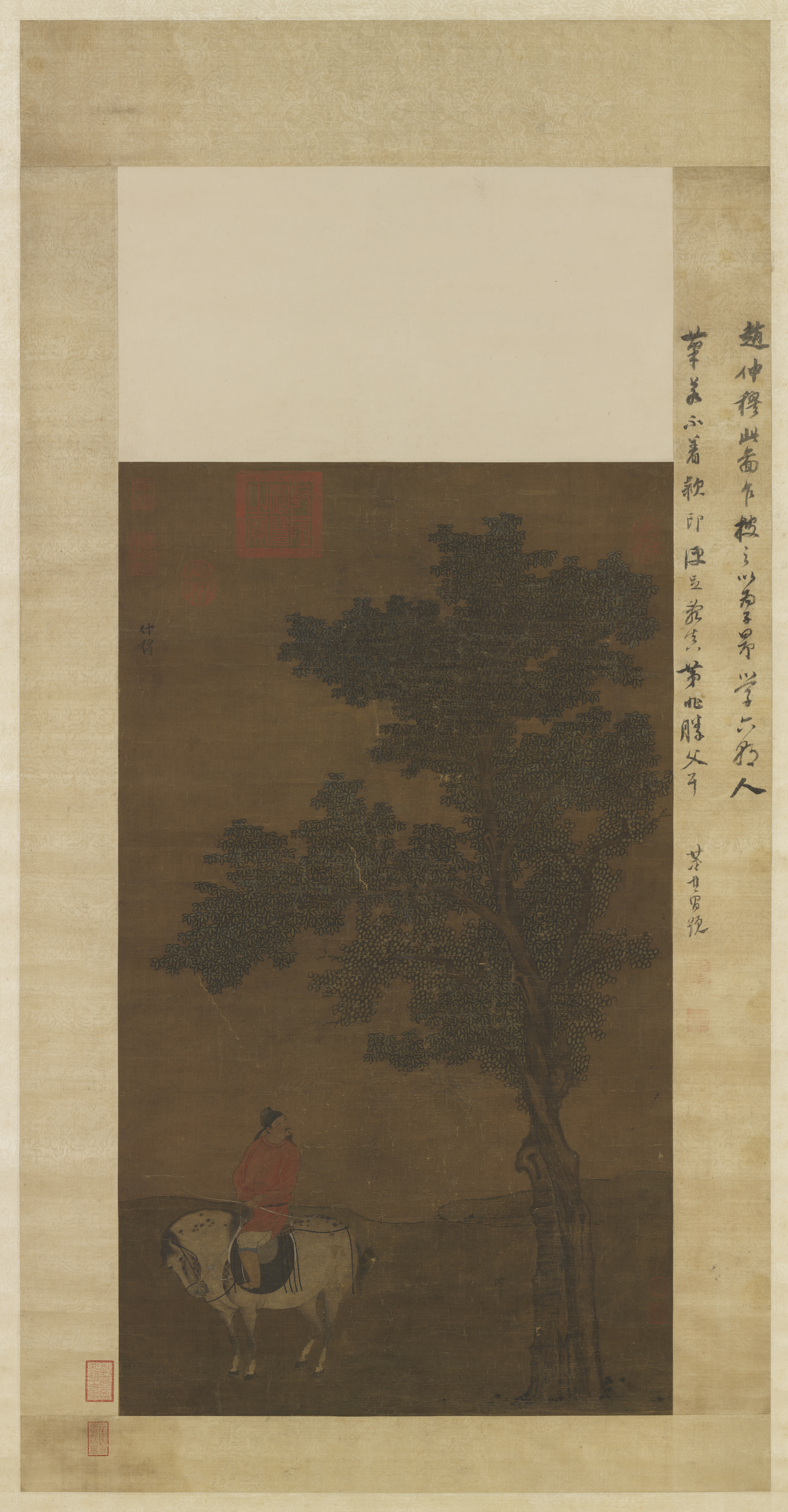
Zhao Yong, A Ride in Spring, National Palace Museum, Taipei

Zhao Yong (simplified Chinese: 赵雍; traditional Chinese: 趙雍; pinyin: Zhào Yōng; Wade–Giles: Chao Yung; style name Zhongmu (仲穆); 1289 – c. 1360), was a Chinese painter, calligrapher, and poet in the Yuan Dynasty. A native of Wuxing (吳興， now Huzhou (湖州) in Zhejiang Province), he was the second son of Zhao Mengfu. Zhao was a descendant of the Song Imperial family, the House of Zhao.

Zhao became a high official with his father's assistance. Following the style of Dong Yuan and Li Cheng, he had a talent for painting human figures, landscapes, and horses with saddle.

== Genealogy ==
- Zhao Kuangyin
- Zhao Defang
- Zhao Weixian
- Zhao Congyu
- Zhao Shijiang
- Zhao Linghua
- Zhao Zicheng
- Zhao Bogui
- Zhao Shichui
- Zhao Xiyan
- Zhao Yuyin
- Zhao Mengfu
- Zhao Yong
