= Folquet de Lunel =

Folquet de Lunel (c. 1244 – c. 1300) was a troubadour from Lunel (in the modern Hérault) in the Languedoc. He left behind nine recorded lyric poems, including five cansos, two partimens, and two sirventes. He also wrote one longer work, the Romans de mondana vida. Folquet's birth date can be known precisely because he tells us in his Romans, written in 1284, that he was forty years old at the time.

Folquet's earliest datable work is a partimen with Guiraut Riquier, dated to between 1264 and 1270. He presents Guiraut with a tricky question:

Guirautz, don'ab beutat granda
tota sol'aiatz
en un lieg, e selh que.l platz
jatz n'en autre, ses demanda
que l'us a l'autre no fai,
et amo.s de cor verai:
si.l cavaliers se lev'a lieys jazer
o ilh ab lui, cal li deu mais plazer?

Folquet, along with fellow troubadours Dalfinet and Cerverí de Girona, was in Spain in 1269 in the entourage of infante Peter. They accompanied Peter to Toledo, where he treated with Alfonso X of Castile. On 26 April at Riello, near Cuenca, on the way, Folquet was charged with distributing pay to the three: three solidi each for himself and Dalfinet and one solidus for Cerverí. His meeting with Alfonso X inspired Folquet, already a staunch Ghibelline, to write a sirventes in support of Alfonso's claim to the Holy Roman Empire. Al bon rey q'es reys de pretz car was usually dated to 1269, but is more likely to have been written later, between February 1271, when Pope Gregory X arrived in Rome, and September 1273, when Rudolf of Habsburg was elected King of Germany, since the sirventes mentions a pope (there had been a vacancy since 1268) and does not mention Rudolf's claim to the Empire. The most probable date is August/September 1273. The sirventes defends the attempts of Alfonso to receive his crown, advocates for the freedom of Henry of Castile (the imprisoned by the Guelphs), and lends support to Aragones political ambitions in Italy. Like both his contemporaries Cerverí de Girona and Paulet de Marselha, Folquet had nothing but praise for Peter, James his father, and the Aragonese. The metre of the sirventes is copied from the work Bel m'es ab motz leugiers a far by Sordello. Cerverí in his Cobla en sis lengatges copied the same metre, either from Sordello or Folquet.

At some point during the ongoing Guelph-Ghibelline conflict Folquet travelled into Lombardy, where he heard firsthand of the popularity of Alfonso:

Qu'entre.ls lombartz ausi contar que l'alaman e.l bromanso e.l roman, ses contrastar, volon a lui la lectio de l'Emperi; e Milan e Pavia, Cremona et Ast e ginoes an gran cor quel bon rey castellan recebran a gran honor, si ven en Lombardia.	When among the Lombards I heard that the Germans and the Brabançons and the Romans, without disagreement, wish for his election to the Empire; and Milan and Pavia, Cremona and Asti and the Genoese have a great desire the good Castilian king to receive in grand honour, if he ever comes to Lombardy.

Folquet had returned to Lunel by 1274. There he entered into relations with Henry II of Rodez, who was the dedicatee of his Romans. Three religious cansos may also have been dedicated to him: Dompna bona, bel'e plazens, Si quon la fuelh'el ramel, and Tant fin'amors totas horas m'afila. Indeed, a count of Rodez appears in the tornadas of both his religious and his (two) courtly love songs. Scholarship is divided over whether the intended count was Hugh IV, indicating that the songs are a product of Folquet's youth, or Henry II, making them a product of his maturity.

== Sources ==
- Riquer, Martín de. Los trovadores: historia literaria y textos. 3 vol. Barcelona: Planeta, 1975.
