= Guillaume Guiart =

French chronicler and poet

Guillaume Guiart (or Guiard) (died c. 1316) was a French chronicler and poet.

== Life ==
He was probably born at Orléans, and served in the French army in Flanders in 1304.

Having been disabled by a wound he began to write, lived at Arras and then in Paris, thus being able to consult the large store of manuscripts in the abbey of St Denis, including the Grandes chroniques de France. Afterwards he appears as a minestrel de bouche.

Guiart's poem Branche des Royaux lignages, was written and then rewritten between 1304 and 1307, in honour of the French king Philip IV, and in answer to the aspersions of a Flemish poet. Comprising over 21,000 verses it deals with the history of the French kings from the time of Louis VIII; but it is only really important for the period after 1296 and for the war in Flanders from 1301 to 1304, of which it gives a graphic account, and for which it is a high authority. It was first published by JA Buchon (Paris, 1828), and again in tome xxii. of the Recueil des historiens des Gaules et de la France (Paris, 1865).
