= Henry Bate of Mechelen =

Henry Bate or Hendrik Baten (of Mechelen or of Malines) a.k.a. Henricus Batenus (Mechliniensis) (Note: In all five languages that this English language Wikipedia inspected, the first name and family name may occur with or without mentioning his place of origin, and remarkably, apart from Dutch and rarely in Latin, the first name and origin can be found without his family name. In his native Dutch language and in German, the latter appears as either Baten or Bate; in French and English the latter spelling clearly prevails. Hence in these languages he is referred to as Hendrik Bate[n] [van Mechelen], Heinrich [Bate[n]] von Mecheln, Henri [Bate] de Malines, and Henry [Bate] of Mechelen respectively although in particular in English, the French translation of his birthplace is equally common: of Malines (and in German one very rarely finds de Malines and once von Malines). Texts in any language may show his Latinized name Henricus Batenus [Mechliniensis].) (24 March 1246 in Malines Mechelen – after 1310 in Tongerloo) was a Brabantian philosopher, theologian, astronomer, astrologer, poet, and musician.

He was Master of Arts of the University of Paris before 1274. He was a pupil of Thomas Aquinas, he became a canon and cantor of the Cathedral of Saint-Lambert, Liège before 1289.

As astronomer, he made astrolabes, and wrote Magistralis compositio astrolabii, dedicated to his friend William of Moerbeke. He drew up astronomical tables: the Tabule Mechlinenses, from around 1285–1295, and a 1290 work, De erroribus tabularum Alphonsi, which pointed out errors in the Alfonsine tables. While in Rome in 1292, he wrote commentaries on the astrological works of Abraham ibn Ezra and Albumasar.

He became tutor to Guy de Hainaut, brother of Count Jean d'Avesnes, for whom he wrote, between 1285 and 1305, a Speculum divinorum et quorundam naturalium (On the Unity of Natural).

Around 1309, he retired with the Premonstratensians of Tongerloo, where he ended his days.
