= Muḥammad Ibn Dāniyāl =

Medieval Arabic playwright and poet

Shams al-Dīn AbūʿAbdallāh Muḥammad Ibn Dāniyāl b. Yūsuf al-Khuzā ʿī al-Mawsịlī (1248 – c. 1311), commonly referred to as Muḥammad Ibn Dāniyāl, was an Arab poet and playwright who became well known in Egypt during the Middle Ages. His trilogy of shadow puppetry plays are the first from the medieval era to be translated from Arabic to English.

== Early life ==
Dāniyāl was born in 1248 in Mosul. Little is known about his family life, other than the fact that his father was illiterate. When he was a teenager, a Mongolian attack on the city forced him to immigrate to Cairo.

In his new city, he earned a living as an eye doctor, but it didn't take long before he gained a reputation as a writer and wit among the city's bohemian population.

== Career ==
For much of his career, Ibn Dāniyāl wrote celebratory maqama poems that honored the city's public figures and events.

His most studied works, the trilogy of plays for shadow puppetry, were written at the request of a friend who was frustrated by the genre's current state. The plays, entitled The Shadow Spirit, The Amazing Preacher and the Stranger, and The Love Stricken One and the One Who Inspires Passion were made available for scholarly study, particularly in the west, through the translations of Safi Mahfouz and Marvin Carlson.
