= Riello =

Coordinates: 43°08′N 6°05′W

- municipality
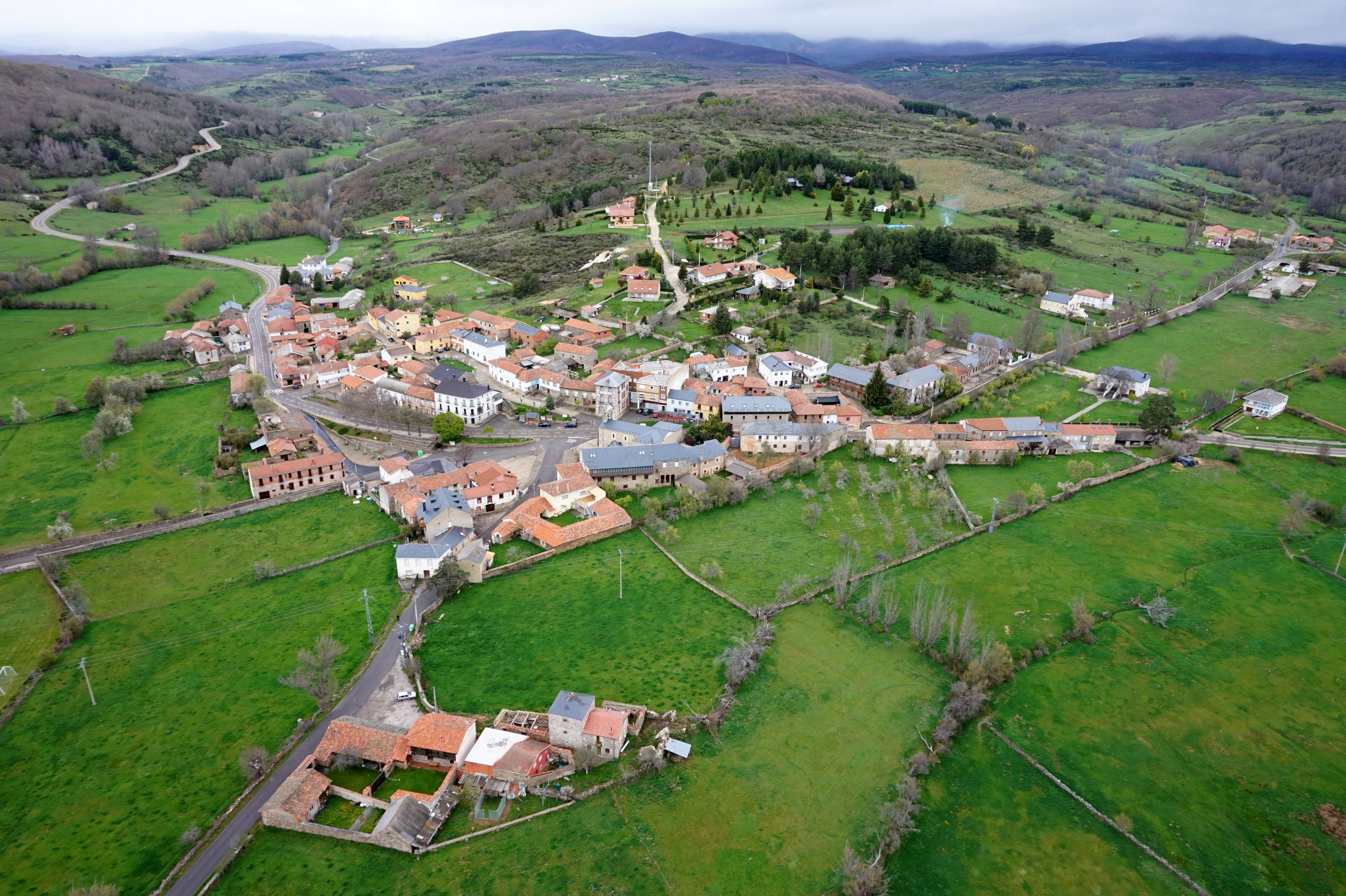
- Aerial view of Riello from south of the municipal

- Coat of arms
- Interactive map of Riello
- Country: Spain
- Autonomous community: Castile and León
- Province: León
- Municipality: Riello

Area
  - Total: 235 km^{2} (91 sq mi)

Population (2025-01-01)
  - Total: 570
  - Density: 2.4/km^{2} (6.3/sq mi)
- Time zone: UTC+1 (CET)
  - Summer (DST): UTC+2 (CEST)

Riello is a municipality located in the province of León, Castile and León, Spain. According to the 2004 census (INE), the municipality has a population of 864 inhabitants.
