= René of Chalon =

Prince of Orange from 1530 to 1544

René of Chalon, Prince of Orange
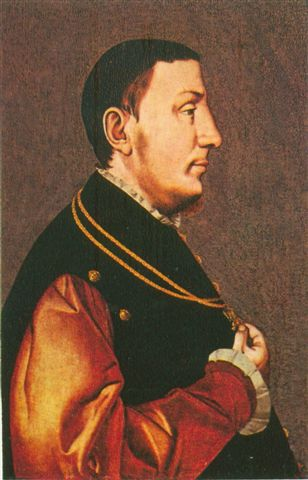
- René of Chalon

Prince of Orange
- Reign: 3 August 1530 – 15 July 1544
- Predecessor: Philibert
- Successor: William I
- Born: 5 February 1519; Breda, Duchy of Brabant
- Died: 15 July 1544 (aged 25); Saint-Dizier, Kingdom of France
- Buried: Grote Kerk (Breda)
- Noble family: Chalon-Arlay and Nassau-Breda
- Spouse: Anna of Lorraine
- Father: Henry III of Nassau-Breda
- Mother: Claudia of Chalon

René of Chalon (5 February 1513 – 15 July 1544), also known as Renatus of Chalon, was the prince of Orange and stadtholder of Holland, Zeeland, Utrecht and Gelre.

== Life ==
René was born in Breda, the only son of Count Henry III of Nassau-Breda and Claudia of Chalon. Claudia's brother, Philibert of Chalon, was the last Prince of Orange from the House of Chalon. When Philibert died in 1530, René inherited the Princedom of Orange on condition that he used the name and coat of arms of the Chalon-Orange family. History knows him therefore as René of Chalon instead of as "René of Nassau-Breda".

Coat of arms of René of Chalon as Prince of Orange. The 1st and 4th grand quarters show the arms of the Chalon-Arlay (the gold bend) princes of Orange (the bugle). The blue and gold checkers represent the arms of Blanche of Geneva, who married one of the Chalon princes. The 2nd and 3rd show the quarterings of Brittany and Luxembourg-Saint-Pol. The inescutcheon overall is his paternal arms quartered of Nassau and Breda.

René of Chalon married Anna of Lorraine (1522–1568) on 20 August 1540 at Bar-le-Duc. He was made a knight of the Golden Fleece the same year. The couple had only one child, a daughter named Maria, who lived only 3 weeks and was buried in the Grote Kerk in Breda. Rene himself was only 25 years old when he died, but he provided a historic and indispensable link which brought the house of Nassau to the stadholdership of the Netherlands.

== Death ==
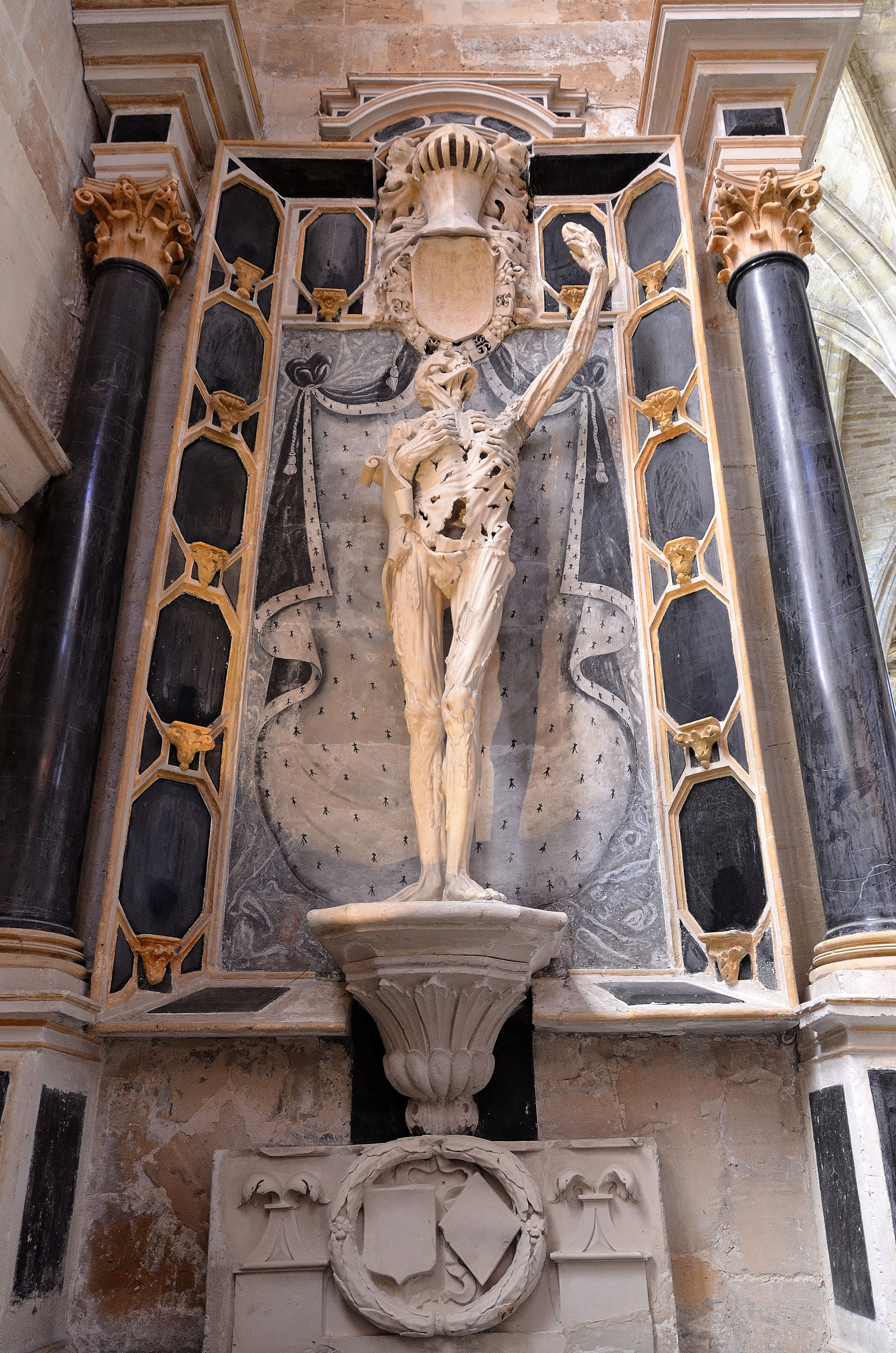
The Cadaver Tomb of Rene de Chalon

In 1544, René took part in the siege of St. Dizier in the service of Emperor Charles V. He was mortally wounded in battle and died with the Emperor attending at his bedside. René was buried in Grote Kerk in Breda, near the resting-place of his infant daughter. A commemorative monument (Cadaver Tomb of René of Chalon) stands in the church of St. Etienne in Bar-le-Duc.

== Succession ==
René of Chalon had inherited the principality of Orange from his maternal uncle, who had been the last male member of the House of Chalon. Like his uncle, Rene also had no surviving children, and in his last will and testament, he left all his landed possessions, including the principality, to his paternal cousin, William of Nassau-Dillenburg. Thus, the estates belonging to Rene's mother's brother passed into the family of Rene's father's brother, and William the Silent came into possession of the principality despite having no connection at all to the original House of Orange. The only condition placed by Rene was that his heir, William, should receive a Catholic education. William's father (Rene's uncle) agreed on behalf of his minor son, and the succession was endorsed by the Emperor, who was the overlord of most of Rene's possessions. William the Silent duly added the name of Orange to his own paternal dignities and thus became, in 1544, the founder of the House of Orange-Nassau.

The principality of Orange had already passed, through the female line, from the first dynasty of Orange to the families Les Baux, and then to that of De Chalon. It now passed to a family which was not descended in blood at all from any of the preceding families.

== Ancestors ==
Ancestors of René of Chalon

8. John IV, Count of Nassau-Siegen
4. John V, Count of Nassau-Siegen
9. Mary of Looz-Heinsberg
2. Henry III of Nassau-Breda
10. Henry III, Landgrave of Upper Hesse
5. Elisabeth of Hesse-Marburg
11. Anna of Katzenelnbogen
1. René of Chalon
12. William VII of Chalon-Arlay
6. John IV of Chalon-Arlay
13. Catherine of Brittany
3. Claudia of Chalon
14. Anthony I, Count of Ligny
7. Philiberte of Luxembourg-Ligny
15. Antoinette de Bauffremont

== Sources ==
- Guenther, Ilse (1995). "Rene of Chalon". In Bietenholz, Peter G.; Deutscher, Thomas Brian (eds.). Contemporaries of Erasmus: A Biographical Register of the Renaissance and Reformation. Vol. 1. University of Toronto Press.
- O'Malley, Charles Donald (1964). Andreas Vesalius of Brussels, 1514-1564. University of California Press.
- Rowen, Herbert H. (1988). The princes of Orange: The Stadholders in the Dutch Republic. Cambridge University Press. ISBN 0-8063-4811-9.
- Rietstap, Johannes Baptist (2003). Armorial general. Vol. 2. Genealogical Publishing Co. ISBN 0-8063-4811-9.
- Van Tol, Jonas (2019). Germany and the Coming of the French Wars of Religion. Brill.

René of Chalon House of Nassau Born: 5 February 1519 Died: 15 July 1544
Regnal titles
Preceded by Philibert of Chalon	Prince of Orange; 1530–1544	Succeeded by William the Silent
Preceded by Henry III of Nassau-Breda	Baron of Breda; 1538–1544	Succeeded by William the Silent
Political offices
Preceded by Antoine I de Lalaing	Stadtholder of Holland, Zeeland and Utrecht; 1540–1544	Succeeded by Louis of Praet
Preceded by Floris van Egmont	Stadtholder of Guelders; 1543–1544	Succeeded by Philip de Lalaing
