= Henry III of Nassau-Breda =

Dutch-German noble (1483–1538)

Henry III of Nassau-Dillenburg-Dietz
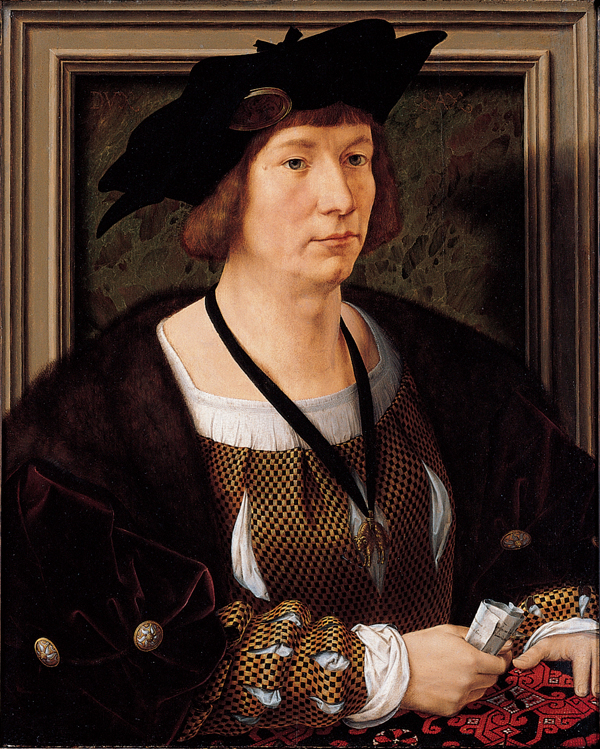
- Henry III by Jan Gossaert
- Born: 12 January 1483; Siegen, County of Nassau
- Died: 14 September 1538 (aged 55) Breda, Duchy of Brabant
- Allegiance: Habsburg dynasty
- Rank: Captain General
- Conflicts: War of the League of Cambrai; Italian War of 1521

Count Henry III of Nassau-Dillenburg-Dietz (12 January 1483 – 14 September 1538), Lord (from 1530 Baron) of Breda, Lord of the Lek, of Dietz, etc. was a count of the House of Nassau.

He was born in Siegen, the son of Count John V of Nassau-Dillenburg and Elisabeth of Hesse-Marburg. His younger brother was William I, Count of Nassau-Siegen (the father of William the Silent).

== Career ==
In 1499 Henry's uncle, count Engelbert II, invited Henry to the Burgundian Netherlands as his heir. He travelled with Philip the Handsome to Castile in 1501-1503. Upon the death of his uncle in 1504 Henry inherited the Nassau possessions in the Netherlands, including the wealthy lordship of Breda in the duchy of Brabant. The next year he was chosen a knight of the Golden Fleece. He again travelled to Spain in 1505-1506. He became a close confidant of the young Charles V as well as his Chamberlain (1510), becoming his Upper Chamberlain upon the death of William of Croÿ-Chièvres in 1521. The good relations between Charles and Henry is evident in the fact that Charles did not name a new Upper Chamberlain after Henry's death. Henry was named Grand Huntsman of Brabant, a position at court he held until the end of his life.

In 1519 he was part of the delegation that had Charles chosen king of the Romans. He was also prominently present at Charles' coronation to Emperor in Bologna in 1530. He was a member of the Privy Council of Charles since 1515 and of the Privy Council of Archduchess Margaret of Austria between 1525-1526. He temporarily served as Stadtholder of the conquered parts of Guelders and was Stadtholder of Holland and Zeeland between 1515 and 1521. Henry was again in Spain between 1522 and 1530 (accompanying Charles) and in 1533-1534 (with his wife and son).

== Military commander ==
Henry served as an important military commander in the Netherlands, defending Brabant from Guelders in 1508. He was Captain General in the war with Guelders between 1511 and 1513, and fought with Maximilian of Austria against France until 1514, participating in the battle of Guinegate (1513). He again commanded the armies against Guelders and France between 1516 and 1521, defeating the Black Band, which was in the employ of Charles of Guelders, in 1518 and defeating Robert van der Marck, Lord of Sedan in 1521. He also repelled Francis I of France, who invaded Hainaut that same year. Subsequently, Henry conquered Tournai.

The Castle of Breda after it was rebuilt in the Renaissance style.

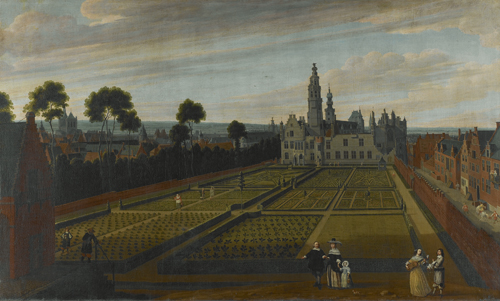
Guilliam van Schoor (landscape) and Gillis van Tilborch (figures). The Palace of Nassau in Brussels. 1658, Royal Museums of Fine Arts of Belgium

== Beliefs ==
Although Henry, who attended the Diet of Augsburg in 1530, was at first not averse to Martin Luther and his teachings, he later followed Charles' example and remained a staunch Catholic. He did not approve of the choice of his brother William, who did become a Lutheran, but remained supportive of him throughout his life. He was very impressed with the Renaissance and especially its arts, examples of which he encountered on his journeys to Spain and Italy. For example, he commissioned Italian architect Tomasso Vincidor da Bologna to completely rebuild his castle at Breda in a renaissance style in 1536, one of the first of such buildings north of the Alps. However, his interests seem to have been superficial. Desiderius Erasmus only considered him a "platonic friend of science".

== Family life and death ==
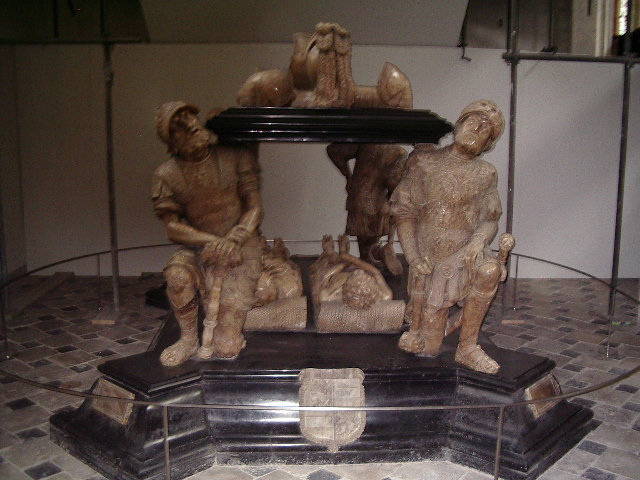
The grave monument of Engelbert II at the Grote kerk in Breda, Netherlands. Both Henry III and his son René are buried here.

Henry married three times:

- On 3 August 1503 Henry III married firstly Françoise Louise of Savoy (° bef. 1486 - † 17 September 1511). They had no children.
- In May 1515 Henry III married secondly Claudia of Châlon (° 1498 – † 31 May 1521). They had one son, René of Châlon (° 5 February 1519 - † 18 July 1544), who became prince of Orange in 1530 on the death of Claudia's brother Philibert.
- On 26 June 1524 Henry III married thirdly Mencia de Mendoza y Fonseca (° 30 November 1508 – † 4 January 1554). They had one son, born in March 1527, who lived only a few hours.

Henry had no further legitimate children, although he is known to have had some illegitimate offspring, amongst them Alexis of Nassau-Corroy and Isabelle of Nassau, both legitimised after the death of their father, and both had an impressive descendance. One of his descendants is Philippe François de Berghes, 1st Prince of Grimberghen.

His third marriage to Mencia de Mendoza y Fonseca was mainly encouraged by Charles V, as part of his plan to make the nobility of Spain and the Low Countries mix. Henry was however never really liked by the Spaniards, who regarded him as a loud and barbarian German parvenu. Upon his death, in Breda, in 1538 he was succeeded by his only son, but René was himself slain in battle only a few years later in 1544. Henry lies buried beneath the grave monument he had erected for his uncle Engelbert in the Grote kerk at Breda.

Coat of arms of Henry III. The 1st and 4th quarters show the arms of Nassau. The 2nd and 3rd show the arms of the lordship of Breda & Vianden.

== Sources ==
- Guenther, Ilse (1995). "Henry III of Nassau". In Bietenholz, Peter G.; Deutscher, Thomas Brian (eds.). Contemporaries of Erasmus: A Biographical Register of the Renaissance and Reformation. Vol. 2. University of Toronto Press.
- Martone, Eric (2011). "Counts of Orange". In Poddar, Prem; Jensen, Lars; Patke, Rajeev Shridhar (eds.). A Historical Companion to Postcolonial Literatures - Continental Europe and Its Empires. Edinburgh University Press.

Henry III of Nassau-Breda House of Nassau Born: 12 January 1483 Died: 14 September 1538
Preceded by Engelbert II of Nassau	Lord (Baron) of Breda; 1504–1538	Succeeded by René of Châlon
Preceded by John III of Egmond	Stadtholder of Holland and Zeeland; 1515–1521	Succeeded by Antoine de Lalaing, Count of Hoogstraten
Preceded by John V	Count of Nassau-Dillenburg; 1516–1538	Succeeded by William I
Preceded by John III	Count of Nassau-Beilstein; 1525–1538	Succeeded by William I
