= Philibert of Chalon =

French nobleman (1502–1530)

Philibert of Chalon, Prince of Orange
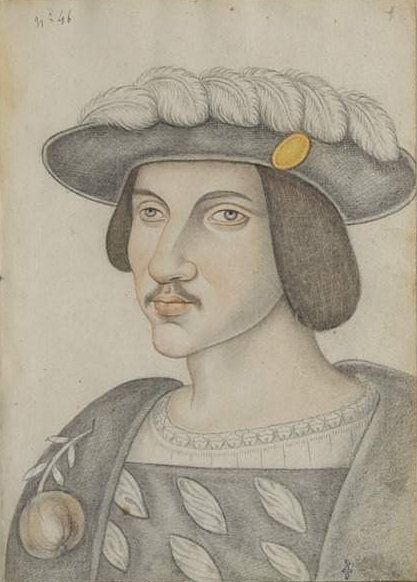
- Philibert of Chalon
- Reign: 18 March 1502 – 3 August 1530
- Predecessor: John II of Châlon
- Successor: René of Chalon
- Born: 18 March 1502; Nozeroy, Franche-Comté
- Died: 3 August 1530 (aged 28); Outside Florence, Italy
- Noble family: House of Chalon-Arlay
- Father: John IV lord of Arlay
- Mother: Philiberta of Luxembourg

Philibert de Chalon (18 March 1502 – 3 August 1530) was the last Prince of Orange from the House of Chalon.

== Biography ==
Born at Nozeroy to John IV of Chalon-Arlay, Philibert served Emperor Charles V as commander in Italy, fighting in the War of the League of Cognac. He took part in the Sack of Rome and was killed during the final stages of the Siege of Florence (1530). An interesting exchange of letters during the siege between him and Charles still survives.

He died in 1530 being the last legitimate male line descendant of the ancient house of Ivrea (Anscarids), he was succeeded as Prince of Orange by the son of his sister (Claudia of Chalon), Renatus of Nassau-Breda, who thus founded the House of Orange-Nassau.

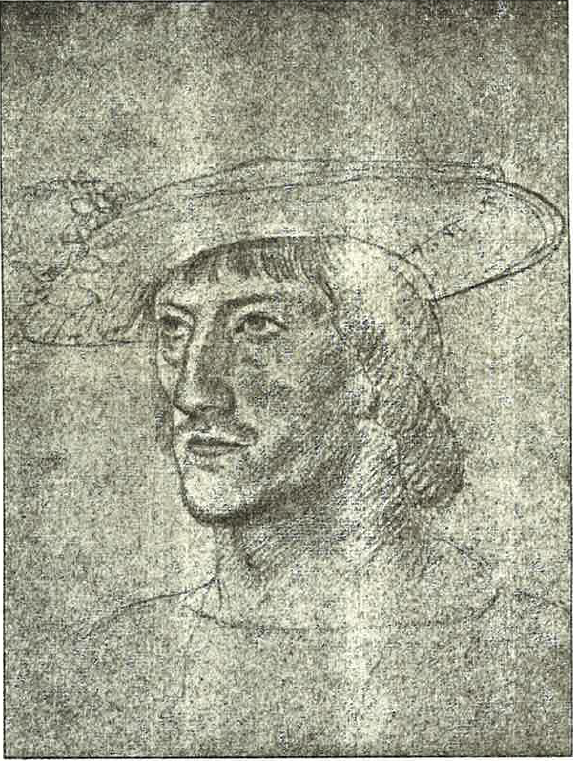
Portrait of Philibert Prince of Orange from a contemporary portrait.

== Ancestors ==
Ancestors of Philibert of Chalon

16. John III of Chalon-Arlay
8. Louis II of Chalon-Arlay
17. Mary of Baux-Orange
4. William VII of Chalon-Arlay
18. Henry II, Count of Montbéliard
9. Joanna of Montbéliard
19. Marie de Chatillon, Vicountess of Blaigny
2. John IV of Chalon-Arlay
20. John V, Duke of Brittany
10. Richard, Count of Étampes
21. Joan of Navarre
5. Catherine of Brittany
22. Louis I, Duke of Orléans
11. Marguerite, Countess of Vertus
23. Valentina Visconti
1. Philibert of Châlon
24. Peter of Luxembourg, Count of Saint-Pol
12. Louis de Luxembourg, Count of Saint-Pol
25. Margaret de Baux
6. Anthony I, Count of Ligny
26. Robert of Bar, Count of Marle and Soissons
13. Jeanne de Bar, Countess of Marle and Soissons
27. Jeanne de Béthune
3. Philiberta of Luxembourg
28. Henry de Bauffremont-Scey
14. Pierre de Bauffremont
29. Jeanne of Vergy-Mirebeau
7. Antoinette of Bauffremont
30. Philip III, Duke of Burgundy
15. Marie of Burgundy
31. Jeanne de Presles

== Sources ==
- Fletcher, Catherine (2016). The Black Prince of Florence: The Spectacular Life and Treacherous World of Alessandro de' Medici. Oxford University Press.
- Pitts, Vincent Joseph (1993). The man who sacked Rome: Charles de Bourbon, constable of France (1490–1527). P. Lang.

Philibert of Chalon House of Chalon-Arlay Born: 18 March 1502 3 August
Preceded by John II of Châlon	Prince of Orange; 1502–1530	Succeeded by René of Chalon
Government offices
Preceded by Ugo de Moncada	Viceroy of Naples; 1528–1530	Succeeded by Pompeo Colonna

== Sources ==
- The Prince of Orange in Medieval History of Navarre
