= Claudia of Chalon =

Princess of Orange (1498–1521)

Claudia of Chalon-Orange (1498 – May 31, 1521) was Princess of Orange. In 1515, she married Henry III of Nassau-Breda, thus uniting the houses of Orange and Nassau. Their son, René of Chalon, was the first Nassau to be Prince of Orange.

Claudia of Chalon was the daughter of John of Chalon, lord of Arlay and Philiberte of Luxembourg-Ligny. She was raised mainly at the French court.

She died at Diest and is thought to be buried in the Grote kerk ("big church") in Breda.

After the death of her brother Philibert of Chalon, the title of Prince of Orange went to her son René of Châlon.
