= John IV of Chalon-Arlay =

Prince of Orange

- Coat of arms of Chalon (red shield with yellow ribbon) and Orange (blue bugle); over all the (claimed) pattern of Geneva.
- Born: c. 1443
- Died: 15 April 1502
- Buried: Convent of Cordeliers Lons-le-Saunier, County of Burgundy
- Noble family: House of Chalon-Arlay
- Spouses: Jeanne de Bourbon; Philiberte de Luxembourg
- Issue: Philibert of Chalon; Claudia of Chalon
- Father: William VII lord of Arlay, prince of Orange
- Mother: Catherine of Brittany

John IV of Chalon-Arlay or John of Chalon (c. 1443-15 April 1503) was a prince of Orange and lord of Arlay. He played an important role in the Mad War, a series of conflicts in which aristocrats sought to resist the expansion and centralisation of power under the French monarch.

== Family ==
He was the son of William VII of Chalon-Arlay and the father of Philibert of Chalon and Claudia of Châlon. He was also the nephew of Francis II, Duke of Brittany and thereby a first cousin to Anne, Duchess of Brittany who would marry two French kings to become their Queen Consort.

== Support for Burgundy ==
John incurred the enmity of King Louis XI of France when he supported the interests of Charles the Bold, duke of Burgundy. After the defeat and death of Charles, Louis confiscated much of John's property. John's subsequent attempt to marry Charles's widow to Maximilian of Austria led to his exile from France.

== Support for Brittany ==
Nephew of Duke Francis II of Brittany, John IV now took an active role in the affairs of the duchy, prompted by Maximilian. An enemy of Pierre Landais, the duke's chief minister, John IV attempted to organise a coup against him, which failed. The duke confiscated his Breton properties. With king Louis now dead, John created an alliance with the new regent of France, Anne of Beaujeu. With her support, he was later able to force Francis to dismiss Landais, who was then convicted of various crimes in a show trial, tortured, and executed. John now became one of the main decision makers in the duchy. He advised Francis to marry his heir Anne to Maximilian of Austria, as a counterbalance to French influence, but the French invaded the duchy. This act of marriage contravened the rights of the King of France to approve Anne's marriage under the treaties which had ended the wars between the Kingdom of France and the Duchy of Brittany.

John was one of the leaders of the Breton army that resisted the invasion. However, he was defeated at the decisive Battle of Saint-Aubin-du-Cormier (1488). He attempted to play dead, but was identified and captured. He was placed under house arrest, but was released by King Charles VIII, in order to return to Brittany and prevent the marriage of Anne to Alain d'Albret. After the death of duke Francis, John became heir presumptive to the new duchess, Anne. He was a member of the high council, and was appointed commander of Rennes and lieutenant general. John once again attempted to secure Anne's marriage to Maximilian, but the French intervened. John negotiated the eventual marriage between Anne and king Charles, of which he was one of the witnesses. He surrendered his own claim to the duchy for the large sum of 100,000 livres, and was reappointed as lieutenant general of Brittany, a position he held until his death.

== Marriages and children ==
John's first wife was Jeanne de Bourbon. His second wife was Philiberta de Luxembourg, daughter of Anthony I, Count of Ligny.

John had three children:

- Philibert of Chalon
- unnamed son
- Claudia of Chalon

== Succession ==
John IV of Chalon-Arlay died April 8, 1502, at the age of 59. His son Philibert of Châlon succeeded him.

His wife Philiberte de Luxembourg ordered an alabaster tomb from the sculptors Conrad Meyts and Giovanni Battista Mariotto. The tomb is in the convent of Cordeliers Lons-le-Saunier, County of Burgundy. It contains John, his first wife Jeanne de Bourbon, his first daughter Claudia, his second son Philibert of Châlon and Philiberte herself.

== Sources ==
- Cool, Hans (2003). "Le destin d'un heros comtois: Philibert de Chalon, prince d'Orange (1502–1530)". In Delsalle, Paul; Delobette, Laurence (eds.). La Franche-Comté à la charnière du Moyen Age et de la Renaissance, 1450–1550 (in French). Presses Universitaires Franc-Comtoises.

John IV of Chalon-Arlay House of Chalon-Arlay Born: 1443 Died: 15 April 1502
Preceded by William VII	Prince of Orange; 1475–1502	Succeeded by Philibert
