= List of princesses of Orange by marriage =

This is a list of women who held the title Princess of Orange by marriage.

Princess of Orange is the title used by the female heirs apparent to the throne of the Netherlands and, prior to 2002, spouses of male heirs apparent. The present Princess of Orange, Catharina-Amalia, is the first suo jure holder since Marie (1393–1417), who co-reigned with her husband John (1393–1418). From 1171 to 1815 the title was also used by women married to the sovereign Princes of Orange during their reigns, and then by wives of heirs apparent to the Dutch throne. On 30 April 2013, after the accession of her father, Willem-Alexander, to the Dutch throne, Catharina-Amalia became Princess of Orange and heir apparent to the throne.

== Princesses of Orange ==
=== House of Baux ===
Picture	Name	Father	Birth	Marriage	Became Princess	Ceased to be Princess	Death	Spouse
	Tibors de Sarenom	Guilhem	1130	after 5 June 1156	1171 husband's accession	1181 husband's death	after 13 August 1198	Bertrand I
	Ermengarde de Mévouillon	Mévouillon	1130	after 5 June 1156	1181 husband's accession	21 March 1203 divorce	?	William I
	Alix	Unknown	?	after 1203		1218, before 30 July husband's death	1219?	William I
	Malberjone of Aix	Aix	?	17 June 1239		?	?	Raymond I
	Eleonore of Geneva	Geneva	?	1273	1282 husband's accession	1314 husband's death	?	Bertrand II
	Anne de Viennois	Viennois-de la Tour-du-Pin	?	before 31 January 1318		1340 husband's death	after 27 November 1357	Raymond II
	Constance of Trian	Trian	?	?	1340 husband's death	before 1358		Raymond III
	Jeanne of Geneva	Geneva	?	12 April 1358		before 15 February 1389		Raymond III

=== House of Chalon-Arlay ===
Picture	Name	Father	Birth	Marriage	Became Princess	Ceased to be Princess	Death	Spouse
	Joanna of Montfaucon	Henri of Montbéliard, Lady of Montfaucon (Montfaucon)	-	April 1418	October 1417 husband's accession	14 May 1445		Louis I
	Eléonore of Armagnac	John IV, Count of Armagnac (Armagnac)	1423	26 September 1446		6/11 December 1456		Louis I
	Blanche of Gamaches	Guillaume, Lord of Gamaches (Gamaches)	-	-		3 December 1463 husband's death	23 May 1479	Louis I
	Catherine of Brittany	Richard, Count of Étampes (Montfort)	1428	19 August 1438	3 December 1463 husband's accession	27 September 1475 husband's death	before 22 Abril 1476	William II
	Joanna of Bourbon	Charles I, Duke of Bourbon (Bourbon)	1442	21 October 1467	27 September 1475 husband's accession	1493		John II
	Philiberta of Luxembourg	Antoine de Luxembourg, Count of Ligny (Luxemburg-Ligny)	-	January 1494		15 April 1502 husband's death	May 1539	John II

=== House of Nassau ===
Picture	Name	Father	Birth	Marriage	Became Princess	Ceased to be Princess	Death	Spouse
	Anna of Lorraine	Antoine, Duke of Lorraine (Lorraine)	25 July 1522	22 August 1540		15 July 1544 husband's death	15 May 1568	René

=== House of Orange-Nassau ===
Picture	Name	Father	Birth	Marriage	Became Princess	Ceased to be Princess	Death	Spouse
	Anna van Egmont	Maximiliaan van Egmond (Egmond)	March 1533	6 July 1551		24 March 1558		William I
	Anna of Saxony	Maurice, Elector of Saxony (Wettin)	23 December 1544	25 August 1561		22 March 1571 marriage annulled	18 December 1577	William I
	Charlotte of Bourbon	Louis, Duke of Montpensier (Bourbon-Montpensier)	1546/7	24 June 1575		5 May 1582		William I
	Louise de Coligny	Gaspard II de Coligny (Coligny)	23 September 1555	24 April 1583		10 July 1584 husband's death	13 November 1620	William I
	Eleonora of Bourbon-Condé	Henri I, Prince of Condé (Bourbon-Condé)	30 April 1587	23 November 1606		20 February 1618 husband's death	20 January 1619	Philip William
	Amalia of Solms-Braunfels	John Albert I, Count of Solms-Braunfels (Solms-Braunfels)	31 August 1602	4 April 1625	23 April 1625 husband's accession	14 March 1647 husband's death	8 September 1675	Frederick Henry
	Mary Henrietta of England	Charles I of England (Stuart)	4 November 1631	2 May 1641	14 March 1647 husband's accession	6 November 1650 husband's death	4 December 1660	William II
	Mary of England	James II of England (Stuart)	30 April 1662	4 November 1677		28 December 1694		William III

== As personal and courtesy title ==
=== House of Orange-Nassau ===
Picture	Name	Father	Birth	Marriage	Became Princess	Ceased to be Princess	Death	Spouse
	Marie Louise of Hesse-Kassel	Charles I, Landgrave of Hesse-Kassel (Hesse-Kassel)	7 February 1688	26 April 1709		14 July 1711 husband's death	9 April 1765	John William Friso
	Anne of Great Britain and Hanover	George II of Great Britain (Hanover)	2 November 1709	25 March 1734		22 October 1751 husband's death	12 January 1759	William IV
	Wilhelmina of Prussia	Prince Augustus William of Prussia (Hohenzollern)	7 August 1751	4 October 1767		9 April 1806 husband's death	9 June 1820	William V
	Wilhelmine of Prussia	Frederick William II of Prussia (Hohenzollern)	18 November 1774	1 October 1791	9 April 1806 husband's accession	16 March 1815 became queen	12 October 1837	William VI
	Anna Pavlovna of Russia	Paul I of Russia (Holstein-Gottorp-Romanov)	18 January 1795	21 February 1816		7 October 1840 became queen	1 March 1865	William VII
	Sophie of Württemberg	William I of Württemberg (Württemberg)	17 June 1818	18 June 1839	7 October 1840 husband's accession	7 March 1849 became queen	3 June 1877	William VIII
