= John II of Chalon-Arlay =

John II lord of Arlay
- Coat of arms of the lord of Arlay.
- Born: 1312
- Died: 1362 (aged 49–50)
- Noble family: House of Chalon-Arlay
- Spouses: Marguerite de Mello; Marie de Geneva
- Issue: Hugh II lord of Arlay; Louis I lord of Arguel
- Father: Hugh I lord of Arlay
- Mother: Beatrice de La Tour-du-Pin

John II, lord of Chalon-Arlay (1312 – 25 February 1362) was a member of the House of Chalon-Arlay. He succeeded his father Hugh I lord of Arlay to this title, and was himself succeeded by his son, Hugh II lord of Arlay.

== Life ==
Born in 1312, John was the son of Hugh I lord of Arlay and Béatrice de La Tour-du-Pin (1275–1347), the daughter of the comte Humbert I. Before 1332, he married Marguerite of Mello (House of Mello, daughter of the lord of Château-Chinon and of Sainte-Hermine Dreux IV of Mello, and of Eleanor of Savoy, daughter of the Duke of Aosta and Count of Savoy Amadeus V). With Marguerite he had the following children:

- John of Chalon (died 1360) Seigneur d'Auberive
- Hugh II lord of Arlay (1334–1388) Seigneur d'Arlay, in 1363 married Blanche, Dame de Frontenay
- Louis I of Chalon-Arlay (died 1366) Seigneur d'Arguel, married Marguerite of Vienne in 1363 (daughter of the Seigneur de Pymont Philippe de Vienne)
- Marguerite of Châlon (1338–1392), married c.1356 to comte Etienne de Montbéliard and Seigneur de Montfaucon.

In 1361, he remarried to Marie of Geneva, daughter of Amadeus III, Count of Geneva.

== Sources ==
- Chattaway, Carol Mary (2006). The Order of the Golden Tree: The Gift-giving Objectives of Duke Philip the Bold of Burgundy. Brepols Publishers.
