= Louis I of Chalon-Arlay =

Louis I lord of Arguel
- Coat of arms of the lord of Arlay.
- Born: 1337
- Died: 1366 (aged 28–29); Mesembria
- Noble family: House of Chalon-Arlay
- Spouse: Margaret of Vienne
- Issue: John III lord of Arlay
- Father: John II lord of Arlay
- Mother: Margaret of Male

Louis I of Chalon-Arlay (1337–1366) was the second son of John II lord of Arlay and Margaret of Male.

When his father died in 1362, his elder brother Hugh II lord of Arlay inherited the Lordship of Arlay and Louis became Lord of Arguel and Ciuseaux.

Louis died during the Savoyard crusade.

== Marriage and issue ==
Louis was married to Margaret of Vienne, daughter of Philippe de Vienne, Seigneur de Pymont. His son

- John III inherited the lordship of Arlay from Hugo II in 1377 and married Mary of Baux-Orange, who was the heiress of the Principality of Orange.

== Sources ==
- Setton, Kenneth Meyer (1976). The Papacy and the Levant, 1204-1571: The Thirteenth and Fourteenth Centuries. Vol. I. The American Philosophical Society.
