= John III of Chalon-Arlay =

John III lord of Arlay
- Coat of arms of Chalon (red shield with yellow ribbon) and Orange (blue bugle); over all the (claimed) county of Geneva.
- Died: 1418
- Noble family: House of Chalon-Arlay
- Spouse: Mary of Baux-Orange
- Issue: Louis II lord of Arlay
- Father: Louis I lord of Arguel
- Mother: Marguerite de Vienne

John III of Chalon-Arlay (died 1418) was a French nobleman and a member of the House of Chalon-Arlay. He was the son of Louis I lord of Arguel, and the heir of his uncle, Louis's brother, Hugh II lord of Arlay from whom he inherited Arlay.

He married Mary of Baux-Orange, who was the heiress of the Principality of Orange. John thus became Prince jure uxoris of Orange. John and Mary were the parents of

- Louis II lord of Arlay.
- Jean de Chalon, sire de Vitteaux (d. 1462)
- Hugues de Chalon, sire de Cuiseaux (d. 1426, without issue)
- Alix de Chalon, dame de Bussy (d. 1457)
- Marie de Chalon, dame de Cerlier (d. 1465)

== Sources ==
- Josso, Carole (2003). "Nozeroy (Jura): architecture civile des XVe et XVIe siècles". In Delobette, Laurence; Delsalle, Paul (eds.). La Franche-Comté à la charnière du Moyen Age et de la Renaissance, 1450-1550 (in French). Presses universitaires Franc-Comtoises. pp. 373–402.
