= Chalon-Arlay =

French noble family

House Coat of Arms: arms of the lord of Arlay (red shield with gold bend). Parent House: House of Ivrea House Succession: They eventually succeeded to the undifferenced arms as well as to the principality of Orange.

The House of Chalon-Arlay was a noble house of the Holy Roman Empire. They were the lords of Arlay in the county of Burgundy and a cadet branch of the ruling house of the county, the House of Ivrea. The founder of the house was John I of Chalon-Arlay, fifth son of John, Count of Chalon. When John III, lord of Arlay, married Mary de Baux, princess of Orange, the House acquired the principality of Orange.

For more details, and a family tree, see below.

== List of lords ==
=== Lords of Chalon-Arlay ===
- John, Count of Chalon, founder of the seigneurie of Chalon-Arlay
- John I of Chalon-Arlay (1258–1315), seigneur of Arlay (1266–1315) and vicomte of Besançon (son of the above).
- Hugh I of Chalon-Arlay (1288–1322), seigneur of Arlay and of Vitteaux (son of the above).
- John II of Chalon-Arlay (1312–), seigneur of Arlay (son of the above).
- Hugh II of Chalon-Arlay (1334–1388) seigneur of Arlay (son of the above).

=== Lords of Chalon-Arlay and Princes of Orange ===
- John III of Chalon-Arlay (?–1418) seigneur d'Arlay and prince of Orange (nephew of the former).
- Louis II of Chalon-Arlay (1390–1463), seigneur of Arlay and Arguel and prince of Orange (son of the former).
- William VII of Chalon-Arlay (?–1475), prince of Orange (son of the former).
- John IV of Chalon-Arlay (1443–1502), prince of Orange, seigneur of Arlay, of Nozeroy and of Montfort (son of the former)
- Philibert of Chalon (1502–1530), prince of Orange, seigneur of Arlay and seigneur of Nozeroy (son of the former, died childless)
- René of Chalon (1519–1544) prince of Orange, stadtholder of Holland, Zeeland, of the Diocese of Utrecht and of Guelders (nephew of the former, died childless, succeeded as prince of Orange by William the Silent).

== Family tree ==
John count of Chalon; HOUSE OF IVREA
Hugh count of Burgundy	John I lord of Chalon-Arlay; HOUSE OF CHALON-ARLAY
Hugh I lord of chalon-Arlay
John II lord of Chalon-Arlay	Amadeus III count of Geneva
Hugh II lord of Chalon-Arlay	Louis I lord of Arguel & Ciuseaux	Joan of Geneva ∞ Raymond V of Baux-Orange
John III lord of Chalon-Arlay	Mary princess of Orange
Louis II "le Bon" prince of Orange	Jean de Chalon sire de Vitteaux (d. 1462)	Hugues de Chalon sire de Cuiseaux (d. 1426) no desc.	Alix de Chalon dame de Bussy (d. 1457)	Marie de Chalon dame de Cerlier (d. 1465)
William VII prince of Orange	Louis, Lord of Chateau-Guyon (1448–1476); Knight of the Order of the Golden Fleece	Hugh de Chalon, Lord of Château-Guyon (d. 3 July 1490) ∞ Louise of Savoy, a daughter of Duke Amadeus IX of Savoy	Philippine de Chalon a nun at Sainte-Clarisse d'Orbe (d. 1507)	Jeanne de Chalon (d. 15 Sep 1483) ∞ 25 Mar 1472 Louis de Seyssel, Cte de la Chambre (d. 15 Sep 1483)
John IV lord of Chalon-Arlay
Philibert prince of Orange	Claudia princess of Orange	Henry III lord of Breda	William I count of Nassau-Siegen; HOUSE OF NASSAU
René prince of Orange	William I or VIII prince of Orange

== Gallery of arms ==
Heraldic shield of the house of Chalon.

Heraldic shield of the house of Chalon of Orange. The 1st and 4th quarters show the arms of Chalon-Arlay (Gules a bend Or), the 2nd and 3rd the princes of Orange (the bugle). The blue and gold cross is the arms of Jeanne of Geneva, who married one of the Chalon princes.

Arms of Louis de Châlon (1448–1476)

Arms of Philbert de Châlon, Prince of Orange

Arms of Rene of Orange-Nassau-Breda (1530–1544): overall in the center as an escutcheon is the quartered arms of Nassau and Vianden/Breda.
