= Hugh II of Chalon-Arlay =

Hugh II lord of Arlay
- Coat of arms of the lord of Arlay.
- Born: 1334
- Died: 1388 (aged 53–54)
- Noble family: House of Chalon-Arlay
- Spouse: Blanche de Geneva
- Father: John II lord of Arlay
- Mother: Marguerite of Mello

Hugh II of Chalon-Arlay (1334–1388) was the son and successor as lord of Arlay to John II. His mother was Marguerite of Mello (House of Mello, daughter of the lord of Château-Chinon and of Sainte-Hermine Dreux IV of Mello, and of Eleanor of Savoy, daughter of the Duke of Aosta and Count of Savoy Amadeus V).

In 1363, he married Blanche, Dame de Frontenay and daughter of Amadeus III, Count of Geneva. He died without issue and was succeeded by his nephew John III (son of Hugh II's brother Louis I of Chalon-Arlay).
