= John I of Chalon-Arlay =

Jean I lord of Arlay
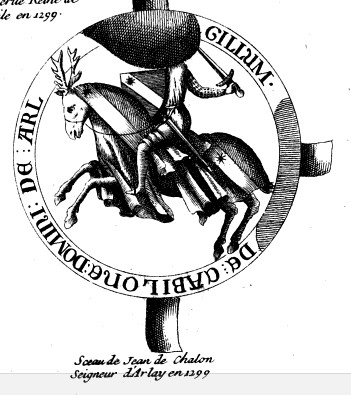
- Seal of Jean I of Chalon-Arlay
- Born: 1258
- Died: 1315 (aged 56–57)
- Noble family: House of Chalon-Arlay
- Spouses: Marguerite of Burgundy; Alix de Clermont-Nesle
- Issue: Hugh I lord of Arlay
- Father: Jean, Count of Chalon
- Mother: Laure de Commercy

Jean I of Chalon-Arlay (1258–1315) was a French nobleman. He was the son of Jean, Count of Chalon and Laure de Commercy, a couple who had thirty castles built on the Jurassian part of the county of Burgundy around their new seigneurie of Salins, including the Château d'Arlay (upon the death of Otto III in 1248, the elder Jean had become regent of the county of Burgundy on behalf of his son Hugh III, his daughter-in-law Adelaide, and his grandson Otto). He was Seigneur of Arlay (1266–1315) and Viscount of Besançon (1295–1315).

== Marriage and issue ==
Around 1272 John married Marguerite of Burgundy, daughter of Hugh IV, Duke of Burgundy, and then for a second time to Alix de Clermont-Nesle (daughter of seigneur Raoul II de Clermont-Nesle of the House of Clermont-Nesle).

John and Marguerite had:

- Hugh I (1288–1322), who became Seigneur of Arlay, Arguel and Cuiseaux and viscount of Besançon (1315–1322).
- Isabelle of Chalon-Arlay, married Louis II of Vaud

John and Alix had:

- Catherine of Châlon (d.1355), married 1342 to Thiébaud (Thibaut) V Seigneur (lord) of Neuchâtel-Burgundy (fr) (c.1317-1366), being a widower, and bore four children.

== Life ==
Jean I fought with the barons' league against King Philip IV of France from 1294 to 1301. In 1305 he fought against Renaud of Burgundy, count of Montbéliard, to force him to recognise Jean's suzerainté over the neighbouring castles of Dramelay, Binans and Pimorin. Jean I disappears from the historical record in 1315 and was succeeded as seigneur by his son Hugh.

John was a patron of the poet Jean Priorat.

== See also ==
- House of Chalon-Arlay

== Sources ==
- de La Corbiere, Matthieu (2002). L'invention et la défense des frontières dans la diocèse de Genève étude des principautés et de l'habitat fortifié (XIIe - XIVe siècle) (in French). Académie salésienne.
