= Saint-Germain-lès-Arlay =

- Part of Arlay
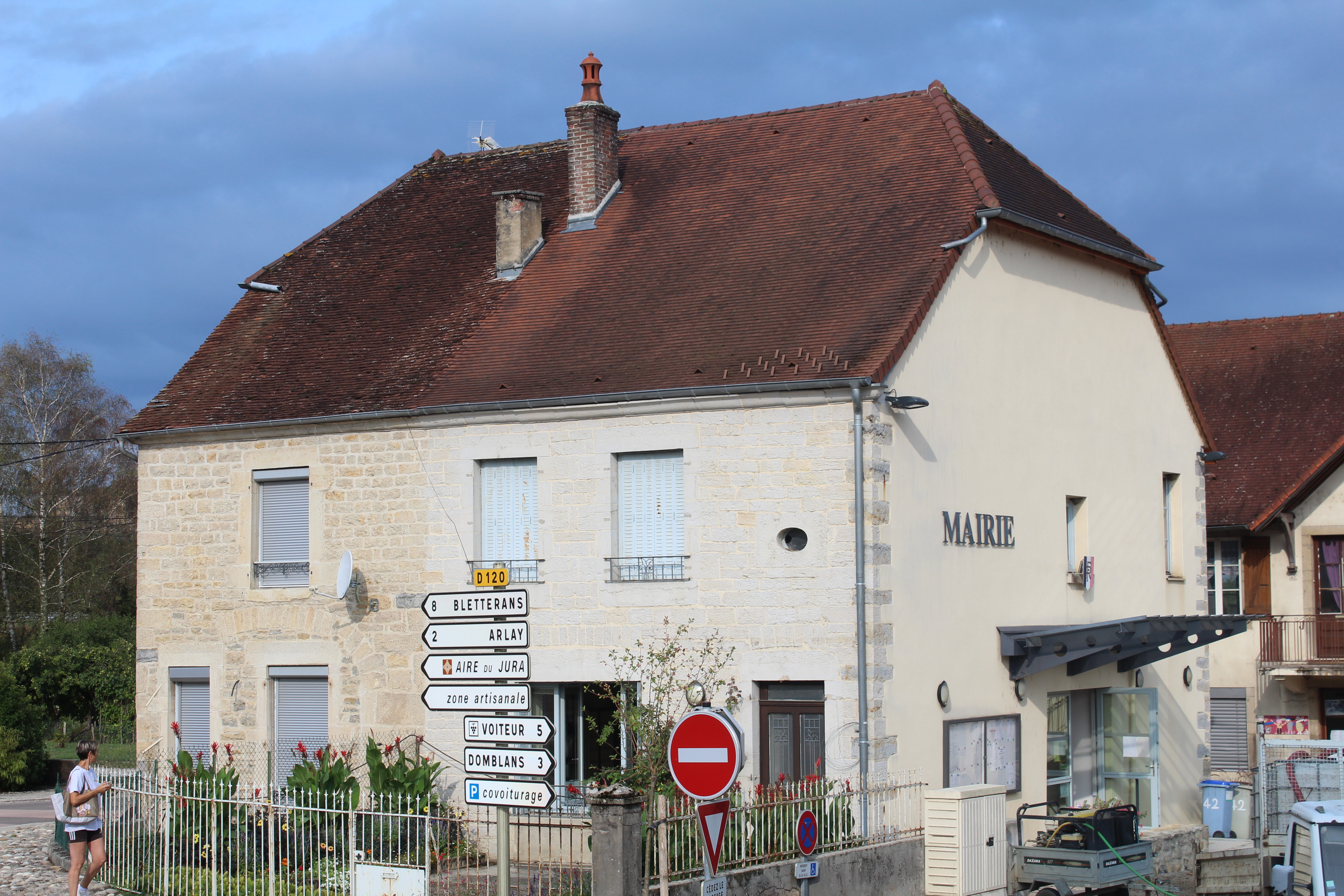
- Town hall
- Location of Saint-Germain-lès-Arlay
- Location within France Location within Bourgogne-Franche-Comté
- Coordinates: 46°45′38″N 5°33′39″E
- Country: France
- Region: Bourgogne-Franche-Comté
- Department: Jura
- Arrondissement: Lons-le-Saunier
- Canton: Bletterans
- Commune: Arlay
- Area^{1}: 6.08 km^{2} (2.35 sq mi)
- Highest elevation: 386 m (1,266 ft)
- Lowest elevation: 222 m (728 ft)
- Population (2023): 422
  - Density: 69.4/km^{2} (180/sq mi)
- Time zone: UTC+01:00 (CET)
  - Summer (DST): UTC+02:00 (CEST)
- Postal code: 39210
- ^{1} French Land Register data, which excludes lakes, ponds, glaciers > 1 km^{2} (0.386 sq mi or 247 acres) and river estuaries.

Saint-Germain-lès-Arlay (French pronunciation: [sɛ̃ ʒɛʁmɛ̃ lɛ.z‿aʁlɛ], literally Saint-Germain near Arlay) is a former commune in the Jura department in the Bourgogne-Franche-Comté region in eastern France. On 1 January 2016, it was merged into the commune of Arlay.

== See also ==
- Communes of the Jura department
