= Mary II =

Queen of England, Scotland, and Ireland from 1689 to 1694

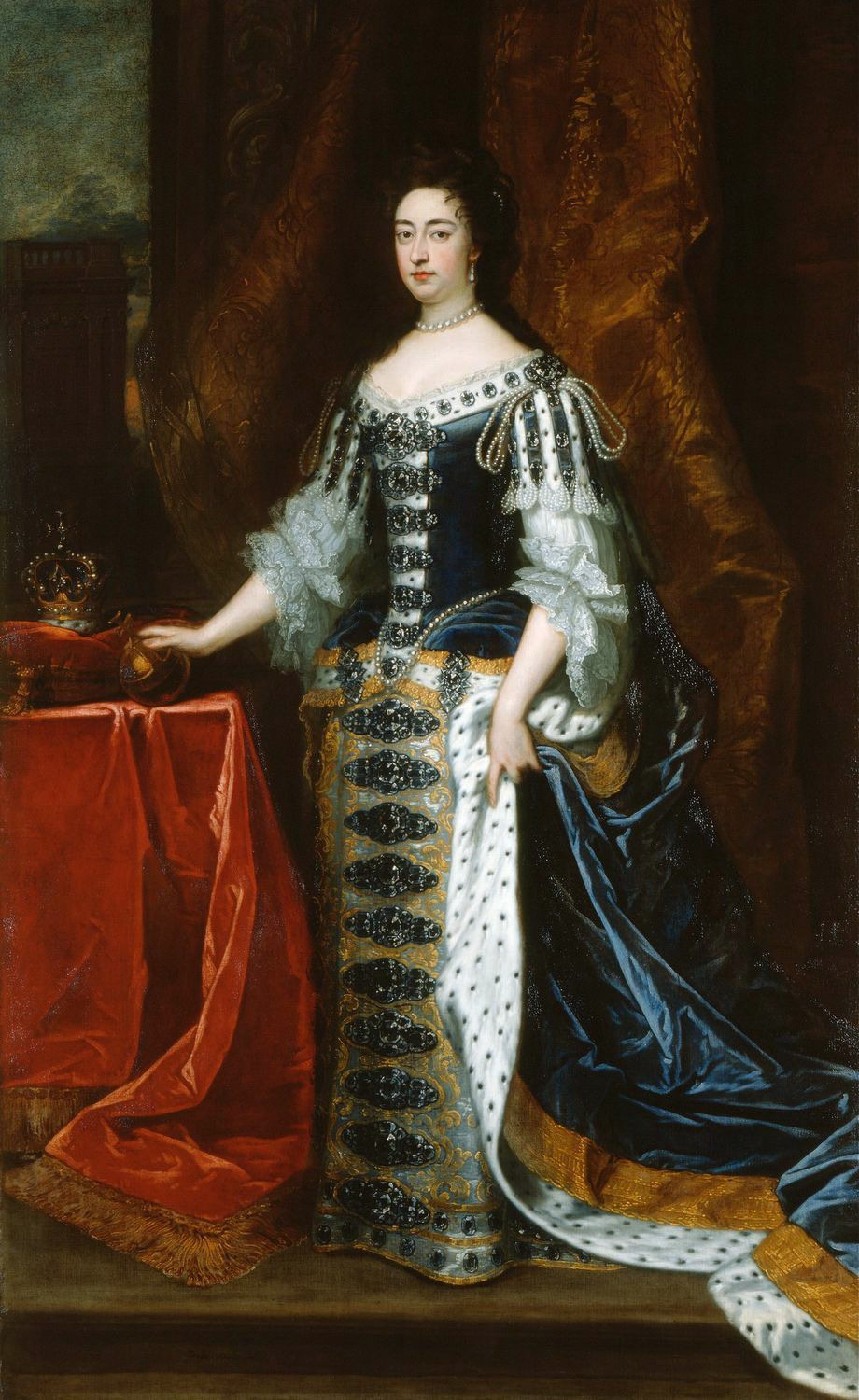
- Portrait, 1690

Queen of England, Scotland, and Ireland
- Reign: 1689 (Note: Mary II was declared queen by the Parliament of England on 13 February 1689 and by the Parliament of Scotland on 11 April 1689.) – 28 December 1694
- Coronation: 11 April 1689
- Predecessor: James VII and II
- Successor: William III & II
- Co-monarch: William III & II

Princess consort of Orange
- Tenure: 4 November 1677 – 28 December 1694
- Born: 30 April 1662 [NS: 10 May 1662] St James's Palace, Westminster, England
- Died: 28 December 1694 (aged 32) [NS: 7 January 1695] Kensington Palace, Middlesex, England
- Cause of death: Smallpox
- Burial: 5 March 1695; Westminster Abbey, London
- Spouse: William III and II (m. 1677)
Era name and dates
- William and Mary: 1689–1694
- House: Stuart
- Father: James VII and II
- Mother: Anne Hyde
- Religion: Anglicanism

Mary II (30 April 1662 – 28 December 1694) was Queen of England, Scotland, and Ireland with her husband, King William III and II, from 1689 until her death in 1694. She was also Princess of Orange following her marriage on 4 November 1677. Her joint reign with William over Britain is known as that of William and Mary.

Mary was born during the reign of her uncle King Charles II. She was the eldest daughter of James, Duke of York and Albany (the future King James VII and II), and his first wife, Anne Hyde. Mary and her sister Anne were raised as Anglicans at the behest of Charles II, although their parents both converted to Roman Catholicism. Charles lacked legitimate children, making Mary second in the line of succession. At the age of 15, she married her cousin William of Orange, a Protestant. Charles died in 1685 and James became king, making Mary heir presumptive. James's attempts at rule by decree and the birth of his son from a second marriage, James Francis Edward (later known as "the Old Pretender"), led to his deposition in the Glorious Revolution of 1688/89 and the adoption of the English Bill of Rights.

William and Mary became king and queen regnant. Mary mostly deferred to her husband when he was in England. She did, however, act alone when William was engaged in military campaigns abroad, proving herself to be a powerful, firm, and effective ruler. Mary's early death from smallpox in 1694 at the age of 32 left William as sole ruler until his death in 1702, when he was succeeded by Mary's sister, Anne.

== Early life ==
Mary was born on 30 April 1662 at St James's Palace in London, the eldest daughter of James, Duke of York (the future King James II & VII), and his first wife, Anne Hyde. Mary's uncle was Charles II, who ruled the three kingdoms of England, Scotland and Ireland; her maternal grandfather, Edward Hyde, 1st Earl of Clarendon, served for a lengthy period as Charles's chief advisor. She was baptised into the Anglican faith in the Chapel Royal at St James's, and was named after her ancestor Mary, Queen of Scots. Her godparents included her father's cousin Prince Rupert of the Rhine. Although her mother bore eight children, all except Mary and her younger sister Anne died very young, and Charles II had no legitimate children. Consequently, for most of her childhood, Mary was second in line to the throne after her father.

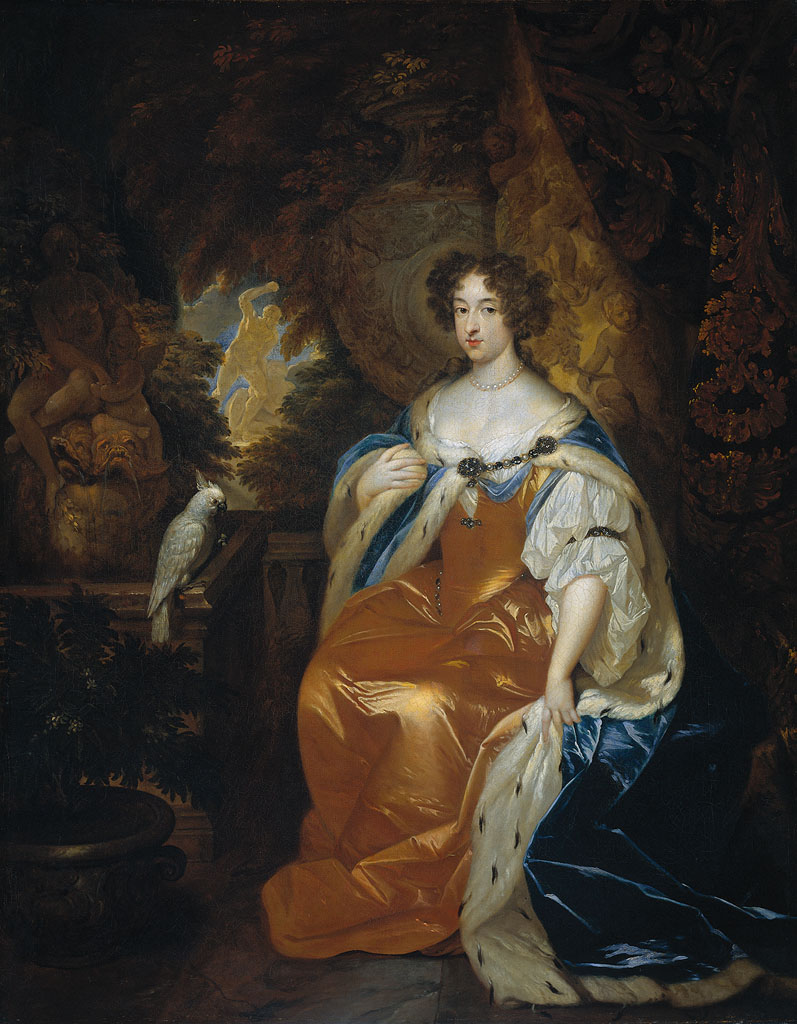
Portrait by Caspar Netscher, 1683

The Duke of York converted to Roman Catholicism in 1668 or 1669 and the Duchess about eight years earlier, but Mary and Anne were brought up as Anglicans, pursuant to the command of Charles II. They were moved to their own establishment at Richmond Palace, where they were raised by their governess Lady Frances Villiers, with only occasional visits to see their parents at St James's or their grandfather Lord Clarendon at Twickenham. Mary's education, from private tutors, was largely restricted to music, dance, drawing, French, and religious instruction. Her mother died in 1671, and her father remarried in 1673, taking as his second wife Mary of Modena, a Catholic who was only four years older than Mary.

From about the age of nine until her marriage, Mary wrote passionate letters to an older girl, Frances Apsley, the daughter of courtier Sir Allen Apsley. Mary signed herself 'Mary Clorine'; Apsley was 'Aurelia'. In time, Frances Apsley became uncomfortable with the correspondence, and replied more formally.

At the age of 15, Mary became betrothed to her first cousin, the Protestant Stadtholder of Holland, William III of Orange. William was the son of Charles II's late sister Mary, Princess Royal, and thus fourth in the line of succession after James, Mary, and Anne. At first, Charles opposed the alliance with the Dutch ruler—he preferred that Mary wed the heir to the French throne, the Dauphin Louis, thus allying his realms with Catholic France and strengthening the odds of an eventual Catholic successor in Britain—but later, under pressure from Parliament and with a coalition with the Catholic French no longer politically favourable, he approved the proposed union. The Duke of York agreed to the marriage, after pressure from chief minister Lord Danby and the King, who incorrectly assumed that it would improve James's popularity among Protestants. When James told Mary that she was to marry her cousin, "she wept all that afternoon and all the following day".

== Marriage ==
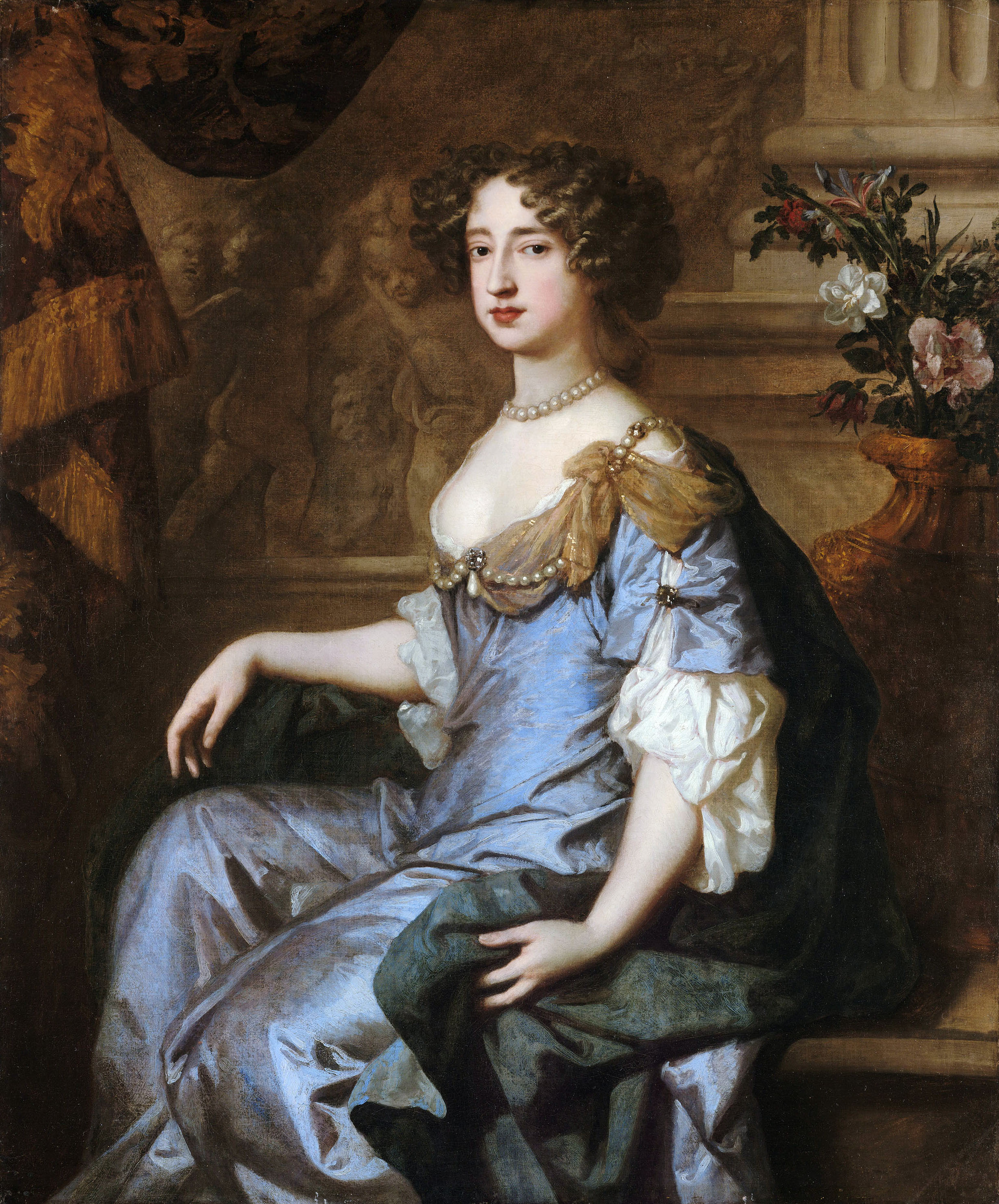
Portrait by Peter Lely, 1677

William and a tearful Mary were married in St James's Palace by Bishop Henry Compton on 4 November 1677. The bedding ceremony to publicly establish the consummation of the marriage was attended by the royal family, with her uncle the King himself drawing the bedcurtains. Mary accompanied her husband on a rough sea crossing to the Netherlands later that month, after a delay of two weeks caused by bad weather. Rotterdam was inaccessible because of ice, and they were forced to land at the small village of Ter Heijde, and walk through the frosty countryside until met by coaches to take them to Huis Honselaarsdijk. On 14 December, they made a formal entry to The Hague in a grand procession.

Mary's animated and personable nature made her popular with the Dutch people, and her marriage to a Protestant prince was popular in Britain. She was devoted to her husband, but he was often away on campaigns, which led to Mary's family supposing him to be cold and neglectful. Within months of the marriage Mary was pregnant; however, on a visit to her husband at the fortified city of Breda, she suffered a miscarriage, which may have permanently impaired her ability to have children. Further bouts of illness, which may also have been miscarriages, occurred in mid-1678, early 1679, and early 1680. Her childlessness would be the greatest source of unhappiness in her life.

From May 1684, Charles II's illegitimate son, James Scott, Duke of Monmouth, lived in the Netherlands, where he was hosted by William and Mary. Monmouth was viewed as a rival to the Duke of York, and as a potential Protestant heir who could supplant the Duke in the line of succession. William, however, did not consider him a viable alternative and correctly assumed that Monmouth had insufficient support.

While the pair started out somewhat distant, they became quite close and trusting of each other over the course of their marriage. (Note: William did not trust her entourage unconditionally. He took the precaution of appointing as her personal secretary his illegitimate elder half-brother, Abel Tassin d'Alonne, whom he trusted implicitly. D'Alonne was among other things instrumental in preventing a plot to abduct Mary, in which her private chaplain John Covel was involved. D'Alonne would remain her private secretary until her death.) Their mutual fervour for Protestantism additionally helped bind them together.

== James's reign ==
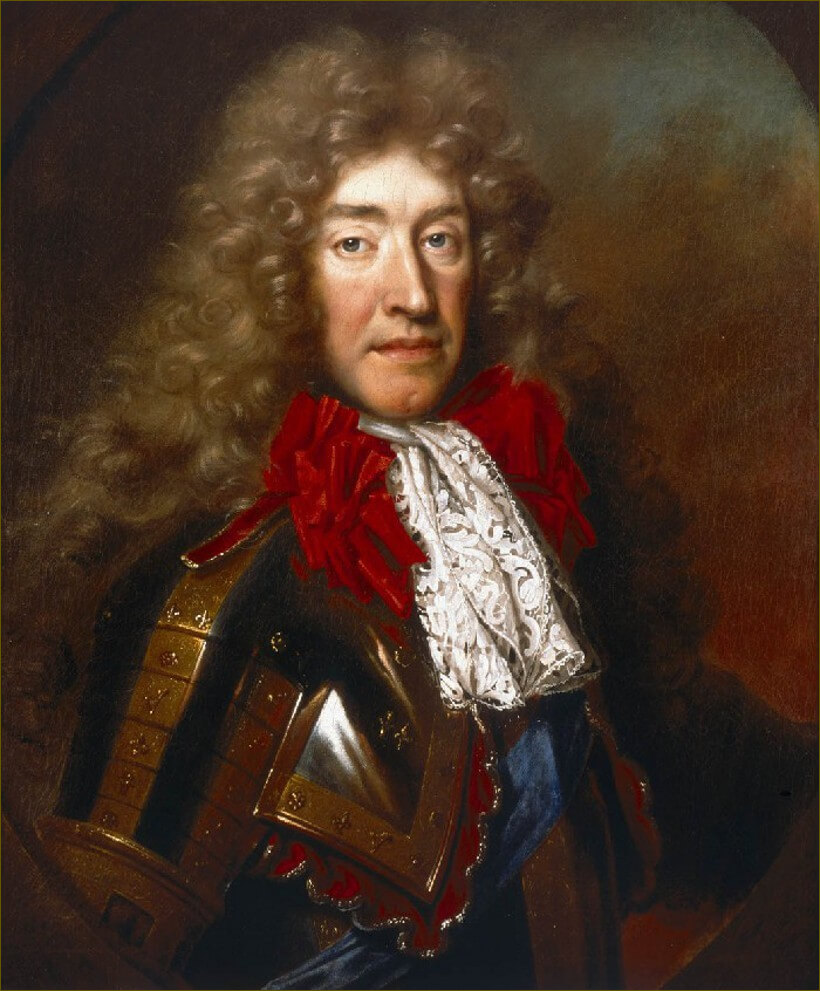
Mary's father, James II and VII, was the last Catholic monarch in Britain. Portrait by Nicolas de Largillière, c. 1686.

Upon the death of Charles II without legitimate issue in February 1685, the Duke of York became king as James II in England and Ireland and James VII in Scotland. Mary was playing cards when her husband informed her of her father's accession, with the knowledge that she was heir presumptive.

When Charles's illegitimate son, the Duke of Monmouth, assembled an invasion force at Amsterdam, and sailed for Britain, William informed James of the Duke's departure, and ordered English regiments in the Low Countries to return to Britain. To William's relief, Monmouth was defeated, captured and executed, but both he and Mary were dismayed by James's subsequent actions.

James had a controversial religious policy; his attempt to grant freedom of religion to non-Anglicans by suspending acts of Parliament by royal decree was not well received. Mary considered such action illegal, and her chaplain expressed this view in a letter to the archbishop of Canterbury, William Sancroft, on her behalf. She was further dismayed when James refused to help when the Catholic king of France, Louis XIV, invaded Orange and persecuted Huguenot refugees there. In an attempt to damage William, James encouraged his daughter's staff to inform her that William was having an affair with Elizabeth Villiers, the daughter of her childhood governess Frances Villiers. Acting on the information, Mary waited outside Villiers's room and caught her husband leaving it late at night. William denied adultery, and Mary apparently believed and forgave him. Possibly, Villiers and William were not meeting as lovers but to exchange diplomatic intelligence. Mary's staff was dismissed and sent back to Britain.

== Glorious Revolution ==
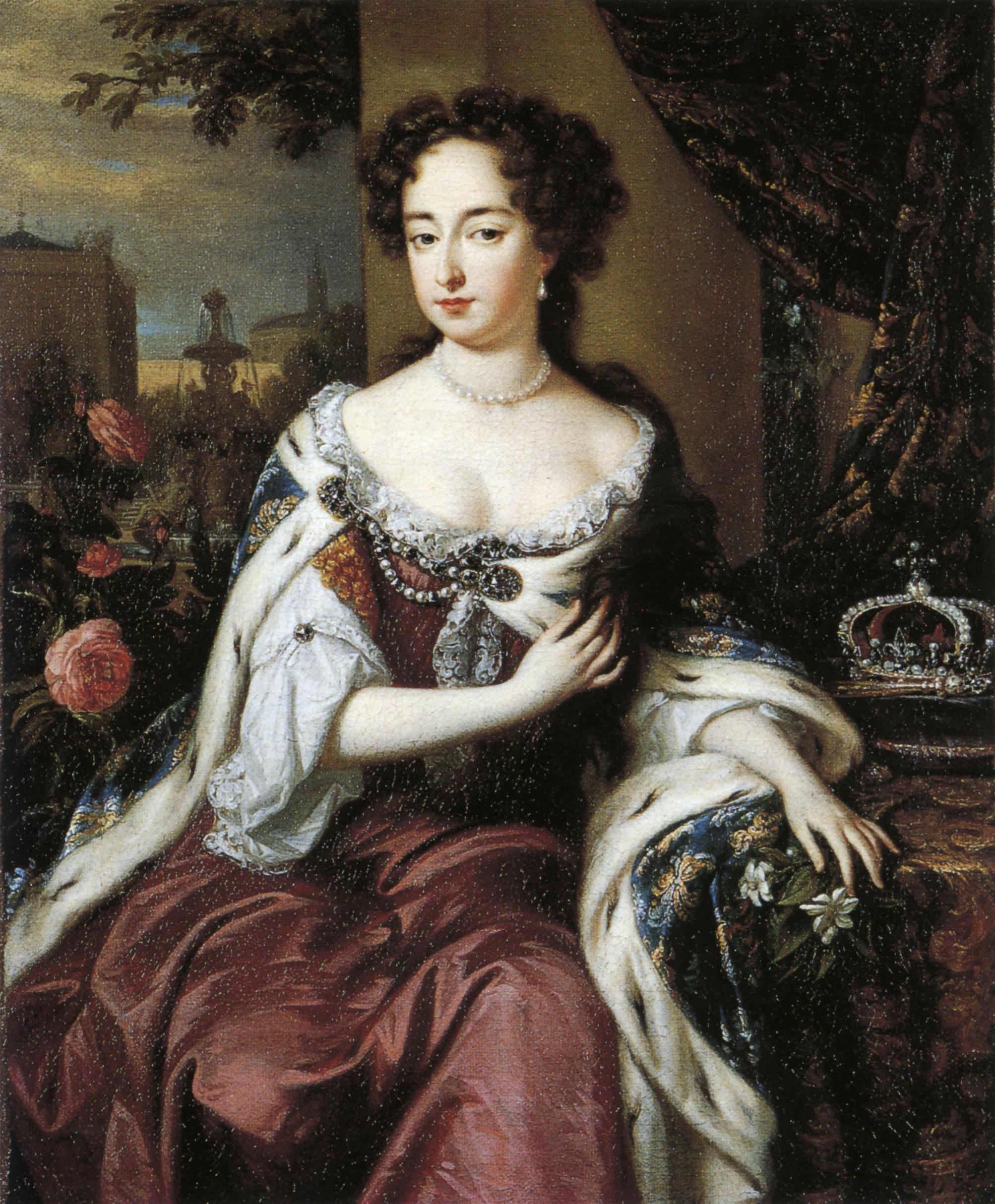
Mary by Jan Verkolje, 1685

Disgruntled Protestant politicians and noblemen were in contact with Mary's husband as early as 1686. After James took the step of forcing Anglican clergymen to read the Declaration of Indulgence—the proclamation granting religious liberty to Catholics and dissenters—from their churches in May 1688, his popularity plunged further. Alarm amongst Protestants increased when his wife, Mary of Modena, gave birth to a son—James Francis Edward—in June 1688, for the son would, unlike Mary and Anne, be raised a Roman Catholic. Some charged that the boy was supposititious, having been secretly smuggled into the Queen's room in a bed-warming pan as a substitute for her stillborn baby. Others thought the father was someone other than James. (Note: Genetic testing of James Francis Edward's descendants has since shown he was indeed a Stuart.) Seeking information, Mary sent a pointed list of questions to her sister, Anne, regarding the circumstances of the birth. Anne's reply, and continued gossip, seemed to confirm Mary's suspicions that the child was not her natural brother, and that her father was conspiring to secure a Catholic succession.

On 30 June, seven notable English nobles, later called "the Immortal Seven" secretly invited William—then in the Dutch Republic with Mary—to come to England with an army to depose James. William may have been jealous of his wife's position as the heiress to the English Crown, but according to Gilbert Burnet, Mary convinced her husband that she did not care for political power, and told him "she would be no more but his wife, and that she would do all that lay in her power to make him king for life". She would, she assured him, always obey her husband as she had promised to do in her marriage vows.

William agreed to invade and issued a declaration which referred to James's newborn son as the "pretended Prince of Wales". He also gave a list of grievances of the English people and stated that his proposed expedition was for the sole purpose of having "a free and lawful Parliament assembled". Having been turned back by storms in October, William and the Dutch army finally landed in England on 5 November 1688, without Mary, who stayed behind in the Netherlands. The disaffected English Army and Navy went over to William, and on 11 December the defeated King James attempted to flee, but was intercepted. A second attempt at flight, on 23 December, was successful; William deliberately allowed James to escape to France, where he lived in exile until his death.

Mary was upset by the circumstances surrounding the deposition of her father, and was torn between concern for him and duty to her husband, but was convinced that her husband's actions, however unpleasant, were necessary to "save the Church and State". When Mary travelled to England after the New Year, she wrote of her "secret joy" at returning to her homeland, "but that was soon checked with the consideration of my father's misfortunes". William ordered her to appear cheerful on their triumphant arrival in London. As a result, she was criticised by Sarah Churchill among others, for appearing cold to her father's plight.

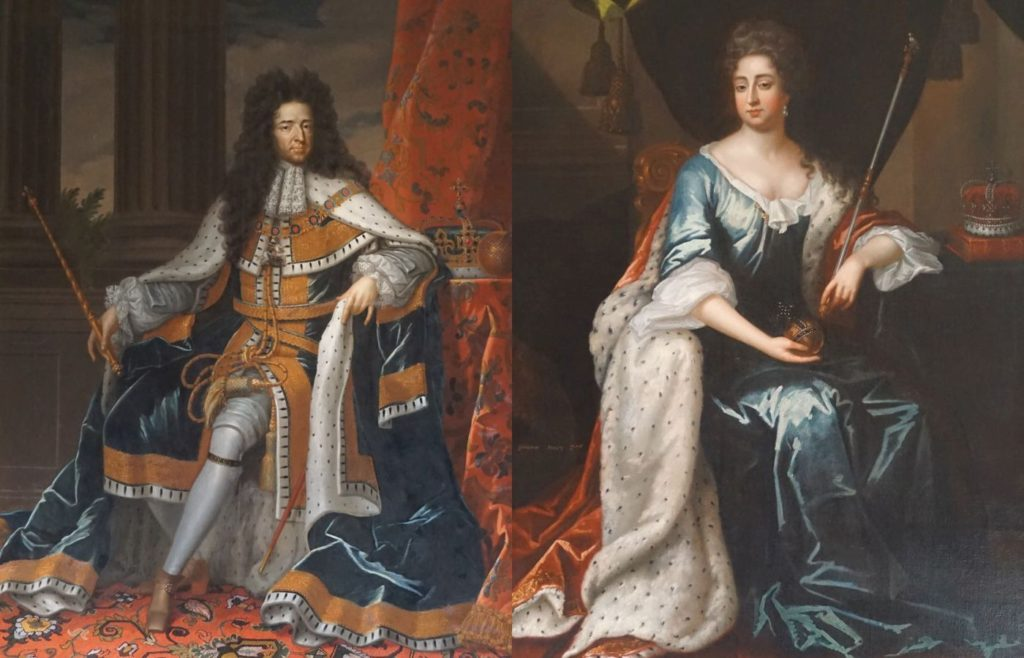
Mary and her husband in coronation robes

In January 1689, a Convention Parliament of England summoned by the Prince of Orange assembled, and much discussion relating to the appropriate course of action ensued. A party led by Lord Danby held that Mary should be sole monarch, as the rightful hereditary heir, while William and his supporters were adamant that a husband could not be subject to his wife. William wished to reign as a king, rather than function as a mere consort of a queen. For her part, Mary did not wish to be queen regnant, believing that women should defer to their husbands, and "knowing my heart is not made for a kingdom and my inclination leads me to a retired quiet life".

On 13 February 1689, the English Parliament passed the Declaration of Right, in which it deemed that James, by attempting to flee on 11 December 1688, had abdicated the government of the realm, and that the Throne had thereby become vacant. Parliament offered the Crown not to James's son, who would have been the heir apparent under normal circumstances, but to William and Mary as joint sovereigns. The only precedent for a joint monarchy dated from the sixteenth century: when Queen Mary I married Philip of Spain, it was agreed that the latter would take the title of king, but only during his wife's lifetime, and restrictions were placed on his power. William, however, would be king even after his wife's death, and "the sole and full exercise of the regal power [would be] executed by the said Prince of Orange in the names of the said Prince and Princess during their joint lives." The declaration was later extended to exclude not only James and his heirs (other than Anne) from the throne, but all Catholics, since "it hath been found by experience that it is inconsistent with the safety and welfare of this Protestant kingdom to be governed by a papist prince".

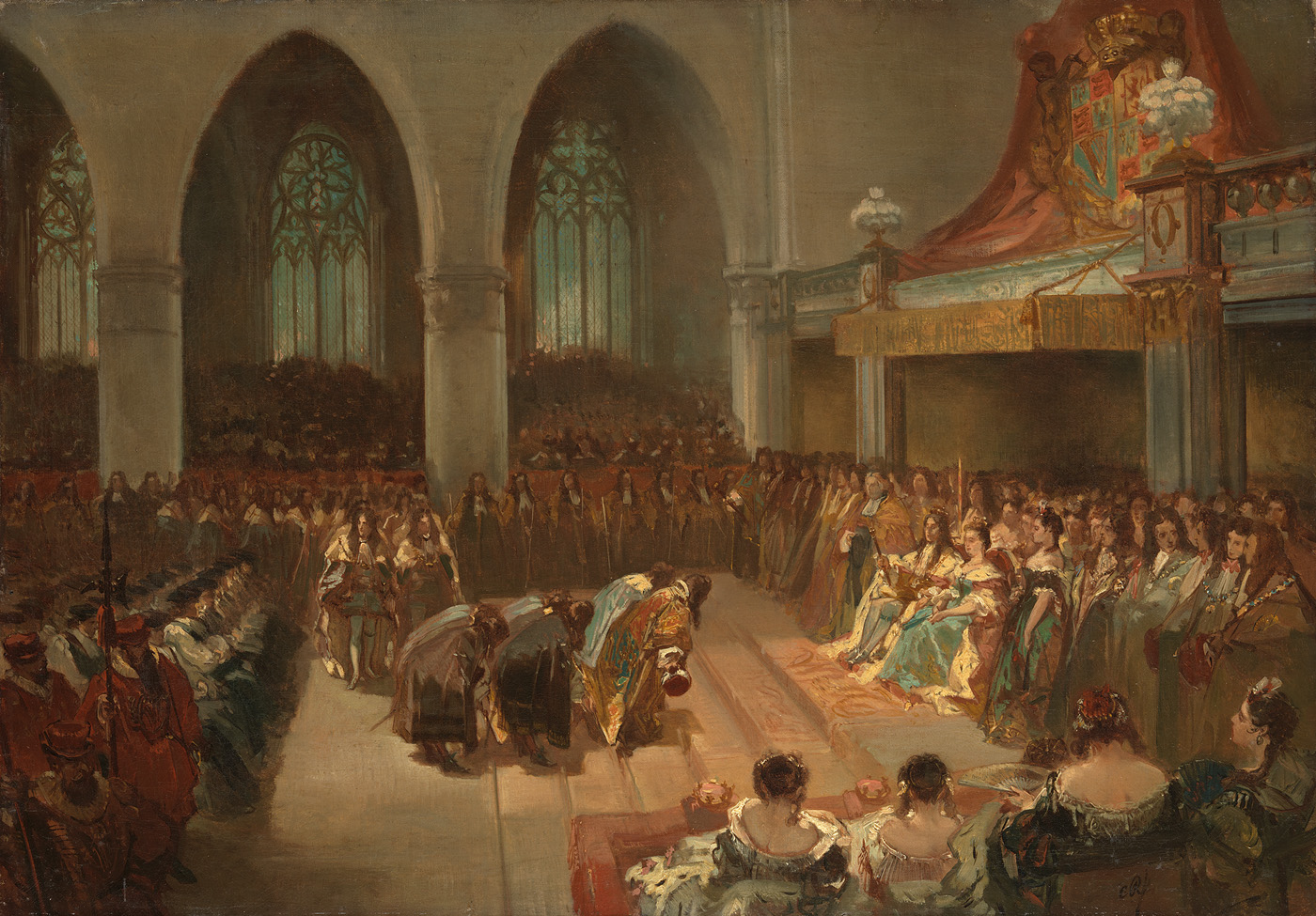
The coronation of William and Mary, 1689

The bishop of London, Henry Compton (one of the "Immortal Seven"), crowned William and Mary together at Westminster Abbey on 11 April 1689. Normally, the archbishop of Canterbury performs coronations, but the incumbent archbishop, William Sancroft, although an Anglican, refused to recognise the validity of James II's removal. Neither William nor Mary enjoyed the ceremony; she thought it "all vanity" and William called it "Popish".

On the same day, the Convention of the Estates of Scotland—which was much more divided than the English Parliament—finally declared that James was no longer King of Scotland, that "no Papist can be King or Queen of this Realm", that William and Mary would be joint sovereigns, and that William would exercise sole and full power. The following day, they were proclaimed king and queen in Edinburgh. They took the Scottish coronation oath in London on 11 May. Even after the declaration, there was still substantial support for James from the Nonjuring schism in all three kingdoms, particularly in parts of Scotland. Viscount Dundee raised an army in the Scottish Highlands and won a convincing victory at Killiecrankie on 27 July. The huge losses suffered by Dundee's troops, however, coupled with his fatal wounding, served to remove the only effective resistance to William and the uprising was quickly crushed, suffering a resounding defeat by Scottish Covenanters the next month at the Battle of Dunkeld.

== Reign ==
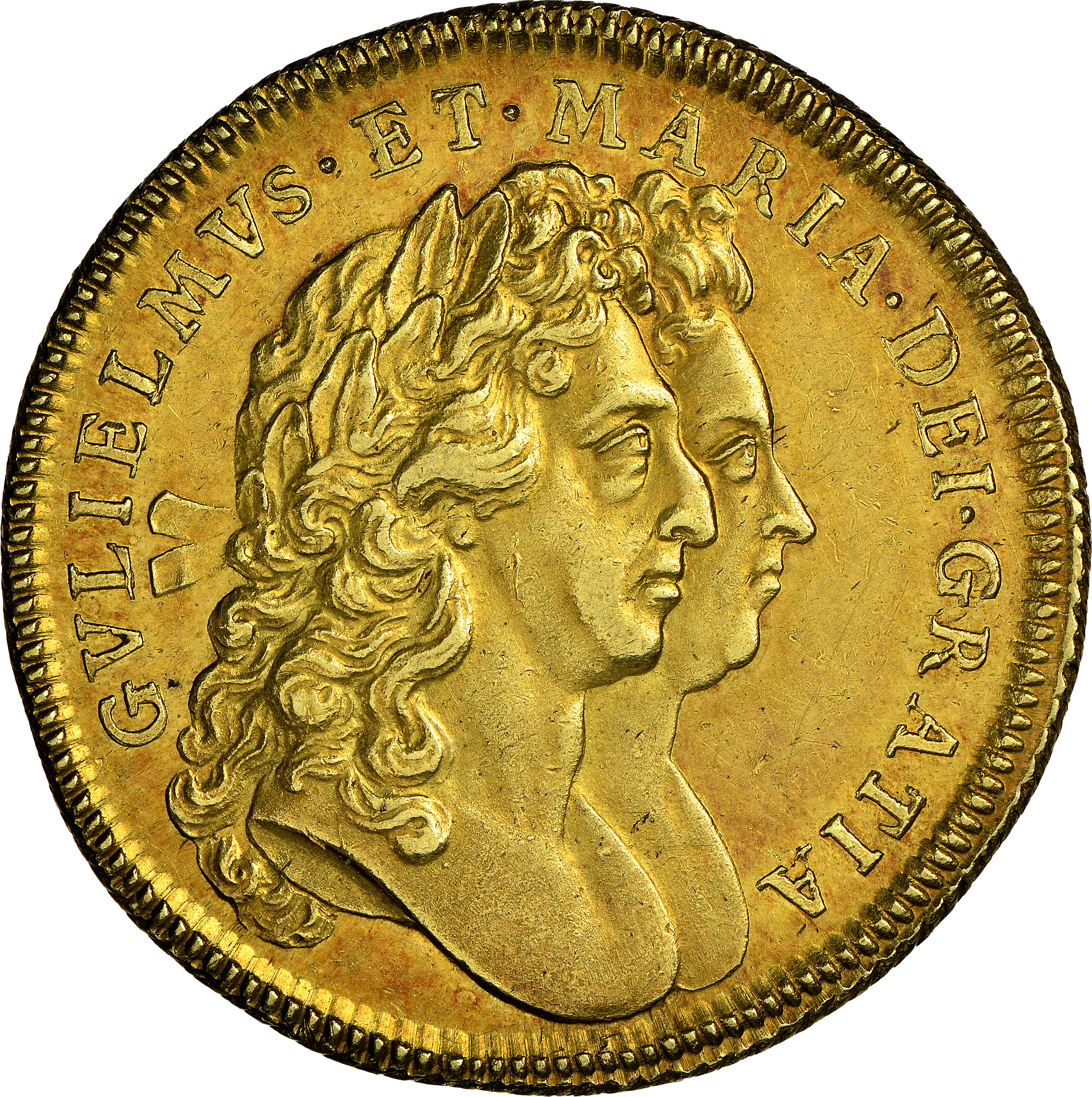
William and Mary on a five guinea coin of 1692

In December 1689, Parliament passed the Bill of Rights. This measure—which restated and confirmed many provisions of the earlier Declaration of Right—established restrictions on the royal prerogative; it declared, among other things, that the Sovereign could not suspend laws passed by Parliament, levy taxes without parliamentary consent, infringe the right to petition, raise a standing army during peacetime without parliamentary consent, deny the right to bear arms to Protestant subjects, unduly interfere with parliamentary elections, punish members of either House of Parliament for anything said during debates, require excessive bail, or inflict cruel or unusual punishments. The Bill of Rights also confirmed the succession to the throne. Following the death of either William III or Mary II, the other was to continue to reign. Next in the line of succession would be any children of the couple, to be followed by Mary's sister Anne and her children. Last in the line of succession stood any children William III might have had from any subsequent marriage.

From 1690 onwards, William was often absent from England on campaign, each year generally from the spring until the autumn. In 1690, he fought Jacobites (who supported James) in Ireland. William had crushed the Irish Jacobites by 1692, but he continued with campaigns abroad to wage war against France in the Netherlands. Whilst her husband was away, Mary administered the government of the realm with the advice of a nine-member Cabinet Council. She was not keen to assume power and felt "deprived of all that was dear to me in the person of my husband, left among those that were perfect strangers to me: my sister of a humour so reserved that I could have little comfort from her." Anne had quarrelled with William and Mary over money, and the relationship between the two sisters had soured.

When her husband was away, Mary acted on her own if his advice was not available; whilst he was in England, Mary completely refrained from interfering in political matters, as had been agreed in the Declaration and Bill of Rights, and as she preferred. However, she proved a firm ruler, ordering the arrest of her own uncle, Henry Hyde, 2nd Earl of Clarendon, for plotting to restore James II to the throne. In January 1692, the influential John Churchill, 1st Earl of Marlborough, was dismissed on similar charges; the dismissal somewhat diminished her popularity and further harmed her relationship with her sister Anne (who was strongly influenced by Churchill's wife, Sarah). Anne appeared at court with Sarah, obviously supporting the disgraced Churchill, which led to Mary angrily demanding that Anne dismiss Sarah and vacate her lodgings.

Mary fell ill with a fever in April 1692, and missed Sunday church service for the first time in 12 years. She also failed to visit Anne, who was suffering a difficult labour. After Mary's recovery and the death of Anne's baby soon after it was born, Mary did visit her sister, but chose the opportunity to berate Anne for her friendship with Sarah. The sisters never saw each other again. Marlborough was arrested and imprisoned, but then released after his accuser was revealed to be an impostor. Mary recorded in her journal that the breach between the sisters was a punishment from God for the "irregularity" of the Revolution. She was extremely devout, and attended prayers at least twice a day.

Many of Mary's proclamations focus on combating licentiousness, insobriety and vice. She often participated in the affairs of the Church—all matters of ecclesiastical patronage passed through her hands. On the death of Archbishop of Canterbury John Tillotson in December 1694, Mary was keen to appoint Bishop of Worcester Edward Stillingfleet to the vacancy, but William overruled her and the post went to Bishop of Lincoln Thomas Tenison.

=== Arts ===
Mary set new trends in interior design across Britain but also reflected her sophisticated taste and commitment to elevating the cultural landscape of her time. In addition to collecting delftware and East Asian porcelain, Mary commissioned renowned court painters to create a series of notable works, including a celebrated collection of royal beauties. This artistic endeavour visually linked her reign to the legacy of earlier Stuart monarchs, reinforcing her position in history. Her collaboration with architects led to the redesign of palace interiors, while her passion for landscape gardening introduced botanical styles to England.

Mary was also a notable and engaged supporter of music, particularly remembered for her connection with the Baroque composer Henry Purcell. He created several birthday odes for her, including the famous "Come, ye Sons of Art" and composed music for her funeral. Mary's love for music extended to her role in the Church of England, where she actively contributed to the flourishing of sacred music during her reign, commissioning new anthems for royal ceremonies. Unlike her husband, who was more focused on military and political matters, Mary had a deep appreciation for the arts, regularly supporting various musicians and composers throughout her life.

=== Death ===
Mary was tall (5 foot 11 inches; 180 cm) and apparently fit; she regularly walked between her palaces at Whitehall and Kensington, and it appeared likely she would outlive her husband and sister, both of whom suffered from ill health. In late 1694, however, she contracted smallpox. She sent away anyone who had not previously had the disease, to prevent the spread of infection. Anne, who was once again pregnant, sent Mary a letter saying she would run any risk to see her sister again, but the offer was declined by Mary's groom of the stool, the Countess of Derby. Several days into her illness, the smallpox lesions reportedly disappeared, leaving her skin smooth and unmarked, and Mary said that she felt improved. Her attendants initially hoped she had been ill with measles rather than smallpox, and that she was recovering. But the rash had "turned inward", a sign that Mary was suffering from a usually fatal form of smallpox, and her condition quickly deteriorated. Mary died at Kensington Palace shortly after midnight on the morning of 28 December, at the age of 32.

William, who had grown increasingly to rely on Mary, was devastated by her death, and told Burnet that "from being the happiest" he was "now going to be the miserablest creature on earth". While the Jacobites considered her death divine retribution for breaking the fifth commandment ("honour thy father"), she was widely mourned in Britain. During a cold winter, in which the Thames froze, her embalmed body lay in state in Banqueting House, Whitehall. On 5 March, she was buried at Westminster Abbey. Her funeral service was the first of any royal attended by all the members of both Houses of Parliament. For the ceremony, composer Henry Purcell wrote Music for the Funeral of Queen Mary.

== Legacy ==
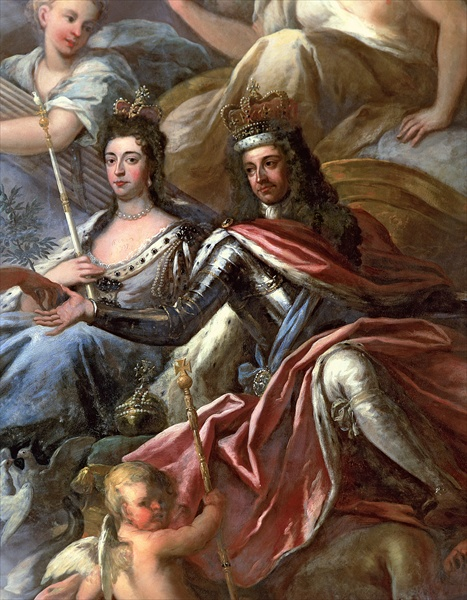
William and Mary depicted on the ceiling of the Painted Hall, Greenwich, by James Thornhill

Mary endowed the College of William and Mary in Virginia in 1693, supported Thomas Bray, who founded the Society for Promoting Christian Knowledge, and was instrumental in the foundation of the Royal Hospital for Seamen, Greenwich, after the Anglo-Dutch victory at the Battle of La Hougue. She is credited with influencing garden design at Het Loo and Hampton Court Palaces, and with popularising blue and white porcelain and the keeping of goldfish as pets.

Mary was depicted by Jacobites as an unfaithful daughter who destroyed her father for her own and her husband's gain. In the early years of their reign, she was often seen as completely under the spell of her husband, but after she had temporarily governed alone during his absences abroad, she was portrayed as capable and confident. Nahum Tate's A Present for the Ladies (1692) compared her to Queen Elizabeth I. Her modesty and diffidence were praised in works such as A Dialogue Concerning Women (1691) by William Walsh, which compared her to Cincinnatus, the Roman general who took on a great task when called to do so, but then willingly abandoned power.

A week before her death, Mary went through her papers, weeding out some, which were burnt, but her journal survives, as do her letters to William and to Frances Apsley. The Jacobites lambasted her, but the assessment of her character that came down to posterity was largely the vision of Mary as a dutiful, submissive wife, who assumed power reluctantly, exercised it with considerable ability when necessary, and willingly deferred it to her husband.

== Title, styles and arms ==
- 30 April 1662 – 4 November 1677: Her Highness The Lady Mary
- 4 November 1677 – 13 February 1689: Her Highness or Her Royal Highness The Princess of Orange
- 13 February 1689 – 28 December 1694: Her Majesty The Queen

The joint style of William III and Mary II was "William and Mary, by the Grace of God, King and Queen of England, France and Ireland, Defenders of the Faith, etc." when they ascended the English throne. From 11 April 1689—when the Estates of Scotland recognised them as sovereigns—the royal couple used the style "William and Mary, by the Grace of God, King and Queen of England, Scotland, France and Ireland, Defenders of the Faith, etc.".

The coat of arms used by William and Mary were: Quarterly, I and IV Grandquarterly, Azure three fleurs-de-lis Or (for France) and Gules three lions passant guardant in pale Or (for England); II Or a lion rampant within a double tressure flory-counter-flory Gules (for Scotland); III Azure a harp Or stringed Argent (for Ireland); overall an escutcheon Azure billetty a lion rampant Or (for the House of Orange-Nassau).

Coats of arms of Mary II

Coat of arms on expeditionary banner of William and Mary, 1688, showing their arms impaled.

Coat of arms of William and Mary as joint sovereigns of England.

Coat of arms of William and Mary used in Scotland from 1691.

== Genealogical table ==
The British monarchs of the House of Stuart, their relations, and the transition to the Hanovers

James V 1512–1542 r. 1513–1542	Christian III of Denmark; 1503–1559
Mary, Queen of Scots; 1542–1587 r. 1542–1567	Frederick II of Denmark; 1534–1588	Dorothea of Denmark; 1546–1617
James VI and I 1566–1625 r. 1567/1603–1625	Anne of Denmark; 1574–1619	George, Duke of Brunswick-Calenberg; 1582–1641
Henrietta Maria of France; 1609–1669	Charles I 1600–1649 r. 1625–1649	Elizabeth Stuart, Queen of Bohemia; 1596–1662
HANOVER
Charles II; 1630–1685 r. 1660–1685	Mary, Princess Royal and Princess of Orange; 1631–1660	Anne Hyde; 1637–1671	James II and VII; 1633–1701 r. 1685–1688	Mary of Modena; 1658–1718	Sophia of Hanover; 1630–1714	Ernest Augustus, Elector of Hanover; 1629–1698
James Scott, Duke of Monmouth (illegitimate); 1649–1685	William III; 1650–1702 r. 1689–1702	Mary II; 1662–1694 r. 1689–1694	Anne; 1665–1714 r. 1702–1714	James Francis Edward Stuart "the Old Pretender"; 1688–1766	Louisa Maria Stuart; 1692–1712	George I 1660–1727 r. 1714–1727
(no children)	Prince William, Duke of Gloucester; 1689–1700	Charles Edward Stuart "the Young Pretender"; 1720–1788	Henry Benedict Stuart "Cardinal Duke of York"; 1725–1807	George II; 1683–1760 r. 1727–1760

== Notes ==
Mary II House of Stuart Born: 30 April 1662 Died: 28 December 1694
Regnal titles
Vacant Glorious Revolution Title last held by James II & VII	Queen of England, Scotland and Ireland; 1689–1694 with William III & II	Succeeded by William III & II as sole monarch
