= William VII of Chalon-Arlay =

Prince of Orange

William VII lord of Arlay, prince of Orange
- Coat of arms of Chalon (red shield with yellow ribbon) and Orange (blue bugle); over all the (claimed) county of Geneva.
- Died: 1475
- Noble family: House of Chalon-Arlay
- Spouse: Catherine of Brittany
- Issue: John IV lord of Arlay, prince of Orange
- Father: Louis II lord of Arlay
- Mother: Johanna of Montfaucon

William VII of Chalon (born c. 1415, died 1475) was a prince of Orange and lord of Arlay. He was the son of Louis II lord of Arlay and his wife Johanna of Montfaucon.

He was married to Catherine of Brittany, the sister of Francis II, Duke of Brittany. Together, they had one son, John IV of Chalon, who succeed his father to the title in 1475.

William VII of Chalon-Arlay House of Chalon-Arlay
Preceded by Louis II	Prince of Orange; 1463–1475	Succeeded by John IV
