= Louis II of Chalon-Arlay =

Louis II lord of Arlay
- Coat of arms of Chalon (red shield with yellow ribbon) and Orange (blue bugle); over all the (claimed) county of Geneva.
- Born: c. 1388
- Died: 3 December 1463; Nozeroy
- Noble family: House of Chalon-Arlay
- Spouses: Johanna of Montfaucon; Eléonore of Armagnac
- Issue: William VII lord of Arlay; Louis de Chalon; Hugh de Chalon
- Father: John III lord of Arlay
- Mother: Mary of Baux-Orange

Louis II of Chalon-Arlay (c. 1388 – 3 December 1463), nicknamed the Good, was Lord of Arlay and Arguel Prince of Orange. He was the son of John III of Chalon-Arlay and his wife, Mary of Baux-Orange, and the father of William VII of Chalon-Arlay. In 1421, he was appointed the Imperial vicar of Burgundy by the Holy Roman Emperor Sigismund.

Louis was very ambitious. He tried to establish his authority in the Dauphiné, but failed. He did manage to extend his territory eastwards, to Neuchâtel and Lausanne. During his attempts to extend his territory, he would sometimes express loyalty towards the King of France, and at other times toward the Emperor Sigismund, or the Duke of Burgundy. In the end, nobody really trusted him.

Louis was also active in the Netherlands: in 1425, he led an army sent by Philip the Good to support Duke John IV of Brabant in a war against his wife Jacqueline.

Louis also called himself Count of Geneva, claiming it was part of the inheritance he had received from his mother. However, he was never able to realize this claim. The county of Geneva was held by Antipope Felix V. After Felix's death, Louis fought a long battle against the Counts of Savoy for control of Geneva. The struggle ended when the Emperor decided in favour of the House of Savoy.

In his last will and testament, Louis stipulated that his children from his second marriage would take precedence over his children from his first marriage when in the division of the inheritance. After his death, this caused a prolonged struggle between his children and their descendants.

Louis married Johanna (d. 1445), the daughter of Count Henry II of Montbéliard and Marie of Châtillon. They had:

1. William VII (d. 1475), his successor as Prince of Orange

Louis married, secondly, Eléonore (1423–1456), daughter of Count John IV of Armagnac and Isabella of Navarre. They had:

1. Louis, Lord of Chateau-Guyon (1448–1476) and Knight of the Order of the Golden Fleece
2. Hugh de Chalon (-3 July 1490), Lord of Château-Guyon, who married Louise of Savoy, a daughter of Duke Amadeus IX of Savoy and Yolande of Valois.
3. Philippine de Chalon, a nun at Ste-Clarisse d'Orbe, d.1507
4. Jeanne de Chalon, d.15 Sep 1483; m.25 Mar 1472 Louis de Seyssel, Cte de la Chambre (d.15 Sep 1483)

Louis II died at his castle at Nozeroy on 3 December 1463. He was succeeded as Prince of Orange by his son William VII.

== Sources ==
- Vaughan, Robert (2002) [1970]. Philip the Good: The Apogee of Burgundy (2nd ed.). Woodbridge: The Boydell Press.
- Frédéric Barbey, Louis de Chalon, Prince d'Orange, in the series Mémoires et documents publiés par la Société d'histoire de la Suisse romande, 2nd series, vol. XIII, Lausanne, Librairie Payot, 1926
- J.K.H. de Roo van Alderwerelt: De voorgeschiedenis van het wapen gevoerd door de eerste prins van Orange uit het geslacht van de graven van Nassau, in: Jaarboek van het Centraal Bureau voor Genealogie, part XXV, 1971

Louis II of Chalon-Arlay House of Chalon-Arlay Born: c. 1388 Died: 3 December 1463
Preceded by John III	Prince of Orange; 1418-1463	Succeeded by William VII
