= Chinon (disambiguation) =

Chinon may refer to

- a town in France, see Chinon
- a castle in Chinon, France, see Château de Chinon
- a wine from the vineyards around the town of Chinon in Loire Valley, see Chinon (AOC)
- Château-Chinon (disambiguation), two communes of the Nièvre département, in France.
- Chinon Industries, Japanese camera manufacturer.

Not to be confused with:

- Quinone - a class of organic compounds. (Chinon is the German and Polish term for one unspecific molecule from among the quinones.)
