= Hugh I of Chalon-Arlay =

Hugh I lord of Arlay
- Coat-of-arms of Chalon-Arlay
- Born: 1288
- Died: 1322 (aged 33–34)
- Noble family: House of Chalon-Arlay
- Spouse: Beatrice de La Tour-du-Pin
- Issue: John II lord of Arlay
- Father: John I lord of Arlay
- Mother: Marguerite of Burgundy

Hugh I of Chalon-Arlay (1288–1322) was lord of Arlay and of Vitteaux, and belonged to the house of Chalon-Arlay. He was the son of lord John I of Chalon-Arlay and his first wife Marguerite of Burgundy (daughter of duke Hugh IV of Burgundy), and his grandfather John, Count of Chalon was count-regent from the death of Otto III, count of Burgundy onwards. On 13 February 1302 Hugh I married Béatrice de La Tour-du-Pin (1275–1347) (daughter of count Humbert I of Viennois). They had one child

- John II (1312 – 25 February 1362), who succeeded his father to the lordship of Arlay.
