= Mary of Baux-Orange =

Princess regnant of Orange (died 1417)

- Princess of Orange, suo jure
- Died: 1417; Orange
- Noble family: House of Baux (by birth); House of Chalon-Arlay (by marriage)
- Spouse: John III of Chalon-Arlay
- Issue: Louis II
- Father: Raymond V of Baux
- Mother: Joan of Geneva

Mary of Baux-Orange (died 1417) was suo jure Princess of Orange. She was the last holder of this title from the House of Baux.

== Life ==
Marie was the only child and therefore the sole heiress of Raymond V of Baux and Joan of Geneva. On 11 April 1386, she married John III, the son of Louis I, Lord of Chalon-Arlay and Margaret of Vienne. They had:

- Louis II, nicknamed Louis the Good (1390-1463)

Mary died in 1417 in Orange and was buried in L'église des Cordeliers at Lons-le-Saunier. Her husband died in 1418. Louis II inherited Chalon-Arlay from his father and Baux-Orange, including the Principality of Orange, from his mother. He claimed to have also inherited the County of Geneva via his grandmother, but lost a lengthy legal battle over this claim against the House of Savoy.

== See also ==
- Lords of Baux
- Château des Baux
- House of Chalon-Arlay
- Principality of Orange

== Sources ==
- Josso, Carole (2003). "Nozeroy (Jura): architecture civile des XVe et XVIe siècles". In Delobette, Laurence; Delsalle, Paul (eds.). La Franche-Comté à la charnière du Moyen Age et de la Renaissance, 1450-1550 (in French). Presses universitaires Franc-Comtoises. pp. 373–402.
