= Vitteaux =

Commune in Côte-d'Or, Bourgogne-Franche-Comté, France

- Commune
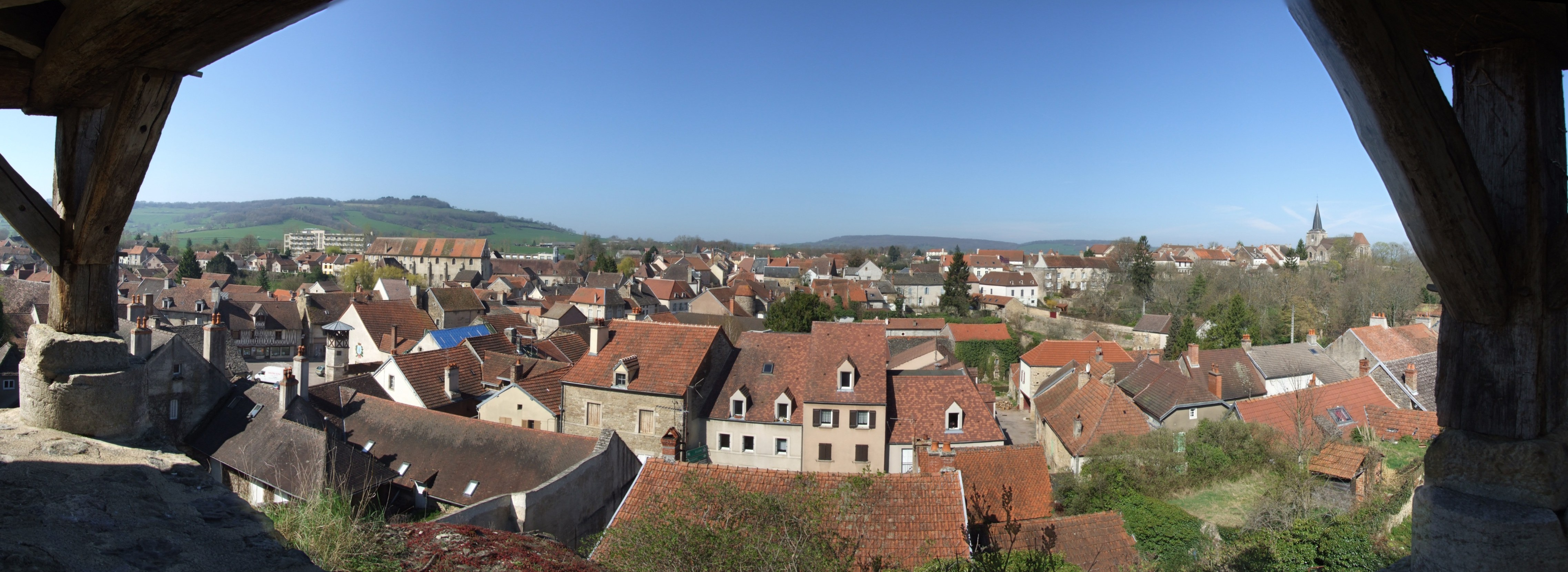
- A general view of Vitteaux

- Coat of arms
- Location of Vitteaux
- Location within France Location within Bourgogne-Franche-Comté
- Coordinates: 47°23′55″N 4°32′33″E
- Country: France
- Region: Bourgogne-Franche-Comté
- Department: Côte-d'Or
- Arrondissement: Montbard
- Canton: Semur-en-Auxois
- Intercommunality: Terres d'Auxois

Government
  - Mayor (2020–2026): Bernard Paut
- Area^{1}: 20.7 km^{2} (8.0 sq mi)
- Highest elevation: 513 m (1,683 ft)
- Lowest elevation: 304 m (997 ft)
- Population (2023): 1,054
  - Density: 50.9/km^{2} (132/sq mi)
- Time zone: UTC+01:00 (CET)
  - Summer (DST): UTC+02:00 (CEST)
- INSEE/Postal code: 21710 /21350
- ^{1} French Land Register data, which excludes lakes, ponds, glaciers > 1 km^{2} (0.386 sq mi or 247 acres) and river estuaries.

Vitteaux (French pronunciation: [vito]) is a commune in the Côte-d'Or department in eastern France.

== Population ==
Historical population
Year	Pop.	±% p.a.
1968	1,052	—
1975	1,077	+0.34%
1982	1,097	+0.26%
1990	1,064	−0.38%
1999	1,114	+0.51%
2007	1,098	−0.18%
2012	1,084	−0.26%
2017	1,074	−0.19%
2023	1,054	−0.31%
Source: INSEE

== See also ==
- Communes of the Côte-d'Or department
