= Château-Chinon =

Château-Chinon is the name of two communes of the Nièvre département, in France:

- Château-Chinon (Ville)
- Château-Chinon (Campagne)

The two towns are neighboring each other. They were separated during the French Revolution.

== See also ==
- Chinon (disambiguation)
