= Prince of Orange =

Title originated from the Principality of Orange

Coat of arms of the Prince of Orange (1815–1884)

Coat of arms of the counts of Orange of the first house of Orange. It came to stand for the principality of Orange. The homophony of the town's name with the fruit is a coincidence. The bugle-horn, supposedly derived from the first prince's surname "au Courb-nez" (curved-nosed or perhaps short-nosed), transformed into "au cornet" (with the bugle).

Coat of arms of the city of Orange in the Vaucluse. They were granted to the city by the princes of Orange of the house of des Baux in the last quarter of the 12th century.

Prince of Orange or Princess of Orange (Dutch: Prins(es) van Oranje) is a title usually held by the heirs apparent to the throne of the Netherlands. It arose as a feudal title in the middle ages with the sovereign Principality of Orange, in what is now southern France, and was later held by the stadtholders of the Netherlands.

The title "Prince of Orange" was created in 1163 by Holy Roman Emperor Frederick Barbarossa, by elevating the county of Orange to a principality, in order to bolster his support in that area in his conflict with the Papacy. The title and land passed to the French noble houses of Baux, in 1173, and of Chalons, in 1393, before arriving with René of Nassau in 1530. The principality then passed to René's cousin, the German-born nobleman from then Spanish Netherlands, William (known as "the Silent"), in 1544. Subsequently, William led a successful Dutch revolt against Spain; however, with independence, the new country became a decentralised republic rather than a unitary monarchy.

In 1702, after William the Silent's great-grandson William III of England died without children, a dispute arose between his cousins, Johan Willem Friso and Frederick I of Prussia. In 1713, under the Treaty of Utrecht Frederick William I of Prussia ceded the Principality of Orange to King Louis XIV of France (while retaining the title as part of his dynastic titulature). In 1732, under the Treaty of Partition, Friso's son, William IV agreed to share use of the title "Prince of Orange" (which had accumulated prestige in the Netherlands and throughout the Protestant world) with Frederick William.

With the 19th century emergence of the Kingdom of the Netherlands, the title has been traditionally borne by the heir apparent of the Dutch monarch. Although originally only borne by men, since 1983 the title descends via absolute primogeniture, which means that the holder can be either Prince or Princess of Orange.

The current Dutch royal dynasty, the House of Orange-Nassau, is not the only family to claim the dynastical title. Rival claims to the title have been made by German emperors and kings of the House of Hohenzollern and by the head of the French noble family of Mailly. The current users of the title are Princess Catharina-Amalia of the Netherlands (Orange-Nassau), Georg Friedrich (of Hohenzollern), and Guy (of Mailly-Nesle).

== History ==
=== County of Orange ===
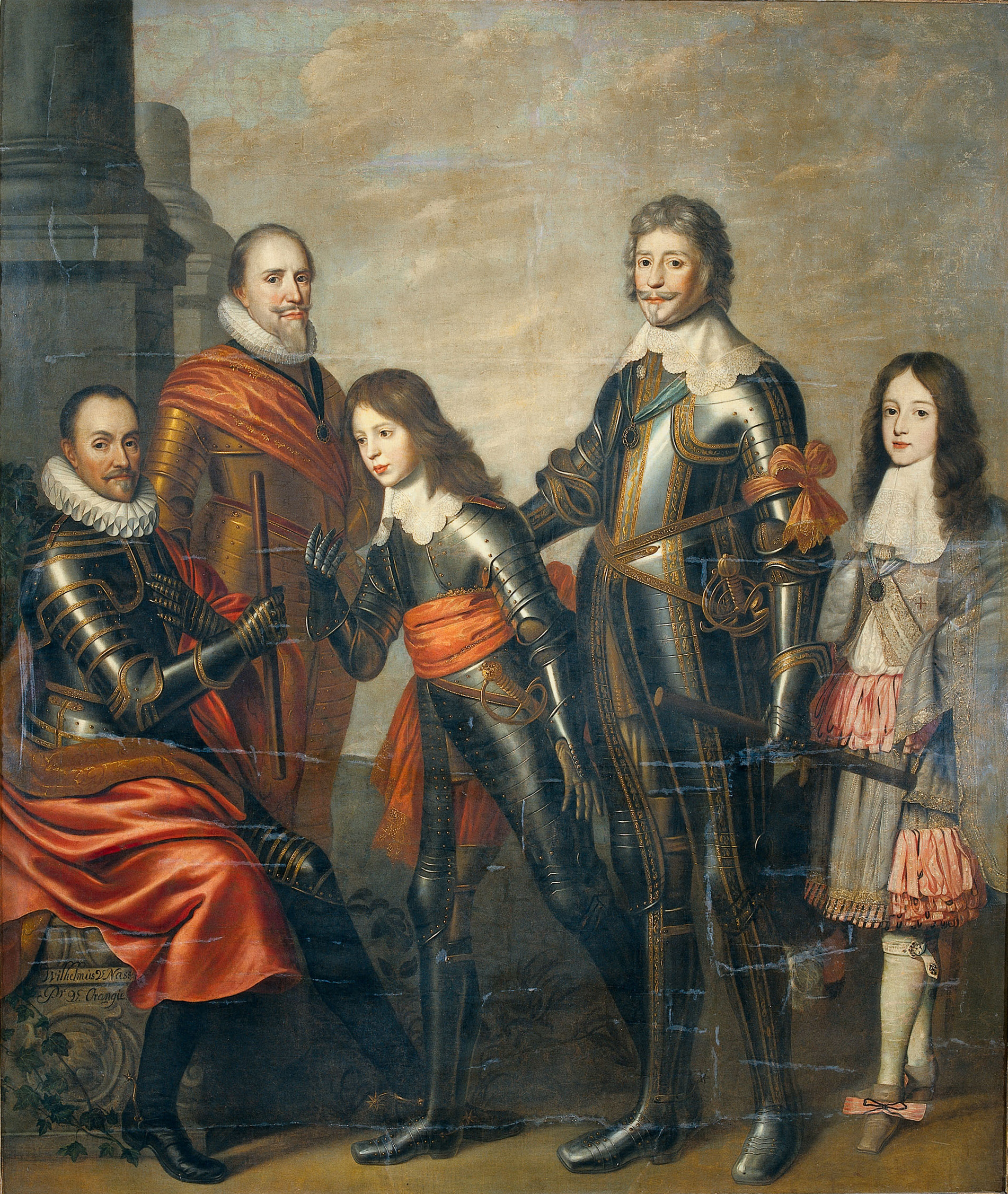
Composite portrait of four generations of Princes of Orange – William I (in role 1544–1584), Maurice (1618–1625) and Frederick Henry (1625–1647), William II (1647–1650), William III (1650–1702) – Willem van Honthorst, 1662

The title referred to Orange in the Vaucluse department in the Rhône valley of southern France, which was a property of the House of Orange, then of the House of Baux and the House of Chalon-Arlay before passing in 1544 to the Dillenburg branch of the House of Nassau, which since then is known as the House of Orange-Nassau.

The Principality originated as the County of Orange, a fief in the Holy Roman Empire, in the Empire's constituent Kingdom of Burgundy. It was awarded to William of Gellone (born 755), a grandson of Charles Martel and therefore a cousin of Charlemagne, around the year 800 for his services in the wars against the Moors and in the reconquest of southern France and the Spanish March. His Occitan name is Guilhem; however, as a Frankish lord, he probably knew himself by the old Germanic version of Wilhelm. William also ruled as count of Toulouse, duke of Aquitaine, and marquis of Septimania.

The horn that came to symbolise Orange when heraldry came in vogue much later in the 12th century represented a pun on William of Gellone's name in French, from the character his deeds inspired in the chanson de geste, the Chanson de Guillaume: "Guillaume au Court-nez" (William the Short-Nosed) or its homophone "Guillaume au Cornet" (William the Horn). The chanson appears to incorporate material relating to William of Gellone's battle at the Orbieu or Orbiel river near Carcassonne in 793 as well as to his seizure of the town of Orange.

=== Principality of Orange ===
As the kingdom of Burgundy fragmented in the early Middle Ages, the Holy Roman Emperor Frederick I Barbarossa elevated the lordship of Orange to a principality in 1163 to shore up his supporters in Burgundy against the Pope and the King of France. As the Empire's boundaries retreated from those of the principality, the prince acceded to the sovereign rights that the Emperor formerly exercised. As William the Silent wrote in his marriage proposal to the uncle of his second wife, the Elector August of Saxony, he held Orange as "my own free property", not as a fief of any suzerain; neither the Pope, nor the Kings of Spain or France. That historical position of honor and reputation would later drive William the Silent forward, as much as it also fuelled the opposition of his great-grandson William III to Louis XIV, when that king invaded and occupied Orange.

The last direct descendant of the original princes, René of Chalon, exercised his sovereign right and left the principality to his cousin William the Silent, who was not a descendant of the original Orange family but the heir to the principality of Orange by testament. This was, however, against the inheritance pattern enacted by the last will of Mary of Baux-Orange, the Princess of Orange from the House of Baux who brought the principality into the Chalons family and through to whom Prince René derived his own inheritance right (see Genealogy of the House of Orange-Chalon). In this way, Rene transmitted his property to his nearest relative, rather than go back several generations to transmit it to now distant cousins.

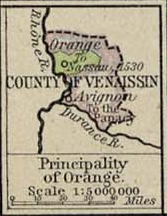
Map of the principality of Orange in the 16th century.

Those now distant cousins were the descendants of Alix de Chalon. Marie des Baux-Orange had stipulated in her will that if her son Louis did not inherit Orange, her daughter Alix and her descendants should. Guillaume de Vienne, seigneur de Saint-Georges, was the husband of Alix. They had a daughter Marguerite, who married in 1449 Rudolf IV, Margrave of Hachberg-Sausenberg, lord of Neuchâtel and Rothelin (1427–87). Their son was Philip of Hachberg-Sausenberg (d. 1503). His only child who reached maturity was Johanna of Hachberg-Sausenberg (d. 1543). She married in 1504 Louis I d'Orléans, duc de Longueville (1450–1516). Through this marriage, the Orléans-Longueville family, an illegitimate branch of the house of Valois, were the claimants of Orange until their extinction in male line in 1694. When William the Silent of Nassau succeeded as prince of Orange, the Orléans-Longueville protested and obtained court decisions in their favour in France. However, as Orange was a sovereign state and not part of France, the courts' decisions were not enforceable and left the principality in the hands of the Nassau-Orange family.

In 1673, Louis XIV of France annexed all territory of the principality to France and to the royal domain, as part of the war actions against the stadtholder William III of Orange—who later became King William III of Great Britain. Orange ceased to exist as a sovereign realm, de facto. Louis then bestowed the titular princedom on Louis Charles de Mailly, marquis de Nesle, whose wife was a direct descendant, and heiress-general by primogeniture, of the original princes of Orange.

After the marquise (who died in 1713), the next holder was Louis of Mailly-Nesle, marquis de Nesle (1689–1764). Although no longer descended from Louis-Charles, a branch of the Mailly family still claim the title today.

In 1714 Louis XIV bestowed the usufruct of the principality on his kinsman, Louis Armand of Bourbon, Prince de Conti, who had a claim on the principality through the claims of the Orléans-Longueville via Alix of Chalon (see above). After his death in 1727 the principality was deemed merged in the Crown by 1731.

After the Treaty of Utrecht in 1713 ceded Orange to France, the following claimants came forward in official protests against the terms of the treaty:

- the house of Luynes or house d'Albert (protest, 14 April 1713)
- the Famille de Goüyon through the elder Matignon branch (protest, 15 April and 2 June 1713)
- Paule-Françoise-Marguerite de Gondi de Retz, duchesse douairière de Lesdiguières, and the house of Villeroy (16 April 1713; also claimants to Neufchatel and Valengin)
- the house of Allegre (protest, 15 April 1713)
- the house of Duprat (protest, 15 April 1713)

However, as the treaty considered Orange to now be conquered by and annexed to France, their protests were ignored.

=== Abolition of the principality, continuation of the title ===
Because William III died without legitimate children, the principality was regarded as having been inherited by his closest cognate relative on the basis of the testament of Frederic-Henry, Frederick I of Prussia, who ceded the principality—at least the lands, but not the formal title—to France in 1713. France supported his claim. In this way, the territory of the principality lost its feudal and secular privileges and became a part of France. The Treaty of Utrecht allowed the King of Prussia to erect part of the Duchy of Guelders (the cities of Geldern, Straelen, and Wachtendonk with their bailiwicks, Krickenbeck, Viersen, the land of Kessel, and the lordships of Afferden, Arcen-Velden-Lomm, Walbeck-Twisteden, Raay and Klein-Kevelaer, Well, Bergen, and Middelaar) into a new Principality of Orange. The kings of Prussia and the German emperors styled themselves Princes of Orange till 1918.

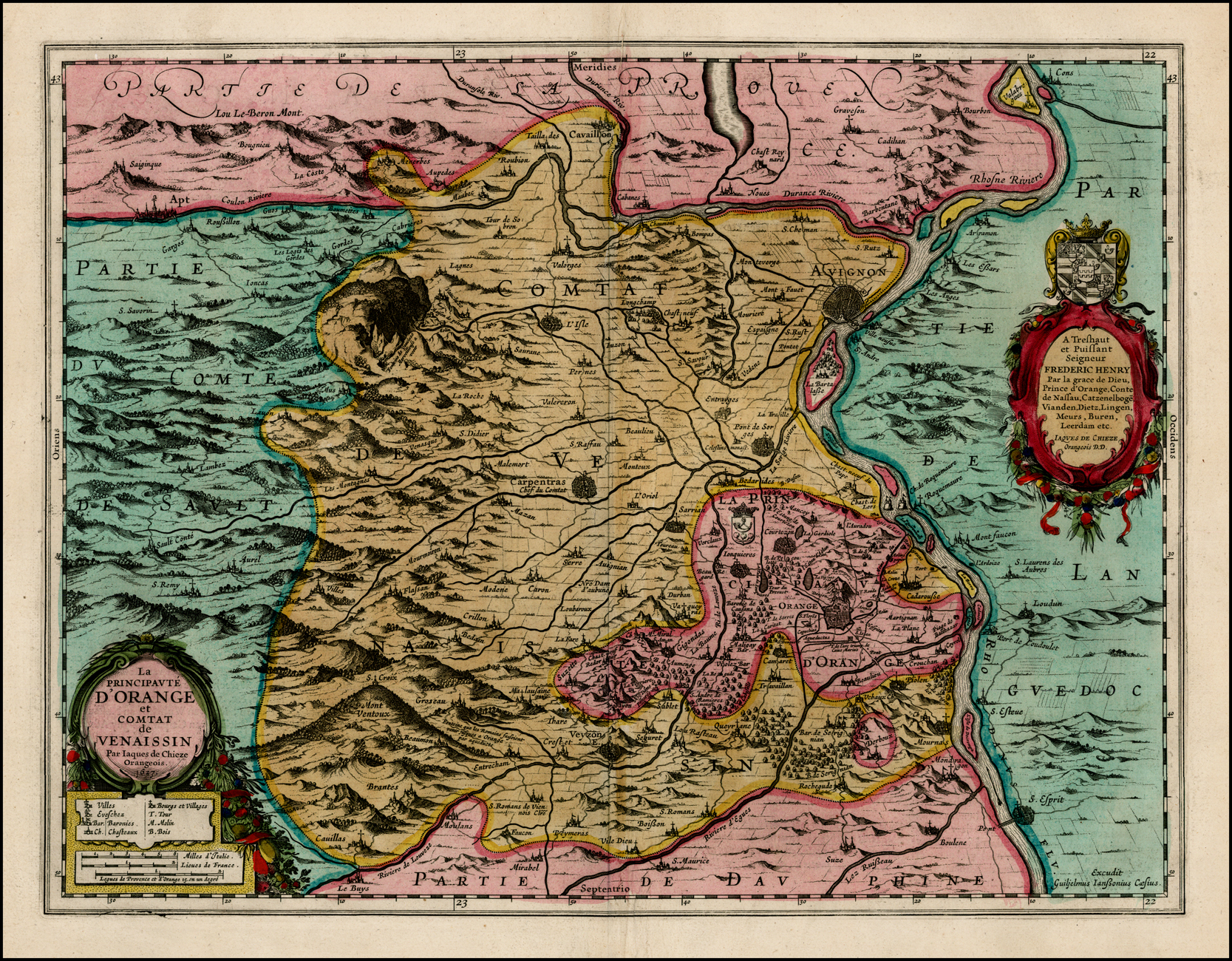
A detailed map of the principality in the first half of the 17th century reproduced from the famous 1627 Atlas of Willem Janszoon Blaeu. The area of the principality was approximately 12 miles long by 9 miles wide, or 108 sq. miles.

An agnatic relative of William III, John William Friso of Nassau, who was also cognatically descended from William the Silent, was designated the heir to the Princes of Orange in the Netherlands by the last will of William III. Several of his descendants became stadtholders. They claim the principality of Orange on the basis of agnatic inheritance, similar to that of William the Silent, who had inherited Orange from his cousin René of Chalon. They did however have a claim, albeit distant, to the principality itself due to John William Friso's descent from Louise de Coligny, who was a descendant of the original Princes of Orange. (Louise's great-grandmother, Anne Pot, Countess of Saint-Pol, was a descendant of Tiburge d'Orange, who married into the des Baux family)

They could also claim descent from the del Balzo, an Italian branch of the des Baux family, via the marriage of Princess Anne to William IV, Prince of Orange. Anne was the eldest daughter of George II of Great Britain, who was a descendant of Elizabeth Woodville, wife of Edward IV of England. Elizabeth Woodville's grandmother was Margherita del Balzo, another descendant of Tiburge d'Orange.

They also claimed on the basis of the testaments of Philip William, Maurice, and William III. Finally, they claimed on the basis that Orange was an independent state whose sovereign had the right to assign his succession according to his will. France never recognised any of this, nor allowed the Orange-Nassaus or the Hohenzollerns to obtain anything of the principality itself. The Oranje-Nassaus nevertheless assumed the title and also erected several of their lordships into a new principality of Orange. From that derivation of the title comes the tradition of the House of Orange-Nassau (originally Nassau-Dietz), the later stadtholders of the Netherlands, and the present-day royal family of the Netherlands, of holding this title. They maintain the tradition of William the Silent and the House of Orange-Nassau.

There are two other claimants to this title:

- The House of Hohenzollern, who reigned in Prussia until 1918
- The House of Mailly-Nesles

== Princes of Orange of the House of Orange-Nassau ==
=== Historical background ===
William the Silent (Willem I) was the first stadtholder of the Dutch Republic and the most significant representative of the House of Orange in the Netherlands. He was count of a portion of the German territory of Nassau and heir to some of his father's fiefs in Holland. William obtained more extensive lands in the Netherlands (the lordship of Breda and several other dependencies) as an inheritance from his cousin René of Chalon, Prince of Orange, when William was only 11 years old. After William's assassination in 1584, the title passed to his son Philip William (who had been held hostage in Spain until 1596), and after his death in 1618, to his second son Maurice, and finally to his youngest son, Frederick Henry.

The title of Prince of Orange became associated with the stadtholder of the Netherlands.

William III (Willem III) was also King of England, Scotland and Ireland, and his legacy is commemorated annually by the Protestant Orange Order. William's mother, Mary, was the daughter of King Charles I of England and therefore a princess of England as well as Princess of Orange by marriage.

William III and Mary II had no legitimate children. After William's death in 1702, his heir in the Netherlands was John William Friso of Nassau-Diez, who assumed the title, King William having bequeathed it to him by testament. The other contender was the King in Prussia, who based his claim to the title on the will of Frederick Henry, William III's grandfather. Eventually, a compromise was reached by which both families were entitled to bear the title of Prince of Orange. By then, it was no more than a title because the principality had been annexed by Louis XIV of France.

Friso's line held it as their principal title during the 18th century. The French army expelled them from the Netherlands in 1795, but on their return, the Prince of Orange became the first sovereign of the Netherlands in 1813.

After the establishment of the current Kingdom of the Netherlands in 1815, the title was partly reconstitutionalised by legislation and granted to the eldest son of King William I of the Netherlands, Prince William, who later became William II of the Netherlands. Since 1983, the heir to the Dutch throne, whether male or female, bears the title Prince or Princess of Orange. The first-born child of the heir to the Dutch throne bears the title Hereditary Prince(ss) of Orange. When her father Willem-Alexander became King of the Netherlands following the abdication of Queen Beatrix, Princess Catharina-Amalia became the Princess of Orange.

=== Style ===
The Prince(ss) of Orange is styled His/Her Royal Highness the Prince(ss) of Orange (Dutch: Zijne/Hare Koninklijke Hoogheid de Prins(es) van Oranje).

During the 15th, 16th and 17th Centuries, the Prince(ss) of Orange was styled His/Her Highness the Prince(ss) of Orange (Dutch: Zijne/Hare Hoogheid de Prins(es) van Oranje), except for William III, who rated the "Royal" (Koninklijke).

=== Arms ===
The princes of Orange in the 16th and 17th century used the following sets of arms. On becoming Prince of Orange, William placed the Chalon-Arlay arms in the centre ("as an inescutcheon") of his father's arms. He used these arms until 1582 when he purchased the marquisate of Veere and Vlissingen. He then used the arms attributed to Frederick Henry, etc. with the arms of the marquisate in the top centre, and the arms of the county of Buren in the bottom centre. Their growing complexity shows how arms are used to reflect the growing political position and royal aspirations of the house of Orange-Nassau.

Coat of arms of René of Chalon as Prince of Orange.

Coat of arms of William the Silent as Prince of Orange until 1582 and his eldest son Philip William

The coat of arms used by Maurice showing the county of Moers (top left centre and bottom right centre) and his mother's arms of Saxony (centre)

The coat of arms used by William the Silent after 1582, Frederick Henry, William II, and William III as Prince of Orange

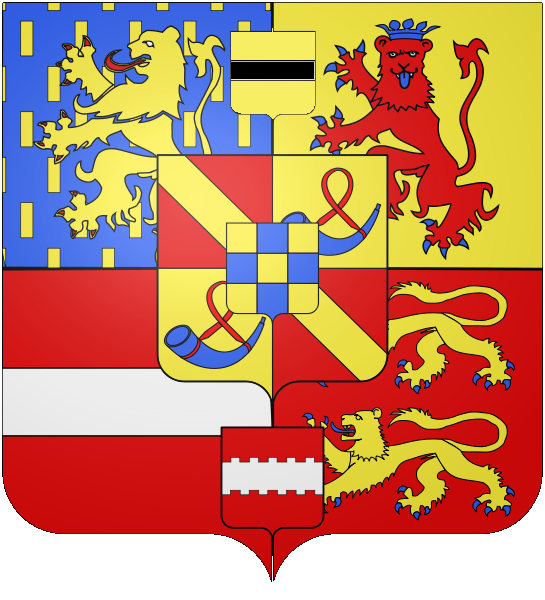
An alternate coat of arms sometimes used by Frederick Henry, William II, and William III as Prince of Orange showing the county of Moers in the top centre rather than Veere.

When William VI of Orange returned to the Netherlands in 1813 and was proclaimed Sovereign Prince of the Netherlands, he quartered the former Arms of the Dutch Republic (1st and 4th quarter) with the "Chalon-Orange" arms (2nd and 3rd quarter), which had come to symbolise Orange. As an in escutcheon he placed his ancestral arms of Nassau. When he became King in 1815, he combined the Dutch Republic Lion with the billets of the Nassau arms and added a royal crown to form the Coat of arms of the Netherlands. In the 19th century, the Dutch Crown prince, who holds the title "Prince of Orange" (Prins van Oranje), and his son, who holds the title "Hereditary Prince of Orange" (Erfprins van Oranje) had their own pre-defined arms. The House of Orange, now the Royal House of the Netherlands, and their descendants the House of Orange-Nassau, kept this title for their family. Wilhelmina further decreed that in perpetuity her descendants should be styled "princes and princesses of Orange-Nassau" and that the name of the house would be "Orange-Nassau" (Dutch: Oranje-Nassau). Since then, individual members of the House of Orange-Nassau are also given their own arms by the reigning monarch, similar to the United Kingdom. This is usually the royal arms, quartered with the arms of the principality of Orange, and an in escutcheon of their paternal arms.

Arms of William VI as sovereign prince of the Netherlands.

Arms of the Dutch Crown prince, the prince of Orange in the 19th Century.

Arms of the son of the Dutch Crown Prince in the 19th Century, who also held the title of Hereditary Prince of Orange.
Juliana of the Netherlands & Oranje-Nassau Personal Arms

Beatrix of the Netherlands & Oranje-Nassau Personal Arms

William Alexander of the Netherlands and Oranje-Nassau Personal Arms

Sons of Princess Margriet of the Netherlands, Pieter van Vollenhoven

As a former territory of the Holy Roman Empire, the princes of Orange used an independent prince's crown. Sometimes, only the coronet part was used (see, here and here). After the establishment of the Kingdom of the Netherlands, they used the Dutch Royal Crowns:

Princely Hat

Princely Crown

Crown for a Prince or Princess of the Netherlands

Crown of a Prince or Princess of Orange-Nassau (Heraldic)

== See also ==
- List of heirs to the Dutch throne
- List of princes and princesses of Orange

== Literature ==
- Herbert H. Rowen, The princes of Orange: the stadholders in the Dutch Republic. Cambridge and New York: Cambridge University Press, 1988.
- John Lothrop Motley, "History of the United Netherlands from the Death of William the Silent to the Synod of Dort". London: John Murray, 1860.
- John Lothrop Motley, "The Life and Death of John of Barenvelt". New York & London: Harper and Brothers Publishing, 1900.
- Petrus Johannes Blok, "History of the people of the Netherlands". New York: G. P. Putnam's sons, 1898.
- Reina van Ditzhuyzen, Het Huis van Oranje: prinsen, stadhouders, koningen en koninginnen. Haarlem : De Haan, [1979].
