= Arlay =

Commune in Bourgogne-Franche-Comté, France

- Commune
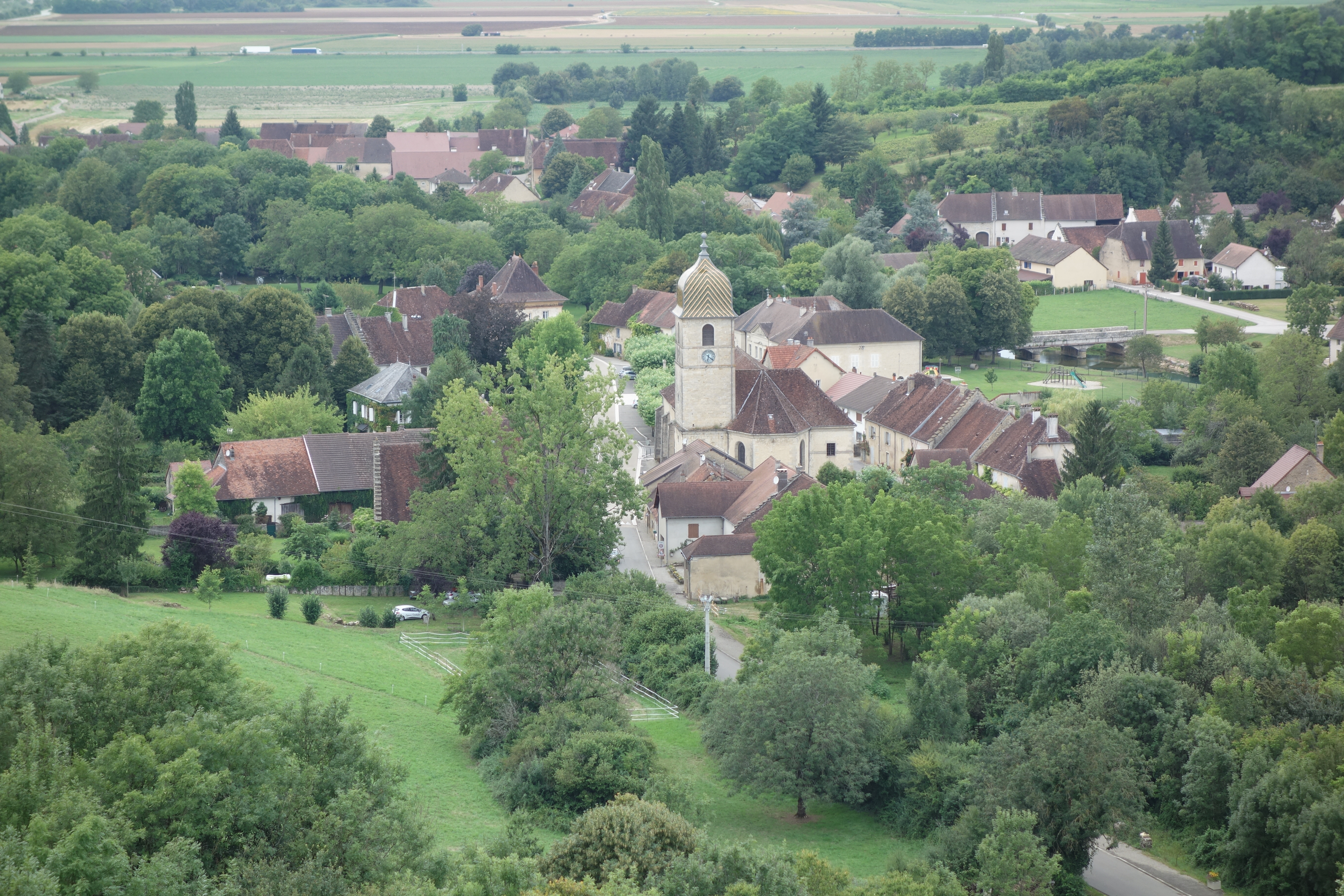
- View on Arlay

- Coat of arms
- Location of Arlay
- Location within France Location within Bourgogne-Franche-Comté
- Coordinates: 46°45′44″N 5°31′47″E
- Country: France
- Region: Bourgogne-Franche-Comté
- Department: Jura
- Arrondissement: Lons-le-Saunier
- Canton: Bletterans
- Intercommunality: CC Bresse Haute Seille

Government
  - Mayor (2020–2026): Christian Bruchon
- Area^{1}: 20.31 km^{2} (7.84 sq mi)
- Highest elevation: 325 m (1,066 ft)
- Lowest elevation: 212 m (696 ft)
- Population (2023): 1,182
  - Density: 58.20/km^{2} (150.7/sq mi)
- Time zone: UTC+01:00 (CET)
  - Summer (DST): UTC+02:00 (CEST)
- INSEE/Postal code: 39017 /39140
- ^{1} French Land Register data, which excludes lakes, ponds, glaciers > 1 km^{2} (0.386 sq mi or 247 acres) and river estuaries.

Arlay is a commune in the Jura department in the region of Bourgogne-Franche-Comté in eastern France. On 1 January 2016, the former commune of Saint-Germain-lès-Arlay was merged into Arlay.

== History ==
Arlay's early importance lay in the fact that it was a station where the "Salt Road" forded the river Seille. It was refounded by the Romans as an oppidum and functioned as a Gallo-Roman city until it was repeatedly laid waste from the third to the fifth century in the barbarian invasions. The presence of Burgundians at the site is testified to by their tombs. Waldalenus, Patrician of Burgundy, had his palatium here at the end of the sixth century, and his son, Donatus, abbot of Luxeuil, established a monastery here, dedicated to Saint Vincent; the abbey church was noted in 654. A hospital associated with the abbey was in existence in the twelfth century.

In the thirteenth century the barony of Arlay, on the borders with the Bresse region, passed into the dynasty of the counts of Chalons, the preeminent noblemen in the south of the Franche-Comté. They controlled the exploitation of salt mined at Salins. Their heirs became Princes of Orange in the early fifteenth century, when Jean III de Chalon-Arlay married the heiress of the Principality of Orange; the title baron of Arlay is still held by Willem-Alexander of the Netherlands.

The castle of Arlay, rebuilt in stone in the ninth to eleventh centuries, was attacked by the French forces of Louis XI and of Henri IV, and was fully destroyed in 1637 by troops of Louis XIII; though the château-fort was reduced to ruins, Arlay and the Franche-Comté did not definitively become French until 1674.

== Population ==
Historical population
Year	Pop.	±% p.a.
1968	874	—
1975	878	+0.07%
1982	1,014	+2.08%
1990	1,129	+1.35%
1999	1,226	+0.92%
2007	1,227	+0.01%
2012	1,227	+0.00%
2017	1,227	+0.00%
2023	1,182	−0.62%
Source: INSEE

Population data refer to the area corresponding with the commune as of January 2025.

== Vineyards ==
The vineyards that surround the ruins of the castle are among the oldest continuously worked vineyards of France, though the label Château d'Arlay (Côtes du Jura AOC), on 30 hectares (74 acres) was only established in 1960, by comte R. de Laguiche.

== Château d'Arlay ==
The eighteenth-century Château d'Arlay was built by the comtesse de Lauraguais, c 1770–80, on the former site of the convent of the Minimes near the foot of the small eminence occupied by the château-fort. Its contents were dispersed at the French Revolution and Mme de Lauraguais died under the guillotine in 1794, but in 1825 the property was assumed by prince Pierre d’Arenberg, grandson of Mme de Lauraguais, who refurnished it with the classical furniture in pale veneers and fruitwoods (bois clair) characteristic of the reign of Charles X, which remain in the house today; in addition to its interior decor, it preserves remains of its park and modern flower gardens.

The caves called the Grottes de Saint-Vincent contain marks of human presence in the Upper Paleolithic Magdalenian epoch.

== See also ==
- Communes of the Jura department
