= Baux =

Baux may refer to:

== People ==
- Antonia of Baux (1355–1374), second Queen consort of Frederick III, King of Sicily
- Auguste Baux (1892–1918), French World War I flying ace credited with five aerial victories
- Barral of Baux
- Bertrand III of Baux
- Cecile of Baux (1230–1275), Countess Consort of Savoy
- Claude Baux (born 1945), French slalom canoeist
- Ercole, Marquis of Baux (1623–1651), member of the House of Grimaldi
- Francis of Baux (1330–1422), first Duke of Andria, Count of Montescaglioso
- House of Baux, French noble family from the south of France
- James of Baux (died 1383), Latin Emperor of Constantinople from 1374 to 1383
- Lords of Baux
- Margaret of Baux (1394–1469), Countess of Saint-Pol
- Marguerite Baux (1856-?), French operatic soprano
- Marquis of Baux, subsidiary title of the Prince of Monaco
- William I of Baux
- William II of Baux
- William III of Baux

== Places ==
- Les Baux-Sainte-Croix, France
- Les Baux-de-Breteuil, France
- Les Baux-de-Provence, France

== Other ==
- Baux score, used to prognosticate in burns
