= First House of Orange =

Orange-Nice
- Country: Kingdom of Arles; Holy Roman Empire
- Current region: Occitans
- Founded: 885
- Founder: Pons de Mevouillon
- Final ruler: Tiburge of Orange
- Titles: Count of Orange; Lord of Nice, Courthézon, Vence and Gréolières
- Deposition: v. 1150

The first house of Orange is a Burgundian royal house that appears in the second half of the first century, and seems to have originated from the Viscounts of Nice. They ruled the County of Orange located in southern France from 885-1150. The house was succeeded by the House of Baux due to a lack of male heirs.

== History ==
In the tenth century, Guillaume the Liberator after defeating the Moors at the battle of Tourtour, distributed the reconquered lands terra nullius to his fellow soldiers and vassals. The Nice region returns to Annon then by to descendants who take the title of Viscount of Nice.

The county of Orange was acquired gradually around 1070 by Bertrand-Raimbaud d'Orange through his two marriages.

In Gréolières Rostaing, baron of Gréolières-Vence, built the castle of Gréolières, which is mentioned as early as 1079. This castle replaced the Bau de Saint Jean, called Marjone, facing the hamlet of Saint-Pons, built in 1047.

Weakened over the generations by the rule of indivision of the possessions, the eviction of the family of Nice is done successively in 1108 and 1117 to the benefit of the Bishopric of Nice. In 1108, the descendants of Raimbaud de Nice authorized the canons of Nice to acquire by gift or purchase the "honores" of their men. Nine years later, Jausserand-Laugier of the Gréolières branch sold half of his possessions in Nice to Bishop Pierre and the canons, the other half being left after his death. The municipality of Nice thus became at this date an independent maritime republic, which would be endowed around 1144 with a consulate.

In 1152, Laugier de Gréolières paid homage to the bishop of Nice. Thus in a little less than half a century, the bishops Pierre and Arnaud thus succeeded in eliminating from eastern Provence the descendants of Odile or, at least, in subjecting them to their authority. In 1155 Prince William of Baux, son of Tibors de Sarenom heiress of the First House of Orange and Bertrand I of Baux succeeded as Count of Orange, and was promoted to Prince of Orange in 1163 by Frederick Barbarossa, leading to the establishment of the House of Baux-Orange as Princes of Orange. Around 1230, Count Raimond Bérenger IV of Provence undertook the control of the upper Loup valley and to chew up the local nobility. The domains of Vence and Gréolières are conquered by Romée de Villeneuve around 1229, and in 1235 Raimond Bérenger IV consecrates him first baron of Vence. The fief remained in the family of Villeneuve, barons of Vence, until the Revolution

== Genealogy ==
=== Nice branch ===
Pons de Mevouillon x Blismodis
Pons II de Mevouillon x Richilde	Annon sgr de Vence x Bonafilia
Pierre de Mirabel bishop of Vaison	Féraud de Nice bishop of Gap	Pons III of Mevouillon	Laugier de Nice v. 950-1032	Odile de Provence dame de Nice	Branch of Vence
Accelena d'Apt	Raimbaud cosgr de Nice et Vence; 1006- 1073	Adelaide de Reillanne	Pierre de Nice bishop of Sisteron	Jauccana x Amic de Vence	Gerberge x Berenger vicount of Avignon	Rostaing sgr de Gréolières; 1032- 1067
Peter II of Nice; Bishop of Sisteron; 1035- 1103	Gisla x Rostaing sgr d'Agoult	Laugier-Rufus sgr of Nice; 1041- 1075 x Amance de Castellane	Rostaing-Raimbaud x Acelène de Fréjus	Bertrand- Raimbaud sgr of Orange x Adelaide of Canavese	Branche de Vence	Laugier-Rostaing x Ermengarde
Bertrand	Raimbaud II potestas of Nice	Francon potestas of Nice	Raimbaud II sgr. of Orange † 1121 x Rixende of Apt	Laugier bishop of Avignon	Jausserand- Laugier (or Gaucerand) sgr of Gréolières
Laugier III	Poncie x Guillaume Talon	Giraud Adhémar de Monteil	Tiburge dame d'Orange	Guillaume sgr d'Aumelas	Laugier sgr de Gréolières
Maison de Châteauneuf (sgr de Tourrette)	House of Adhemar	Raimbaud; 1140- 1173 sgr of Orange	Tiburge II dame of Orange x Bertrand sgr of Baux	Tiburgette x Adhémar de Murviel
Lords of Baux princes of Orange

=== Branch of Vence ===
Annon sgr de Vence x Bonafilia
Branch of Nice	Amic I x Belletrude	Laugarde	Lambert II sgr of Cucuron x Adeltrude	Adeltrude
Lambert sgr de Vence x Austrude de Marseille	Odile x Foulques vic de Marseille	Amic II x Jauccana de Nice	Guillaume sgr de Cucuron x Profecte	Gélin	Laufroi	Enguerrand
Foulques; 1030-1042	Guillaume x Aimerude	Hugues x Aimerude	Guillaume; 1042- 1055	Pierre Guillaume; 1028-1055	Bertrand Hugues; 1041-1055	Geoffroi

=== Sources ===
- Généalogie des familles nobles de Nice-Orange premiere maison d'Orange
- Généalogie des familles nobles Nice-Vence Seigneurs de Vence
- Généalogie des familles nobles de Nice-Orange Les Gréolières, seigneurs de Vaison
