= House of Baux =

French noble family

Coat of arms of the House of Baux, with the star signifying their legendary descent from King Balthazar, one of the Three Wise Men.

The House of Baux is a noble family from the south of France. It was one of the richest and most powerful families of medieval Provence, known as the 'Race d’Aiglon'. They were independent lords as castellans of Les Baux and Arles and wielded very considerable authority at the local level. They held important fiefs and vast lands, including the principality of Orange.

In Old French: baux (and in Provençal-Occitan, li baou) is the word for 'cliffs, escarpment'. In its use as the family name, it refers to the natural fortress on which the family built their castle, the Château des Baux and the village that surrounded it. The escarpment provided a raised and protected mountain valley that protected their food supply; the natural ridge of the Alpilles allowed control of all the approaches to the citadel of Les Baux-de-Provence and the surrounding countryside, including the passage up and down the Rhone, and the approaches from the Mediterranean. Together, these natural advantages made the fortress impervious to the military technology of the time.

The family of des Baux is still thriving today in Naples in the person of several noble families descended from younger sons who followed Charles of Anjou south. In particular from Bertrand, Lord of Baux and Prince of Orange, derive three cadet branches of the house, which moved to southern Italy, giving rise to the Italianized branches of the "Orsini del Balzo" Counts of Avellino, Dukes of Andria and Princes of Taranto.

After the death of Alix des Baux, the last sovereign of Baux, the chateau and town were seized by King Rene, who gave them to his second wife, Queen Jeanne of Laval. When Provence was united with the crown almost 150 years of royal governors followed, including the lords, later counts and princes, de Manville. Les Baux became a centre for Protestantism. Its unsuccessful revolt against the crown led Cardinal Richelieu in 1632 to order that the castle and its walls should be demolished. This was accomplished with the aid of artillery.

== Lords of Baux ==
Original coat of arms of the House of Baux (Lords of Baux). Some authors, and local tradition, with a hagiographic aim, fancifully claimed that the family was descended from Balthazar, one of the three Magi (the 16-rayed star symbolizing the star of Bethlehem). Some, that they descended from the first kings of Armenia, the star signifying that they directly knew Jesus. The mottoes of the family were Au Hasard Baltasar; Jamais Vassal; and Latin: Semper Ardentius.

The earliest definite ancestor was Pons (Poncius Iuvenis, 'Pons the Younger'). The name may indicate a trader from Greece, while his sobriquet, 'the Younger', distinguished him from his father, Pons the Elder. Pons the Younger was mentioned in three legal acts:

- 1st in the act of donation of 14 May 971 donating Montmajour to Boson & his wife Folcoare,
- 2nd in 975 in the act of donation of land to St Etienne d'Arles, now called St. Trophime (Arch. du chap. d'Arles, liv. autent. f. 22)
- 3rd with his wife Profecte in an act of donation in 981

The family descent then is:

- Pons the Younger (born c. 950, fl. 971-1028), father of
- Hugh I (born c. 970 – after 1059), father of
- William Hugh of Baux French: Guillaume Hugues or "Guilhem Uc" (after 1030 – 1105), father of
- Raymond I (before 1095 – 1150), father of
- Hugh II (reigned 1150 – 1167; retired to Sardinia where he died in 1179)
- Betrand I (1167–1181), brother of Hugh II
- Hugh III (1181–1240), lord of Baux, viscount of Marseille, eldest son of Bertrand I
- Barral of Baux (Barral I, 1240–1268), father of
- Bertrand III (1268–1305), father of
- Raymond II (1305–1322), father of
- Hugh IV (1322–1351), father of
- Robert (1351–1353)
- Raymond III (1353–1372), brother of Robert, father of
- John I (1372–1375)
- Alice I (1372–1426), sister of John

This branch of the House of Baux was declared extinct in 1426. The domains were inherited by Counts of Provence.

== Lords of Berre, Meyragues, Puyricard and Marignane ==
- Bertrand II des Baux, second oldest son of Bertrand I des Baux, lord of Berre, Meyragues and Puyricard, and Marignane (1181–1201)
- ...

From this branch originated the family branches of the Seigneurs de Berre, Lords of Meyrargues and Puyricard, who became extinct in 1349, and lords of Marignane, acquired by House of Valois-Anjou, as well as the Dukes of Andria.

== Princes of Orange ==
When a branch of the lords of Baux married the heiress of the princes of Orange, they quartered their arms with those of the princes of Orange.

- Bertrand I des Baux (1171–1181)
- Raymond II of Baux, (1218–1282)
- William I, youngest son of Bertrand I des Baux, (1181–1218)
- William II, co-Prince (with brothers),1218-1239
- Bertrand II, (1281–1314)
- Raymond III (1314–1340)
- Raymond V (1340–1393)
- Mary of Baux-Orange (1393–1417), daughter, married John III of Chalon-Arlay

In 1417, the House of Ivrea or House of Chalon-Arlay succeeded as princes of Orange.

A brother of William I started the branch of the Lords of Courbezon (House of Baux-Courbezon), which became extinct in 1393. Another brother started the line of Lords of Suze, Solerieux and Barri (House of Baux-Suze-Solerieux-Barri), which became extinct and reverted afterwards to the counts of Orange.

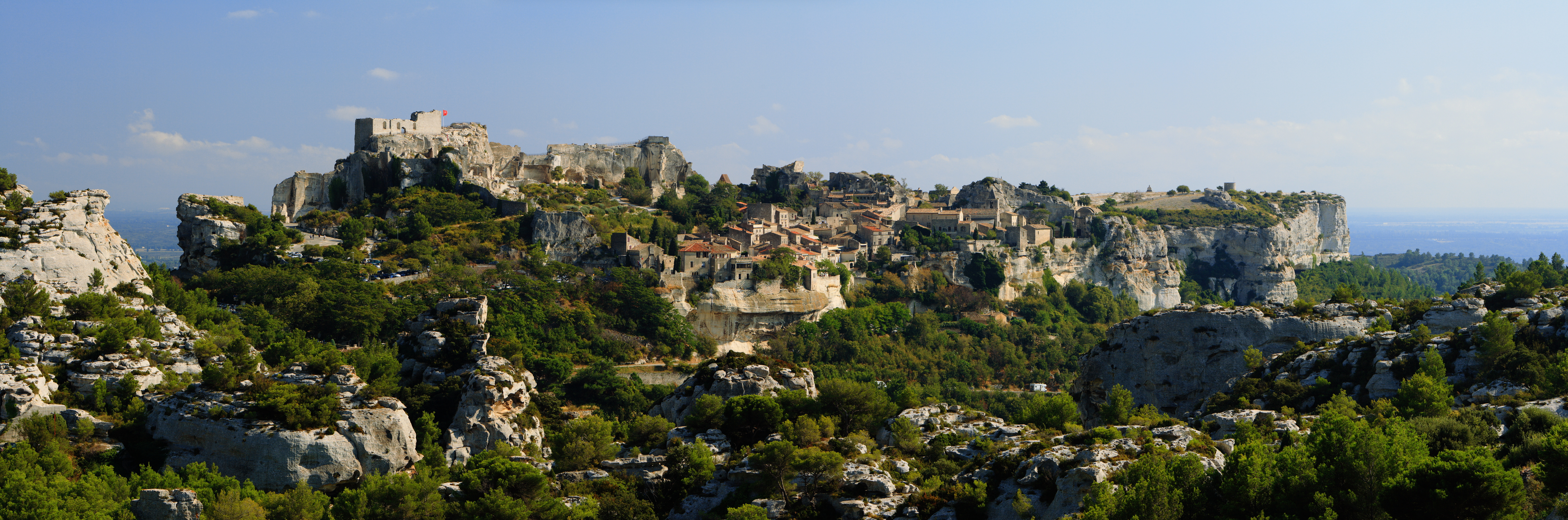
Les Baux-de-Provence seen from the side, showing the natural fortress created by the escarpment. Without gunpowder, it was impregnable.

== Family Genealogy ==
=== Ancestors of the Lords of Baux ===
The ancestors of the Lords of Baux:

Ancestors of the Lords of Baux
- Leibulf de Provence (vers 750–835)
  - m. Odda ?
    - Leibulf des Baux (middle of the 9th century).
      - m. ??
        - Pons d’Arles (end of the 9th century)
          - m. Blismodis de Mâcon
            - Humbert, Bishop of Vaison-la-Romaine (890–933)
            - Ison d’Arles (890–942)
              - m. Princess ? of Benevento
                - Lambert Ursus seigneurs de Reillanne
                  - m. Galburge de Bénévent
                    - Seigneurs de Reillanne
                - Pons de Marseille (910–979),
                  - m. Judith de Bretagne, (Note: Line of the dukes d'Andria and Nardo, counts of Squillace, princes of Tarento (in Naples) and Achaïa (Greece). Elder branch ended in 1530 in the male line. A younger branch survives in Naples as the "del Balzo" in multiple branches, as dukes of Capriglianode, another as counts del Balzo (died out 1932) and another as the dukes of Presenzano.del Balzo di Presenzano, Gioacchino. "GENEALOGY Maison del Balzo/des Baux, with bibliography cited there".) daughter d'Alain II de Bretagne
                    - Honoratus de Marseille (930–978), Bishop of Marseille
                    - William of Marseille (935–1004)
                    - m. Bellilde, daughter d’Arlulf de Marseille
                      - Vicomtes de Marseille
                  - m. Belletrude (Note: Sg Courthézon, gave his rights to the principality to Raymond IV for this lordship. One male line died out c.1372, the other two lead to the counts d'Alessano, and counts d'Alessano, including the Orsini des Baux, died out by 1550.del Balzo di Presenzano, Gioacchino. "GENEALOGY Maison del Balzo/des Baux, with bibliography cited there".)
                    - (hyp) Pons de Fos (vers 945–1025)
                      - m. Profecta de Marignane
                        - Seigneurs de Fos
                        - (hyp) Hugues des Baux (981–1060)
                          - m. Inauris de Cavaillon (?)
                            - Guillaume Hugues de Baux (1060–1095)
                              - m. Vierne
                                - Raymond-Raimbaud des Baux (1095–1150)
                                  - m. Étiennette de Gévaudan
                                    - Bertrand des Baux
                                      - m. Thiburge II d'Orange

=== Simplified Family Tree of the Lords of Baux ===
The family tree of the lords of Baux: (Note: (Per the references cited in the Simplified family tree footnote section below, rather than footnote each person, as they are from all these sources))

Pons the Younger "Iuventus"; 945-1025
Hugh; 981-1060; Lord of Baux | Geoffrey I of Provence, 1013-1062, Count of Provence
William Hugo c. 1026 - c. 1105; Lord of Baux | William Bertrand; 1051-1094; Count of Provence | Gerberga; 1094-1118; Countess of Provence | Gilbert; Viscount of Gévaudan; Count of Arles d.ca. 1110
Raymond I 1095-1150; Lord of Baux | Stephanie d. c. 1160; The younger daughter. This marriage was the start of the Baussenque Wars over the succession to Provence | Dulcia; Countess of Provence c. 1090–1127 | Ramon Berenguer III "the Great"; Count of Barcelona c. 1082–1131
Hugh II; 1150-1170 Iudicarus of Arborea; Sardinia; Vcte. des Baux to 1384 | Bertrand I Lord of Baux; 1130-1181; Count & from 1163; Prince of Orange | Tiburge d'Orange died 1189 daughter & heiress of Raimbaud II d'Orange; Count of Orange | Counts of Provence
Barrale; Viscountess of Marseille died 1234 | Hugh III; 1173- 1240; Lord of Baux; Vcte of Marseille | Bertrand II died 1201 co-Prince of Orange | William I ?-1218; Prince of Orange
Barral I 1217-1270; Lord of Baux; Vcte of Marseille | Raymond II d.1236 Vcte of Marseille | Bertrand III; Count of Andria, Montescaglioso, and Squillace | Raymond I 1202-1282 co-Prince of Orange | William II; 1218-1239 co-Prince of Orange
Bertrand II; 1244-1305; Lord of Baux; Vcte of Marseille; 1st Count d'Avellino (Naples) 1278 | Bertrand III; Sg Meyrargues et Puyricard +1266; Line of Sg de Meyrargues et de Puyricard ended 1352 in the male line. | Gilbert; Sg de Marignane; Line of sg de Marignane line continues to present in Provence | William I Sg de Berre +1265/1266 dukes d'Andria(Naples) from whom "del Balzo" dukes of Capriglianode dukes of Presenzano | Raymond; Vcte of Berre; No descendants | Francis I Duke of Andria, Count of Montescaglioso & Squillace | Bertrand IV died 1314; 4th-Prince of Orange | Eléonore de Genève | William IV d. 1281 co-Prince of Orange | William III died 1256/7 co-Prince of Orange; Sg Courthézon | Raymond II died 1256/7 co-Prince of Orange sg Courthézon et Suze, Séguret; Sérignan, Camaret
Raymond I 1268-1321; Lord of Baux; Vcte of Marseille; Count d'Avellino (Naples); Sénéchal de Provence 1315; Régent de Naples in 1295 | Hugh assassinated Milan 1302; Sg de Loriol; Sénéchal of Piémont; Vicaire Général Lombardy no descendants | Barral II; 1301-1331; Sg de Loreto | Agoult d.1346/7 Sg. de Caromb, Brantes; Le Barroux, St Léger; Sénéchal Beaucaire and Nimes 1340; Toulouse/Albi 1342; Cap. gén. en Languedoc | James; Prince of Taranta & Achaia titular Latin emperor of Constantinople | William II; Duke of Andria | Raymond IV died 1340; 5th Prince of Orange | Bertrand III died 1305 co-Prince of Orange; Sg Courthézon | Raymond III (Note: Gave his rights to his brother. Male line died out c. 1409. del Balzo di Presenzano, Gioacchino. "GENEALOGY Maison del Balzo/des Baux". del Balzo di Presenzano, Gioacchino. "GENEALOGY Maison del Balzo/des Baux, with bibliography cited there".) d.ca.1339 co-Prince of Orange; 2nd sg de Suze, & Bari
Hugh II; 1311-1351; Lord of Baux; Vcte of Marseille; Count d'Avellino (Naples); Sénéchal de Provence 1343; Grand Admiral of Naples | Bertrand d. 1355; Seig of Caromb | Dragobert; 1327/8-1340 sg de Villefranche | Raymond; 1328-1381; Sg of Caromb | Amiel d. 1375; Sg of Caromb | Francis II; Duke of Andria | Raymond V died 1393; 6th Prince of Orange | Jeanne de Genève | Bertrand d.1380 Sg. of Gigondas; Suze, Condorcet | Guiges d.1390 | Guillaume d.1390 Sg of Camaret; Travaillan, Condorcet
Antoine d. 1374; Sg of Aubagne | Robert d.1354 Lord of Baux; Vcte of Marseille; Count d'Avellino | Raymond II; 1331-1372; Lord of Baux; Vcte of Marseille; Count d'Avellino | Francis d. 1390; Sg of Aubagne | Pirro; Duke of Andria, Prince of Altamura | Mary died 1417; 7th Princess of Orange | John III of Chalon lord of Arlay died 1418 | William d. 1427; Sg. of St-Roman de Malegarde
John; 1372-1375 posthumous child | Alix (Note: She was married to Odon de Villars and Conrad IV de Furstemberg. Her uncle, on her mother's side, Raymond de Turenne used the fortress of Baux to wage war on the counts of Provence. On her death, the lordship of Baux was seized by King Rene, the count of Provence and given to his wife, Jeanne of Laval, thus ending its independence.fr:Alix des Baux) 1367-1426 last sovereign of the indep. state of Baux; Countess d'Avellino | Frederick king of Naples | Isabella del Balzo | Chalon & Nassau; Princes of Orange

== See also ==
- Les Baux de Provence
- Les Baux de Provence AOC
- Baussenque Wars (1144–1162)

== Bibliography ==
- Grew, Marion Ethel (1947). The House of Orange. London: Methuen & Co. Ltd.

=== Sources for the Vicomtes de Marseille ===
- Édouard Baratier, Ernest Hildesheimer et Georges Duby, Atlas historique...
- and the table of Henry de Gérin-Ricard, Actes concernant les vicomtes de Marseille et leurs descendants...

=== Sources: Ancestors of the Lords of Baux section ===
==== Genealogy works ====
- Georges de Manteyer, La Provence du premier au douzième siècle, études d'histoire et de géographie... (1908),
- Juigné de Lassigny, Généalogie des vicomtes de Marseille...,
- Fernand Cortez, Les grands officiers royaux de Provence au moyen-âge listes chronologiques...,
- Papon, de Louis Moréri, du marquis de Forbin, Monographie de la terre et du château de Saint-Marcel, près Marseille: du Xe au XIXe siècle... ("Monograph of the land and the castle of Saint-Marcel, near Marseille, from the tenth to the nineteenth century ..."), Marseille, 1888
- J. Berge, Origines rectifiées des maisons féodales Comtes de Provence, Princes d'Orange ..., France-Riviera, 1952
- Poly, Jean-Pierre, La Provence et la société féodale (879–1166), Paris: Bordas, 1976,
- Jacques Saillot, Le Sang de Charlemagne...

=== Sources: Simplified family tree section ===
- Grew 1947
- Rowen, Herbert H. (1988). The princes of Orange: the stadholders in the Dutch Republic. Cambridge University Press.
- de Pontbriant, A. (1891). Histoire de la principaute d'Orange: suivre de lettres inedites des princes d'Orange, des rois de France, du Cte de Grignan, etc. Avignon: Seguin freres.
- Schwennicke, Detlev (1989). Europäiche Stammtafeln, Stammtafeln der Europäichen Staaten, Neue Folge, Volume III, Part 4, Das feudale Frankreich und sein Einfluß auf die Welt des Mittelalters. Marburg: Verlag J.A. Stargardt. pp. 745, 748, 751, & 752.

==== Genealogy works ====
- Gioacchino del Balzo di Presenzano, http://www.delbalzo.net/genealogia2.htm GENEALOGY Maison del Balzo/des Baux extensive bibliography
- G.Noblemaire, Histoire de la Maison des Baux, Parigi: 1912 and 1975
- J.Dunbabin, Charles I of Anjou, London/New York: 1998
- E.Leonard,Les Angevins de Naples, Paris: 1954
- Almanach of Gotha, 1888-1943
- F. Mazel, La Noblesse et l’Eglise en ProvenceFin X – debut XIV siecle, L’Exemple des familles d’Agoult-Simiane, des Baux et de Marseilles, CTHS – Paris: 2002
- H.Aliquot et R.Merceron,Armorial d’Avignon et Du Comtat Venaissin, Avignon:1987
- Cambridge Medieval History, Volumes I – IX, Cambridge: 1911
- Cambridge Medieval History, Vol II, III, IV, Revised Edition 1996 -2003
- Cambridge Modern History, Volumes I-XII, Cambridge: 1962-63
