= Balzo =

Balzo may refer to:

== Clothing ==
- Balzo headdress

== Notable people with the surname ==
- House of Baux
- Antonia of Balzo (1355–1374), the second Queen consort of Frederick III the Simple
- Giovanni Antonio del Balzo Orsini (1386–1463), Prince of Taranto, Duke of Bari, etc.
- Isabella del Balzo (died 1533), the second wife and only Queen consort of Frederick IV of Naples
- Liana Del Balzo (1899–1982), Italian film actress
- Raimondo del Balzo Orsini (died 1406), remarkable nobleman of the Kingdom of Naples
- Mary of Baux-Orange
