= Francesco Del Balzo =

Francesco Del Balzo may refer to:

- Francesco del Balzo, 1st Duke of Andria, Duke of Andria, Count of Montescaglioso and Squillace, and Lord of Berre, Mison, and Tiano
- Francesco II del Balzo, southern Italian nobleman
