= House of Orange (disambiguation) =

The House of Orange is a branch of the House of Nassau active in European politics.

House of Orange may also refer to:

- "The House of Orange" (song), a song by Stan Rogers from the 1984 album: From Fresh Water
- First House of Orange, a medieval royal house originally controlling the County of Orange
- House of Baux, sometimes called the Second House of Orange
- House of Orange-Chalon, a medieval Frankish dynasty of Burgundy, sometimes called the Third House of Orange
- House of Orange-Nassau, a branch of the European House of Nassau, sometimes called the Fourth House of Orange

== See also ==
- Order of the House of Orange
- Principality of Orange
- Prince of Orange, a title originally associated with the Principality of Orange
