= Tiburge, Countess of Orange =

Tiburge of Orange (died 1150), was a suo jure ruling countess regnant of Orange from 1115 to 1150.

She was born to Raimbaut II, Count of Orange, and married William of Aumelas, who became her co-ruler jure uxoris.

William and Tiburge had three children:

- Raimbaut of Orange (or Raimbaut d'Aurenja) who became lord of Orange and Aumelas and was a major troubadour. He died childless.
- Tiburge, who in 1147 married Adhemar (Adémar) de Murvieux, from Murviel near Montpellier. They had two daughters, Tiburge and Sibylle, who (after the death of their uncle Raimbaut) became joint possessors of Aumelas, eventually ceding it in 1199 to William VIII of Montpellier.
- Tiburge (autre Tiburge, according to her father's will), who married
  - Firstly Geoffrey of Mornas, and
  - Secondly, after March 1155, Bertrand I des Baux (died 1181 or 1182; son of Raymond des Baux and Stephanie of Gévaudan). Tiburge and Bertrand had three sons and two daughters. Their second son, Hugh des Baux, married Barrale of Marseille (daughter of Raymond Geoffrey of Marseille) and was the father of Barral des Baux. Their youngest son, William I of Baux, was the first prince of Orange.
