= Raimbaut II of Orange =

Rambaud II d'Orange
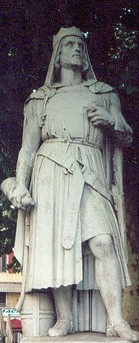

Personal details
- Born: Possibly 1066 Orange, Vaucluse
- Died: 1121 Palestine

Raimbaut II, Count of Orange (Circa. 1066 - 1121) (in Latin Raimboldus comes de Oringis) was the elder son of Bertrand Raimbaut and of his first wife Gilberte.

== Biography ==
Raimbaut's date of birth is not known (possibly around 1066 in Orange). At this time this was part of the Kingdom of Arles in the Holy Roman Empire. According to two sources, Albert of Aix and William of Tyre (neither of them eyewitnesses), he joined the First Crusade in the army of Raymond of Saint-Gilles, presumably setting out in 1096; his name is linked with those of Adhemar of Le Puy and Robert II of Flanders, and he is said to have been present at the siege of Antioch in 1098. He remained in Palestine and died there, probably in 1121.

He married a certain Rixende of Apt. No sons survived him. But his daughter, Tiburge, Countess of Orange, in her father's prolonged absence, was being named "countess of Orange" as early as 1115. She married William of Aumelas, second son of William VI of Montpellier; she was still alive in 1136. Their son (Raimbaut's only grandson) was the troubadour Raimbaut of Orange, and he inherited the territories of Aumelas and Orange.

A statue of Raimbaut, count of Orange, was erected in the main square at Orange in 1846.
