= William III of Baux =

William III of Baux (died 1257) was a son of William II of Baux and grandson of William I of Baux. Following his father and grandfather, William III carried the title of prince of Orange. The title had come to the House of Baux through a brother, Raimbaut of Orange, of William III's paternal great-grandmother, Tiburge de Sarenom, the latter also referred to as Tiburge princess of Orange.
