= William of Holland =

William of Holland may refer to:

- William I, Count of Holland (1167 – 1222), Count of Holland from 1203 to 1222
- William II, Count of Holland (1228 - 1256), count of Holland and Zeeland, elected German anti-king in 1247
- William III, Count of Holland (1286 – 1337), Count William III of Avesnes and of Holland and Count William II of Zeeland
- William IV, Count of Holland (1307 – 1345) was William IV of Avesnes, William IV of Holland and William III of Zeeland
- William V, Count of Holland, (1330 – 1389), known as William V, Count of Holland, William III, Count of Hainault, William I, Duke of Bavaria-Straubing and William IV, Count of Zeeland
- William VI, Count of Holland, (ruled 1404 - 1417), also known as William II of Bavaria-Straubing, count William IV of Hainaut and count William V of Zeeland

The several William of Oranges may also have sometimes been known as William of Holland.
