= Claude I de Manville =

French nobleman

Claude I de Manville was a French nobleman.

He was the nephew of Claude I de Manville from a Toulouse family, Captain of the royal galleys, a Knight of the Holy Sepulchre, then named Provost Captain of Les Baux.

The Hôtel de Manville was built in 1571 by Flayelle, an architect from Vivarais, on behalf of his son Count Claude II de Manville. This property was later donated by Prince Bianchi de Medici de Manville to the municipality to accommodate the town hall.

== See also ==
- Les Baux-de-Provence
