= Maniac (1963 film) =

1963 film by Michael Carreras

The Maniac
- Theatrical release poster
- Directed by: Michael Carreras
- Written by: Jimmy Sangster
- Produced by: Jimmy Sangster
- Starring: Kerwin Mathews; Nadia Gray; Liliane Brousse; Donald Houston
- Cinematography: Wilkie Cooper
- Edited by: Tom Simpson
- Music by: Stanley Black
- Production company: Hammer Film Productions
- Distributed by: BLC Release (UK); Columbia Pictures (U.S.)
- Release dates: 20 May 1963; (U.K.); 30 October 1963 (U.S.)
- Running time: 87 minutes
- Country: United Kingdom
- Language: English

Maniac (also known as The Maniac) is a 1963 British psychological thriller film directed by Michael Carreras and starring Kerwin Mathews, Nadia Gray and Donald Houston.

== Plot ==
The story tells of vacationing American artist Jeff Farrell who becomes romantically involved with an older woman named Eve Beynat in southern France while at the same time harboring an attraction to her teenage stepdaughter, Annette. Eve's husband/Annette's father Georges is in an asylum for, four years ago, using a blowtorch to kill a man who had raped Annette. Believing it will help make Eve his for life, Jeff agrees to assist her in springing Georges from the asylum. However, Eve has a completely different agenda. Inspector Etienne sets up a plot to help trap the killer, and the climactic scenes are set at Les Baux-de-Provence in the huge stone galleries dug into the rock of the Val d'Enfer on the road to Maillane.

== Cast ==
- Kerwin Mathews as Jeff Farrell
- Nadia Gray as Eve Beynat
- Donald Houston as Henri
- Liliane Brousse as Annette Beynat
- George Pastell as Inspector Etienne
- Arnold Diamond as Janiello
- Norman Bird as Salon
- Justine Lord as Grace
- Jerold Wells as Giles
- Leon Peers as Blanchard
- André Maranne as Salon

== Production ==
The film was shot in black-and-white in the Camargue district of southern France and the MGM British Studios in Borehamwood, Hertfordshire. Some filming occurred at Bray Studios in Berkshire.

== Release ==
Maniac was released by Hammer Film Productions on 20 May 1963 in the United Kingdom. Released on Blu-ray by Mill Creek in 2018.

== Critical reception ==
Andy Black wrote: "Maniac was written and produced by Jimmy Sangster, with Michael Carreras handling direction, and what an under-rated director he was. Donald Houston is George, an escapee from a French asylum (obviously Les Diaboliques had a big effect on Sangster, who also set Taste of Fear in France) who wants to kill his wife's lover. The wife is Nadia Gray, and the lover is Kerwin Matthews. Houston underplays, and also has a fetish for oxy-acetylene torches, with which he causes much panic. A brief 86 minutes and full of little twists and 'who's-behind-the-door' shocks, it really works first time you see it, but is not a film to watch repeatedly."

Turner Classic Movies wrote "Maniac has excellent production values but labors under the weight of yet another gimmicky and obvious script by Jimmy Sangster...The acting is fine, especially that of Kerwin Mathews and Liliane Brousse."; and in The New York Times, Bosley Crowther wrote "Maniac has one thing and has it in spades—a plot of extraordinary cunning...(It) takes on a twitching suspense that simmers, sizzles and explodes in a neat backflip", though he concluded "Michael Carrera's direction is uneven and the characters are a generally flabby lot...Maniac remains a striking blueprint, with satanic tentacles, for a much better picture."
