= William of Orange =

William of Orange usually refers to either:

- William the Silent, William I, (1533–1584), Prince of Orange, leader of the Dutch Revolt, founder of the House Orange-Nassau and the United Provinces as a state
- William III of England, William III of Orange-Nassau, William II of Scotland, (1650–1702) stadtholder of the Dutch Republic

William of Orange may also refer to:

== Middle Ages ==
- Saint William of Gellone (755 – c. 812), courtier of Charlemagne who defeated the Saracens at Orange
- William (Bishop of Orange) (d. 1098), a Bishop who joined the First Crusade

== William of Orange in the House of Baux and the House of Chalon-Arlay ==
- William I of Baux (c. 1155 – 1219)
- William II of Baux (died 1239)
- William III of Baux (died 1256)
- William VII of Chalon-Arlay (c. 1415 – 1478)

== United Provinces of the Netherlands ==
- William II, Prince of Orange (1626–1650), stadtholder of the United Provinces of the Netherlands from 1647
- William IV, Prince of Orange (1711–1751), first hereditary stadtholder of the Netherlands
- William V, Prince of Orange (1748–1806), last Stadtholder of the Dutch Republic and leader of the conservative faction

== Kingdom of the Netherlands ==
- William I of the Netherlands (1772–1843), also known as William Frederik of Orange-Nassau or William VI of Orange before his accession
- William II of the Netherlands (1792–1849), King of the Netherlands and Grand Duke of Luxembourg
- William III of the Netherlands (1817–1890), King of the Netherlands and Grand Duke of Luxembourg
- William, Prince of Orange (1840–1879), eldest son of William III, died before his father
- Willem-Alexander, King of the Netherlands (b. 1967), King of the Netherlands, eldest child of former Queen Beatrix

== Other ==
- William of Orange (pigeon), pigeon used by British military in Battle of Arnhem in September 1944

== See also ==
- Prince of Orange
