= William Orange =

William Orange may refer to:

- William Orange (clergyman) (1889–1966), New Zealand Anglican clergyman
- William Orange (physician) (1883-1916), English physician

== See also ==
- William of Orange (disambiguation)
