= William of Aumelas =

William of Aumelas (or Omelas) was the second son of William V of Montpellier and of Ermessende, daughter of count Peter of Melgueil. The lordship of Aumelas (the Aumeladez) was detached from the territories of Montpellier to create a property for him.

At some date after 1118 he married Tiburge, Countess of Orange, daughter and heiress of Raimbaut, count of Orange. He fell ill and made his will on 7 March 1155. He died before May 1156. William and Tiburge had three children:

- Raimbaut of Orange (or Raimbaut d'Aurenja) who became lord of Orange and Aumelas and was a major troubadour. He died childless.
- Tiburge, who in 1147 married Adhemar (Adémar) de Murvieux, from Murviel near Montpellier. They had two daughters, Tiburge and Sibylle, who (after the death of their uncle Raimbaut) became joint possessors of Aumelas, eventually ceding it in 1199 to William VIII of Montpellier.
- Tiburge (autre Tiburge, according to her father's will), who married
  - Firstly Geoffrey of Mornas, and
  - Secondly, after March 1155, Bertrand I des Baux (died 1181 or 1182; son of Raymond des Baux and Stephanie of Gévaudan). Tiburge and Bertrand had three sons and two daughters. Their second son, Hugh des Baux, married Barrale of Marseille (daughter of Raymond Geoffrey of Marseille) and was the father of Barral des Baux. Their youngest son, William I of Baux, was the first prince of Orange.
