= Antonia of Baux =

Queen consort of Sicily
- Tenure: 26 November 1373 – 23 January 1375
- Born: c. 1353
- Died: 23 January 1375; Messina or Reggio di Calabria
- Burial: Messina Cathedral
- Spouse: Frederick IV of Sicily
- House: Baux
- Father: Francis of Baux, Duke of Andria
- Mother: Margaret of Taranto

Antonia of Baux (Italian: Antonia del Balzo; c. 1353 – 23 January 1375), was an Italian noblewoman member of the French House of Baux (italianized as del Balzo) and by marriage Queen consort of Sicily, Duchess consort of Athens and Neopatras.

== Birth and family ==
The exact birthplace of Antonia of Baux is not known. She was born around 1353 and was the second child and first daughter of Francis of Baux, member of the House of Baux and 1st Duke of Andria, Count of Montescaglioso, Squillace, Avellino and Teano and his second wife, Margaret of Taranto, princess from the Capetian House of Anjou. Her paternal grandparents were Bertrand III of Baux, 1st Count of Andria and Marguerite d'Aunay, and her maternal grandparents were Philip I, Prince of Taranto and Catherine II of Valois, titular Latin Empress of Constantinople and Princess of Achaea.

== Queen of Sicily ==
On 26 November 1373, Antonia married Frederick IV, King of Sicily, Duke of Athens and Neopatras. The bride was approximately twenty years old and the groom thirty-one. The marriage sealed the peace between the Kingdoms of Naples and Sicily, priorly agreed, and was the result of the diplomatic efforts of Pope Gregory IX, who wanted to end the war between both Kingdoms, which began as early as 1313. He managed to convince King Frederick IV and Queen Joanna I of Naples of the need for a peace agreement, secured by a dynastic marriage between both countries. For this, the Pope even prevented the planned marriage between the King of Sicily and Antonia Visconti, daughter of the Lord of Milan; acting in the interests of the papacy, Pope Gregory IX supported the independence of the Kingdom of Sicily from the Kingdom of Aragon.

Negotiations between both parties were carried out simultaneously in Rome (where a peace agreement between the kingdoms was being prepared) and Naples (where marriage negotiations were underway). The Pope appointed the Archbishop of Naples as his representative for the last on 6 February 1372. On 1 October, was finally received the pontificial blessing for the marriage between King Frederick and Antonia. By this time, the peace agreement between the Kingdoms of Sicily and Naples had already been in their final stages. At the insistence of Queen Joanna I, clauses were introduced into it that guaranteed that the bride, after marriage, would kept all her rights, including the hereditary ones, and it was stipulated that the maintenance allocated to her by her husband should be the same as that received by all previous consorts of the Kings of Sicily.

The wedding ceremony took place in Messina. For King Frederick IV, this was his second marriage. His first wife, infanta Constance of Aragon, died in 1363 leaving him only one daughter, Maria, but no with needed male heirs.

None of the expectations that the King of Sicily had for his marriage to Antonia came true. First, the marriage turned out to be childless. Secondly, the attempts of King Frederick III, having solved foreign policy problems, to concentrate on solving domestic political problems —resolving the conflict with the rebellious vassals, turned out to be a failure. In addition, due to unacceptable demands from Pope Gregory IX, he and his second wife were never crowned. And, finally, Antonia's sudden death brought to naught diplomatic efforts to strengthen ties between Messina and Naples, as a result of which the King of Sicily resumed cooperation with Milan.

== Death and burial ==
In the winter of 1375, rebellious vassals led by Enrico II Rosso, Count of Aidone, did not allow the royal galley with King Frederick III and his wife on board to enter the port of Messina. The royal couple stopped at the port of Reggio di Calabria, where on 19 January of the same year, the same rebels attacked their ship, threatening them with death. Shocked by the assault, Queen Antonia threw herself into the sea. She managed to escape, but was struck by a severe fever and a few days later, on 23 January, died in either Reggio di Calabria or Messina. She was buried in Messina Cathedral.

== Bibliography ==
- Castelli di Torremuzza, Vincenzo (1820). Fasti di Sicilia (in Italian). Vol. I. Messina: Pappalardo.
- Chiusole, Antonio (1743). La genealogia delle case più illustri di tutto il mondo principiando da Adamo nostro primo padre, e continuando sino al tempo presente, rappresentata su 325 tavole colle sue dichiarazioni accanto per dar lume alla storia, cavata da' principali autori de' nostri tempi, data in luce da Antonio Chiusole (in Italian). Venice: Appresso Giambattista Recurti.
- Richardson, Douglas; Everingham, Kimball G. (2004). Plantagenet Ancestry: Plantagenet Ancestry: A Study In Colonial And Medieval Families. Genealogical Publishing Company. ISBN 978-0806317502.

Royal titles
| Preceded by Constance of Aragon | Queen consort of Sicily; 26 November 1373 – 23 January 1375 | Succeeded by Blanche I of Navarre |
