= Château des Baux =

Castle in France

Château des Baux-de-Provence
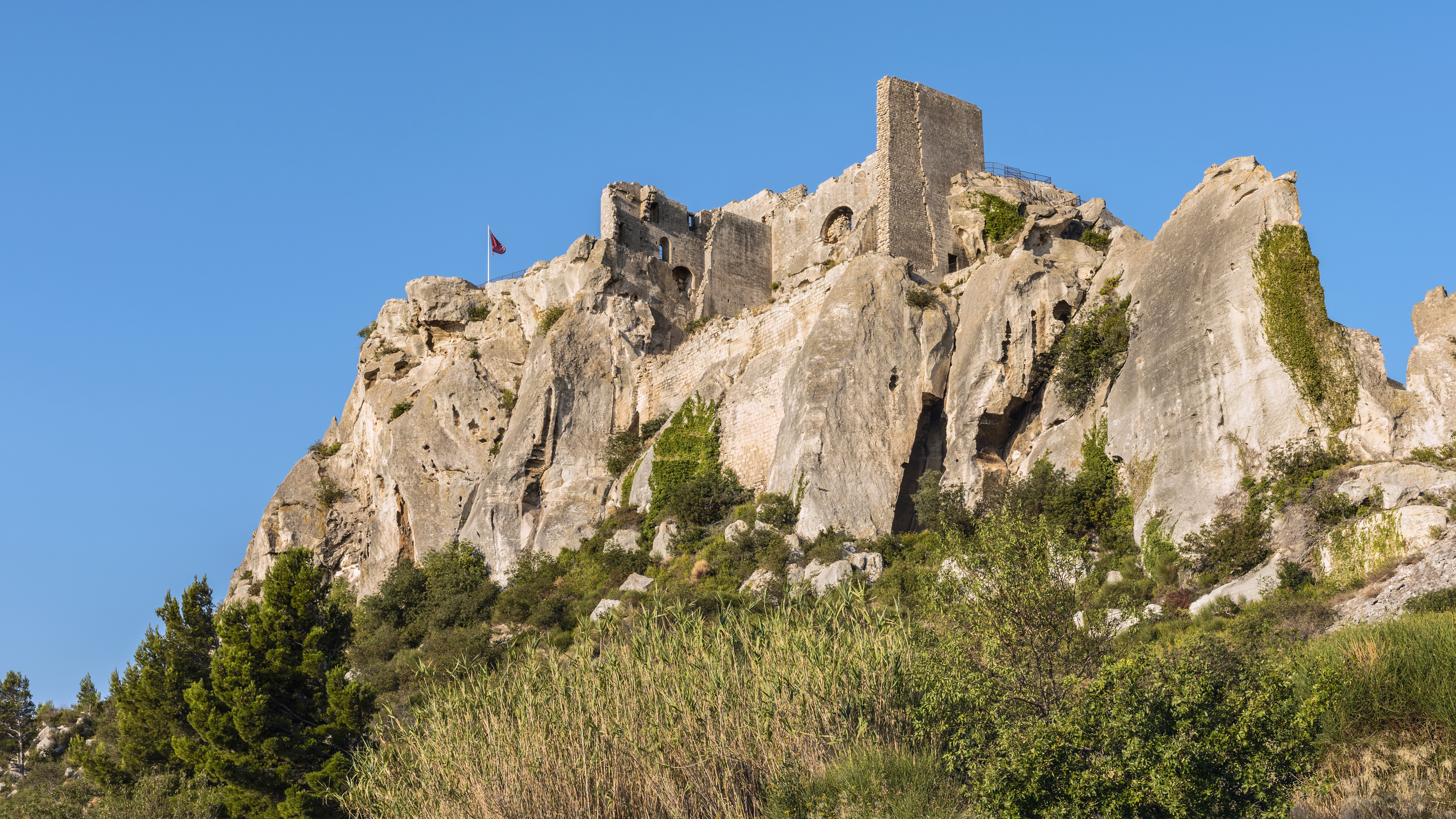
- The Château des Baux-de-Provence on the rocky outcrop
- Interactive map of the Château des Baux-de-Provence area

General information
- Type: Castle
- Architectural style: Medieval
- Location: Les Baux-de-Provence, Bouches-du-Rhône, Provence-Alpes-Côte d'Azur, France
- Coordinates: 43.744317°N 4.797061°E
- Construction started: 11th century
- Owner: Municipality

Design and construction
- Designations: Monument historique

The Château des Baux is a ruined fortified castle built during the 10th century, located in Les Baux-de-Provence, Bouches-du-Rhône, southern France.

== History ==
Although already inhabited in the Bronze Age, Les Baux-de-Provence did not really start growing until the medieval period. Built in the 10th century, the fortress and the small town it protects were ruled by the lords of Baux for five hundred years, in the thick of the ceaseless conflicts that ravaged Provence. It was also at Les Baux that the most famous minstrels and troubadours of the day sang songs of courtly love to the maidens of the House of Les Baux. In the 15th century, the lords of Baux were superseded by the barons of the Masons des Comtes de Provence. This was a golden age for the Château, before it came under the control of the kings of France.

From the 16th century on, family feuds and wars of religion brought on the decline of the town until the fortress was pulled down in 1633 on the orders of Louis XIII.

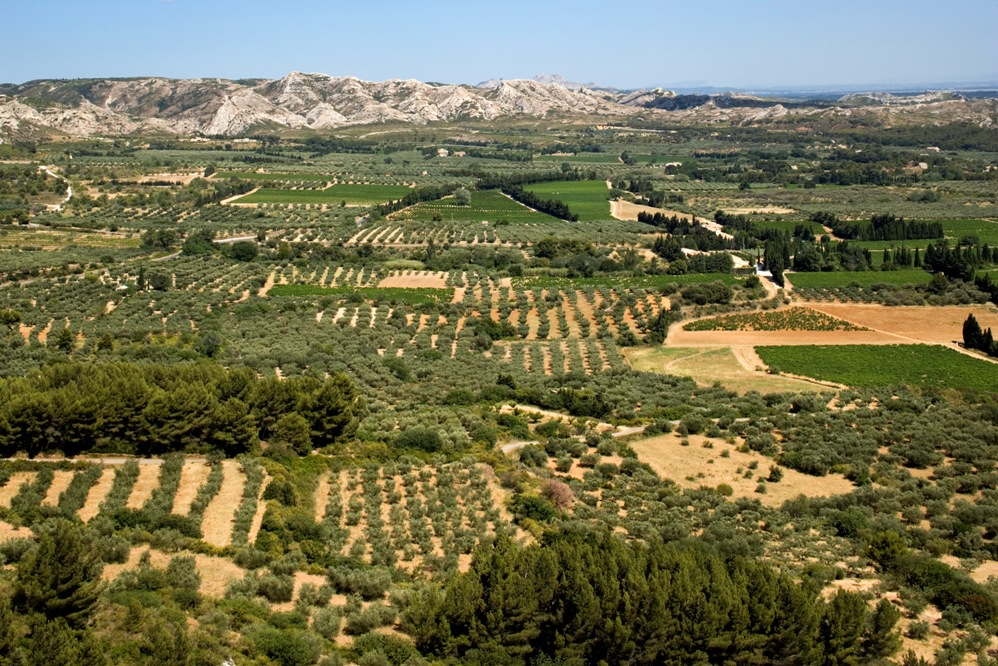
View from the castle

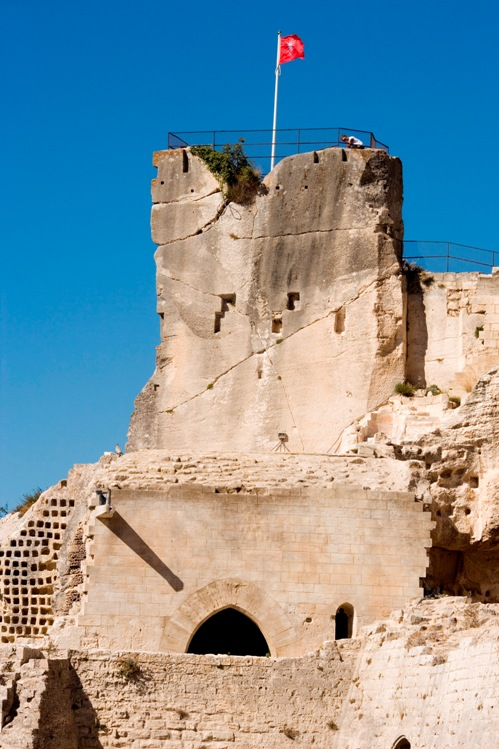
The keep

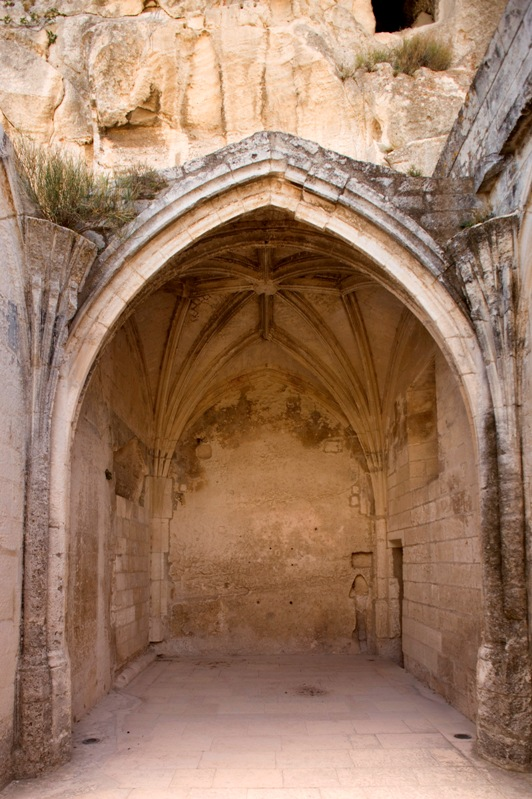
Chapel within the castle

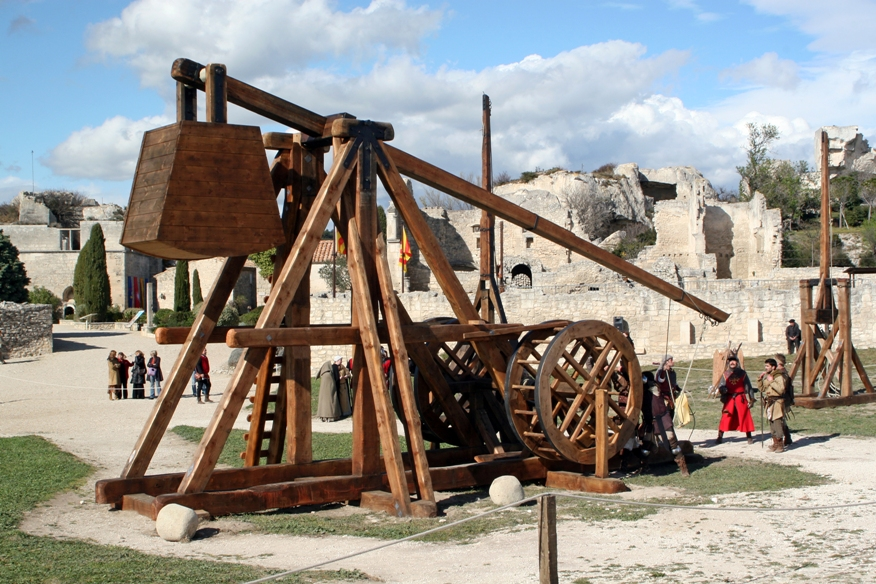
Trébuchet

== The Château des Baux today ==
Visitors to the Château des Baux can see full-scale replicas of huge siege engines, including a couillard, bricole, ballista, and the biggest trebuchet in Europe, which is launched during demonstrations several times daily between April and September.
