= Profile Portrait of a Lady =

15th-century portrait by an unknown artist

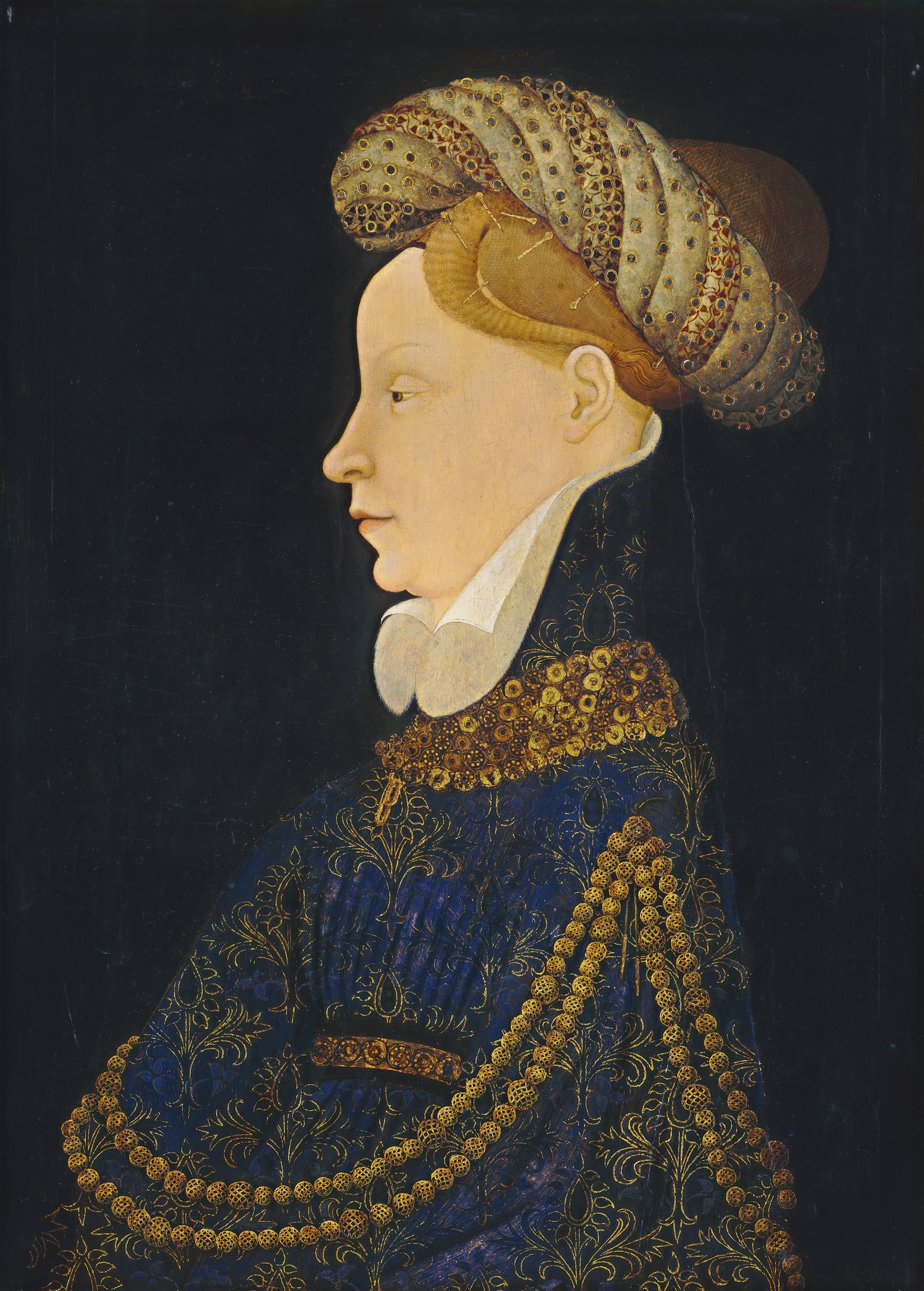
- Year: c. 1410
- Dimensions: 52 cm (20 in) × 36.6 cm (14.4 in)
- Location: National Gallery of Art
- Collection: Andrew W. Mellon collection
- Identifiers: RKDimages ID: 219099

Profile Portrait of a Lady is oil on panel painting by an unknown Franco-Flemish artist, dated to about 1410. It is housed in the National Gallery of Art, Washington. (Note: Hand & Wolff note that Charles Sterling lists the surviving independent portraits from this period, in addition to Profile Portrait of a Lady, as: John the Good of France in the Louvre, Paris; Archduke Rudolf IV of Austria in the Dom-und Diözesanmuseum, Vienna; Louis II of Anjou in the Bibliothèque Nationale, Paris; Richard II of England in Westminster Abbey, London; Wenceslaus, Duke of Brabant and Luxembourg in the Thyssen-Bornemisza Museum, Madrid)

The woman is wearing an early form balzo headdress over her hair, which has been plucked above her forehead to the point at which the balzo rests.
