= Francis of Baux =

French nobleman

- Duke of Andria
- Coat of arms
- Born: c. 1330
- Died: 23 April 1422 (aged 91–92)
- Noble family: House of Baux
- Spouses: Luisa de San Severino; Margaret of Taranto; Sueva Orsini
- Issue: James of Baux, Prince of Taranto and Achaea; Antonia of Baux, Queen of Sicily; Margaret of Baux, Countess of Saint-Pol
- Father: Bertrand III of Baux
- Mother: Marguerite d'Aulnay

Francis of Baux (French: François des Baux, Italian: Francesco del Balzo; c. 1330 – 23 April 1422) was the first Duke of Andria, Count of Montescaglioso and Squillace, and Lord of Berre, Mison, and Tiano. He was the son of Bertrand III of Baux, Count of Andria and Montescaglioso and his second wife, Marguerite d'Aulnay. Francis's father was a Senator of Rome, Captain General of Tuscany, and Justiciar of Naples. The half-royal Baux family was one of the greatest families of the kingdom after the Duke's marriage to Marguerite of Taranto in 1348.

== Status ==
In 1349, Francis was given an extensive grant by Louis, Prince of Taranto. Prince Louis had married Joanna I of Naples in 1346 as her second husband, and had become King of Naples; he was crowned in 1352/53. The King was brother to Francis's second wife, Margaret, whom he had married in 1348. Francis was created Duke of Andria and was the first magnate to be raised to ducal dignity in the kingdom. Andria had been a royal fief which the Duke's father received from Beatrice of Anjou, by virtue of her dower.

== Civil war ==
On the death of Philip II, Prince of Taranto in 1373, Marguerite and Francis claimed Taranto and Philip's Greek lands (chiefly the Principality of Achaea and its dependent territories) and titles for themselves and their son, James of Baux, as the last male descendant of Philip I, Prince of Taranto. Margaret's claim was supported by Pope Gregory XI. Queen Joanna, however, decided to exercise direct rule over the Prince of Taranto's Greek possessions. In April 1374, Queen Joanna decided to suppress the family and stripped Francis of all his lands and titles. This action led to a civil war between the Queen and the Baux family. An account is recorded in the Aragonese version of the Chronicle of the Morea.

== Family ==
Francis married three times.

In 1337, he married Luisa de San Severino, daughter of Tommaso III de San Severino, Count of Marsico; they had no children.

In 1348, Francis married Margaret of Taranto, daughter of Philip I, Prince of Taranto by his second wife, Catherine of Valois. She died about September 1380 in imprisonment. They had:

- James of Baux, Prince of Achaea and the last titular Latin Emperor of Constantinople.
- Antonia of Baux, queen consort to Frederick III, King of Sicily.

In 1381, Francis married Sueva Orsini, daughter of Nicolo Orsini by his first wife, Jeanne de Sabran. They had:

- Margaret of Baux; mother of Jacquetta of Luxembourg.
- William of Baux (Guglielmo del Balzo), Duke of Andria, married Maria Brunforte, by whom he had issue.
  - Francesco II del Balzo, Duke of Andria.

== Sources ==
- Baldwin, David (2004). Elizabeth Woodville: Mother of the Princes in the Tower. Sutton Publishing.
