= Lords of Baux =

Occitan nobility

Coat of arms of the Lords of Baux.

This is a list of the Lords, Barons and Marquisses of Baux.

== List of rulers of Baux ==
=== Lords of Baux of the House of Baux ===
- Pons the Younger (born c. 950, fl. 971-1028)
- Hugh I (born c. 970 – after 1059), son of the above
- William Hugh of Baux French: Guillaume Hugues or "Guilhem Uc" (after 1030 – 1105), son of the above
- Raymond I (before 1095 – 1150), son of the above
- Hugh II (reigned 1150 – 1167; retired to Sardinia where he died in 1179), son of the above
- Bertrand I (1167–1181), brother of Hugh II and son of Raymond I
- Hugh III (1181–1240), lord of Baux, viscount of Marseille, eldest son of Bertrand I
- Barral of Baux (Barral I, 1240–1268), son of Hugh III
- Bertrand III (1268–1305), son of the above
- Raymond II (1305–1322), son of the above
- Hugh IV (1322–1351), son of the above
- Robert (1351–1353), son of the above
- Raymond III (1353–1372), brother of Robert and son of Hugh IV
- John I (1372–1375), son of Raymond III
- Alice I (1372–1426), sister of John and daughter of Raymond III

This branch of the House of Baux was declared extinct in 1426. The domains were inherited by Counts of Provence. The House of Baux moved to Italy on 1263 following Charles I of Anjou (see del Balzo).

=== Lords of Baux of the House of Valois-Anjou ===
- René I (1426–1480), also king of Naples as René I of Naples
- Charles I (Charles IV, Duke of Anjou 1480–1482), son of

In 1482 the domains became part of the royal domain and the title passed to the French kings.

=== Lords of Baux of the House of Valois ===
- Louis I (1482–1483), also king of France as Louis XI
- Charles II (1483–1498), also king as Charles VIII
- Louis II (1498–1513), also king as Louis XII
- Francis I (1515–1547), also king as Francois I
- Henry I (1547–1559), also king as Henri II
- Francis II (1559–1560), also king as Francois II
- Charles III (1560–1574), also king as Charles IX
- Henry II (1574–1589), also king as Henri III

=== Lords of Baux of the House of Bourbon ===
- Henry III (1589–1610), also king of France and Navarre as Henri IV
- Louis III (1610–1643), also king of France and Navarre as Louis XIII

In 1513 Louis XII makes the Lordship of Baux into a Barony, which is ruled by a governor, who bears the title of baron.

From 1528 the Baron receives local assistance in the day-to-day governance of the Barony from a Captain-Visor.

==== Barons of Baux ====
- Bernardin of Baux (1513–1528)
- Anne de Montmorency (1528–1567)
- Honoré of Martins (1567–1582)
- James of Bauche (1582–1621)
- Anthony of Villeneuve (1621–1631)

After the death of Anne in 1567, the Captain-Visors become the strongmen of the Barony.

==== Captains-Visors of Baux ====
- Claude of Manville (1528-before 1553), his functions being assumed by his widow until 1553
- Pierre of Cotheron (1553–1560)
- John of Manville (1560–1562)
- John of Quiqueran-Ventabren (1562–1563)
- Gauchier of Quiqueran (1563–1564)
- Valentin of Grille (1564–1575)
- Peter of Véran (1575–1607)
- Peter of Savournin (1607–1618)
- Jack of Vérassy (1618–1631)

In 1631, the royal domain is sold by the king to the loyal community of Les Baux-de-Provence. In 1642 the king donates the title of Marquis of Baux to prince Antonio I of Monaco.

=== Marquesses of Baux of the House of Grimaldi ===
- Ercole
- Anthony I
- Honoré I
- Honoré II
- Honoré III
- Florestan I until 1841
- Charles 1841 - 1856
- Albert I, 1856–1889
- Louis, 1889–1922
- Charlotte, 1922–1944
- Rainier, 1944–1958
- Albert II, 1958–2014
- Jacques, 2014–present

Marquis of Baux (French: Marquis des Baux) is nowadays one of the Prince of Monaco's many hereditary titles, and one which is usually also given to the reigning Prince's eldest son.

With the exception of Princess Charlotte, styled as HSH The Princess Charlotte, the Marquis of Baux is officially styled as HSH Hereditary Prince of Monaco or HSH Hereditary Princess of Monaco during their period as marquis or marquise.

=== Lords of Berre, Meyragues, Puyricard and Marignane branch ===
- Bertrand II, second oldest son of Bertrand I of Baux, lord of Berre, Meyragues and Puyricard, and Marignane (1181–1201)
- ...

From this branch originated the family branches of the Lords of Berre, Lords of Meyrargues and Puyricard, who became extinct in 1349, and lords of Marignane, acquired by House of Valois-Anjou, as well as the Dukes of Andria.

=== Princes of Orange of the House of Baux-Orange ===
- Bertrand I of Baux (1171–1181)
- William I, count of Orange, youngest son of Bertrand I of Baux (1181–1218)
- Raymond I (1218–1282)
- Bertrand II (1281–1314)
- Raymond II (1314–1340)
- Raymond III (1340–1393)
- Mary of Baux-Orange (1393–1417), daughter, married John III of Chalon-Arlay

In 1417, the House of Chalon-Arlay, a cadet branch of the House of Ivrea succeeded as princes of Orange.

A brother of William I started the branch of the Lords of Courbezon (House of Baux-Courbezon), which became extinct in 1393. Another brother started the line of Lords of Suze, Solerieux and Barri (House of Baux-Suze-Solerieux-Barri), which became extinct and reverted afterwards to the counts of Orange.

== See also ==
- Les Baux-de-Provence
- Les Baux de Provence AOC
- Baussenque Wars (1144–1162)
- Il signore di Baux
