= Val d'Enfer =

Valley in Les Baux-de-Provence, France

Coordinates: 43.750°N 4.794°E

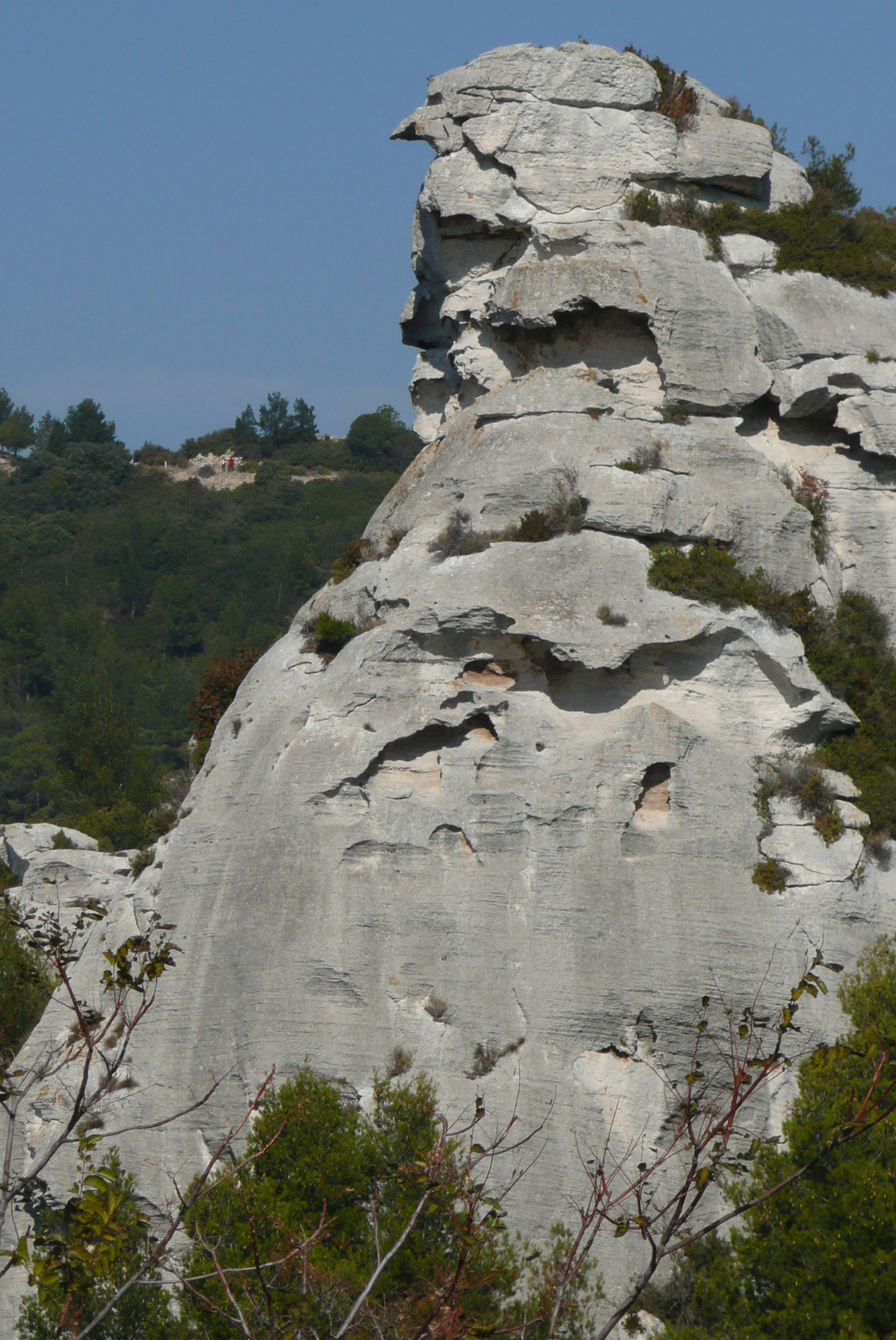
Jagged rocks of the Val d'Enfer

Val d'Enfer, is a valley cut into the rock by water erosion. It is located near the village of Les Baux-de-Provence in Provence south eastern France and it takes its name from the strangeness of its white limestone rock formations.
