= Balzo headdress =

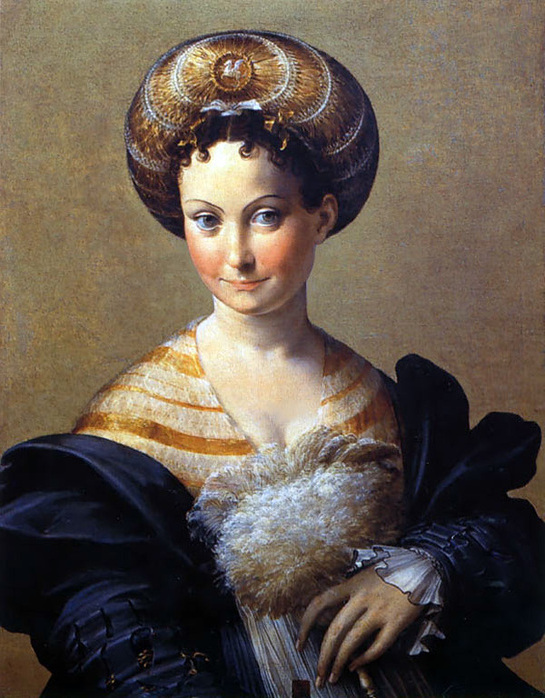
This portrait of an unknown Italian noblewoman has mistakenly been called the Turkish Slave because her headdress was considered a turban for centuries.

The Balzo was a headdress worn by noblewomen of Italy in the 1530s. It was donut-shaped but appeared turban-like from the front, though it was generally worn further back from the forehead exposing the hair, unlike a period turban.

It is assumed as a fashion invention by Isabella d'Este, first documented in letters in 1509 and 1512 and well copied in later years.

The headdress was a throwback to a larger rounded headdress from the 15th century in Italy that covered the hair of the wearer. Then the hairline was often plucked. Though mostly known as a woman's headdress, there is evidence that men also wore a form of the balzo.

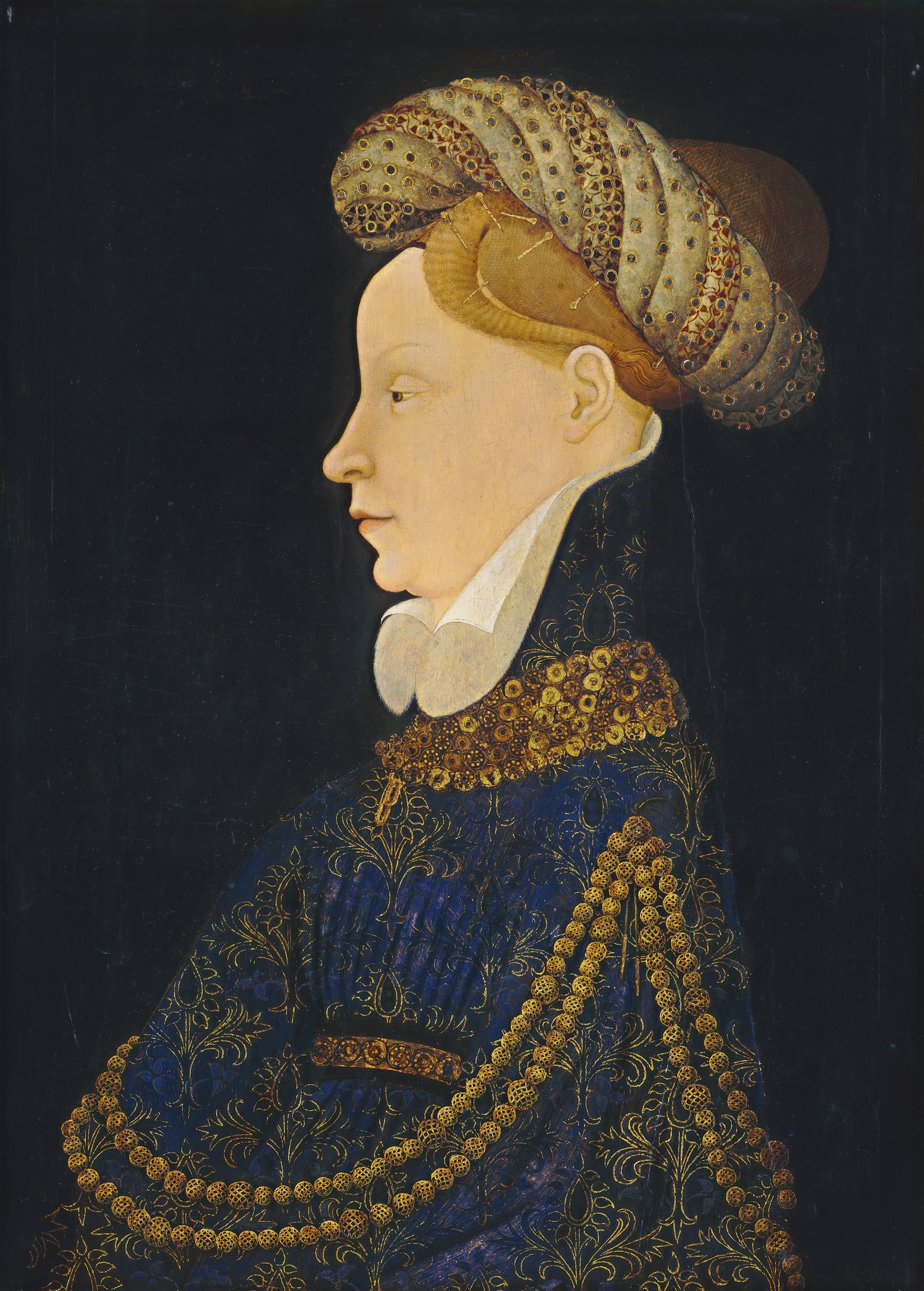
Profile Portrait of a Lady, c.1410 portrait of a woman wearing an "early balzo" with a plucked forehead

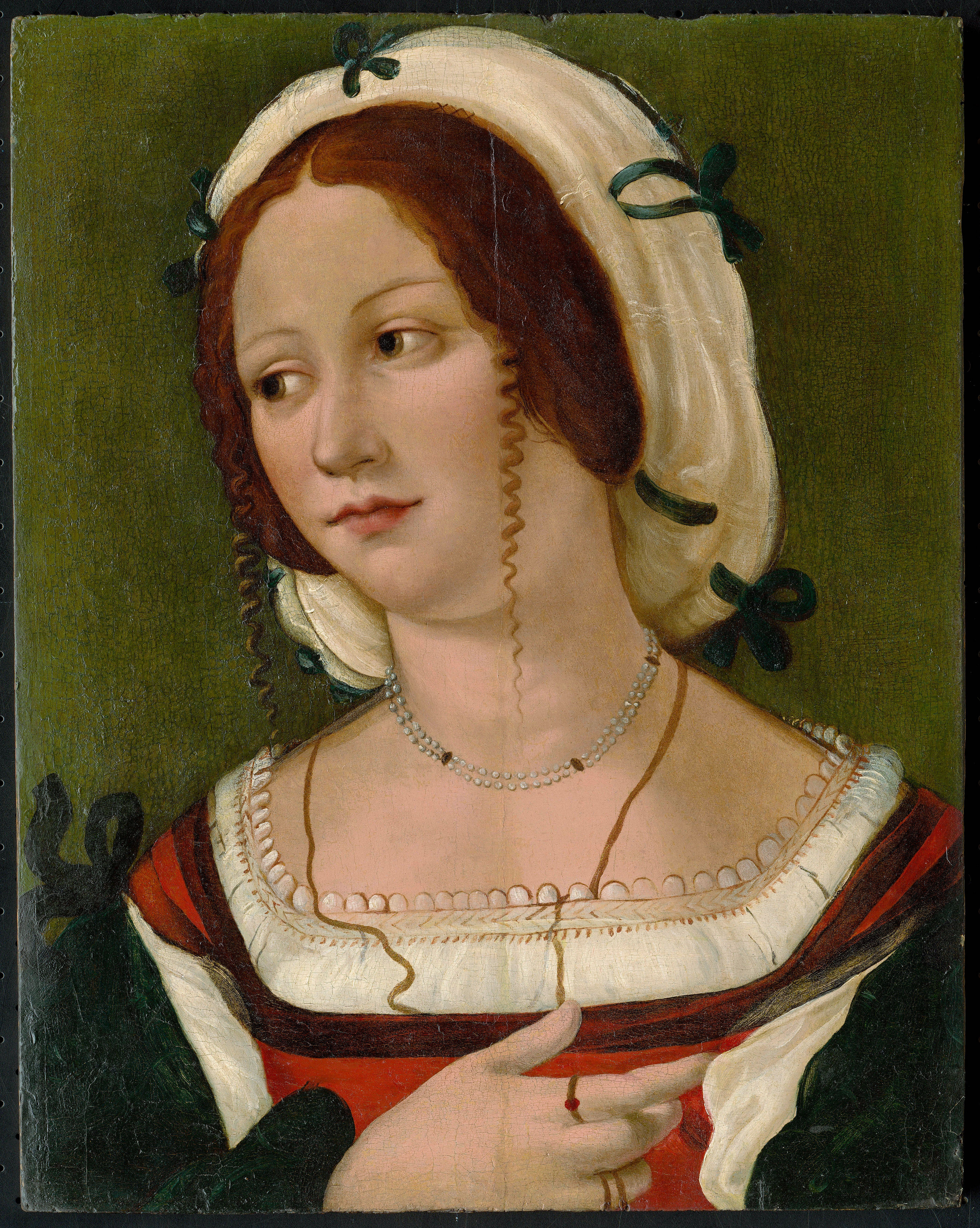
Francesco Francia attributed - likely Isabella d'Este in 1511

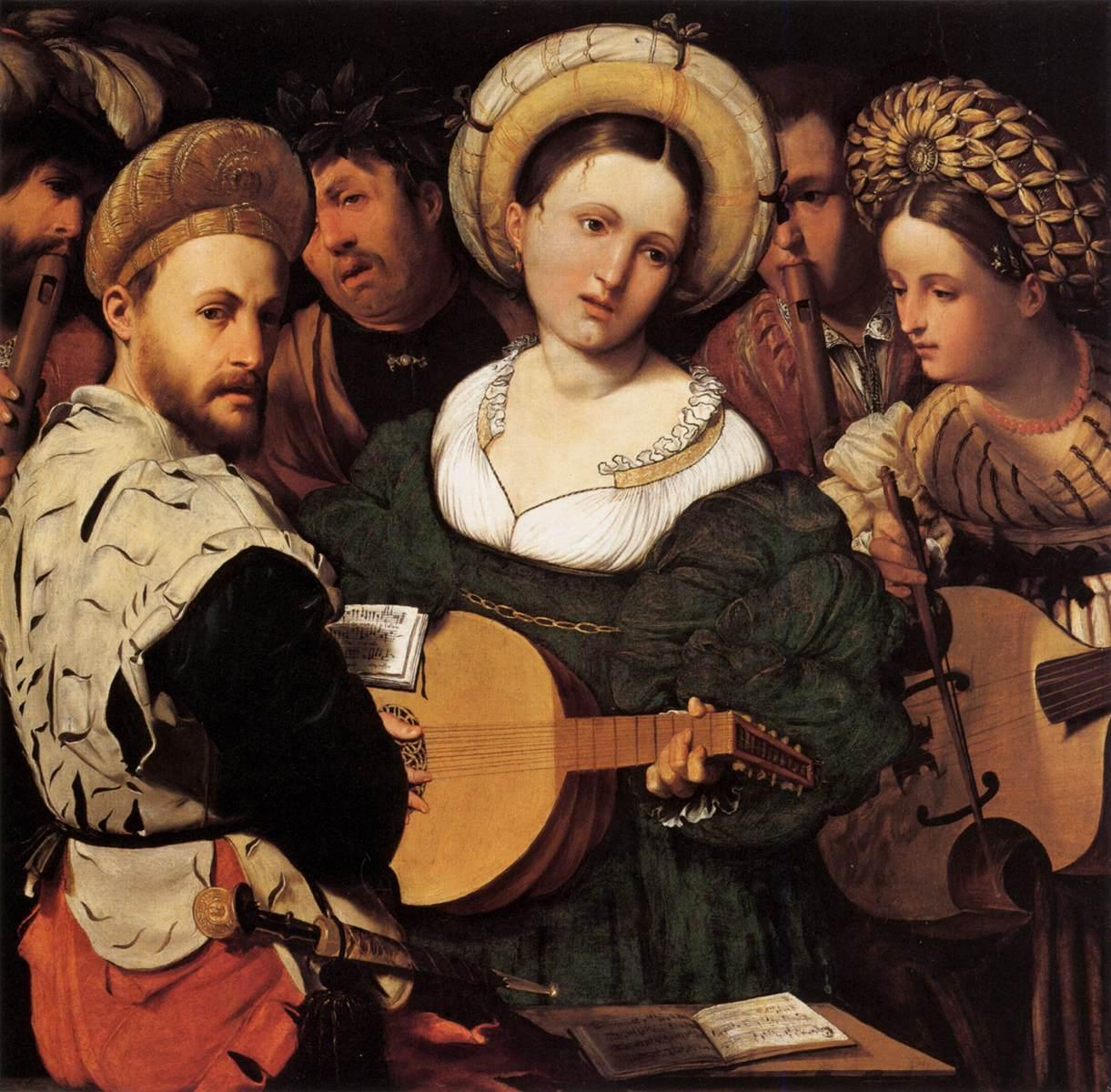
Two women and a man wearing a balzo, showing the differences in style
