= William II of Baux =

Prince of Orange (died 1239)

William II of Baux (died 1239) was a son of William of Baux. Following his father, William II carried the title of prince of Orange. The title had come to the House of Baux through a brother of Raimbaut of Orange, who was William II's paternal grandmother, Tiburge de Sarenom, the latter also referred to as Tiburge princess of Orange.

He had issue:

- William III of Baux (died 1257) prince of Orange.
- Bertrand of Baux
