= Tibors de Sarenom =

- Born: c. 1130
- Died: aft. 1198
- Spouse: Bertrand I of Baux
- Parents: Guilhelm d'Omelas (father); Tibors d'Aurenga (mother)

Tibors de Sarenom (French Tiburge; c. 1130 – aft. 1198) is the earliest attestable trobairitz, active during the classical period of medieval Occitan literature at the height of the popularity of the troubadours.

== Biography ==
Na Tibors si era una dompna de proensa dun castel d'En Blancatz que a nom sarrenom. Cortesa fo et enseignada. Auinens e fort maistra e saup trobar. E fo enamorada e fort amada per amor, e per totz los bos homes daquela encontrada fort honrada, e per totas las ualens dompnas mout tensuda e mout obedida. E felz aquestas coblas e mandet las al seu amador. Bels dous amics ben uos puesc en uer dir.

Na Tibors was a lady of Provence, from a castle of En Blacatz called Sarenom. She was courtly and accomplished, gracious and very wise. And she knew how to write poems. And she fell in love and was fallen in love with, and was greatly honored by all the good men of that region, and admired and respected by all the worthy ladies. . .

—vida of Tibors from troubadour manuscript H, a Lombard chansonnier, now Latin 3207 in the Biblioteca Vaticana, Rome

Tibors is one of eight trobairitz with vidas, short Occitan biographies, often more hypothetical than factual. Research into Tibors' the poet's identification with an independently recorded individual is hampered by the popularity of her name in Occitania during the period of her life.

Tibors was the daughter of Guilhem d'Omelas and Tibors d'Aurenga, who brought her husband the castle of Sarenom, probably Sérignan-du-Comtat in Provence or perhaps Sérignan in the Roussillon. Sadly for historians and Occitanists, Tibors and Guilhem had two daughters, both named Tibors, after their mother. It is possible but unlikely that Tibors d'Aurenga was herself the trobairitz. Since she was married in 1129 or 1130 and her daughters were married by 1150, it is unlikely they were born long after.

Raimbaut d'Orange, the famous troubadour, was a younger of son of Guilhem and Tibors and thus a younger brother of the two Tibors sisters. In 1150 the elder Tibors died and by her will left Raimbaut, then a minor, under the guardianship of her elder daughter and her son-in-law, the trobairitz' second husband, Bertran dels Baus. The younger sister, Tiburgette, was the recipient of a wedding gift from their father in that year (1150). In the will of her father, Guilhem, Tibors is referred to as autre Tiburge (the other Tibors), while her younger sister is given pre-eminence.

By 1150 (or 1155 if the dating of Tibors d'Aurenga's will is incorrect), Goufroy de Mornas, Tibors' first husband, had already died. She had no recorded children by him, but with Bertrand she had three sons: Uc, father of Barral of Marseille; Bertran, father of Raimon; and Guilhem, also a troubadour.

Tibors is said to have died soon after her husband (1180) in 1181 or 1182, but a document of her son Uc dated 13 August 1198 refers to "the advice of his mother Tibors".

== Poetry ==
Of Tibors' work only a single stanza of a canso with its attached vida and razo has survived. Nonetheless, she is mentioned in an anonymous ballad dated to between 1220 and 1245, where she acts as the judge of a game of poetry. Her only work goes like this:

Bels dous amics, ben vos posc en ver dir que anc non fo qu'ieu estes ses desir pos vos conven que.us tene per fin aman; ni anc no fo qu'ieu non agues talan, bels dous amics, qu'ieu soven no.us vezes; ni anc no fo sazons que m'en pentis, ni anc no fo, se vos n'anes iratz, qu'ieu agues joi tro que fosetz tornatz; ni [anc]. . .	Sweet handsome friend, I can tell you truly that I've never been without desire since it pleased you that I have you as my courtly lover; nor did a time ever arrive, sweet handsome friend, when I didn't want to see you often; nor did I ever feel regret, nor did it ever come to pass, if you went off angry, that I felt joy until you had come back; nor [ever]. . .

== Sources ==
- Bogin, Meg (1976). The Women Troubadours. Scarborough: Paddington. ISBN 0-8467-0113-8.
- Bruckner, M. T.; Shepard, L.; and White, S. (1995). Songs of the Women Troubadours. New York: Garland Publishing. ISBN 0-8153-0817-5.
- Egan, Margarita (1984). The Vidas of the Troubadours. New York: Garland Publishing. ISBN 0-8240-9437-9.
- Schutz, Alexander Herman (1972 [1950]). Biographies des troubadours. Ayer Publishing. ISBN 0-8337-4000-8.
