= Bertrand I of Baux =

Provençal nobleman

- Born: 1137
- Died: 1181 (aged 43–44)
- Spouse: Thiburge II of Orange

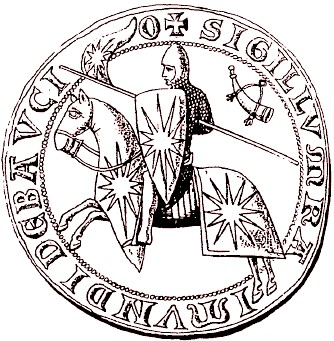
Seal of the first Baux-Orange.

Bertrand I of Baux was a lord of Baux of the house of Baux who inherited the Principality of Orange by marriage. He was a younger son of Raymond of Baux.

== Life ==
His mother was Étiennette de Provence (died around 1163), daughter of Gilbert I of Gévaudan, Viscount of Millau and Lodève and later count of Gévaudan, and Gerberge of Provence, Countess of Provence. Étiennette was the sister of Douce de Gévaudan, Countess of Provence, wife of Raymond Berengar III, Count of Barcelona. When the latter died in 1129, Raymond of Baux asserted his claim to the County of Provence, thus beginning the Baussenque Wars.

=== Prince of the Holy Roman Empire ===
During the wars, a significant event symbolized the reconciliation between the houses of Barcelona and the Baux. The young Alfonso II of Aragon owed his rescue to Bertrand of Baux, who, by taking him behind his horse, enabled him to escape from the enemy-held Château d'Albaron and return to the city of Arles. For a traditional friend of the House of Toulouse, this was a notably chivalrous act which aided the reconciliation of the Baux with the princes of the Aragon.

In 1173, Bertrand of Baux married Thiburge II of Orange, heiress of Orange. He had a fortified castle built on a hill overlooking the village of Suze. It is half-embedded in the ochre rock, featuring gigantic defensive ramparts, deep moats, a drawbridge, battlements, and a well.

=== Silvacane Abbey ===
In 1175, Bertrand of Baux began construction of the abbey church of Silvacane, where he was buried. The church, built between 1175 and 1230, features high naves covered with pointed barrel vaults, resting on powerful cruciform supports.

His brother, Hugues II of Baux, Lord of the Baux, not wanting to be a vassal of the Aragonese king, preferred to go into exile in Sardinia around 1177, where he died in 1179. His son Raymond II passed on the lordship to Bertrand in 1172. According to another source, Bertrand succeeded him directly and moved into the castle of Baux. According to other sources, it was in 1175 that he recovered the barony of Baux, the family's fiefdom, and thus took up the leadership of the family.

On July 30, 1178, the Holy Roman Emperor, Frederick I Barbarossa, was crowned king in Arles by the Archbishop of Arles. Bertrand des Baux received from the Emperor the right to call himself Prince of Orange, to take up arms, to exercise its prerogatives, and to wear the crown and all the insignia of sovereignty, including the right to wear a closed crown.

There is a mortuary roll of Bertrand of Baux dating from 1181. It is covered with the commemorations of 229 religious establishments. His date of death may have been Easter Day 1181, when he was killed with Raymond Berengar III of Provence in an ambush while on his way to wage war on Montpellier, or in 1183 according to Arthur Engel. His tomb is in Silvacane Abbey.

== Marriage and children ==
Coat of arms of the lords of Baux

Bertrand and Thiburge II of Orange had several children:

- Hugh III of Baux (1173–1240), the eldest, continued the elder branch of the Baux family. He was consul of Arles and viscount of Marseilles, and retained the lordship of Baux. His son Barral of Baux (c. 1217–1270) accompanied Charles of Anjou to Italy, and there, through his son Raymond became the ancestor of the line of the counts of Avellino.
- Thiburge des Baux
- William I of Baux (c. 1176–1218), Prince of Orange, became the head of the House of Orange, of whom we find several descendants in Italy, involved with their cousins, in the affairs of the Kingdom of Naples. He is the father of William II of Baux. From him descend the lords of Courthézon, including the Baux/Del Balzo di Soleto (hence the Orsini Del Balzo) and the Baux/Del Balzo d'Alessano and Specchia.
