= Francesco II del Balzo =

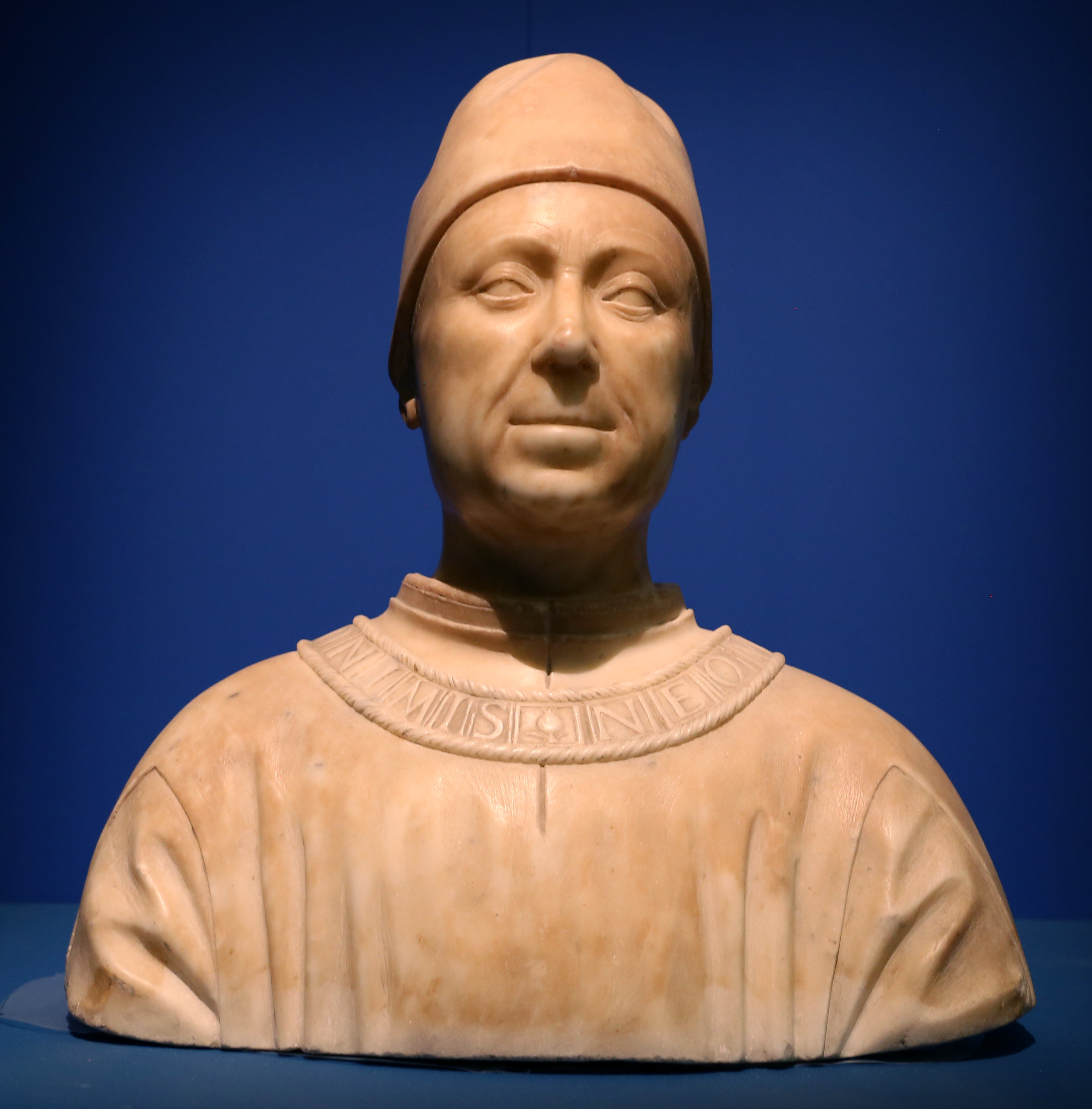
Domenico Gagini, Francesco II Del Balzo, Duke of Andria, 1470 ca.

Francesco II Del Balzo, Duke of Andria, (1410 – 8 August 1482) was a southern Italian nobleman.

== Biography ==
Francesco was born in Andria, the son of Guglielmo, second duke of that city, and a daughter of Federico di Brunforte count of Bisceglie. Around 1405, he married Sancia Chiaramonte.

In 1443 he took part in the first general Parliament of the Kingdom of Naples called by King Alfonso V at Benevento, after its conquest of southern Italy the previous year. In 1438 the king appointed Francesco as counsellor of the Regio Consiglio ("Royal Council") and sent him as ambassador at the court of emperor Frederick III.

In 1458, the new King Ferdinand I sent him to Pope Callixtus III with the task to receive the investiture of the Kingdom of Naples; Francesco was also sent to pay homage to new pope Pius II after Calixtus' death. In 1459 Francesco was the Neapolitan representative at the diet of Mantua where a crusade against the Ottoman Turks was to be discussed. Taking advantage of the duke's absence, a distant relative, Giovanni Antonio Orsini Del Balzo, prince of Taranto, tried to capture Andria, which was defended by Francesco's son Pirro. Francesco returned immediately to participate in the defense, but in 1462 both he and his son were taken prisoners.

After the defeat of Giovanni Antonio and other southern Italian rebels who had sided for John II of Anjou against king Ferdinand, Francesco obtained back all his lands. In exchange for loyalty, he was appointed Grand Constable of the Kingdom of Naples.

He died in 1482. His body is housed in the church of San Domenico at Andria, in a tomb with a bust attributed to Francesco Laurana or Domenico Gagini.

== Sources ==
- Porzio, C. (1859). La congiura de' baroni. Naples.
- del Balzo di Presenzano, Antonello (2003). A l'asar Bautezar! I del Balzo ed il loro tempo. Naples.
