= Les Baux-de-Provence =

Commune in Provence-Alpes-Côte d'Azur, France

Les Baux-de-Provence Lei Bauç de Provença (Occitan)
- Commune
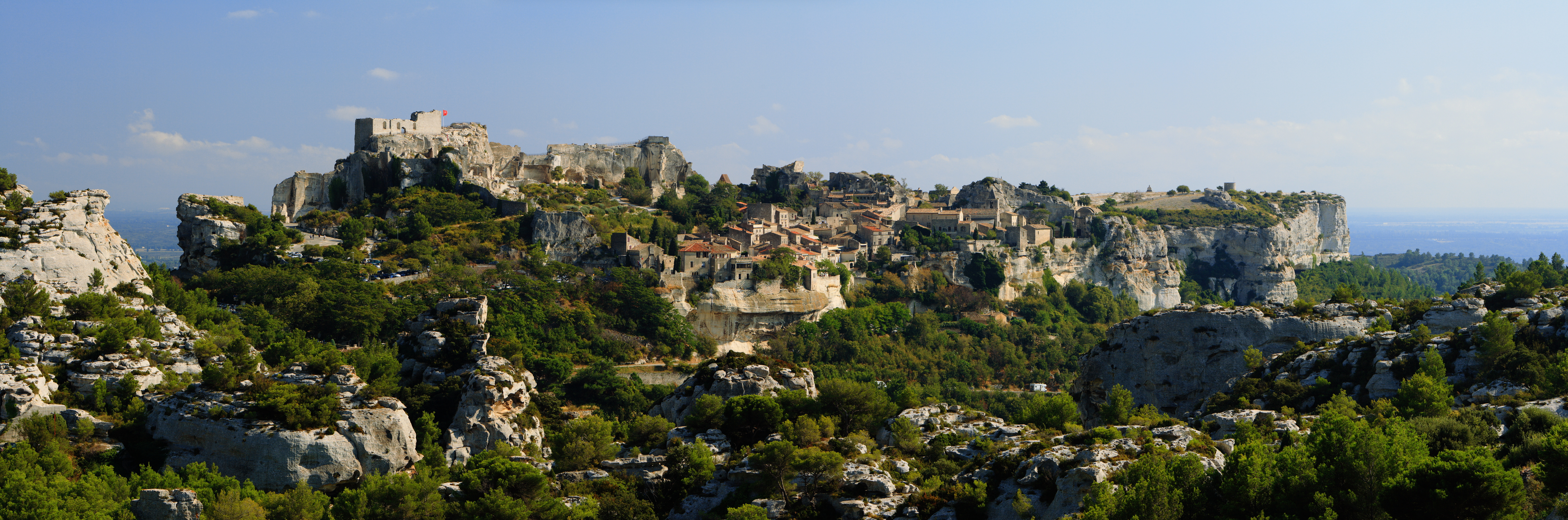
- View of the village and its castle from the northwest

- Flag Coat of arms
- Location of Les Baux-de-Provence
- Location within France Location within Provence-Alpes-Côte d'Azur
- Coordinates: 43°44′38″N 4°47′43″E
- Country: France
- Region: Provence-Alpes-Côte d'Azur
- Department: Bouches-du-Rhône
- Arrondissement: Arles
- Canton: Salon-de-Provence-1
- Intercommunality: Vallée des Baux-Alpilles

Government
  - Mayor (2026–32): Anne Poniatowski (Independent)
- Area^{1}: 18.07 km^{2} (6.98 sq mi)
- Highest elevation: 310 m (1,020 ft)
- Lowest elevation: 52 m (171 ft)
- Population (2023): 264
  - Density: 14.6/km^{2} (37.8/sq mi)
- Demonym(s): Baussenques, Baussencs
- Time zone: UTC+01:00 (CET)
  - Summer (DST): UTC+02:00 (CEST)
- INSEE/Postal code: 13011 /13520
- Website: www.lesbauxdeprovence.com
- ^{1} French Land Register data, which excludes lakes, ponds, glaciers > 1 km^{2} (0.386 sq mi or 247 acres) and river estuaries.

Les Baux-de-Provence (French pronunciation: [le bo də pʁɔvɑ̃s]; Provençal: Lei Bauç de Provença (classical norm) or Li Baus de Prouvènço (mistralian norm)), commonly referred to simply as Les Baux, is a rural commune in the Bouches-du-Rhône department in the Provence-Alpes-Côte d'Azur region in Southern France.

It is located in the Alpilles mountains, northeast of Arles, atop a rocky outcrop that is crowned with a ruined castle overlooking the plains to the south. Its name refers to its site: in Provençal, bauç is a rocky spur. From the village name the word bauxite was coined for aluminium ore when first discovered there by geologist Pierre Berthier in 1821. Until 13 August 1958, the commune was officially named Les Baux.

Renamed after the historical province of Provence, it is a member of Les Plus Beaux Villages de France (The Most Beautiful Villages of France) Association and has over 1.5 million visitors per year although it has only about 20 residents in the upper part of the commune and 264 (as of 2023) for the whole commune. Inhabitants of the commune are known as Baussencs (masculine) and Baussenques (feminine) in French. The commune is part of Alpilles Regional Natural Park.

== History ==
=== Prehistory ===
The defensive capabilities of Les Baux have always made it an attractive location for human habitation. Traces of habitation have been found and dated to 6000 BC in the Costapéra cave which was discovered in 1928 and which houses a collective burial ground from the early Bronze Age. The site was used by the Celts as a fort or oppidum around the 2nd century BC. Peripheral areas or castrum developed very early as evidenced by the Trémaïé. The way from the Les Baux oppidum to the plains north of the Alpilles was by a protohistoric way through the valley of Laval and the town of Glanon which later took the name Glanum.

=== Antiquity ===
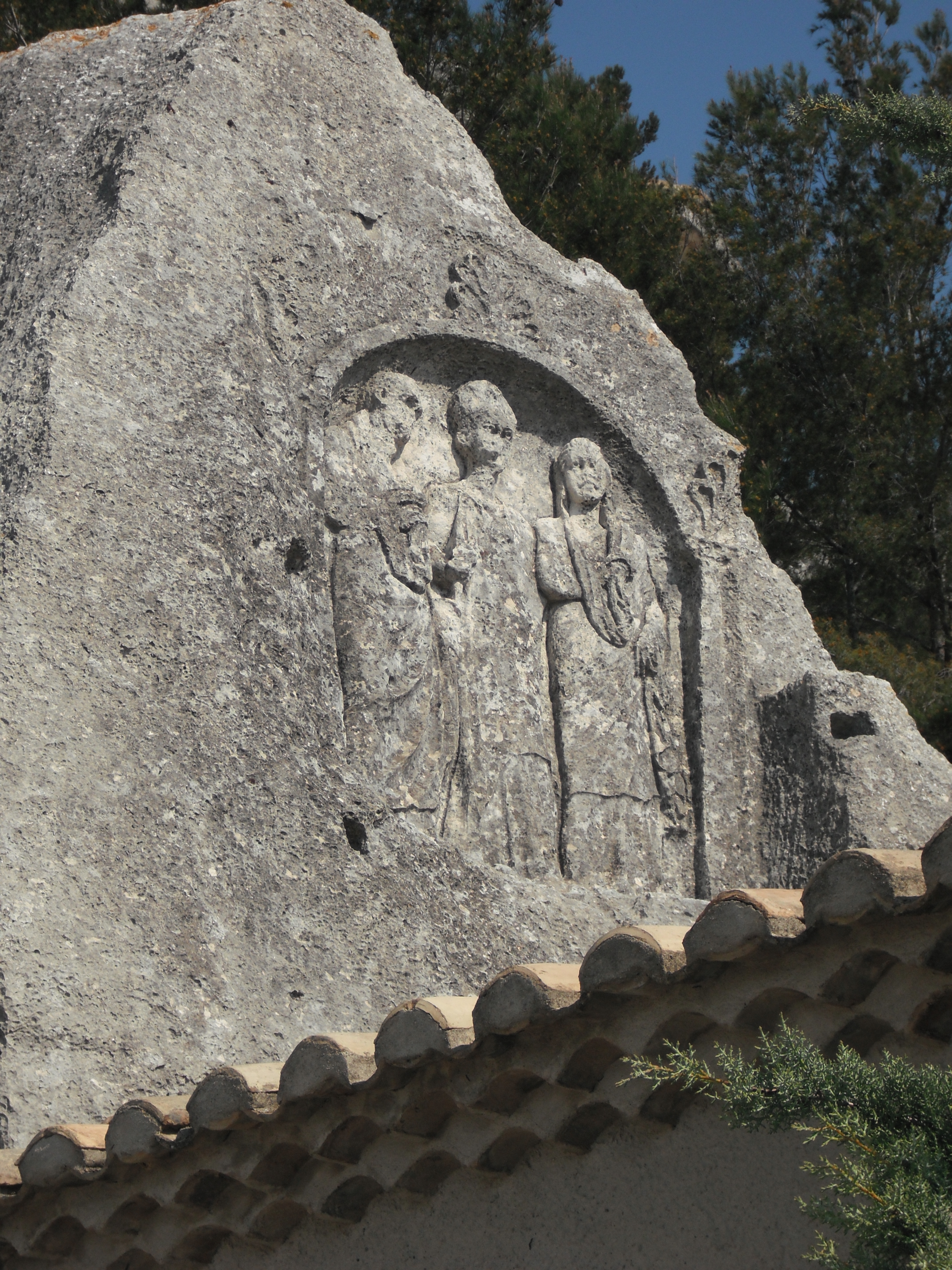
Trémaïé Bas-relief

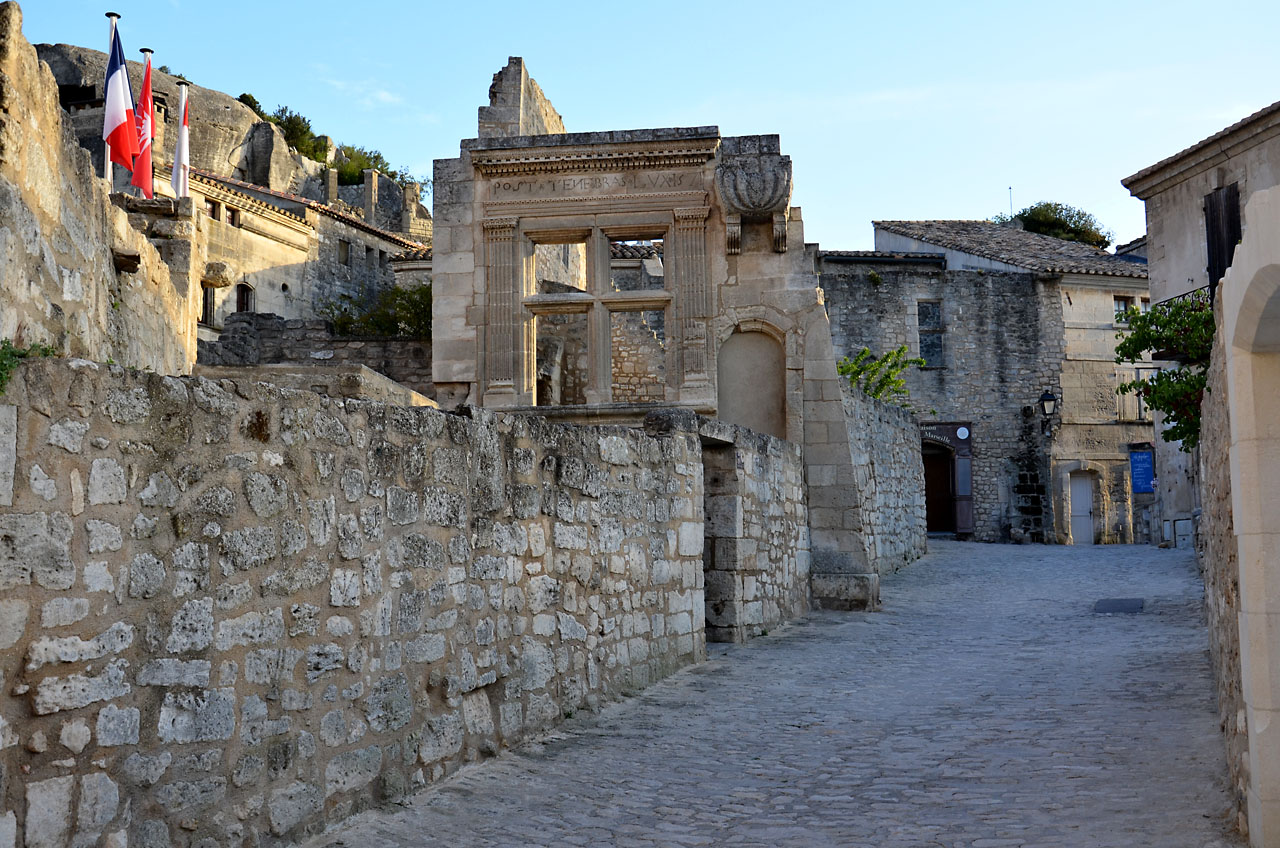
Ancient village

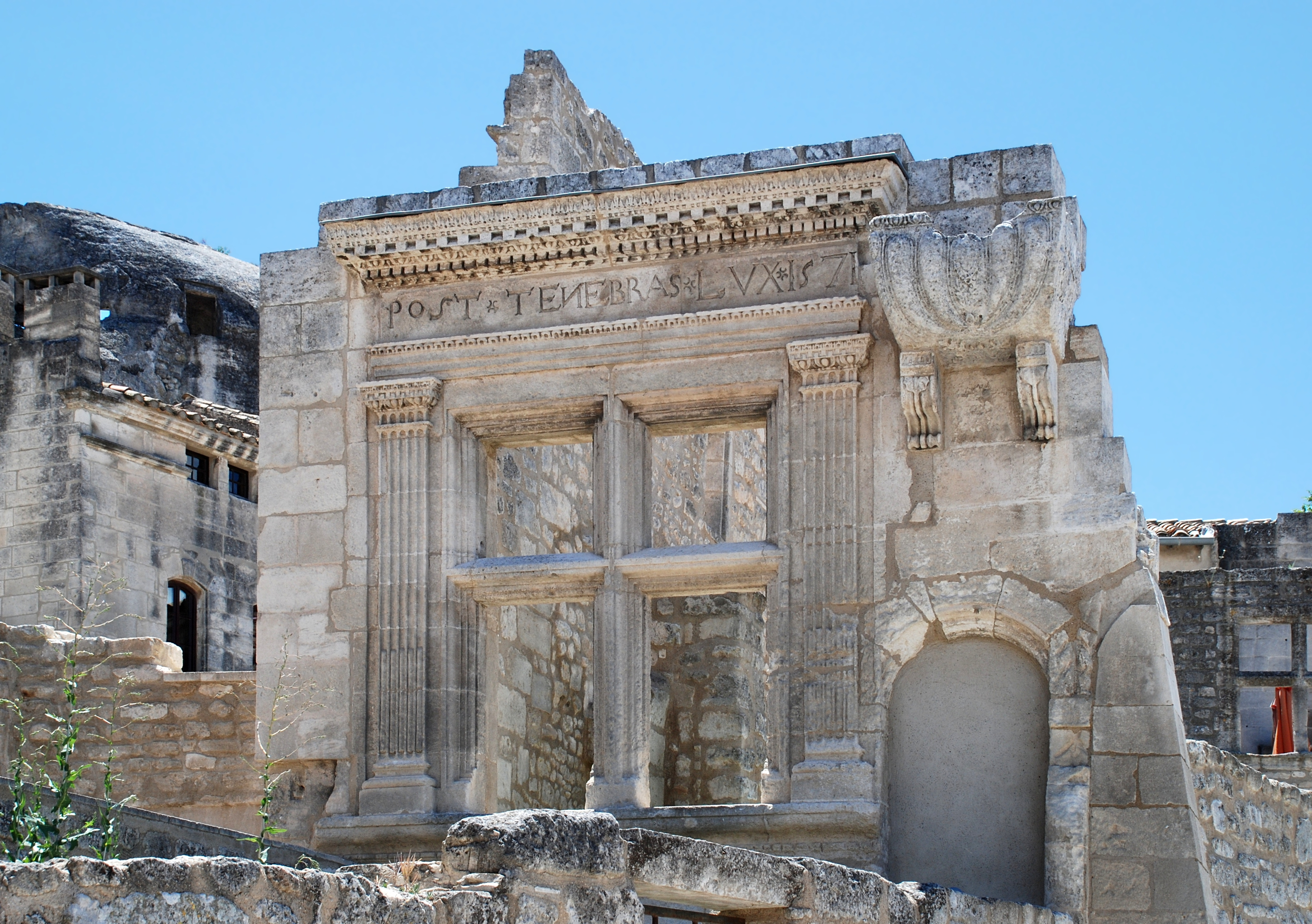
Fenêtre "Post Tenebras Lux" (English: Light after darkness)

While protohistory was strongly marked by pastoralism and agriculture in the Alpilles, limestone was also extracted from quarries around Les Baux where a workshop from the end of the 2nd and early 1st centuries BC has been found. In the second part of the Iron Age (7th to 6th centuries. BC), the population was sedentary and began to build durable houses. The castrum was structured like a village with its streets and houses. The process of permanent construction was in parallel with the intensification of economic exchanges with Mediterranean traders. In exchange for luxury goods, the inhabitants of the Alpilles produced grain and achieved a state of autarky with a real trading economy. Over the following centuries the population of the Alpilles consistently decreased: the Greek colony at Arles attracted many people from across the region.

=== Middle Ages ===
In the Middle Ages the area became the stronghold of a feudal domain covering 79 towns and villages. The fortress was built from the 11th to the 13th century over seven hectares. The princes of Les Baux controlled Provence for many years and they gained a formidable reputation. They were said to be descended from the Biblical Magi Balthazar and their coat of arms was a silver star with sixteen branches as a reminder that, according to the Gospel, it guided the three wise men to Bethlehem. Their motto was: "Au hasard, Balthazar" ("To chance, Balthazar").

As a medieval stronghold on the borders of Languedoc, Comtat Venaissin and Provence, the fortress had a turbulent military history and has been the subject of many assaults. The solid dungeon that still dominates the village today reiterates the importance of this castle which was a desirable possession in the Middle Ages.

At the end of the Baussenque Wars in the 12th century the princes of Les Baux were defeated. The large castle began to be renowned for its highly cultivated court and chivalrous conduct. The estate finally came to an end in the 15th century after the death of the last princess of Les Baux.

The death of Queen Joanna I of Naples led to a crisis of succession to the County of Provence. The cities of the Aix Union (1382–1387) supported Charles, Duke of Durazzo, against Louis I, Duke of Anjou. The King of France, Charles VI, intervened and sent the Seneschal of Beaucaire, Enguerrand d'Eudin, who rallied Guillaume III Roger de Beaufort. Les Baux, the possession of the Roger, was thus neutral at the beginning of war and on the Angevin side at the end of the decade.

=== Late Middle Ages ===
Les Baux, together with Provence, was then attached to the crown of France. Under the rule of the Manville family, the village became a center of Protestantism and even tried a rebellion against the crown. In 1631, tired of conflict, the people negotiated with the king for the redemption of the castle territory and the right to dismantle the fortifications, "which were a refuge for rebels". Louis XIII consented on 5 August.

In 1642 the town was offered to the Grimaldi family as a marquisate in favour of Hercule de Grimaldi, Prince of Monaco (1642–1780). The title Marquis of Les Baux is still carried by the Prince of Monaco. Administratively, the town is entirely French and the title of Marquis of Les Baux is traditionally given to the heir to the throne of Monaco. Jacques, the son of the current Prince of Monaco Albert II, carries among his many titles that of Marquis of Les Baux.

=== Modern Period ===
In 1822 bauxite was discovered in the area by geologist Pierre Berthier. The ore was intensively mined until its exhaustion at the end of the 20th century.

== Toponymy ==
The name Les Baux-de-Provence derives from the Occitan bauç (pronounced "baws") in the classical norm or baus in the Mistralian Provençal norm, meaning "sheer drop," "cliff," or "rocky escarpment." This root appears in other toponyms, such as the baou of Saint-Jeannet.

According to British historian Edward Gibbon, "Baux" may have evolved from "Balthes" (meaning "bold" in Gothic), referencing a noble Visigothic family of the same name, who claimed descent from the god Gaut.

By a decree dated 7 August 1958, published in the Official Journal on 12 August 1958 and effective 13 August 1958, La Baux officially became Les Baux-de-Provence. In Provençal Occitan, the commune is called Lei Bauç de Provènça (classical norm) or Li Baus de Prouvènço (Mistralian norm).

Bauxite, the aluminum ore, takes its name from this commune, where it was first mined.

== Geography ==
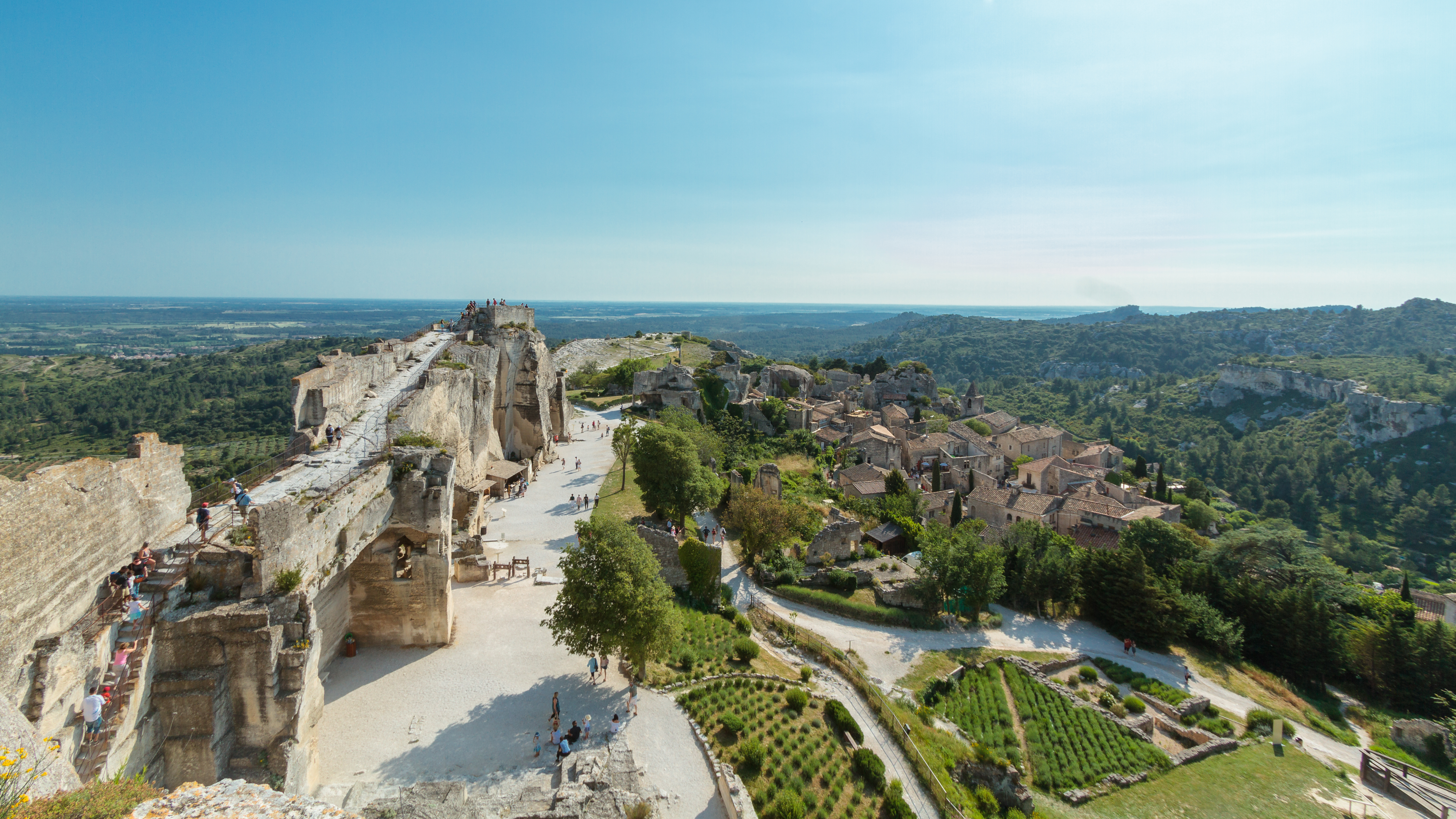
Château des Baux

Les Baux-de-Provence is located in the foothills of the Alpilles in the Parc naturel régional des Alpilles some 22 kilometers south of Avignon and 15 kilometers northeast of Arles. Access to the commune is by the D27 road from Maussane-les-Alpilles in the south which passes through the village and continues north to join the D99 east of Mas-Blanc-des-Alpilles. The D5 also comes from Maussane-les-Alpilles in the south and passes through the east of the commune as it goes north to Saint-Rémy-de-Provence. The D27A links the two roads in the commune. The D78F branches from the D27 in the commune and goes south-west to join the D17 west of Paradou. Apart from the village there are the hamlets of Mes de Mai, Carita and Manville. The commune is farmland in the southeast and forested hills in the rest.

The commune is traversed by numerous streams which are called "gaudres". A gaudre (from the Provençal gaudre meaning "small stream") refers to a river often dry in summer and with low flow the rest of the year. The main gaudres in the commune are the Gaudre de Valmouriane with numerous tributaries flowing north to join the Canal du Vigueirat north of Mas-Blanc-des-Alpilles. The Gaudre du Mas de Chevrier also with numerous tributaries flows west to join the Gaudre d'Auge west of the commune. The Gaudre d'Entreconque flows from the northeast to south to join the Gaudre de la Foux which continues south to join the Canal des Pompes south of Maussane-les-Alpilles.

=== Climate ===
The climate in Les Baux-de-Provence, as in the rest of the Alpilles, is considered Mediterranean. The winters are mild and dry and summers hot and dry. The average maximum temperature is in July and August (29 °C) with the lowest average minimum temperature in December and January (+ 3 °C). The wettest month is January with an average of 7 days of rain as against two days in July. The Alpilles region receives more rainfall than the shores of the Mediterranean: 500 mm / year in Camargue against 600 to 700 mm / year in Les Baux. Major frosts are rare and were more frequent in the 19th century as evidenced by repeated freezing of the Rhône which has been virtually unknown since then.

The mistral violently blows from the north or north-west especially in winter and spring. The Alpilles deflect the wind but it blows in Les Baux almost as strongly as in the north of the chain. The mistral blows strongly 100 days a year on average and less strongly on 83 days leaving only 182 days a year without wind. There are two types of mistral: the "white mistral" on clear days and the "black mistral", rarer, which is accompanied by rain.

=== Flora and fauna ===
The flora in the commune is mainly xerophytic and Mediterranean Phytochorion. The botanist Bernard Girerd counted 800 plant species in 1992. Apart from the olive tree, characteristic of a maussanais landscape, there are also hackberries, small sized Kermes oak, and Shadbush. Protected plant species, such as the summer snowflake (Leucojum aestivum) and Hélianthème (Helianthemum lavandulaefolium), are found at the bottom of the valleys.

Many animal species nest in the Alpilles and can be seen in the commune. The most famous is the Bonelli's eagle, a protected species, as well as the Egyptian vulture, the lesser kestrel, and the Eurasian eagle-owl. The arid rocks are home to a species of lizard emblematic of the Alpilles: the ocellated lizard which is also considered threatened and protected.

There are many mammals in the commune, especially in the valleys. Wild boar abounds and its population is growing. Conversely, the number of hares and rabbits have tended to decrease. The reason seems to be the outbreak of myxomatosis in 1953 that caused havoc in the population, and, since the end of the 20th century, Rabbit haemorrhagic disease causing the decline of the species. The scarcity of these animals could pose longer-term problems for the survival of species of birds of prey that feed on them.

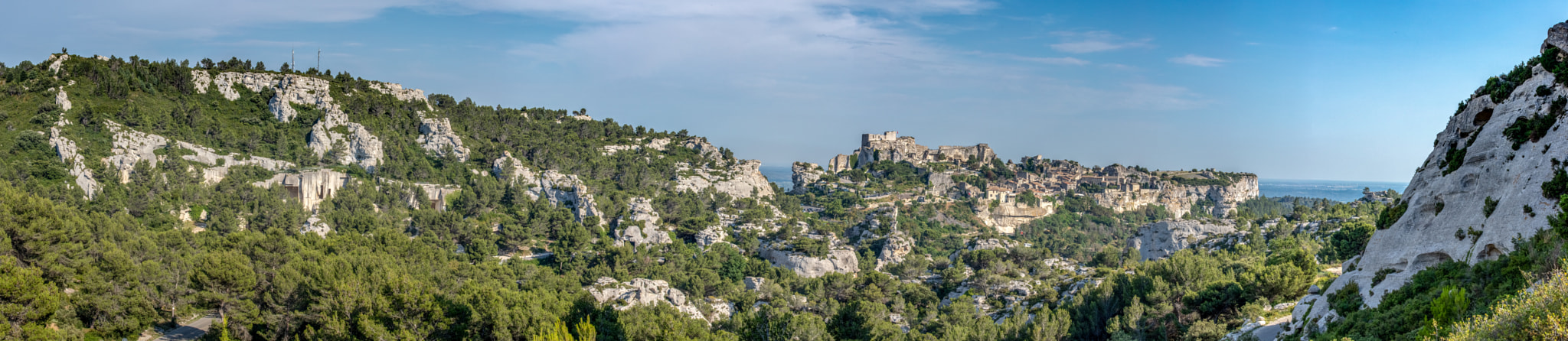
A view of Les Baux-de-Provence

== Economy ==
=== Olive growing sector ===
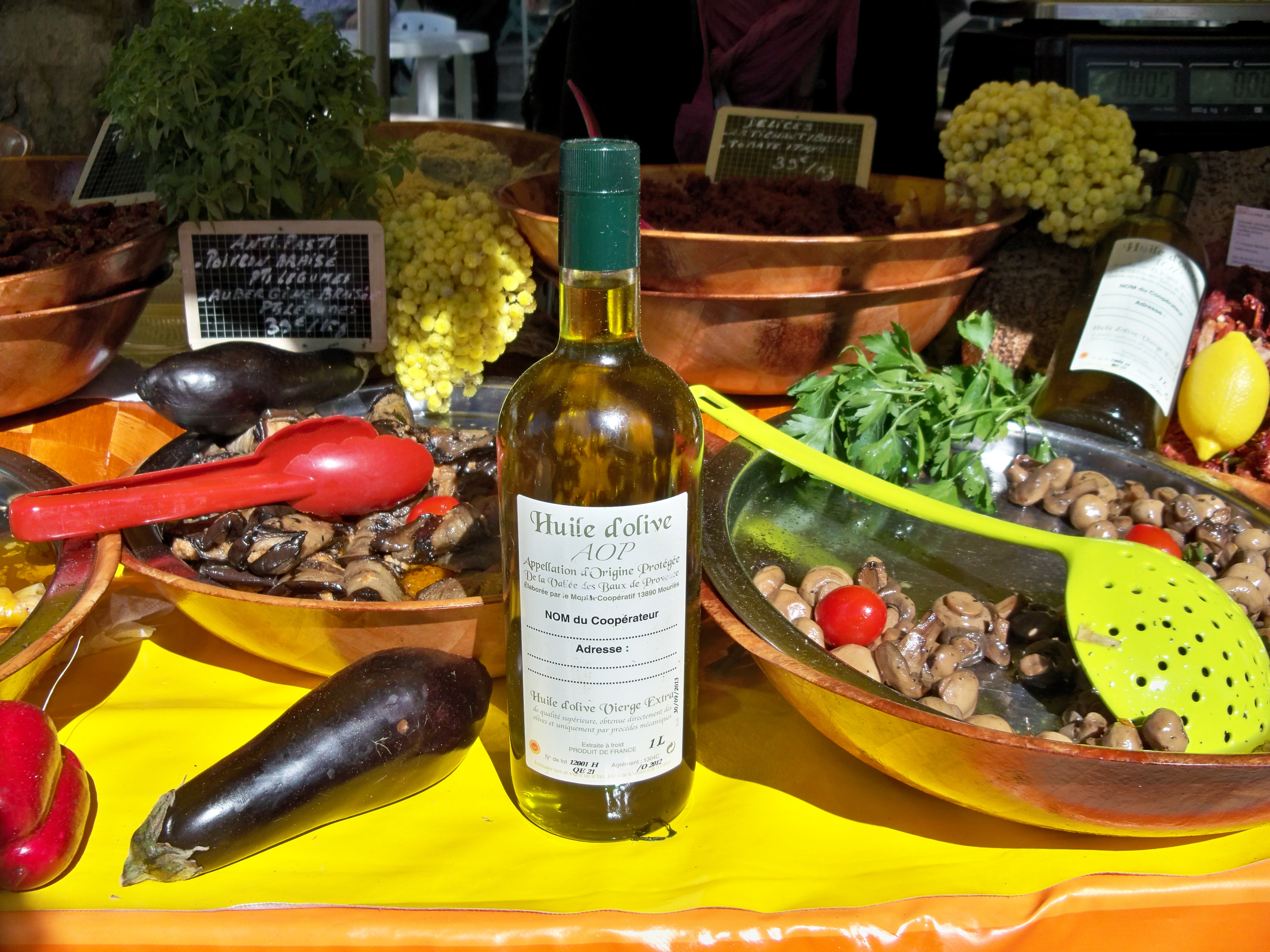
Les Baux-de-Provence olive oil

The commune produces Olive oil of the valley of Les Baux-de-Provence which is protected by the appellation d'origine contrôlée (AOC) by a decree issued by INAO on 27 August 1997. The olive varieties that go into its preparation are: Salonenque, Béruguette, Grossane, and Verdale of Bouches-du-Rhône. Crushed olives and black olives are also produced that fall under the INAO decree. The varieties of crushed olives broken are Salonenque and Béruguette. For black olives only the variety Grossane is acceptable.

=== Wine production ===
The commune is classified AOC for its Coteaux-des-Baux-en-Provence wines. This AOC was created by decree on 20 April 1995 for red and rosé wines. They were first classified VDQS by an order of 23 January 1956 for Coteaux-d'Aix-en-Provence. A second decree dated 24 December 1985 allowed the use of the generic name Les Baux recognizing the specific identity of the vineyards of the Les Baux region covering seven communes in the Alpilles. Production is 15,500 hectolitres per year: 75% red and 25% rosé.

== Culture ==
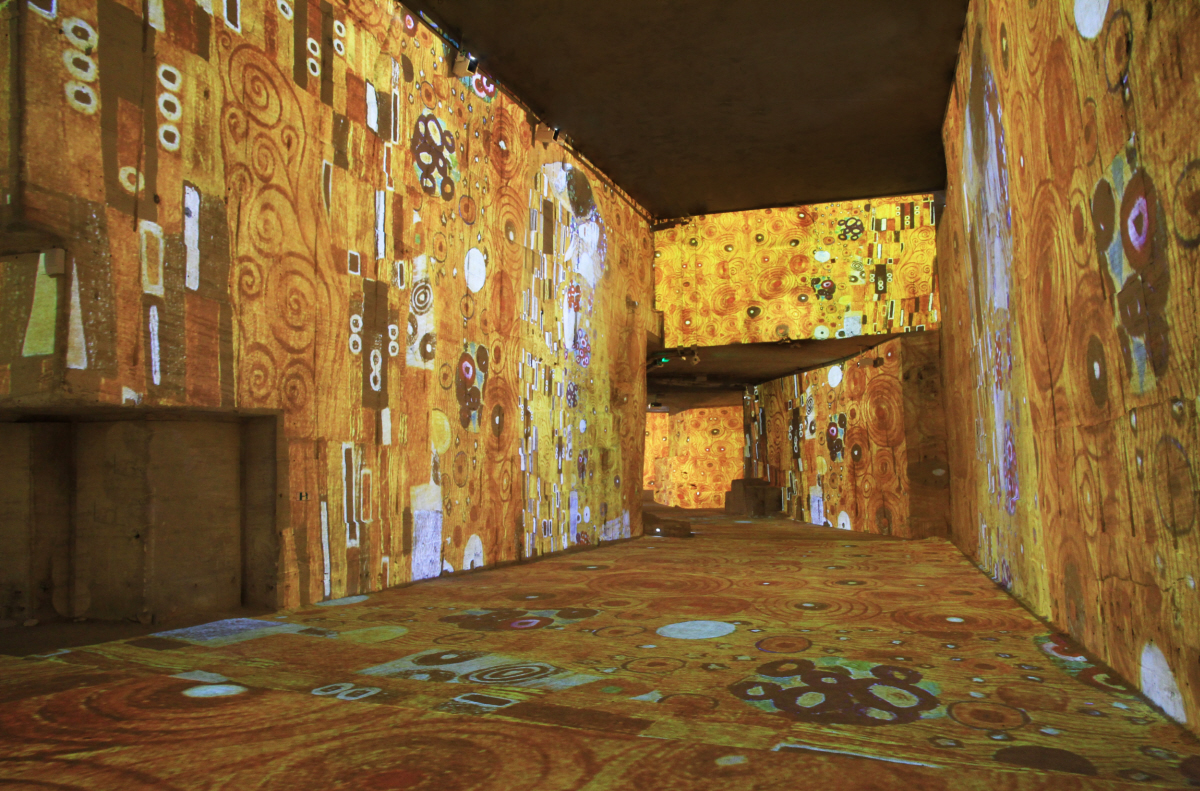
Klimt exhibition at the Carrières de Lumière

Christmas at Les Baux in the Church of Saint Vincent is held on Christmas Eve during midnight mass. This is primarily a live nativity scene, which takes place before the pastorage ritual developed in the pastoral world and dating back to the 16th century. This traditional ceremony was abandoned during the 19th century but was revived in 1902: a cart pulled by a ram, decorated with leaves and candles, brings a newborn lamb. Each shepherd, in turn, kisses the feet of the child Jesus then passes the lamb hand to hand before giving an offering.

Carrières de Lumières, established in 1976 as the Cathédrale d'Images, is a permanent show in which large bright images are projected on the stone walls of huge galleries dug into the rock of the Val d'Enfer on the road to Maillane. The wall surface used extends over 4,000 m^{2}. Cathédrale d'Images is a fairy and giant slide show in the dark projected on the limestone walls of the quarry where the viewer is immersed in a visual and musical universe. Despite its success, the Cathédrale d'images had to stop its activities in Les Baux-de-Provence at the end of 2010 after refusing a Public Service Delegation. The municipal council then entrusted the management of the site to the Culturespaces company who operate under the name of Carrières de Lumières.

=== Exhibitions ===
In 2019, Stefan Szczesny exhibited in the whole village of Les Baux-de-Provence. The German artist, living in Saint-Tropez showed about 30 of his monumental "shadow sculptures" as well as glass sculptures from Murano, ceramics and paintings.

=== Filming location ===
- The End of the Day (1938)
- Testament of Orpheus (1959)
- Maniac (1963)
- Dead Tired (1994)
- Ronin (1998)
- The Amazing Race (2001; 2017)
- Days of Glory (2006)
- Chanel Cruise 2021/22 Fashion Show (2021)

== Demographics ==
Historical population

Year	Pop.	±% p.a.
1800	394	—
1806	575	+6.50%
1821	506	−0.85%
1831	510	+0.08%
1836	498	−0.48%
1841	495	−0.12%
1846	484	−0.45%
1851	431	−2.29%
1856	412	−0.90%
1861	404	−0.39%
1866	415	+0.54%
1872	395	−0.82%
1876	360	−2.29%
1881	350	−0.56%
1886	367	+0.95%
1891	337	−1.69%
1896	338	+0.06%
1901	355	+0.99%

Year	Pop.	±% p.a.
1906	301	−3.25%
1911	300	−0.07%
1921	216	−3.23%
1926	220	+0.37%
1931	204	−1.50%
1936	198	−0.60%
1946	151	−2.67%
1954	180	+2.22%
1962	253	+4.35%
1968	295	+2.59%
1975	367	+3.17%
1982	433	+2.39%
1990	457	+0.68%
1999	434	−0.57%
2007	369	−2.01%
2012	465	+4.73%
2017	355	−5.26%
2023	264	−4.82%

Source: EHESS and INSEE
