= Bertrand III of Baux =

Italian noble (1295–1347)

Bertrand III of Baux (also known as Bertrando Del Balzo), Count of Andria, Montescaglioso, and Squillace, Lord of Berre, Senator of Rome, Captain-General of Tuscany, and Justiciar of Naples, was born in August 1295 at Andria, Italy to Bertrand II of Baux and Berengaria of Andria. He married, as his first wife, Beatrice of Anjou, daughter of King Charles II of Naples, in 1309; she died c. 1321. His daughter was:

- Marie des Baux (Italian: Maria Del Balzo D'Angiò), who married Humbert II of Viennois

He married a second time to Marguerite d'Aulnay in about 1324. Their children were:

- Francis of Baux, Duke of Andria, Count of Montescaglioso and Squillace, and Lord of Berre, Mison, and Tiano. He had three wives: Luisa de San Severino, Margaret of Taranto and Sueva Orsini.
- Blanche of Baux (or Bianca del Balzo)
- Isabelle of Baux (or Isabella del Balzo), wife of Antonio Sanseverino, Count of Marsico (brother of Luisa above: two of the children of Tommaso III, himself son of Enrico and grandson of Tommaso II Sanseverino)
- Sancie of Baux (or Sancia del Balzo), wife of John of Enghien, Count of Lecce, and mother of Mary of Enghien who married 1st Raimondello Orsini del Balzo, Prince of Taranto, and 2nd King Ladislaus of Naples.

He died on 15 September 1347 in Naples, Italy and was buried at San Domenico Maggiore.

== Sources ==
- Baldwin, David (2004). Elizabeth Woodville: Mother of the Princes in the Tower. Sutton Publishing.
- Dykmans, M. (1970). Robert d'Anjou, roi de Jérusalem et de Sicile: la vision bienheureuse. Traité envoyé au pape Jean XXII (in French). Pontificia Univ. Gregoriana.
- Setton, Kenneth Meyer (1976). The Papacy and the Levant, 1204-1571: The thirteenth and fourteenth centuries. American Philosophical Society.
