= Raimbaut d'Aurenga =

12th-century Occitan nobleman

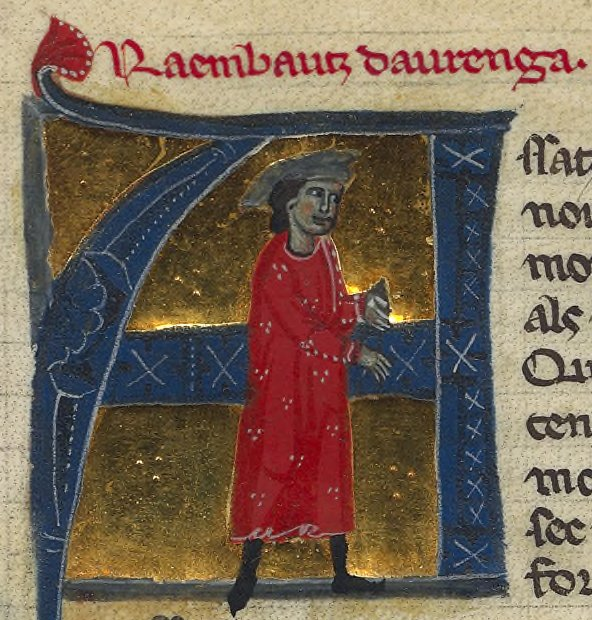
Raimbaut depicted in a 13th-century chansonnier

Raimbaut of Orange (Old Provençal: Raimbaut d'Aurenga; c. 1147 – 1173) was the lord of Orange and Aumelas and an influential troubadour in the Kingdom of Arles in the Holy Roman Empire. His properties included the towns of Frontignan and Mireval. He was the only son of William of Aumelas and of Tiburge, Countess of Orange, daughter of Raimbaut, Count of Orange. After the early death of his father, Raimbaut's guardians were his uncle William VII of Montpellier and his elder sister Tibors.

Raimbaut contributed to the creation of trobar ric, or articulate style, in troubadour poetry. About forty of his works survive, displaying a gusto for rare rhymes and intricate poetic form.

His death in 1173 is mourned in a planh (lament) by Giraut de Bornelh, and also in the only surviving poem of the trobairitz Azalais de Porcairagues, who was the lover of Raimbaut's cousin Gui Guerrejat. It seems possible that Azalais' poem was composed in an earlier form while Raimbaut was still alive, because in his poem A mon vers dirai chanso he appears to contribute to the poetical debate begun by Guilhem de Saint-Leidier and taken up by Azalais as to whether a lady is dishonoured by taking a lover who is richer than herself. Aimo Sakari argues that Azalais is the mysterious joglar (jongleur) addressed in several poems by Raimbaut.

== Bibliography ==
- Pattison, Walter T. The Life and Works of the Troubadour Raimbaut d'Orange. Minneapolis: University of Minnesota Press, 1952. LCCN 52-5321.
- Sakari, A. "Azalais de Porcairagues, le 'Joglar' de Raimbaut d'Orange" in Neuphilologische Mitteilungen, vol. 50 (1949) pp. 23–43, 56-87, 174-198.
