= Barral of Baux =

Provençal nobleman

- Died: 1268
- Spouse: Sibylle d'Anduze

Barral of Baux (died 1268) was Viscount of Marseille and Lord of Baux. He was the son of Hugh III of Baux, Viscount of Marseille, and Barrale.

== Career ==
Barral came to oppose the Albigensian Crusade, and invaded the Comtat Venaissin in 1234 in support of Raymond VII of Toulouse.

In 1239, Barral entered negotiations to have his daughter Cecile marry Guigues VII, Dauphin of Viennois, another supporter of Toulouse. Under pressure from Philip of Savoy, Barral reneged on the engagement, saying he had only agreed to it in fear of his life. In 1244, Barral helped arbitrate the latest conflict between Savoy and Provence on one side and the dauphin and Aymar III of Valentinois on the other. In December of that year, Cecile married the Count of Savoy, firmly pulling Baux into the Savoy alliances.

In 1246, Barral joined his son-in-law and family in bringing an army to the rescue of Beatrice of Savoy and her daughter Beatrice of Provence, who had recently inherited the county of Provence. They had been besieged by others seeking to marry her, but the family was able to safely escort her to her wedding. The countess's new husband did not respect her father's will toward the rest of the family, so Barral joined the Provençal rebellion against Charles of Anjou in 1247, supporting his son-in-law's family in their rights. Forced to surrender to Charles in June 1251, he became a supporter of Charles by October, and helped suppress the rebellion in 1262.

In 1255, Barral was again called on to mediate the disputes between Philip of Savoy and the Valentinois-Viennois alliance.

For his support of Charles, he was made Grand Justiciar of Sicily, and died in 1268. He was succeeded as Lord of Baux by his son Bertran.

== Marriage and children ==
He married Sibylle d'Anduze (died after 9 June 1279), the daughter of Constance of Toulouse and Pierre Bermond, seigneur d'Anduze. Barral and Sibylle had five children:

1. Hugh (died c. 1251)
2. Bertrand II of Baux (died 1304 or 1305), Count of Avellino and Lord of Baux
3. Marquise (died c. 1279), married Henry II, Count of Rodez
4. Cecile, called "Passerose" (died 1275), married 1244 Amadeus IV, Count of Savoy
5. Marguerite
