= William I of Baux =

12th-century Provençal nobleman and troubadour

William I of Baux (Occitan: Guilhèm dei Bauç, archaic Guillem or Guilhem dels Baus, French: Guillaume des Baux or du Baus, Latin: Guillelmus de Balcio; c. 1155 – June 1218) was the Prince of Orange from 1182 until his death. He was an important Provençal nobleman in the Kingdom of Arles in the Holy Roman Empire.

William was the son of Bertrand I of Baux, the first Prince of Orange and a major patron of Occitan poetry, and Tibors de Sarenom, a sister of Raimbaut d'Aurenga and herself a trobairitz. In 1215 when the Emperor Frederick II sought to make his power effective in the Kingdom of Burgundy, he granted to William at Metz the whole "Kingdom of Arles and Vienne", probably referring to the viceroyalty of the kingdom. William was imprisoned in Avignon in the summer of 1216 and remained there until his death in June 1218. William's descendants continued to claim the Kingdom of Arles until 1393.

William was a man of letters and a troubadour, inheriting his love of lyric poetry from his patron-composer parents. Two coblas and a sirventes are preserved from William's writings. He was also in contact with other troubadours. The lone surviving sirventes of Gui de Cavalhon was written against William.

An anecdotal razo is preserved describing how William robbed a French merchant, who subsequently took his case to the king, Philip Augustus, but was rejected because "it had taken place too far away" (i.e. out of French jurisdiction in Provence). The merchant subsequently counterfeited the royal seal and used it to lure William to his (unnamed) city with promises of rewards. When William and his companions arrived in the city the merchant had them arrested and imprisoned until he had made amends for what he had taken. On his return to Provence, William allegedly planned to annex a piece of land ("la Osteilla" or "Estella") belonging to Ademar II of Valentinois when he was captured by Ademar's fisherman in a small boat on the Rhône. This event inspired a cobla from the troubadour Raimbaut de Vaqueiras, who nicknamed William Engles ("the Englishman", for unknown reasons).

William married Ermengarde, daughter of Raymond of Mévouillon, but divorced her on 21 March 1203. Their child, Raymond I of Baux, succeeded his father as Prince of Orange and King of Arles. William later remarried to a woman named Alix. His sons by her, William II and Bertrand II, both later inherited Orange. William also had a daughter named Tibors who married Giraud III Amic, lord of Thor de Châteauneuf.

== Sources ==
- Aurell, Martin. La vielle et l'épée: Troubadours et politique en Provence au XIII^{e} siècle. Aubier, 1989.
- Cook, Theodore Andrea. Old Provence. Signal Books, 2001. ISBN 1-902669-18-5.
- Egan, Margarita, ed. The Vidas of the Troubadours. New York: Garland, 1984. ISBN 0-8240-9437-9.
- Guida, Saverio. "Per la biografia di Gui de Cavaillon e di Bertran Folco d'Avignon." Cultura neolatina, 32 (1972), pp. 189–210.
