= List of princes and princesses of Orange =

Princes/Princesses of Oranges

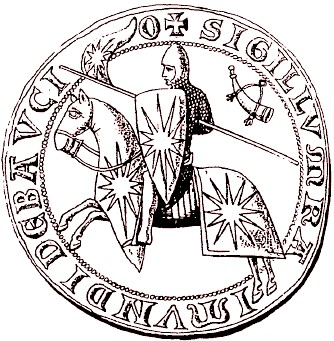
Bertrand I of Baux was the first sovereign Prince of Orange.

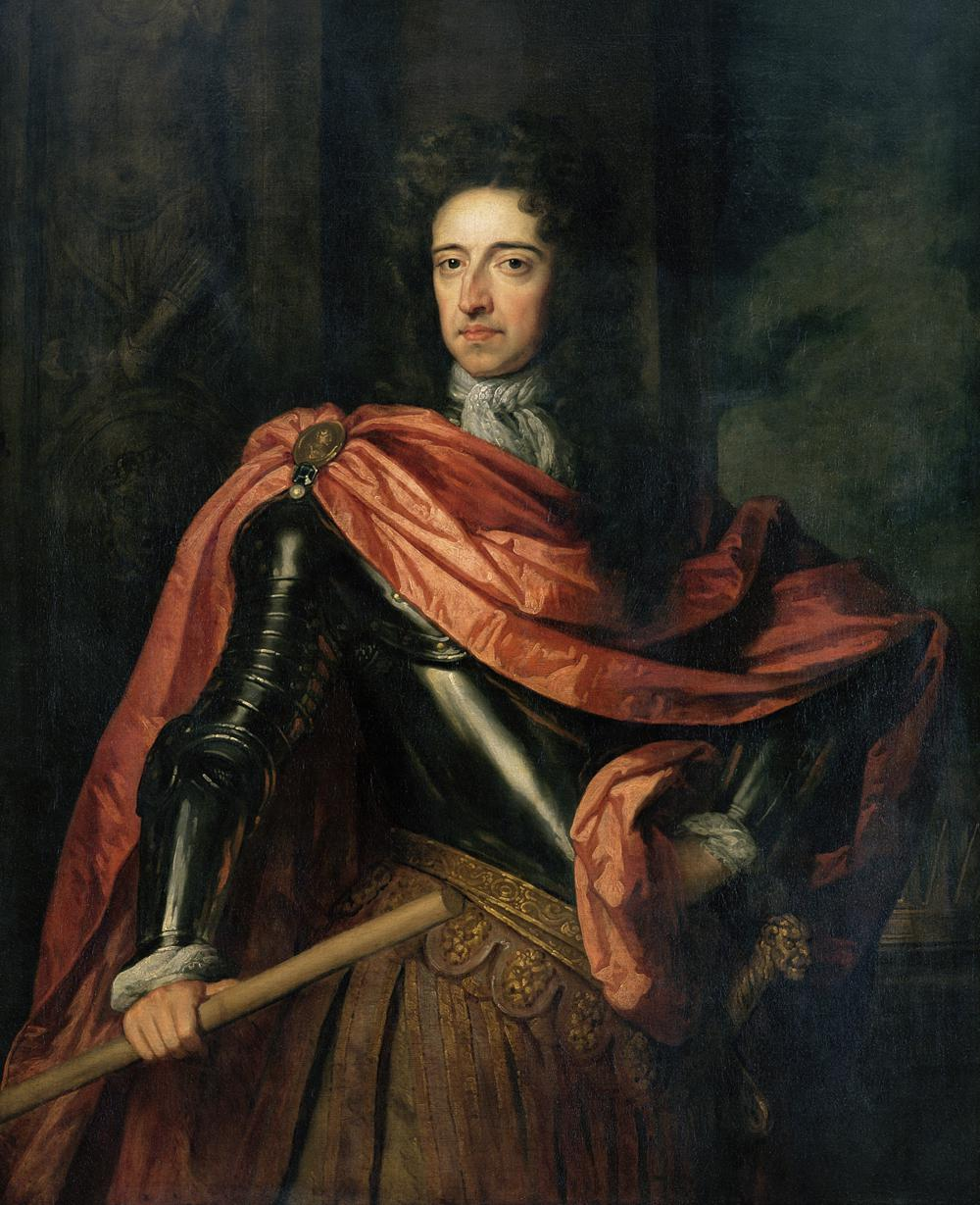
William III was the last ruling Prince and had the longest reign at 51 years.

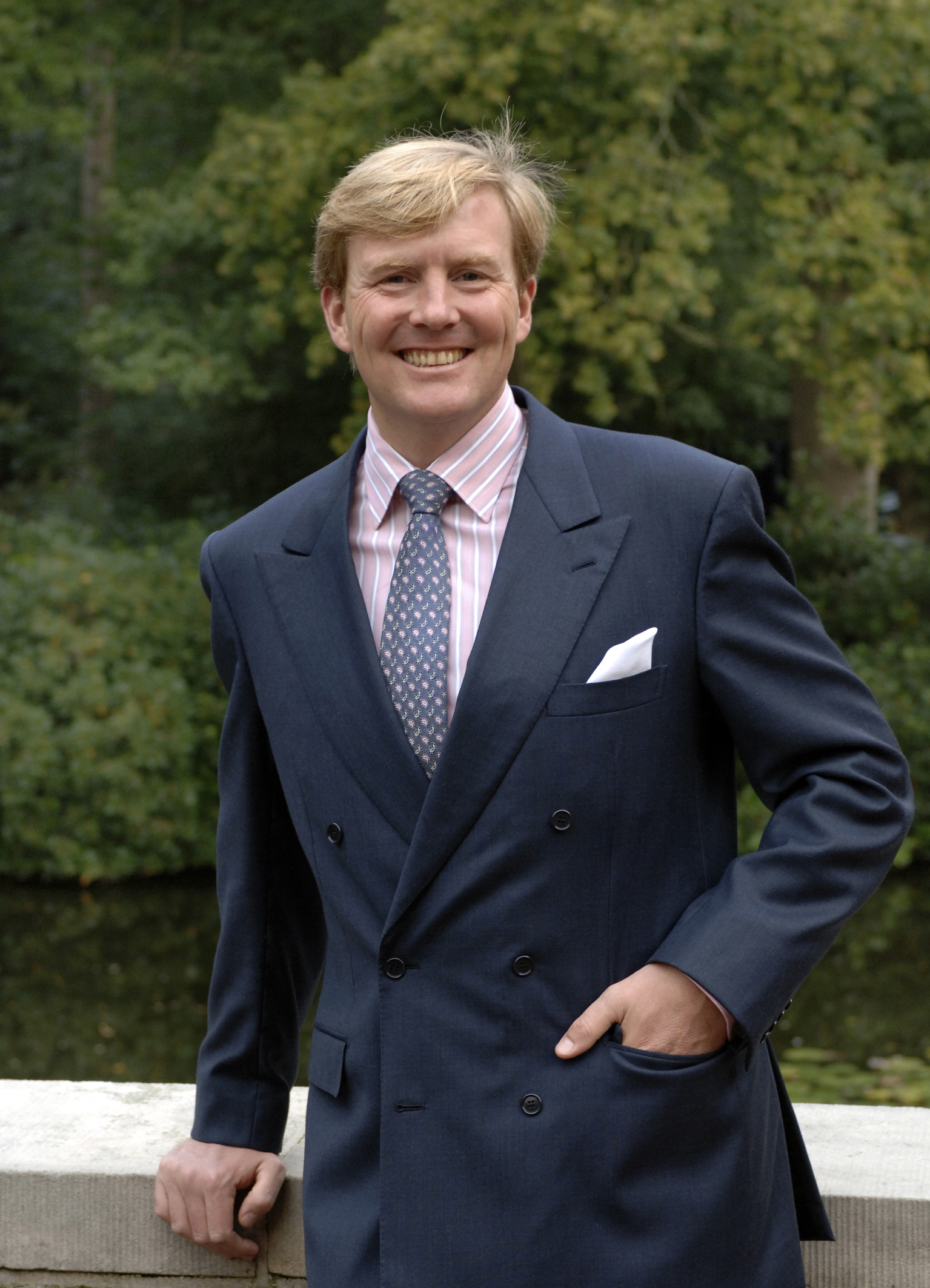
Willem-Alexander had the longest tenure as the Dutch heir apparent at 33 years.

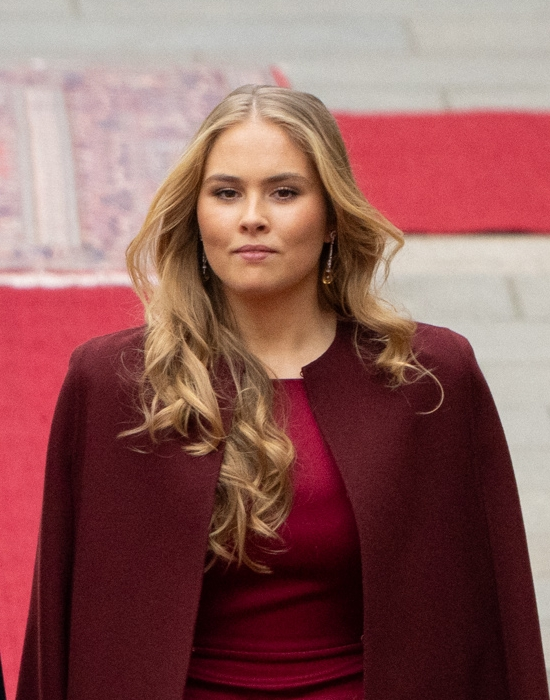
Catharina-Amalia is the current Princess of Orange.

The title Prince of Orange was initially used upon the rulers of the Principality of Orange. Following the principality's dissolution and absorption by France, the title continued being used by members of the House of Orange-Nassau, until the formation of an independent Kingdom of the Netherlands. Since the kingdom's formation, the title of Prince of Orange is bestowed upon the Dutch heir apparent. The current holder of the title is Catharina-Amalia, eldest daughter of King Willem-Alexander.

When the Kingdom of the Netherlands was formed in 1815, the monarchy initially followed Salic law.

In 1983, the Constitution of the Netherlands was amended to ensure absolute primogeniture, meaning that the sovereign is to be succeeded by their eldest child, regardless of sex.

== Principality of Orange ==
Until 1340, it was customary for all sons of the prince of Orange to inherit the title. Only the direct line of descent to Raimond V is shown here.

=== House of Baux ===
The house of Baux succeeded to the principality of Orange when Bertrand of Baux married the heiress of the last native count of Orange, Tiburge, daughter of William of Orange, Omelaz, and Montpellier. Their son was William I of Baux-Orange. Bertrand was the son of Raymond of Baux and Stephanie of Gevaudan. Stephanie was the younger daughter of Gerberga, the heiress of the counts of Provence. For a genealogical table, see the reference cited:

No	Name	Picture	Arms	Birth	Created Prince of Orange	Ceased to be Prince of Orange	Death	Other titles while Prince of Orange	Princess of Orange
1.	Prince Bertrand I			1110/1115	1173; After the death of his brother-in-law, Raimbaut, Count of Orange, the County of Orange was elevated to a principality in 1163 by the Holy Roman Emperor Frederick I.	April/October 1180		Lord of Baux	Tibors de Sarenom

Bertrand I used as Prince of Orange the coat of arms of the House of Baux: a 16-pointed white star placed on a field of gules. Later on, the Princes of Orange quartered the legendary bugle-horn as a heraldic figure into their coat of arms.

=== House of Baux-Orange ===
No	Name	Arms	Birth	Became Prince of Orange	Ceased to be Prince of Orange	Death	Other titles while Prince of Orange	Princess of Orange
2.	Prince William I		1155	31 October 1180	bef. 30 July 1218		Co-Prince (with brothers); Lord of Baux	1. Ermengarde of Mévouillon; 2. Alix
3.	Prince William II		–	31 October 1180	bef. 1 November 1239		Co-Prince (with his brother); Lord of Baux	Précieuse
4.	Prince William III		–	aft. 1 November 1239	1257		Co-Prince (with his uncle); Lord of Baux	Giburg
5.	Prince Raymond I		–	bef. 30 July 1218	1282		Co-Prince (with his brother and nephew) Lord of Baux	Malberjone of Aix
6.	Prince Bertrand IV		–	1282	aft. 21 July 1314		Lord of Baux	Eleanore of Geneva
7.	Prince Raymond IV		–	aft. 21 July 1314	1340, aft. 9 September		Lord of Baux and Condorcet	Anne of Viennois
8.	Prince Raymond V		–	aft. 9 September 1340	10 February 1393		Lord of Baux	1. Constance of Trian; 2. Jeanne of Geneva
9.	Princess Mary		–	10 February 1393	October 1417		Lady of Arlay, Cuiseaux, and Vitteaux	Prince John I

=== House of Chalon-Orange (also House of Ivrea of Anscarid dynasty) ===
The lords of Chalons and Arlay were a cadet branch of the ruling house of the county of Burgundy, the Anscarids or House of Ivrea. They married the heiress of Baux-Orange.

No	Name	Picture	Arms	Birth	Became Prince of Orange	Ceased to be Prince of Orange	Death	Other titles while Prince of Orange	Princess of Orange
10.	Prince John I	none		–	10 February 1393	October 1417	2 September 1418	Lord of Arlay, Cuiseaux and Vitteaux	Princess Mary
11.	Prince Louis I	none		1390	October 1417	3 December 1463		Lord of Arlay, Arguel, Orbe, and Echelens	1. Jeanne of Montbéliard; 2. Eleanor d'Armagnac; 3. Blanche of Gamaches
12.	Prince William II	none		–	3 December 1463	27 September 1475		Lord of Arlay and Arguel	Catherine of Brittany
13.	Prince John II	none		1443	27 September 1475	15 April 1502		Count of Tonnerre; Lord of Arlay, Arguel and Montfaucon; Admiral of Guyenne	1. Jeanne de Bourbon; 2. Philiberte of Luxembourg
14.	Prince Philibert			18 March 1502	15 April 1502	3 August 1530		Viceroy of Naples; Prince of Melfi; Duke of Gravina; Count of Tonnerre, Charny, Penthièvre; Viscount of Besançon; Lord of Arlay, Nozeroy, Rougemont, Orgelet and Montfaucon, Lieutenant-General in the Imperial army.	no wife

=== House of Chalon-Orange ===
Rene inherited the principality of Orange from his uncle Philbert on the condition that he bear the name and arms of the house of Chalon-Orange. Therefore, he is usually counted as one of the Chalon-Orange and history knows him as Rene of Chalon, rather than "of Nassau".

No	Name	Picture	Arms	Birth	Became Prince of Orange	Ceased to be Prince of Orange	Death	Other titles while Prince of Orange	Princess of Orange
15.	Prince René			5 February 1519	3 August 1530	15 July 1544		Stadtholder of Holland, Zeeland, Utrecht and Guelders; Count of Nassau, and Vianden; Viscount of Antwerp; Baron of Breda, Diest, Herstal, Warneton, Beilstein, Arlay, and Nozeroy; Lord of Dasburg, Geertruidenberg, Hooge en Lage Zwaluwe, Klundert, Montfort, Naaldwijk, Niervaart, Polanen, Steenbergen, Bütgenbach, Sankt Vith, and Besançon.	Anna of Lorraine

=== House of Orange-Nassau (first incarnation) ===
William of Nassau inherited the principality of Orange from his cousin René. Although William descended from no previous Prince of Orange, as René had no children or siblings, he exercised his right as sovereign prince to will Orange to his first cousin on his father's side, who actually had no Orange blood. This began the Dutch Royal House of Orange-Nassau.

No.	Name	Picture	Arms	Birth	Became Prince of Orange	Ceased to be Prince of Orange	Death	Other titles while Prince of Orange	Princess of Orange
16.	Prince William I (the Silent)			24 April 1533	15 July 1544	10 July 1584		Stadtholder of Holland, Zeeland, Utrecht and Friesland; Marquis of Veere and Vlissingen, Count of Nassau-Dillenburg, Katzenelnbogen, and Vianden; Viscount of Antwerp; Baron of Breda, Lands of Cuijk, City of Grave, Diest, Herstal, Warneton, Beilstein, Arlay, and Nozeroy; Lord of Dasburg, Geertruidenberg, Hooge en Lage Zwaluwe, Klundert, Montfort, Naaldwijk, Niervaart, Polanen, Steenbergen, Willemstad, Bütgenbach, Sankt Vith, and Besançon.	1. Anna van Egmont; 2. Anna of Saxony; 3. Charlotte de Bourbon; 4. Louise de Coligny
17.	Prince Philip William			19 December 1554	10 July 1584	20 February 1618		Count of Nassau-Dillenburg, Buren, Leerdam, Katzenelnbogen, and Vianden; Viscount of Antwerp; Baron of Breda, Cranendonck, Lands of Cuijk, Eindhoven, City of Grave, IJsselstein, Diest, Herstal, Warneton, Beilstein, Arlay, and Nozeroy; Lord of Dasburg, Geertruidenberg, Hooge en Lage Zwaluwe, Klundert, Montfort, Naaldwijk, Niervaart, Polanen, Steenbergen, Sint-Maartensdijk, Willemstad, Bütgenbach, Sankt Vith, and Besançon.	Éléonore de Bourbon
18.	Prince Maurice			14 November 1567	20 February 1618	23 April 1625		Stadtholder of Holland, Zeeland, Utrecht, Guelders, Overijssel and Groningen; Marquis of Veere and Vlissingen; Count of Nassau-Dillenburg, Buren, Leerdam, Katzenelnbogen, and Vianden; Viscount of Antwerp; Baron of Aggeris, Breda, Cranendonck, Lands of Cuijk, Daesburg, Eindhoven, City of Grave, Lek, IJsselstein, Diest, Grimbergen, Herstal, Warneton, Beilstein, Bentheim-Lingen, Moers, Arlay, and Nozeroy; Lord of Dasburg, Geertruidenberg, Hooge en Lage Zwaluwe, Klundert, Montfort, Naaldwijk, Niervaart, Polanen, Steenbergen, Sint-Maartensdijk, Willemstad, Bütgenbach, Sankt Vith, and Besançon.	no wife
19.	Prince Frederick Henry			29 January 1584	23 April 1625	14 March 1647		Stadtholder of Holland, Zeeland, Utrecht, Guelders, and Overijssel; Marquis of Veere and Vlissingen; Count of Nassau-Dillenburg, Buren, Leerdam, Katzenelnbogen, and Vianden; Viscount of Antwerp; Baron of Aggeris, Breda, Cranendonck, Lands of Cuijk, Daesburg, Eindhoven, City of Grave, Lek, IJsselstein, Diest, Grimbergen, Herstal, Warneton, Beilstein, Bentheim-Lingen, Moers, Arlay, and Nozeroy; Lord of Dasburg, Geertruidenberg, Hooge en Lage Zwaluwe, Klundert, Montfort, Naaldwijk, Niervaart, Polanen, Steenbergen, Sint-Maartensdijk, Willemstad, Bütgenbach, Sankt Vith, and Besançon.	Amalia of Solms-Braunfels
20.	Prince William II			27 May 1626	14 March 1647	6 November 1650		Stadtholder of Holland, Zeeland, Utrecht, Guelders and Overijssel; Marquis of Veere and Vlissingen; Count of Nassau-Dillenburg, Buren, Leerdam, Katzenelnbogen, and Vianden; Viscount of Antwerp; Baron of Aggeris, Breda, Cranendonck, Lands of Cuijk, Daesburg, Eindhoven, City of Grave, Lek, IJsselstein, Diest, Grimbergen, Herstal, Warneton, Beilstein, Bentheim-Lingen, Moers, Arlay, and Nozeroy; Lord of Dasburg, Geertruidenberg, Hooge en Lage Zwaluwe, Klundert, Montfort, Naaldwijk, Niervaart, Polanen, Steenbergen, Sint-Maartensdijk, Turnhout, Willemstad, Zevenbergen, Bütgenbach, Sankt Vith, and Besançon.	Mary, Princess Royal
21.	William III			14 November 1650	14 November 1650	8 March 1702		King of England, Scotland, and Ireland, Stadtholder of Holland, Zeeland, Utrecht, Guelders, and Overijssel; Marquis of Veere and Vlissingen; Count of Nassau-Dillenburg, Buren, Leerdam, Katzenelnbogen, and Vianden; Viscount of Antwerp; Baron of Aggeris, Breda, Cranendonck, Lands of Cuijk, Daesburg, Eindhoven, City of Grave, Lek, IJsselstein, Diest, Grimbergen, Herstal, Warneton, Beilstein, Bentheim-Lingen, Moers, Arlay, and Nozeroy; Lord of Baarn, Bredevoort, Dasburg, Geertruidenberg, Hooge en Lage Zwaluwe, Klundert, 't Loo, Montfort, Naaldwijk, Niervaart, Polanen, Steenbergen, Sint-Maartensdijk, Soest, Ter Eem, Turnhout, Willemstad, Zevenbergen, Bütgenbach, Sankt Vith, and Besançon.	Queen Mary II of England

=== Titular princes of Orange ===
No.	Name	Picture	Arms	Birth	Became Prince of Orange	Ceased to be Prince of Orange	Death
1	John William Friso; Johan Willem Friso			14 August 1687	8 March 1702	14 July 1711	
2	William IV; Willem Karel Hendrik Friso			1 September 1711	14 July 1711	22 October 1751	
3	William V Willem Batavus			8 March 1748	22 October 1751	9 April 1806	
4	William VI; Willem Frederik			24 August 1772	9 April 1806	16 March 1815	7 October 1840

== Monarchy of the Netherlands ==
=== Heirs apparent ===
Portrait	Name	Tenure	Life details	Monarch	Ref.
	William (II) Willem Frederik George Lodewijk	16 March 1815 – 7 October 1840 (25 years, 6 months and 21 days)	6 December 1792 – 17 March 1849 (aged 56) XXX	William I	
	William (III) Willem Alexander Paul Frederik Lodewijk	7 October 1840 – 17 March 1849 (8 years, 5 months and 10 days)	19 February 1817 – 23 November 1890 (aged 73) XXX	William II	
	William Willem Nicolaas Alexander Frederik Karel Hendrik	17 March 1849 – 11 June 1879 (30 years, 2 months and 25 days)	4 September 1840 – 11 June 1879 (aged 38) XXX	William III	
	Alexander Willem Alexander Karel Hendrik Frederik	11 June 1879 – 21 June 1884 (5 years and 10 days)	25 August 1851 – 21 June 1884 (aged 32) XXX	William III	
	Willem-Alexander Willem-Alexander Claus George Ferdinand	30 April 1980 – 30 April 2013 (33 years)	27 April 1967 (age 58) Eldest son of Queen Beatrix and Prince Claus, Willem-Alexander alexander became heir apparent following his mother's ascent to the throne. Following Beatrix's abdication, he assumed the position of King.	Beatrix	
	Catharina-Amalia Catharina-Amalia Beatrix Carmen Victoria	30 April 2013 – present (13 years, 6 months and 7 days)	7 December 2003 (age 22) Eldest daughter of King Willem-Alexander and Queen Máxima, Catharine-Amalia assumed the title Princess of Orange upon her father's ascent to the throne. A 1983 constitutional change altered the succession law to follow absolute primogeniture, ensuring the eldest child would be the heir apparent even if female.	Willem-Alexander	
