= Frederick Henry, Prince of Orange =

Prince of Orange and Stadtholder of Holland (1584–1647)

Frederick Henry
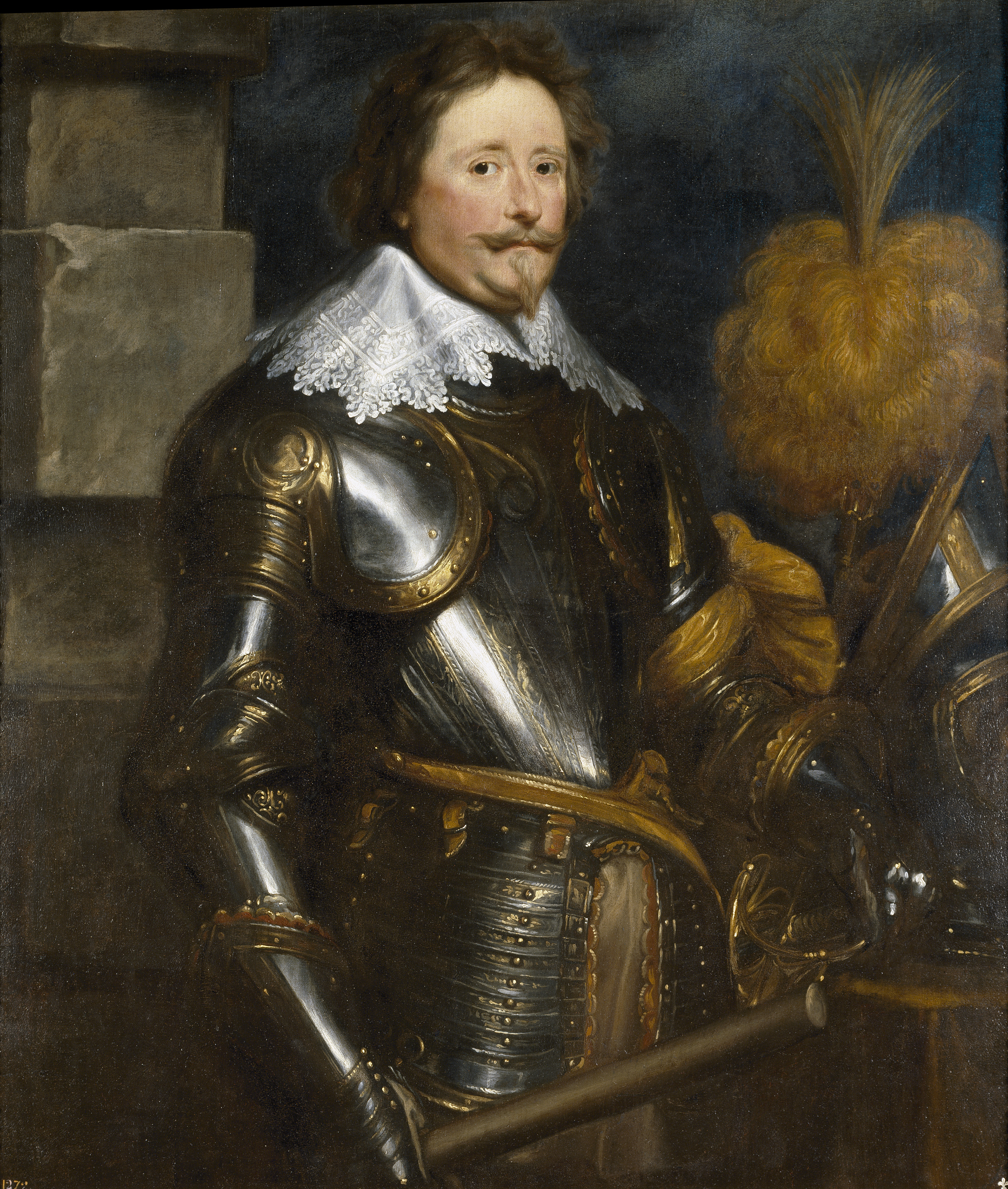
- Portrait by Anthony van Dyck, c. 1629

Prince of Orange and Stadtholder of Holland, Zeeland, Utrecht, Guelders, and Overijssel
- Reign: 23 April 1625 - 14 March 1647
- Predecessor: Maurice
- Successor: William II
- Born: 29 January 1584; Delft, Dutch Republic
- Died: 14 March 1647 (aged 63); The Hague, Dutch Republic
- Spouse: Amalia of Solms-Braunfels (m. 1625)
- Issue: William II, Prince of Orange; Louise Henriette, Duchess of Prussia; Henriette Amalia of Nassau; Elisabeth of Nassau; Isabella Charlotte of Nassau; Albertine Agnes of Nassau; Henriette Catherine, Princess of Anhalt-Dessau; Henry Louis of Nassau; Maria, Countess Palatine of Simmern-Kaiserslautern
- House: Orange-Nassau
- Father: William the Silent
- Mother: Louise de Coligny
- Religion: Dutch Reformed

Frederick Henry (Dutch: Frederik Hendrik; 29 January 1584 – 14 March 1647) was the sovereign prince of Orange and stadtholder of Holland, Zeeland, Utrecht, Guelders, and Overijssel in the Dutch Republic from his older half-brother's death on 23 April 1625 until his death on 14 March 1647. In the last seven years of his life, he was also the stadtholder of Groningen (1640-1647).

As the leading soldier in the Dutch wars against Spain, his main achievement was the successful Siege of 's-Hertogenbosch in 1629. It was the main Spanish base and a well-fortified city protected by an experienced Spanish garrison and by formidable water defenses. His strategy was the successful neutralization of the threat of inundation of the area around 's-Hertogenbosch and his capture of the Spanish storehouse at Wesel. The successful sieges under his command earned him the epithet ‘city forcer’ (Dutch: stedendwinger). He was the paternal grandfather of William III, who later became King of England, Scotland & Ireland, through his only surviving son, William II.

== Biography ==
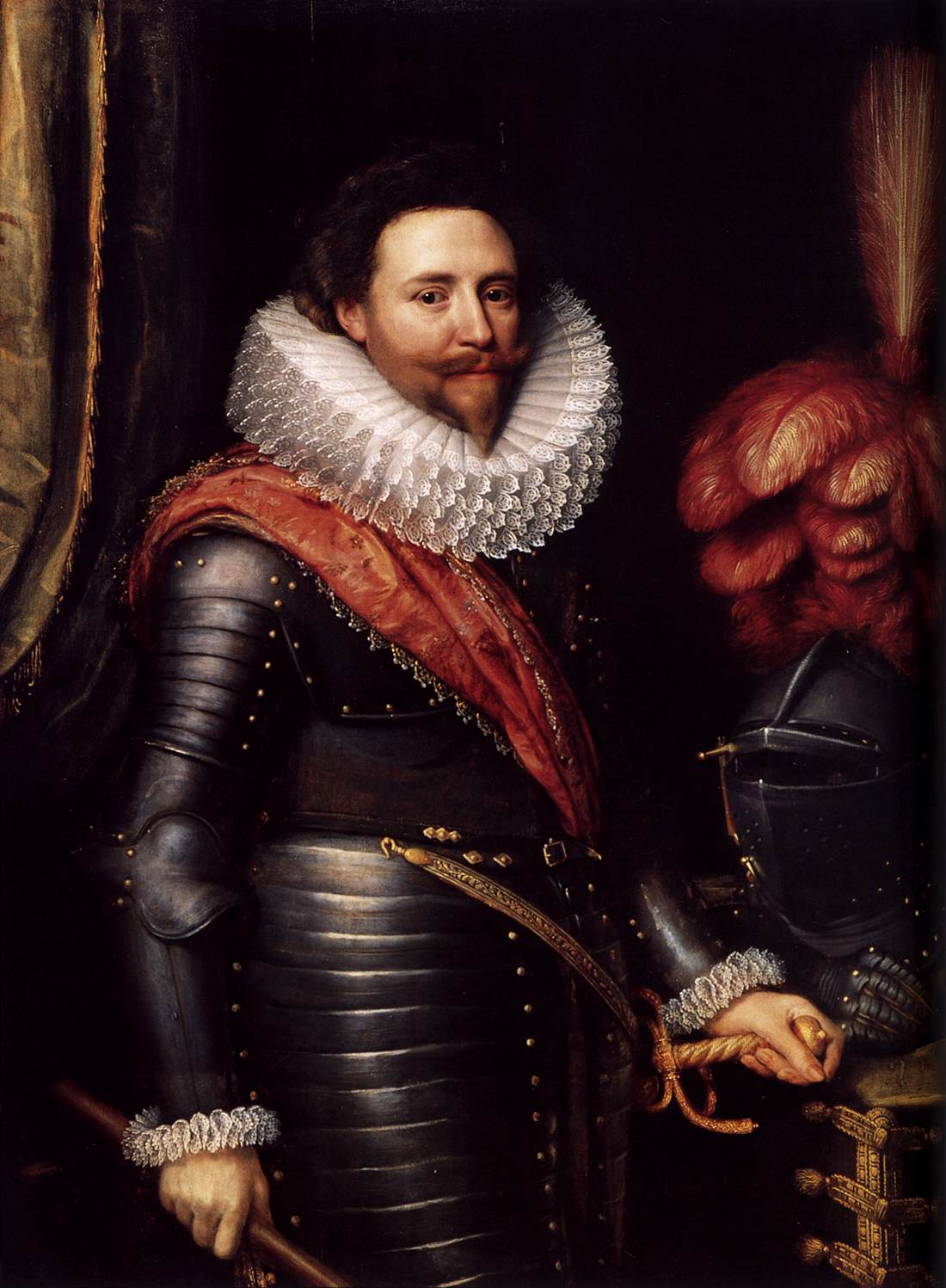
Portrait of Prince Frederick Henry by Michiel Janszoon van Mierevelt, painted c. 1620–1624

=== Early life ===
Frederick Henry was born on 29 January 1584 in Delft, Holland, Dutch Republic. He was the youngest child of William the Silent and Louise de Coligny. His father William was stadtholder of Holland, Zeeland, Utrecht, and Friesland. His mother Louise was daughter of the Huguenot leader Gaspard de Coligny, and was the fourth wife of his father. He was thus the half brother of his predecessor Maurice of Orange, deceased in 1625.

Frederick Henry was born six months before his father's assassination on 10 July 1584. The boy was trained to arms by his elder brother Maurice, one of the finest generals of his age. After Maurice threatened to legitimize his illegitimate children if he did not marry, Frederick Henry married his first cousin once removed, Countess Amalia of Solms-Braunfels in 1625. His illegitimate son by Margaretha Catharina Bruyns (1595–1625), Frederick Nassau de Zuylestein was born in 1624 before his marriage and became the governor of the young William III of England for seven years.

=== Stadtholder ===
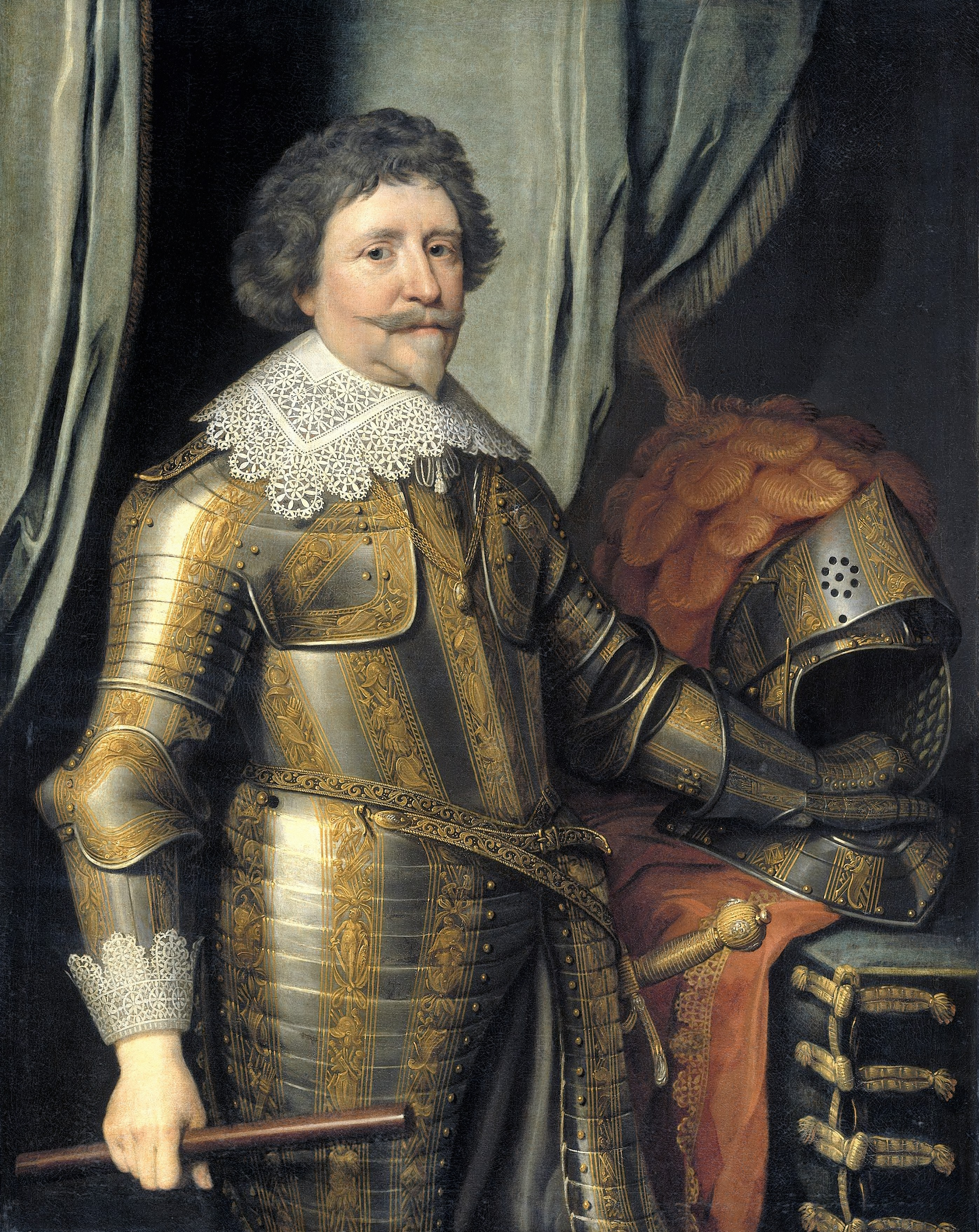
Portrait by Michiel Janszoon van Mierevelt, 1632

On the death of Maurice in 1625 without legitimate issue, Frederick Henry succeeded him in his paternal dignities and estates, and also in the stadtholderates of the five provinces of Holland, Zeeland, Utrecht, Overijssel and Guelders, and in the important posts of captain and admiral-general of the Union (commander-in-chief of the Dutch States Army and of the Dutch navy).

Frederick Henry proved himself as a general, capable statesman, and politician. For twenty-two years, he remained at the head of government in the United Provinces, and in his time the power of the stadtholderate reached its peak. The "Period of Frederick Henry," as it is usually styled by Dutch writers, is generally accounted for the golden age of the republic. It was marked by military triumphs, worldwide maritime and commercial expansion, and by an outburst of activity in art and literature.

The chief military exploits of Frederick Henry were the sieges and captures of Grol in 1627, 's-Hertogenbosch in 1629, of Maastricht in 1632, of Breda in 1637, of Sas van Gent in 1644, and of Hulst in 1645. His chief opponent during the later 1640s was Andries Bicker, leader of the "Bickerse ligue", burgomaster of Amsterdam and powerful member of the States General, who was looking for peace with Spain, wanted to reduce the army and preferred Amsterdam's trading power.

During the greater part of his administration the alliance with France against Spain had been the pivot of Frederick Henry's foreign policy, but in his last years he sacrificed the French alliance for the sake of concluding a separate peace with Spain, by which the United Provinces obtained from that power all the advantages they had been seeking for eighty years.

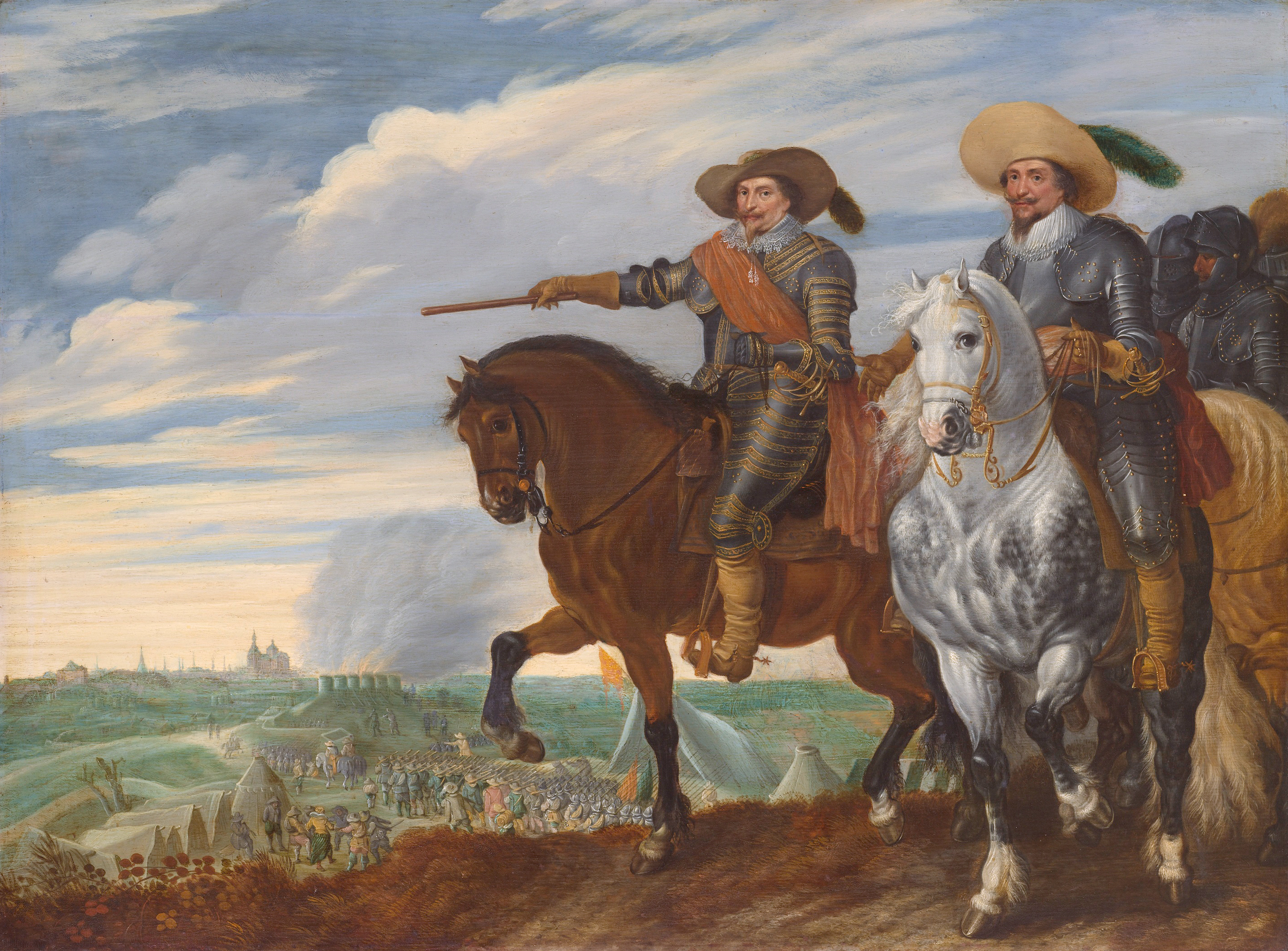
Frederick Henry and Ernst Casimir at the siege of 's-Hertogenbosch, 1629

Frederick Henry built the country houses Huis Honselaarsdijk, Huis ter Nieuwburg, and for his wife Huis ten Bosch, and he renovated the Noordeinde Palace in The Hague. Huis Honselaarsdijk and Huis ter Nieuwburg are now demolished.

=== Death ===
Frederick Henry died on 14 March 1647 in The Hague, Holland, Dutch Republic. He left his wife Amalia of Solms-Braunfels, his son William II, Prince of Orange, four of his daughters, and his illegitimate son Frederick Nassau de Zuylestein.

On Frederick Henry's death, he was buried with great pomp beside his father and brother at Delft. The treaty of Munster, ending the long struggle between the Dutch and the Spaniards, was not actually signed until 30 January 1648, the illness and death of the stadtholder having caused a delay in the negotiations. Frederick Henry left an account of his campaigns in his Mémoires de Frédéric Henri (Amsterdam, 1743). See Cambridge Mod. Hist. vol. iv. chap. 24.

His widow commissioned an elaborate mausoleum in the Oranjezaal, a panoramic painted ballroom with scenes from his life and allegories of good government based on his achievements.

== Children ==
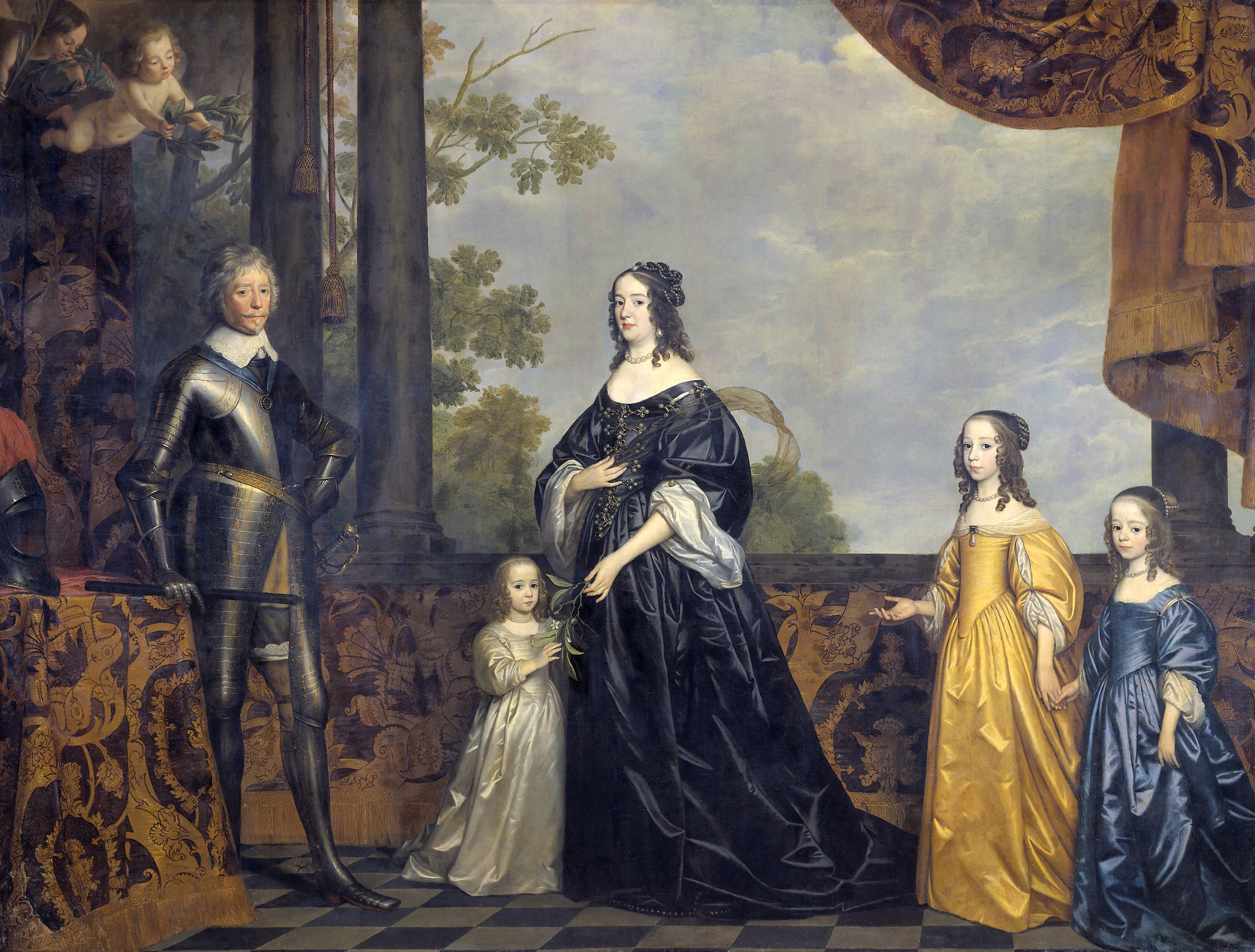
Frederick Henry and his family, by Gerard van Honthorst

Frederick Henry and his wife Amalia of Solms-Braunfels had nine children, seven daughters and two sons. Four of their children, including one son, died in childhood, leaving Frederick Henry with only a single son as heir. Ultimately, after the death of Frederick Henry's only male-line grandson, the stadtholdership was to pass to a distant agnatic cousin, who was married to Frederick Henry's daughter Albertine Agnes. Frederick Henry's children were:

- William II, Prince of Orange (27 May 1626 – 6 November 1650)
- Luise Henriette of Nassau (27 December 1627 – 18 June 1667)
- Henriëtte Amalia of Nassau (26 October 1628 – 2 December 1628) died in infancy.
- Elisabeth of Nassau (4 August 1630) died at birth.
- Isabella Charlotte of Nassau (28 April 1632 – 17 May 1642) died young at age 10.
- Albertine Agnes of Nassau (9 April 1634 – 24 May 1696)
- Henriette Catherine of Nassau (10 February 1637 – 3 November 1708)
- Hendrik Lodewijk of Nassau (30 November 1639 – 19 December 1639) died in infancy.
- Maria of Nassau (5 September 1642 – 17/20 March 1688)

Frederick Henry recognized one illegitimate child by Margaretha Catharina Bruyns:

- Frederick Nassau, lord of Zuylestein (1624–1672)

== Coat of arms and titles ==
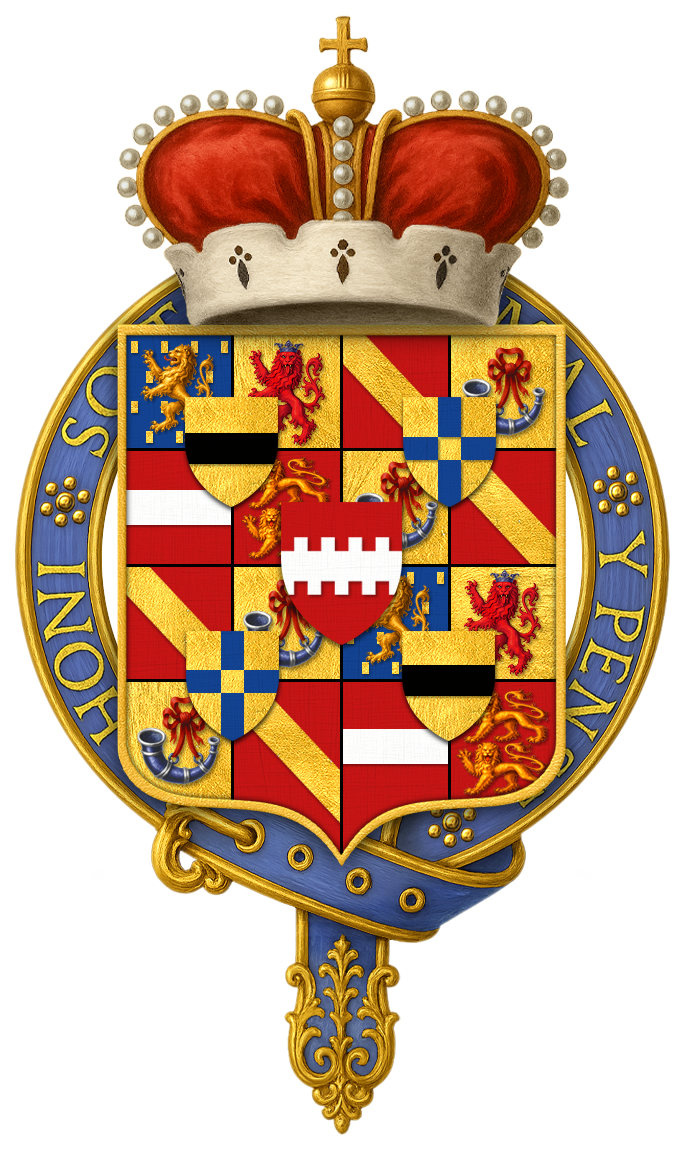
Gartered arms of Frederick Henry, Prince of Orange

1Arms of Frederick Henry used as Prince of Orange

Frederick Henry, besides being Stadholder of several provinces and Captain-General, both non-hereditary and appointive titles:

Stadtholder of Holland, Zeeland, Utrecht, Guelders, and Overijssel;

he was the hereditary sovereign of the principality of Orange in what is today Provence in France. He also was the lord of many other estates, which formed his wealth:

- Marquis of Veere and Vlissingen;
- Count of Nassau-Dillenburg, Buren, Leerdam, Katzenelnbogen, and Vianden;
- Viscount of Antwerp;
- Baron of Aggeris, Breda, Cranendonck, Lands of Cuijk, Daesburg, Eindhoven, City of Grave, Lek, IJsselstein, *Diest, Grimbergen, Herstal, Warneton, Beilstein, Bentheim-Lingen, Moers, Arlay, and Nozeroy;
- Lord of Dasburg, Geertruidenberg, Hooge en Lage Zwaluwe, Klundert, Montfort, Naaldwijk, Niervaart, Polanen, Steenbergen, Sint-Maartensdijk, Willemstad, Bütgenbach, Sankt Vith, and Besançon.

== List of military battles ==
Frederick Henry participated in these battles as principal Dutch commander:

- 5th Groenlo
- 's-Hertogenbosch
- Bruges
- 3rd Maastricht
- Leuven
- Schenkenschans
- 4th Breda
- Kallo
- 2nd Hulst
- 3rd Hulst
- 4th Hulst

== See also ==
- Fort Frederik Hendrik

Frederick Henry, Prince of Orange House of Orange-Nassau Cadet branch of the House of Nassau Born: 29 January 1584 Died: 14 March 1647
Regnal titles
Preceded by Maurice	Prince of Orange; Baron of Breda; 1625–1647	Succeeded by William II
Political offices
Preceded by Maurice of Nassau	Stadtholder of Holland, Zeeland, Utrecht, Guelders and Overijssel; 1625–1647	Succeeded by William II
