= Maps of the lands of the House of Orange =

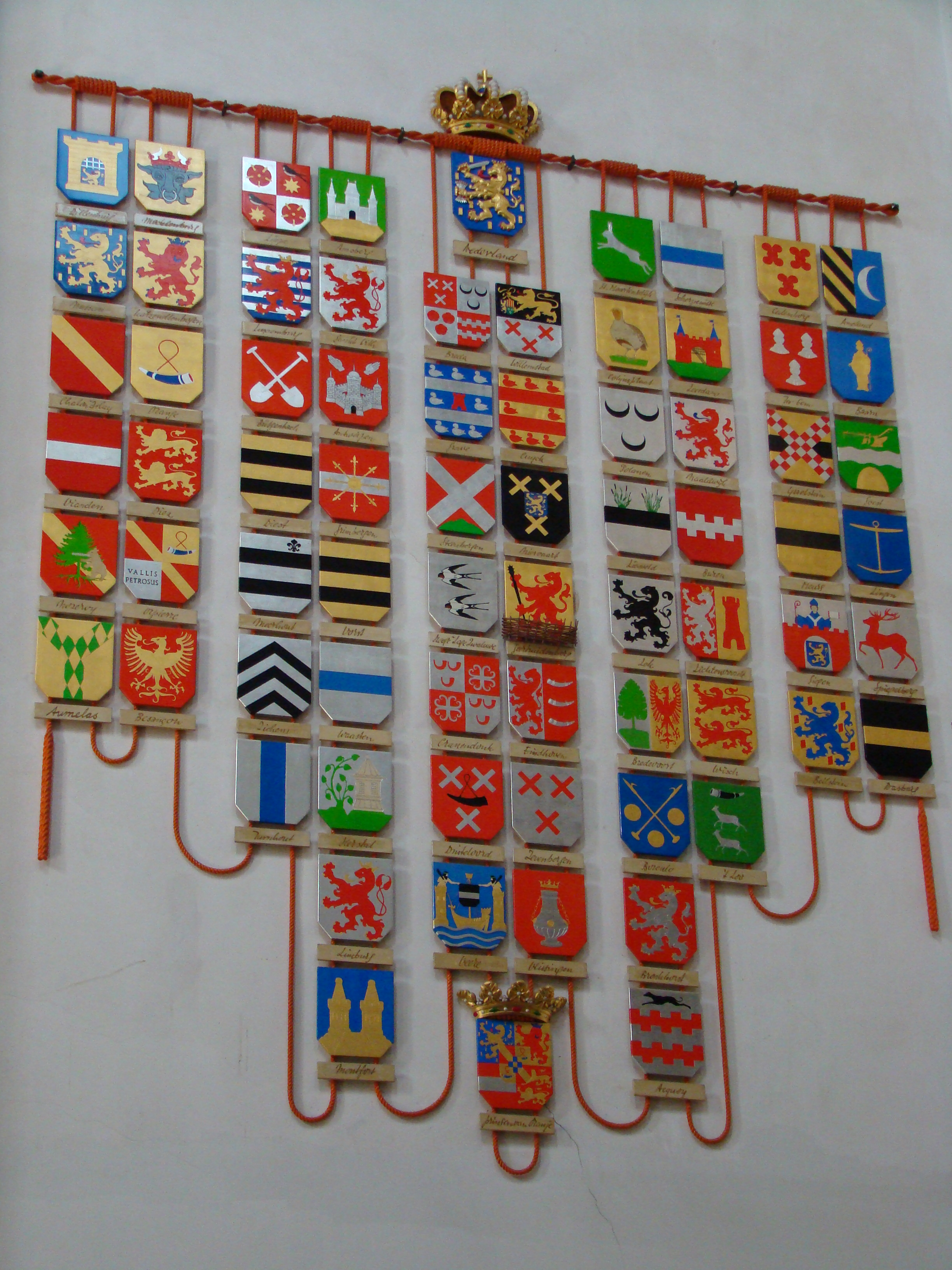
Coats of arms corresponding to the titles borne by various Dutch monarchs, including Veere and Flushing (right above the bottom crowned arms), displayed at Nieuwe Kerk in Amsterdam

Besides being sovereign over the principality of Orange, this is a partial listing of larger estates and titles that William the Silent and his heirs possessed, most enfeoffed to some other sovereign, either the King of France, the Habsburgs, or the States of the provinces of the Netherlands

Style of the Dutch sovereign:

- Marquis of Veere and Vlissingen
- Count of Nassau-Dillenburg
- Katzenelnbogen,

Dietz, Vianden, Buren, Moers, Leerdam , and Culemborg (1748)

- Viscount of Antwerp
- Baron of Breda,

Cranendonck, Lands of Cuijk, Eindhoven, City of Grave, Lek, IJsselstein, Acquoy, Diest, Grimbergen /, Herstal, Warneton (Waasten (nl)), Beilstein, Bentheim-Lingen, Arlay, Nozeroy, and Orpierre;

- Lord of Baarn, Soest, & Ter Eem,

Bredevoort, Dasburg, Geertruidenberg, Hooge en Lage Zwaluwe, Klundert, 't Loo, Montfort, Naaldwijk, Niervaart, Polanen/lands of Polanen, Steenbergen , Sint-Maartensdijk, Turnhout & Zevenbergen, Willemstad, Bütgenbach, Sankt Vith, and Besançon

== Maps of lands ==
=== Sovereign titles ===
==== King of the Netherlands ====
| Name | Timespan | Map | Coat of Arms | Historic Map |
|---|---|---|---|---|
| King of the Netherlands Koning der Nederlanden | 1815–present -The monarch of the Netherlands is constitutionally always considered "king" to ensure the powers are continuous. | Amsterdam (Capital & largest city) (Netherlands) | Royal Arms since 1907 | The constituent parts of the Kingdom of the Netherlands. |

==== Principality of Orange ====
The original main title was taken from the Principality of Orange on the Rhone River outside Avignon and the papal lands of the Comtat Venaissin. The principality was 108 sq mi (280 km2). However, the prince was a sovereign monarch, which put him on the same plane as the kings and monarchs of Europe and the world. This is much the same situation as Monaco today.

| Name | Timespan | Map | Coat of Arms | Historic Map |
|---|---|---|---|---|
| Prince of Orange Prince d'Orange | 793?/885 – 1713 titular 1713–present – Founded by First House of Orange- 885: Imperial immediacy 1163 as a principality in the Holy Roman Empire; Completely sovereign as Holy Roman Empire retreated from the Kingdom of Burgundy approx. 1254; Ceded to France by the Treaty of Utrecht 1713 | Orange (France) | Principality of Orange | The principality of Orange in 1633 with south at the top and the Rhone River to the right. |
| Lord of Aumelas Seigneur de Aumelas | 1544 – 1795; -The Lordship of Aumelas was part of the titles of the first Counts of Orange, but not part of the sovereign principality. | Aumelas (Occitanie) | | Map of Aumelas |

==== Grand Duke of Luxembourg (1815–1890) ====
| Name | Timespan | Map | Coat of Arms | Historic Map |
|---|---|---|---|---|
| Grand Duke of Luxembourg Groussherzog vu Lëtzebuerg; Grand-duc de Luxembourg | 1815–1890 -The Grand Duchy was set up as an associated part of the German Confederation in 1815, but ruled by the King of the Netherlands. -In the founding of the Belgian state in 1830–1831 the status of Luxembourg was at issue. It was repartitioned with the predominantly Germanic/Luxembourgish part remaining as the independent Grand Duchy. -When William III of the Netherlands died in 1890 without a male heir, the next heir by the pact of the Nassau Family was Adolph of Nassau-Weilburg, the former Duke of Nassau, who was installed as Grand Duke. | Luxembourg City (Capital & largest city) (Luxembourg) | Grand Ducal Arms | Partitions of Luxembourg |
| Duke of Limburg Hertog van Limburg | 1839–1867 -The Duchy was set up as originally as provinces of the United Kingdom of the Netherlands (1815–1830) and an associated part of the German Confederation in 1815, but ruled by the King of the Netherlands and consolidating several older states, including the Duchy of Limburg/Hertogdom Limburg. -In the founding of the Belgian state in 1830–1831 the status of Luxembourg and Limburg was at issue. Along with Luxembourg being partitioned, the Dutch thus created the Duchy of Limburg (consisting of the Province of Limburg minus its two major cities, Maastricht and Venlo). -After 1890, Limburg was considered an integral part of the Netherlands. -The style "Duchy of Limburg" continued to be used in some official capacities until February 1907. An idiosyncrasy that survives to this day is that the King's Commissioner for the province is still informally addressed as "Governor" in Limburg, although his formal style does not differ from that used in other provinces. | Roermond (Netherlands) | Ducal Arms | The Exchange of 1839. The removal of Western Luxembourg (4) from the German customs union by Belgium (3) resulted in compensation by the Netherlands (1) by the creation of the Duchy of Limburg (2) (this territory was controlled by Belgium until 1839). |

=== Germany ===
==== Ancestral lands ====
Initially, the family was known as "of Nassau" after their oldest possession the County of Nassau and their part of the subdivision of the lands, the Countship of Nassau-Dillenburg. This was divided and subdivided amongst the descendants of John the Elder. It generally comprised the northern part of the entire county of Nassau, north of the Lahn River. It was reunited in the 18th century under the line of Nassau-Dietz.

| Name | Timespan | Map | Coat of Arms | Historic Map |
|---|---|---|---|---|
| Princely County of Nassau (Ancestral Estate of the House of Nassau, Imperial Immediate Estate); Gefürstete Grafschaft Nassau specifically Count of Nassau in Dillenburg, Siegen, Dietz, Hadamar, Beilstein, which were all subdivisions of Nassau. | 915–1866 – Founded and Acquired by the Lords of Laurenburg 915–1125 – Imperial immediacy 1093, on the death of the last Duke of Franconia – Raised to Princely County 1664 – Lost in the Austrian-Prussian War, 1866 | Nassau (Germany) | Count of Nassau | Nassau (light yellow) within the HRE during the rule of the Staufers. The Rhine is light blue line to the left. |

==== Subdivisions of Nassau ====
These subdivisions (baronies and lordships) of Nassau were split into semi-autonomous countships and principalities for the younger members of the House of Nassau. The title for these was Count of Nassau in xyz.

Lands of House of Nassau in Germany

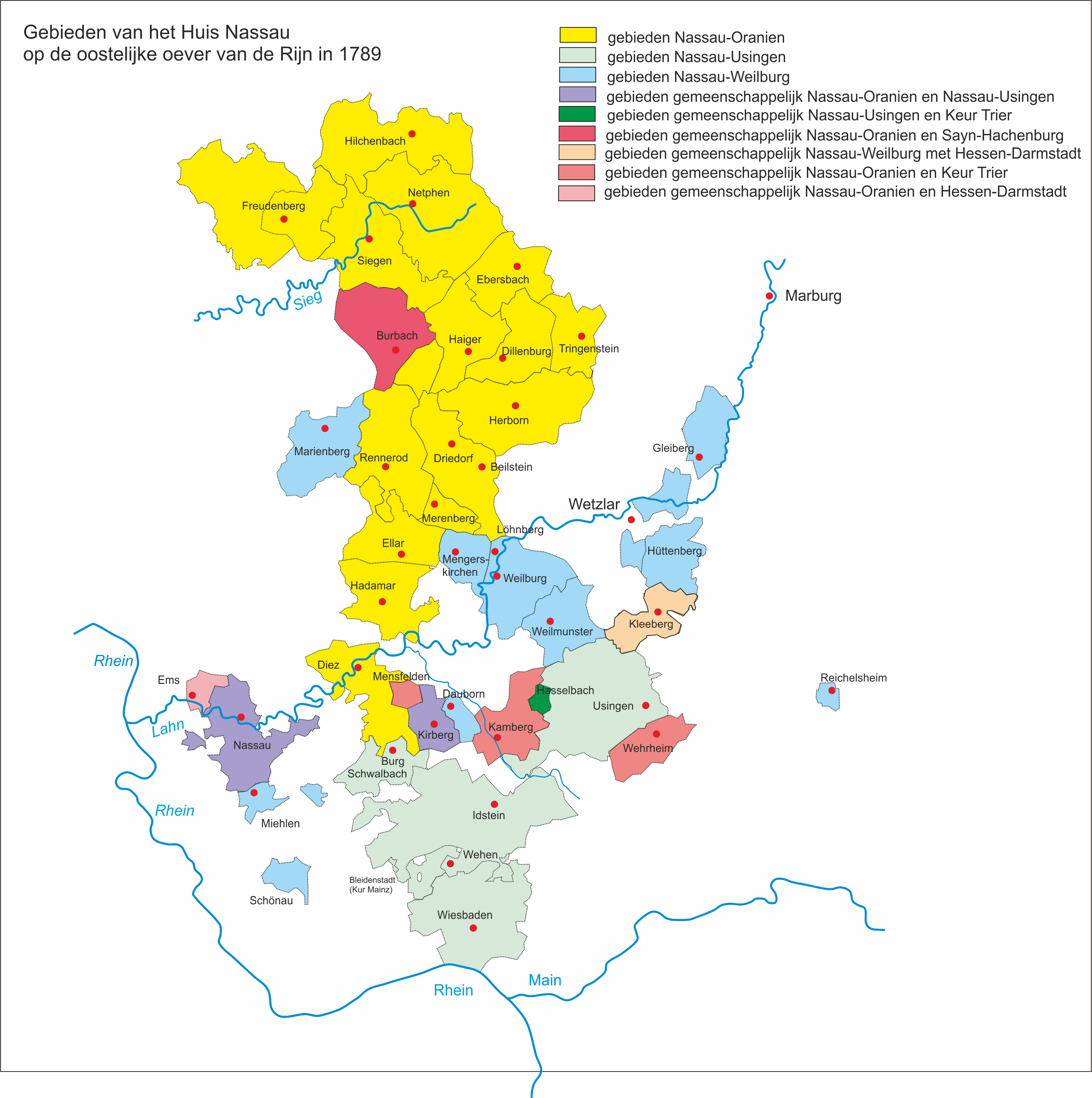
House of Nassau (Walramian and Ottonian) Lands in and around Nassau in 1789

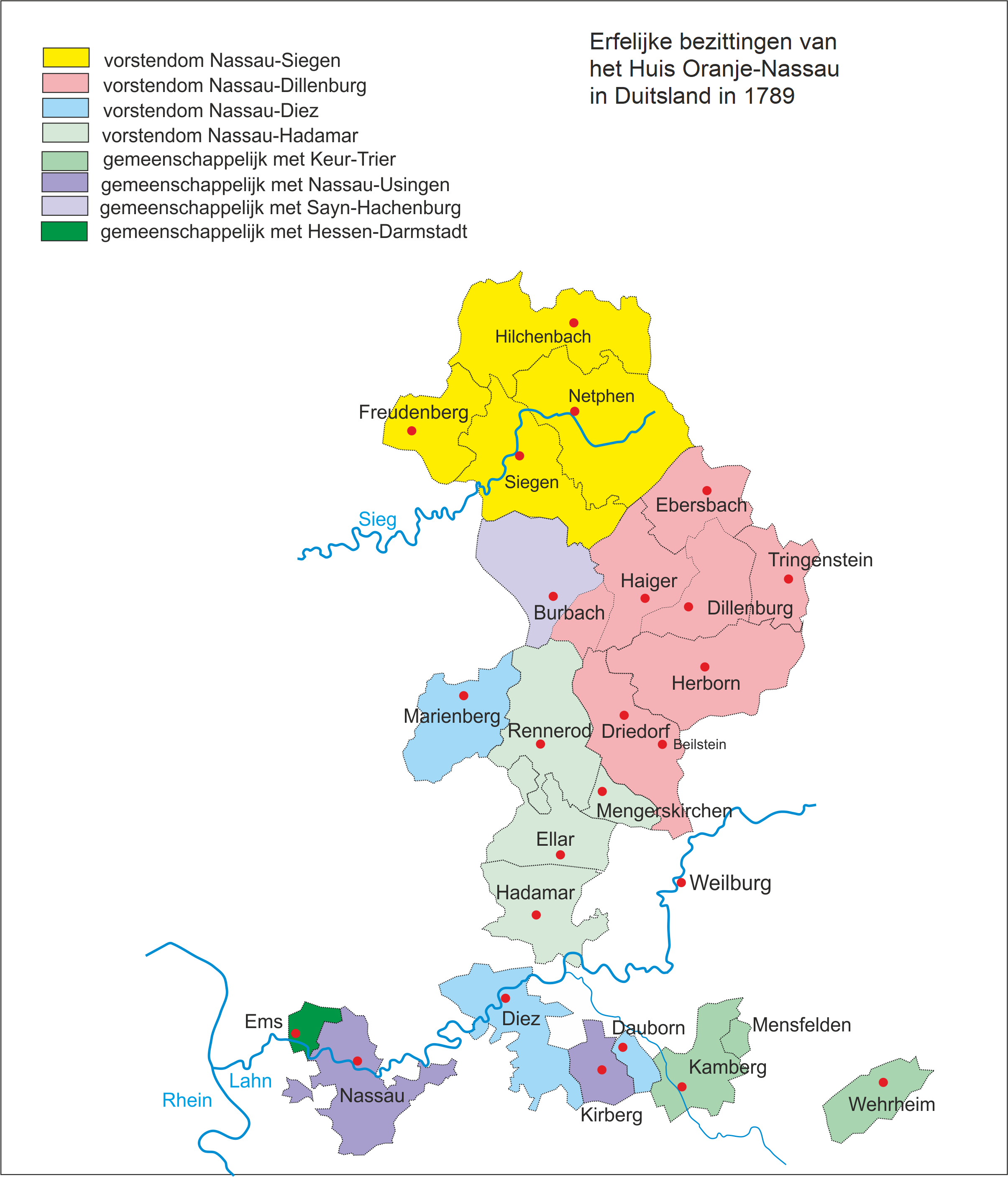
Close up of House of Orange-Nassau (Ottonian) Lands in and around Nassau in 1789

House of Nassau Lands in and around Nassau. After John VI the Elder of Nassau-Dillenburg died in 1606, Nassau-Dillenburg was divided among his five surviving sons (see genealogical table above, House of Nassau-Dillenburg): William Louis received a reduced Nassau-Dillenburg, George received Nassau-Beilstein, and John VII the Middle received Nassau-Siegen.

| Name | Timespan | Map | Coat of arms | Historic map |
|---|---|---|---|---|
| Count of Nassau in Dillenburg Barony of Dillenburg; Graf von Nassau in Dillenburg, und Herr und Baron von Dillenburg | 1254–1805 -Ancestral seat of the Royal House of the Netherlands. -Dillenburg Castle was built on top of the peak now called the Schlossberg in the late 13th or early 14th century -Usually a seat of the elder line of the Ottonian Nassaus. -Last broken off in 1504 for "William the Rich", father of William the Silent and his younger brother "John the Elder". It went John in 1544 when William went to the Netherlands to claim the inheritance of the Nassau-Breda line as Prince of Orange. -Confiscated by Napoleon in Favor of the Confederation of the Rhine/Grand Duchy of Berg. | Dillenburg (Germany) | The Counts of Nassau in Dillenburg to 1739 Civic Arms | Dillenburg in Nassau 1547 |
| County of Diez or Dietz; Grafschaft Diez or Dietz | -Probably created as a successor to the original county of the Conradines in Niederlahngau. -In 1388 part passed via his daughter Jutta to his son-in-law, Adolf I, Count of Nassau-Siegen. -In 1564 Nassau-Dillenburg and the Electorate of Hesse split the county. -The House of Nassau created a new county of Nassau-Dietz in 1606, from which the current royal family of the Netherlands is descended. The Monarchs of the Netherlands still claim this as part of their title | Diez (Germany) | Count of Diez | Diez (brown) to the west of bordering/almost surrounded by Nassau (light yellow) within the HRE during the rule of the Staufers. The northern half of Katzenellenbogen is in orange just below Diez. The Rhine is light blue line to the left. |
| Count of Nassau in Siegen Barony of Siegen; Graf von Nassau in Siegen, und Herr und Baron von Siegen | 1303-1328/1606-1743 -After John VII died in 1628, the country was divided: his eldest son, John VIII, who had converted to Catholicism, received the part of the county south of the river Sieg. John Maurice, who remained Protestant, received the part of the county north of the Sieg. -In 1743, Nassau-Siegen had died out in the male line, and the territory fell to Prince William IV of the Orange-Nassau-Dietz line, who thereby reunited all the lands of the Ottonian line of the House of Nassau. -The principality consisted of the districts of Siegen, Netphen, Hilchenbach, and Freudenberg. From 1628 to 1734, the Protestant part consisted of the districts of Hilchenbach and Freudenberg and a half the district of Siegen. At the time, the Catholic half of the district of Siegen was called the district of Hayn. The Catholic part of the county consisted of the district of Netphen and the other half of the district of Siegen. | Siegen (Germany) | The Counts of Nassau in Siegen to 1679 Counts of Nassau in Siegen to 1743 Civic Arms | The baronies and lordships of Nassau by Blaeu in 1645 |
| Count of Nassau in Beilstein Barony of Beilstein; Herr und Baron von Beilstein | Founded 1129; -Acquired by Otto I around 1287 -Usually a seat of a younger line of the Ottonian Nassaus | Nassau-Beilstein (Germany) | Lord and Baron of Beilstein | The baronies and lordships of Nassau by Blaeu in 1645 |
| Count of Nassau in Hadamar Barony of Hadamar; Herr und Baron von Hadamar | 1620–1743 -Seat of a younger line of the Ottonian Nassaus, starting with John Louis | Nassau-Hadamar (Germany) | Lord and Baron of Hadamar | The baronies and lordships of Nassau by Blaeu in 1645 |
| Count of Nassau in Schaumburg County of Holzappel, Lordship of Schaumburg; Grafschaft Holzappel, Heerschaft von Schaumburg (Schloss Schaumburg) | 1643–1692 -In 1643, the Lordship of Esterau along with the bailiwick of Isselbach was purchased by Imperial Field Marshal Peter Melander, Count of Holzappel (1641), from John Louis of Nassau-Hadamar, who was in considerable financial difficulty. Emperor Ferdinand III raised the Lordship to the Imperial County of Holzappel. -The territory of the Lordship of Schaumburg consisted of Biebrich, Cramberg and Steinsberg. -His only child Elisabeth Charlotte, Countess of Holzappel married Adolph,Count of Nassau-Dillenburg who took the title of Nassau-Schaumburg. -Elisabeth Charlotte left Holzappel to the youngest of her three daughters, Charlotte of Nassau-Schaumburg, who married Lebrecht of Anhalt-Dernburg in 1692, a cadet line of the princely house of Anhalt-Bernburg, the Princes of Anhalt-Bernburg-Schaumburg-Hoym. | Schaumburg (Germany) | Lord and Baron of Schaumburg | |

==== Other German lands ====
Additionally, the House of Nassau acquired other lands in and around their ancestral estates:

| Name | Timespan | Map | Coat of Arms | Historic Map |
|---|---|---|---|---|
| County of Katzenelnbogen (claimed); Grafschaft Katzenelnbogen | Founded and Acquired by Diether I as Vogt of Abby of Prüm Abbey; -In 1479, the male line of the Katzenelnbogens became extinct. The Obergrafschaft was passed to the Landgraves of Hesse by virtue of the 1458 marriage of Henry III of Upper Hesse to Count Philipp's daughter Anna of Katzenelnbogen -The counts of Nassau also claimed Katzenellenbogen, and the Monarchs of the Netherlands still claim this as part of their title | Katzenelnbogen (Germany) | Count of Katzenellenbogen | the County of Katzenellenbogen in Brown-Green in 1400 |
| County of Lingen; Grafschaft Lingen | Founded 1180 under Henry the Lion and Frederick Barbarossa.; -Acquired by House of Tecklenburg-Schwerin, 1388 -Conquered 1597 by Maurice of Nassau -After William III's death in 1702 was inherited by the Hohenzollern | Lingen (Germany) | Count of Lingen | the County of Lingen in 1560 |
| County of Moers; Graafschap Meurs | – -1186, independent principality -During the Eighty Years' War it was alternately captured by Spanish and Dutch troops, During the war it finally fell to Maurice of Orange.; -It did not become an integral part of the Republic, though Dutch troops were stationed there. -After the death of William III of Orange in 1702, Moers was inherited by the king of Prussia. | Moers (Germany) | Count of Meurs | the County of Muers in 1648 in grey |
| County of Spiegelberg; Grafschap van Spiegelberg | -1631 – 1819 -abt 1200, for Counts of Poppenburg -Inherited by Nassau-Diez in 1631 -Sold to King of Hannover in 1819. | Spiegelberg (Germany) | Count of Spiegelberg | the County of Spiegelberg |

==== Other paternal estates of the royal house ====
Once the House of Nassau acceded to the royal throne, the Queens married with these representatives of other royal houses:

| Name | Married | Map | Coat of Arms | Historic Map |
|---|---|---|---|---|
| Grand Duchy of Mecklenburg -Schwerin | Queen Wilhelmina m. Duke Henry of Mecklenburg-Schwerin Queen Juliana | Schwerin (Germany) | | Grand Duchy of Mecklenburg-Schwerin within the German Empire |
| Principality of Lippe -Beisterfeld | Queen Juliana m. Prince Bernhard of Lippe-Biesterfeld Queen Beatrix | Detmold, Lippe (Germany) | | Principality of Lippe within the German Empire |
| Amsberg | Queen Beatrix m. Claus von Amsberg King Willem-Alexander | N/A | | N/A |

=== The Netherlands ===
Most of the estates of the family were in the Netherlands in the more populous provinces of northern Brabant, southern Holland, and Zealand, around the delta of the Rhine/Scheldt/Maas rivers, the trading center made by them, and its entrance to the sea. The land itself was secondary to the profit on the commerce that flowed through it and the political influence that accrued with them (see Western Netherlands Commercial Center which developed into Amsterdam Trading Center, which later developed into the Dutch Randstad.).

The family properties in the Netherlands centered around the Barony of Breda. The barony sat on the delta of the Rhine in northwestern Brabant. Before the revolt the main residence of the family outside the Nassau Palace in Brussels was the castle and fortress of Breda. It was as also relatively close to their important function of Viscount of Antwerp. This fortress withstood several sieges during the 80 years war if the Dutch Revolt, but is most famous for being captured in 1624 by the Spanish as immortalized by Velazquez.

The county of Vianden sat high above a tributary of the Moselle that flowed into the trade routes of the Rhine into western Germany and the Netherlands. In the 12th to 15th centuries the counts of Vianden were the mightiest lords of the area between the rivers Rhine, Mosel and Maas. Their territory was in modern Vianden canton, Luxemburg and Bitburg-Prüm, Germany.

William the Silent married as his first wife Anna van Egmont heiress of Maximiliaan van Egmond, Count of Buren. This also included the counties of Leerdam and Lingen. While these lands devolved to Anna's son Philip William, as he died without heirs, they devolved to the prince of Orange. The hier/eldest son of the prince of Orange was titled "Count of Buren". It remains one of the subsidiary titles of the Dutch Monarch.

==== Northern Netherlands/later the Dutch Republic and the Kingdom of the Netherlands ====
These counties, baronies and lordships are in the official titulature of the monarch of the Netherlands:

| Name | From | Timespan | Map | Coat of Arms | Historic Map |
|---|---|---|---|---|---|
| Barony of Breda Baronie van Breda in Brabant/Staats-Brabant | Van Polanen family | 1403 – now: The center of all the Orange-Nassau lands in the Netherlands; 1350 sold by Duke of Brabant to John I, Lord of Polanen, the van Polanens were a cadet of the van Wassenaers; Engelbert I of Nassau married Johanna van Polanen in 1403, making the House of Nassau a large landowner in the Netherlands for the first time.; one of the titles of the Monarch of the Netherlands is still "Baron of Breda", | Breda (Benelux) | | The Barony of Breda in 1400 in dark green as part of the Duchy of Brabant in light green. The barony of Breda in northern Brabant in 1645. |
| Lord of Polanen | Van Polanen family | 1403 – now -van Polanen en Polanen Castle (near Monster) & Duivenvoorde Castle -2x Baron: van Breda (see above) and van Herstal -7x heer: van lordship of den Lek, van Geertruidenberg, van de Niervaart & van de Klundert, van Montfoort bij Heeswijk? , van Naaldwijk, en van Steenbergen | Maps of the lands of the House of Orange (Benelux) | | Map of the heerlijkheid van de Lek from van Blaeu 1645. It covered the villages of Lekkerkerk, Krimpen aan de Lek, Krimpen aan den IJssel, Ouderkerk aan den IJssel, Berkenwoude and Stormpolder, and possibly Nieuw-Lekkerland. Geertruidenberg |
| County of Buren Graafschap Buren in Gelderland | Egmond-Buren | 1395 – now: Inherited by the Egmonds.; 1498 made a county.; Inherited by Nassau Family when William the Silent married Anna van Egmont in 1551 | Buren (Benelux) | | The county of Buren in 1665 south of the Lek branch of the Rhine. |
| The County of Leerdam Graafschap van Leerdamin Utrecht | Egmond-Buren | c.1279 – now: formed a part of the Vijfheerenlanden domain, -raised County in 1498.: in 1551, inherited by Nassau Family with Acquoy when William the Silent married Anna van Egmont in 1551. | Leerdam (Benelux) | Arms of Leerdam with the arms of the Count of Leerdam on the lefthand lion. | Leerdam in the 16th century |
| The County of Culemborg Graafschap van Culemborgin Gelderland | awarded by States of Gelderland | 1748 – 1795 – Given to William IV by the States of Gelderland – Arms of Culemborg Family | Culemborg (Benelux) | Arms of Counts of Culemborg | County of Culemborg in the 17th century Municipality today |
| Barony and city of IJsselstein Baronie IJsselstein in Utrecht | Egmond-Buren | c.1279 – now: created for the Van Amstel family.; in 1363 inherited by the Inherited by Egmonds.; Inherited by Nassau Family when William the Silent married Anna van Egmont in 1551. | IJsselstein (Benelux) | | 1649 map of IJsselstein in Willem and Joan Blaeu's "Toonneel der Steden" |
| Lordship and barony of Cranendonck Heerschap en baronie van Cranendonck in Brabant/Staats-Brabant | Egmond-Buren | 1072 – 1795 – First mentioned 1223, as Castle Cranendonck, inherited by William van Cranendonck. – inherited by families Van Sevenborn, Van Milberg, Van Schoonvorst, Van Horne and Van Egmond. – 1551 inherited by Oranges when William the Silent married Anna van Edmond. | Cranendonk (Benelux) | | municipality of Cranendonk |
| Lordship and barony of Einhoven Heerschap en baronie van Eindhoven in Brabant/Staats-Brabant | Egmond-Buren | 1100 – 1795 – Motte and Bailey castle in 1100. In 1232, Eindhoven was still in the possession of Duke Henry II of Brabant, but the manor of Eindhoven was probably given to Willem, lord of Cranendonck, in 1282. – inherited by various families. The manor was then sold in 1483 to Frederik van Egmont. In 1521 he was succeeded by his son Floris van Egmont, and then his son Maximilian of Egmont in 1539. This went with his daughter Anna of Egmont when she married William of Orange in 1551. Their son was Philip Willem,became lord of Eindhoven in 1558 after the death of his mother. – Since then, the manor has always remained in the possession of the House of Nassau.. See:nl | Eindhoven (Benelux) | | municipality of Eindhoven |
| Lordship and barony of Acquoy Heerschap en baronie van Acquoy in Gelderland | Egmond-Buren | 1551–present – In 1305 Acquoy is mentioned as part of the property of the lords of Voorne. Bought by Otto van Arkel and added to the Lordship of Arkel. After Acquoy changed hands several times, it was bought by Floris van Egmond, Count of Buren, in 1513. -Through the marriage of Willem of Orange with the granddaughter of Floris van Egmond, Anna van Egmond in 1551, Acquoy, together with Leerdam, became property of the House of Orange and part of the County of Holland. The shire of Acquoy was made a barony in that time. -In 1820 it became part of West Betuwe in Gelderland. | Acquoy (Benelux) | | Acquoy within West Betuwe |
| Lordship and barony of Liesveld Heerschap en baronie van Baronie Liesveld in Holland | Bought | 1072 – 1795 – created as a lordship 1072. -1548 created a barony by Charles V for Charles van Heemstede. – 1636, bought by William Frederick of Nassau-Dietz. | Liesveld (Benelux) | | city of Liesveld |
| Lordship and city of St Martinsdijk Heerschap van Sint Maartinsdijk in Zeeland | Egmond-Buren | c.1xxx – now: created for the .; Inherited by Philip William from the Egmonds s part of the county of Buren and willed to his brothers. As the only noble left in Zealand, it gave him the position of First Noble in the Zeeland Estates (nl) and the vote for the nobility in the Estates of Zealand (Zealand gov't).; in Zeeland | St. Martinsdijk (Benelux) | | Map of St. Maartensdijk |
| Marquisate of Veere and Vlissingen markiezaat van Vlissingen en Kampenveere in Zeeland | Bought | 1582–present -Purchased in 1582 by William the Silent. It was owned by Philip II since 1567, but had fallen into arrears to the province. In 1580 the Court of Holland ordered it sold. William bought it as it gave him two more votes in the States of Zeeland, and as he was the lord, could appoint their magistrates. He already had one vote as First Noble for Philip William, who had inherited Maartensdijk. This gave William effective control of the States of Zeeland. -After William III's death, John William Friso struggled to obtain the marquisate. After his death the States of Zealand tried to ignore the claims of William IV. They abolished the title in 1732 and expropriated its freehold property. -The marquisate was finally restored in 1748, when William IV managed to establish himself as stadtholder of all the Dutch provinces. -It was abolished once again when the Dutch Republic was replaced with the Batavian Republic in 1795. -Restored for the second time in 1814. Since then, it has been held by the kings and queens of the Netherlands as a title, not an office or freehold. | Maps of the lands of the House of Orange (Benelux) | Marquis of Veere and Flushing Veere & Flushing | 1649 map of Flushing 1681 map of Walcheren |
| Barony of Cuijk Heerschap en baronie van de stad Grave en het Land van Cuijk. in Brabant/Staats-Brabant | Granted | 11th Century – 1795 – 1559 granted to William the Silent -reconquered in 1602 by Maurice of Nassau. | Maps of the lands of the House of Orange (Benelux) | Lord of Cuijk Lord of Grave | the Land van Cuijk circa 1350 |

| Name | From | Timespan | Map | Coat of Arms | Historic Map |
|---|---|---|---|---|---|
| Lordship of Baarn, Soest en Ter Eem Hoge Heerschap van Baarn, Soest en Ter Eem in Utrecht | Bought | 1674–present -The "lordship of the Zoestdijck" was purchased in 1674 by Stadtholder Willem III from the Amsterdam regent family De Graeff. -The States of Utrecht elevated Baarn, Soest and Ter Eem to high lordship in the same year. William III built the hunting palace of Soestdijk there. -After the battle for the inheritance of William III, Baarn, Soest and Ter Eem came into the possession of William IV and then his son Willem V in 1732. In 1795, Baarn, Soest and Ter Eem were confiscated by the Batavian Republic. -In 1815, the State donated Soestdijk Palace to King Willem II as a thank you for his efforts at the Battle of Waterloo. -The palace became property of the Dutch State in 1971, although Juliana and Bernard lived their until their death. | Maps of the lands of the House of Orange (Benelux) | Baarn Soest Ter Eem | Baarn Soest |
| Lordship of Bredevoort Heerschap van Bredevoort in Gelderland | Conquered | 1697–present – Maurice of Nassau, Prince of Orange conquered Bredevoort in the year 1597 on the Spanish occupation. -The Spanish reconquered the city in 1606, but Frederick Henry, Prince of Orange liberated the garrison and citizens who had retreated in the Castle of Bredevoort. -In the rampjaar ("disaster year") 1672 Bernhard von Galen reconquered the city and occupied city and herrschaft for almost two years. -In 1697 William III of England received the city and herrschaft from the States of Gelderland. From that day until 1795 the city and herrschaft was a personal belonging to the House of Orange-Nassau. King Willem-Alexander of the Netherlands is still Lord of Bredevoort. | Bredevoort (Benelux) | | Bredevoort |
| Lordship of Hooge en Lage Zwaluwe Heerschap van Hooge en Lage Zwaluwe in Brabant/Staats-Brabant | Granted by Charles V | 1518–present – Awarded to Henry III of Nassau-Breda by Emperor Charles V in 1518. – 1567 confiscated by King Philip II of Spain. Reconquered by Maurice of Nassau. – in 1732 was inherited by King Frederick William II of Prussia. In 1754 given by King Frederick II of Prussia to Prince William V. | Zwaluwe (Benelux) | | Hooge en Lage Zwaluwe |
| Lordship of Het Loo (meaning "The Lea: field, clearing, meadow"); Heerschap van Het Loo in Gelderland | Bought | 1684–present -Bought in 1684 by William III, it was owned before that by the Bentinck family. It came with the lordships of Apeldoorn, Beekbergen en Loenen. William was primarily interested in the hunting in the area. The palace he built primarily functioned for him as a hunting lodge. – In 1694 the States of Gelderland awarded William the high and low justice for the lordship. – When Wiliiam III died, the high and low lordship immediately expired. It was awarded again in 1748 to William IV. – William IV inherited it in 1732 in the settlement William III's inheritance. – It is now the property of the Dutch Royal Family. – The original Kasteel Het Oude Loo is the home of Princess Margriet. | Het Loo (Benelux) | | Hooge en Lage Het Loo with Het Loo Palace |
| Lordship of Zevenbergen and Turnhout; Heer van Zevenbergen en Turnhout in Brabant/Staats-Brabant | Granted by Philip IV | 1647–present -Given by King Philip IV of Spain to Amalia van Solms-Braunfels, wife of Prince Frederick Henry, and then to William III. – In the settlement over William III's estate in 1732 these lordships went to Willem IV and then his sone William V. – Lost to the French in 1794 and restored after 1815. In 1830 Turnhout found itself on the Belgian side of the border. | Maps of the lands of the House of Orange (Benelux) | Turnhout Zevenbergen | Turnhout Zevenbergen |
| Lordship of Willemstad; Heer van Willemstad in Brabant/Staats-Brabant | Granted by the States | 1583–present -The current name was first used in 1639 as Willemstat, and refers to William the Silent who fortified the settlement in 1583. -The settlement used to be known as Ruigenhil, and was located at a strategic location along the Hollands Diep. In 1587, the fortifications were completed, and Willemstad received a heptagon (seven sided) shape with seven bastions. | Willemstad (Benelux) | | Willemstad by Blaeu Willemstad |
| Free Lordship of Ameland; Erf- en vrijheer van Ameland in Friesland | Bought | 1708–present – Ameland is one of the Frisian islands. It remained a free lordship until the ruling family, Cammingha, died out in 1708. – After that, the mother of the Frisian stadtholder John William Friso, Prince of Orange, bought it for her son, and he became lord of Ameland. – After him, his son the stadtholder of all the Netherlands, William IV, Prince of Orange, and his grandson, William V, Prince of Orange. | Ameland (Benelux) | | Ameland |
| Lordship of Borculo & Lichtenvoorde; Heer van Borculo en Lichtenvoorde in Friesland. | Bought | 1776–present -The lordship of Borculo and Lichtenvoorde was bought in 1776 by William V from the Polish Prince Adam Kazimierz Czartoryski. – In 1795 it was confiscated by the Batavian Republic, and restored in when the Oranges were restored. – As many of these lordships were owned by the Bronkhorst Family as part of their lordships of Bronkhorst and Batenburg, you will see their arms, shown to right. Family of Borculo | Maps of the lands of the House of Orange (Benelux) | Van Bronkhorst Lordship of Borculo Lordship of Lichtenvoorde | Lordship of Borculo in 1741 Lordship of Lichtenvoorde in 1741 The County of Zutphen in the Duchy of Gelderland showing all the Orange possessions: Borculo, Lichtenvoorde, Breedevoort and Wisch |
| Lordship of Montfort; Heer van Montfort in Generality Lands – Upper Guelders of the States (Staats-Opper-Gelre | Awarded | 1647–present -The manor of Montfort was founded by Hendrik III of Guelders. -It was given by Philip IV of Spain to Stadtholder William II in 1647. After his death, Montfort came to William III. – After the battle for the inheritance of William III, Montfort came into the possession of King Frederick William I of Prussia in 1732. His son Frederick II 'the Great' sold it again to Stadtholder William V in 1769. | Montfort (Benelux) | Lordship of Montfort | Lordship of Montfort Lordship of Montfort in 1623 |

These lordships are not in the official titulature of the monarch of the Netherlands, but are cited on the board in the picture.

| Name | From | Timespan | Map | Coat of Arms | Historic Map |
|---|---|---|---|---|---|
| Lordship & Bannership of Wisch Heerlijkheid & Bannerij van Wisch in Gelderland | lords of Wisch via House of Limburg-Stirum through House of Nassau-Siegen (1646) | House of Limburg-Stirum 1646 – now – The Wisch family were Ministerialis. They were rewarded with the lordship by the Bishop of Munster. – The holder was also a bannerlord, which made them higher in the local aristocracy, but obligated them to military service. – The lordship passed into the House of Limburg-Stirum, and then by marriage in 1646 between Count Henry of Nassau-Siegen and Maria Magdalena of Limburg-Stirum. – When all the lines of Nassau died out the current Royal line of Nassau-Dietz inherited all the titles and lands. | Wisch (Benelux) | Lordship of Wisch Nassau-Siegen showing Wisch | The lordship of Wisch in 1741 |
| Lordship of :Dinteloord & Prinsenland Heerlijkheid van Dinteloord en Prinsenland in Brabant/Staats-Brabant | | 1605–present – Before the dyking and draining of the polder the area was called Dinteloord and was part of the lordship of Steenbergen.: As lord of Steenbergen (see above), Philip William, prince of Orange, in 1606 erected the area as a separate lordship named 'Prinsenland'.; – Between 1606 and 1997 the area was a separate municipality: Dinteloord and Prinsenland. After that, the municipalities were reorganized and Dinteloord and Prinsenland was merged with Steenbergen. – The monarch of the Netherlands still retains the title. | Prinsenland (Benelux) | Lordship of Prinsenland; 2 versions of the arms | The lordship of Prinsenland in the upper Left |
| Lordship of Colijnsplaat Heerlijkheid van Colijnsplaat in Zeeland | | 1598–present – The village was first mentioned in 1489 as "het gors Colinsplate", and means "sand bank belonging to Colijn". The sand bank was diked in 1598. – Colijnsplaats developed after the Oud Noord-Bevelandpolder was created in 1598. The village contains a ring road around the church. | Colijnsplaat (Benelux) | | The lordship of Colijnsplaat Colijnsplaat in the town of Noord-Beveland |
| Lordship of Scherpenisse Heerlijkheid van Scherpenisse in Zeeland | Egmond-Buren | 1551–present: The name Scherpenisse is first mentioned in 1203 as Scarpenesse.; -Scherpenisse was one of the five islands that would together form the island of Tholen. The village arose near a dammed side channel of the Oosterschelde. -The area became property of the House of Orange in 1551 from Anna of Egmont & Buren | Scherpenisse (Benelux) | Lordship of Scherpenisse Town of Scherpenisse | Scherpenisse in the municipality of Tholen |

==== The Southern Netherlands/later the Spanish and Austrian Netherlands, and the Kingdom of Belgium ====
While not as substantial as their interests in the northern Netherlands, the estates in the southern Netherlands were in the more populous provinces, in this case Brabant (most importantly Antwerp) around the river systems that ultimately flowed to the sea through the commercial entrepot of Antwerp. Again, the land itself was secondary to the profit on the commerce that flowed through it and the political influence that accrued with them (see Southern Netherlands Commercial Center which developed into Antwerp Trading Center, which later developed into the Belgian Flemish Diamond.).

| Name | From | Timespan | Map | Coat of Arms | Historic Map |
|---|---|---|---|---|---|
| Burgrave (Viscount) of Antwerp Burgraaf van Antwerpen in Brabant | lords of Heinsberg | title from the Margraviate of Antwerp(nl) as an inheritable office by the lords of Heinsberg.; -It passed down through several families until finally inherited and traded for by Engelbrecht II of Nassau-Breda in 1499. -The most famous holder was William the Silent. -It was a center for the Dutch Revolt before its recapture by the Spanish and confiscation of the position by Philip II in 1567. -Subsequently in the Low Countries, the rank of burggraaf evolved into the nobility synonymous with viscount. The title "Viscount of Antwerp" is still claimed by the reigning monarch of the Netherlands as one of its subsidiary titles. | Antwerp (Benelux) | | City of Antwerp in 1572 looking up the Scheldt at its height as the entrepôt of Western Capitalism |
| Lordship and barony of Diest Heerschap en baronie van Diest in Brabant | lords of Heinsberg | 1499 – 1795 -Engelbrecht II of Nassau-Breda became baron in 1499, through an exchange of territories with Duke William IV of Gulik (see Antwerp below). -Confiscated 1567, given back to Philip William in 1596. After Maurice, it was claimed by the Catholic John VIII of Nassau-Siegen, which was recognized in 1625 (see other lands of the Nassaus in Spanish Netherlands). Returned to prince of Orange in 1648 with Peace of Munster. -orig arms of Lords of Diest: changed in the 1500s to the ones shown at right. | Diest (Benelux) | | municipality of Diest within Flemish Brabant |
| Lordship and of Zichem Heerschap van nl:Titels van de Nederlandse koninklijke familie#Burggraaf van Antwerpen Zichem in Brabant | lords of Heinsberg | 1499 – 1795 -Part of inheritance that brought the Burgraviate of Antwerp (see above) | Zichem (Benelux) | | Zichem in Flemish Brabant |
| Lordship and barony of Warneton Heerschap en baronie van Waasten in County of Hainaut (now Hainaut Province) | House of Luxembourg | 1511 – 1795 -The barony of Warneton (called Waasten in Dutch) was mentioned as a seigneury as early as the 13th century. -It was a possession of the House of Luxembourg. Louise Francisca of Savoy, the first wife of Henry III of Nassau-Breda, was the daughter of Mary of Luxembourg-Ligny. -Henry III received the manor in 1511. Also confiscated as other Nassau lands in the Southern Netherlands by Philip II. Returned with the Peace of Munster in 1648. | Warneton (Benelux) | | municipality of Warneton within Waloon Hainault |

These lordships are not mentioned in the titulature, but are shown on the board of Lordships:

| Name | From | Timespan | Map | Coat of Arms | Historic Map |
|---|---|---|---|---|---|
| Lordship and barony of Meerhout Heerschap en baronie van Meerhout in Brabant | | | Meerhout (Benelux) | | municipality of Meerhout within Flemish Brabant |
| Lordship and barony of Vorst Heerschap en baronie van Vorst in Brabant | | | ? (Benelux) | which are the arms of the Lords of Diest above | |

=== The Duchy of Luxembourg/later the Grand Duchy of Luxembourg ===
| Name | From | Timespan | Map | Coat of Arms | Historic Map |
|---|---|---|---|---|---|
| County of Vianden Graafschap Vianden in Luxembourg | Lords of Sponheim | approx. 1100 – approx 1566: Founded and Acquired by the Lords of Sponheim 915 – 1125; Inherited by Nassau Family 1417 from Elisabeth van Sponheim-Kreuznach.; -Subsidiary lordships: St. Vith (nl), Bűtgenbach, Dasburg, Grimbergen arms: // – seized by Philip II of Spain in 1567. Awarded to Philip William, and then the catholic house of Nassau-Siegen. Returned to Oranges with peace of Munster in 1648. -Confiscated by the French in 1786. | Maps of the lands of the House of Orange (Benelux) | | The region around Vianden in 1400. Vianden is in light green surrounded by the duchy of Luxembourg in light brown. In the 12th to 15th centuries the counts of Vianden were the mightiest lords of the area between the rivers Rhine, Mosel and Maas. |

=== Franche-Comté (Free County of Burgundy) ===
Franche-Comté was controlled by the King of Spain, so the princes of Orange lost control of the lands that they had inherited from the previous princes of Orange, the House of Chalon-Arlay, the Viscountship of Besançon and lordships of Chalons itself, Arlay, Nozeroy. By the time the King of France had conquered the county of Burgundy, the prince of Orange (William III) was at odds with the King, Louis XIV.

| Name | From | Timespan | Map | Coat of Arms | Historic Map |
|---|---|---|---|---|---|
| Baron of Arlay Baron de Arlay | House of Chalon-Arlay | 1544 – 1795; -In the thirteenth century the barony of Arlay, on the borders with the Bresse region, passed into the dynasty of the counts of Châlons, the preeminent noblemen in the south of the Franche-Comté. They controlled the exploitation of salt mined at Salins. – Their heirs became Princes of Orange in the early fifteenth century, when Jean III de Chalon-Arlay married the heiress of the Principality of Orange -It passed to Rene of Chalons and his heir William the Silent and the house of Nassau. Confiscated by Philip II in 1567, but restored with the Peace of Munster in 1648. Fell to the inheritance of William IV from William III. -The title baron of Arlay is still held by Willem-Alexander of the Netherlands. | Arlay (Bourgogne-Franche-Comté) | Barons of Arlay & Barons of Chalons-Arlay (after 1256) | Map of County of Burgundy showing Arlay, 1716 |
| Baron of Nozeroy Baron de Nozeroy | House of Chalon-Arlay | 1544 – 1795; -In the thirteenth century the barony of Arlay, on the borders with the Bresse region, passed into the dynasty of the counts of Châlons, the preeminent noblemen in the south of the Franche-Comté. They controlled the exploitation of salt mined at Salins. – Their heirs became Princes of Orange in the early fifteenth century, when Jean III de Chalon-Arlay married the heiress of the Principality of Orange -It passed to Rene of Chalons and his heir William the Silent and the house of Nassau. Confiscated by Philip II in 1567, but restored with the Peace of Munster in 1648. Fell to the inheritance of William IV from William III. -The title baron of Nozeroy is still held by Willem-Alexander of the Netherlands. | Nozeroy (Bourgogne-Franche-Comté) | Barons of Nozeroy | County of Burgundy at the end of the XVth Century showing Nozeroy |
| Baron of Orpierre Baron de Orpierre | House of Chalon-Arlay | 1544 – 1702; – 1349 left to Jean II de Chalon-Arlay, prince of Orange by his cousin. – With the death of William III († 1702), went to the French contenders for William's inheritance: François-Louis de Conti († 1709) and then his son Louis-Armand de Conti († 1727. – United to the crown of France in April 1731, attached to the province of the Dauphiné in 1734. | Orpierre (Provence-Alpes-Côte d'Azur) | Barons of Orpierre | Location of Orpierre |
| Viscount of Besançon Vicomté de Besançon | House of Chalon-Arlay | 1184 – 1795; -Imperial Free City 1184, independent Imp Free City 1290 -The Burgrave (Viscount) functioned as an office in other burgraviates in the Empire's other Free Cities. -Confiscated 1567, given back to Philip William in 1596. After Maurice, it was claimed by the Catholic John VIII of Nassau-Siegen, which was recognized in 1625 (see other lands of the Nassaus in Spanish Netherlands). Returned to prince of Orange in 1648 with Peace of Munster. -The office of viscount was the same as the rank of burgrave in the Holy Roman Empire, of which the County of Burgundy as part of . | Besançon (Bourgogne-Franche-Comté) | Viscounts of Besançon | County of Burgundy at the end of the XVth Century showing Nozeroy |

| Name | From | Timespan | Map | Coat of Arms | Historic Map |
|---|---|---|---|---|---|
| Chalon Comte de Chalon Did these go to the Nassaus? | | 10th century–1401: 1401, the last count died; -his heir Odo of Thoire-Geneva sold the comté to Count Amadeus VIII of Savoy. -members of the Genevan House protested, and the House of Chalons (and, after its extinction, the House of Orange-Nassau) remained the strongest claimant. | Geneva (France) | Counts of Chalons | The county of Burgundy |

=== Switzerland ===
| Name | Timespan | Map | Coat of Arms | Historic Map |
|---|---|---|---|---|
| Count of Geneva (titular) Comté de Genève | 10th century–1401: 1401, the last count died; -his heir Odo of Thoire-Geneva sold the comté to Count Amadeus VIII of Savoy. -members of the Genevan House protested, and the House of Chalons (and, after its extinction, the House of Orange-Nassau) remained the strongest claimant. | Geneva (France) | County of Geneva | The county of Geneva in the Arelat c.1200 |
