= Prins van Oranje (disambiguation) =

Prins van Oranje is a title given to the male heir apparent of the Dutch throne.

Prins van Oranje or De Prins van Oranje may also refer to:

== Military ==
- Prins van Oranje-class minelayer, a class of two minelayers in service with the Royal Netherlands Navy from 1932–43
- Regiment Huzaren Prins van Oranje, an armoured regiment of the Royal Netherlands Army.

== Windmills ==
- De Prins Van Oranje, Bredevoort, a windmill in Gelderland
- De Prins Van Oranje, Buren, a windmill in Gelderland

== See also ==
- List of princes and princesses of Orange
