= Château de Montfort (Cote-d'Or) =

Castle in the French commune of Montigny-Montfort

Coordinates: 47.5925°N 4.3250°E

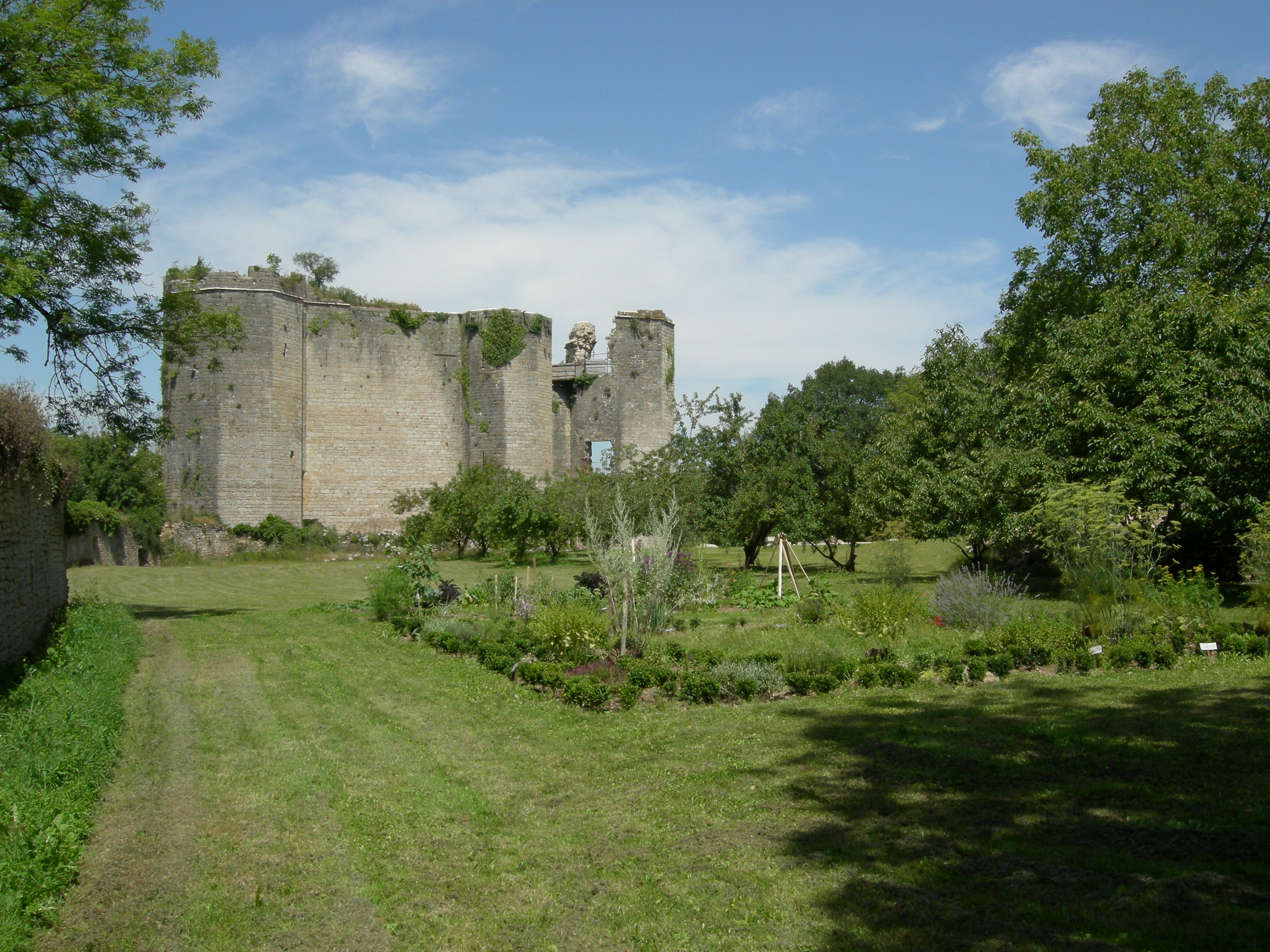
Chateau de Montfort in Montigny-Montfort

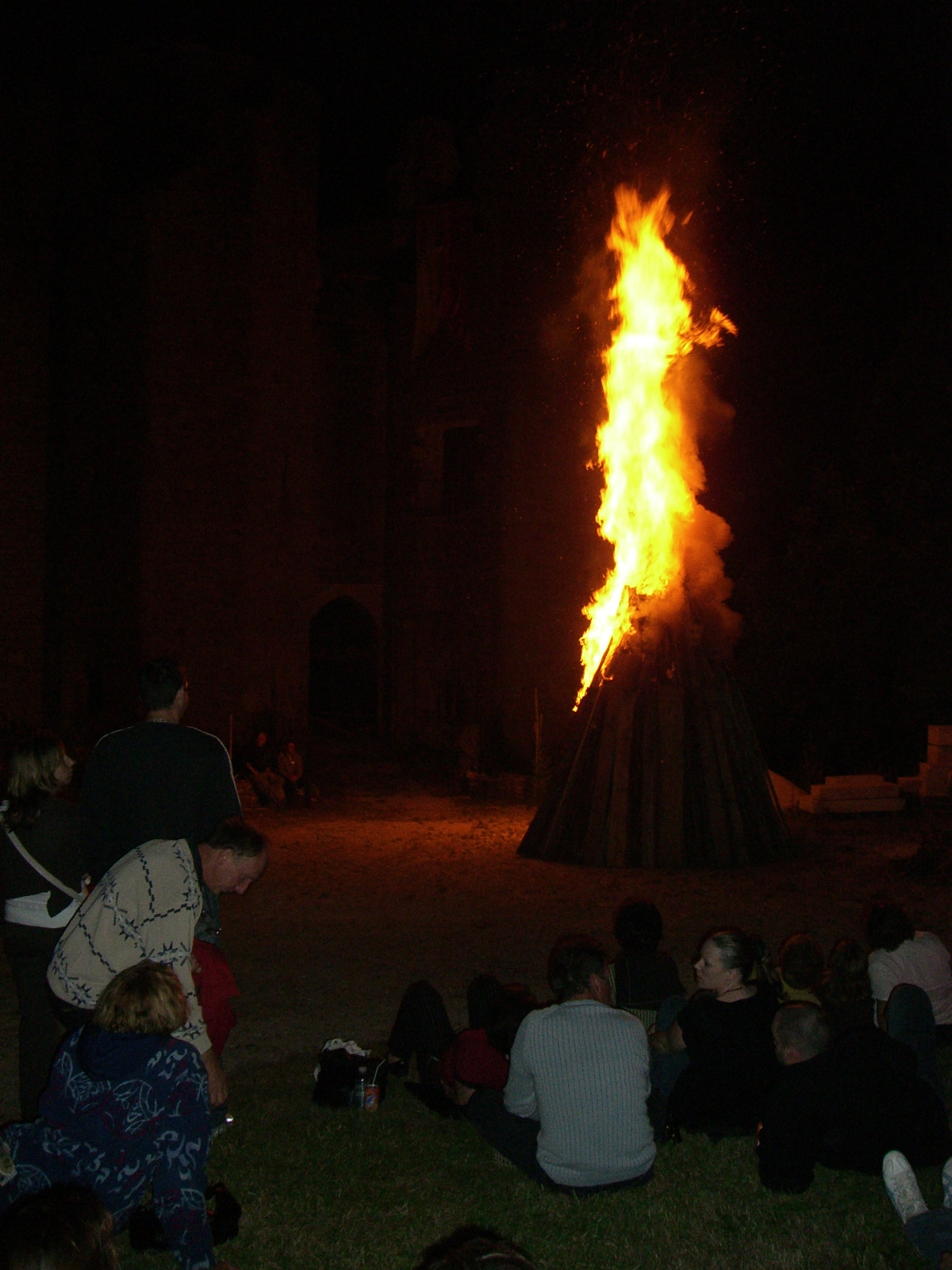
St. John's Fire has been lit as villagers and tourists watch, sitting on the lawn in the courtyard of Chateau de Montfort, Montigny-Montfort

The Château de Montfort is a castle in the French commune of Montigny-Montfort in the Côte-d'Or département, part of the Burgundy region. The castle was built in the 18th century.

It is well known for St. John's Fire (Feu de Saint-Jean) on St. John's Eve, as part of Medieval Festival of Château Montfort (Fête Médiévale au Château de Montfort), held in the castle every year around June 21–24.

== See also ==
- List of castles in France
- St. John's Day
