= Montigny-Montfort =

- Commune
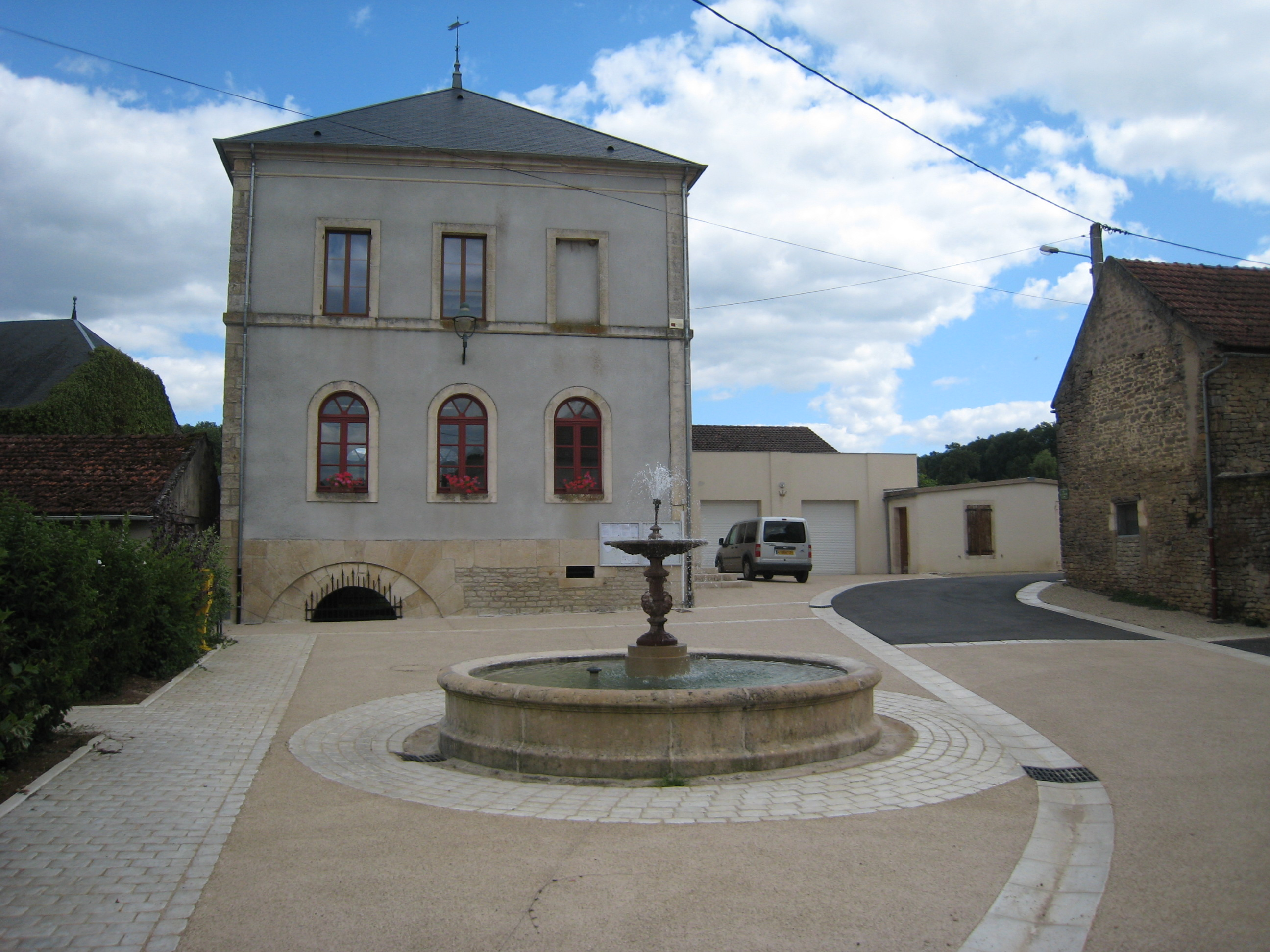
- Town hall
- Location of Montigny-Montfort
- Location within France Location within Bourgogne-Franche-Comté
- Coordinates: 47°34′44″N 4°20′43″E
- Country: France
- Region: Bourgogne-Franche-Comté
- Department: Côte-d'Or
- Arrondissement: Montbard
- Canton: Montbard
- Intercommunality: Montbardois

Government
  - Mayor (2020–2026): Claude Jacques
- Area^{1}: 17.13 km^{2} (6.61 sq mi)
- Elevation: 270 m (890 ft)
- Highest elevation: 400 m (1,300 ft)
- Lowest elevation: 227 m (745 ft)
- Population (2023): 268
  - Density: 15.6/km^{2} (40.5/sq mi)
- Time zone: UTC+01:00 (CET)
  - Summer (DST): UTC+02:00 (CEST)
- INSEE/Postal code: 21429 /21500
- ^{1} French Land Register data, which excludes lakes, ponds, glaciers > 1 km^{2} (0.386 sq mi or 247 acres) and river estuaries.

Montigny-Montfort (French pronunciation: [mɔ̃tiɲi mɔ̃fɔʁ]) is a commune in the Côte-d'Or department in eastern France.

== Population ==
Historical population
Year	Pop.	±% p.a.
1968	289	—
1975	309	+0.96%
1982	328	+0.86%
1990	318	−0.39%
1999	290	−1.02%
2007	291	+0.04%
2012	299	+0.54%
2017	300	+0.07%
2023	268	−1.86%
Source: INSEE

== See also ==
- Communes of the Côte-d'Or department
- Chateau de Montfort
