= Eembrugge =

- Hamlet
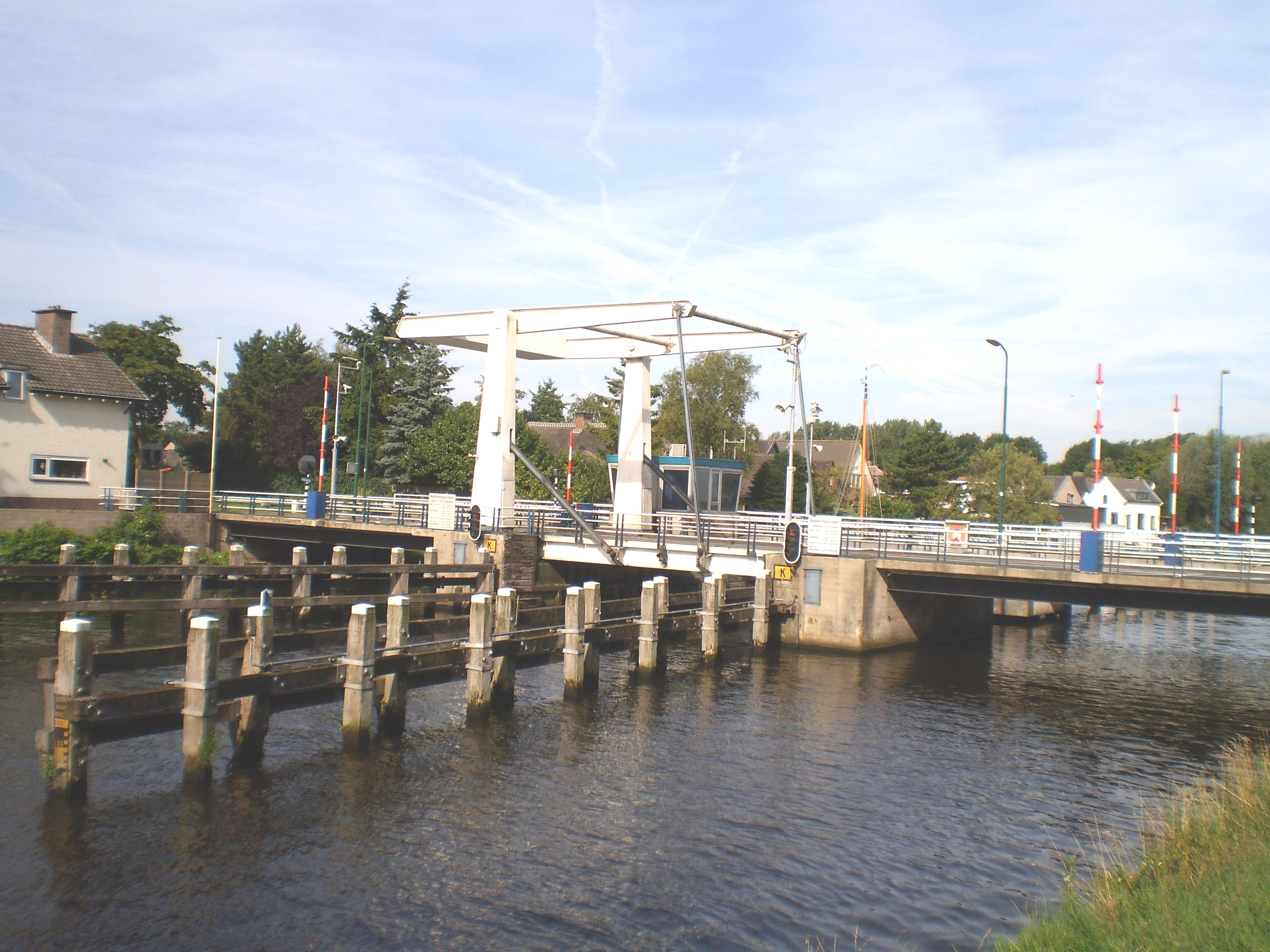
- Eembrugge (2009)

- Location in the Netherlands Eembrugge (Netherlands)
- Coordinates: 52°13′N 5°18′E
- Country: Netherlands
- Province: Utrecht
- Municipality: Baarn; Eemnes

Area
  - Total: 0.29 km^{2} (0.11 sq mi)

Population (2021)
  - Total: 35
  - Density: 120/km^{2} (310/sq mi)
- Time zone: UTC+1 (CET)
  - Summer (DST): UTC+2 (CEST)
- Postal code: 3755
- Dialing code: 035

Eembrugge is a hamlet and former city on the river Eem, east of Baarn, in the Netherlands. It received city rights between 1336 en 1340, but was destroyed in 1527. Eembrugge is partially in the municipality of Eemnes, partially in Baarn.

== History ==
It was first mentioned in 1254 as "in orientale parte ecclesie de Ema", and means bridge over the Eem which was built in the 12th century. Eembrugge received city rights between 1336 and 1340 by Jan III van Diest, the Prince-Bishopric of Utrecht. In 1527, Eembrugge was destroyed by the Duke of Gelre. Later, it became a little hamlet, and was overshadowed by neighbouring Eemnes. The church collapsed in the late-16th century after a flood, and was demolished in 1702. In 1840, it was home to 129 people.

== Gallery ==
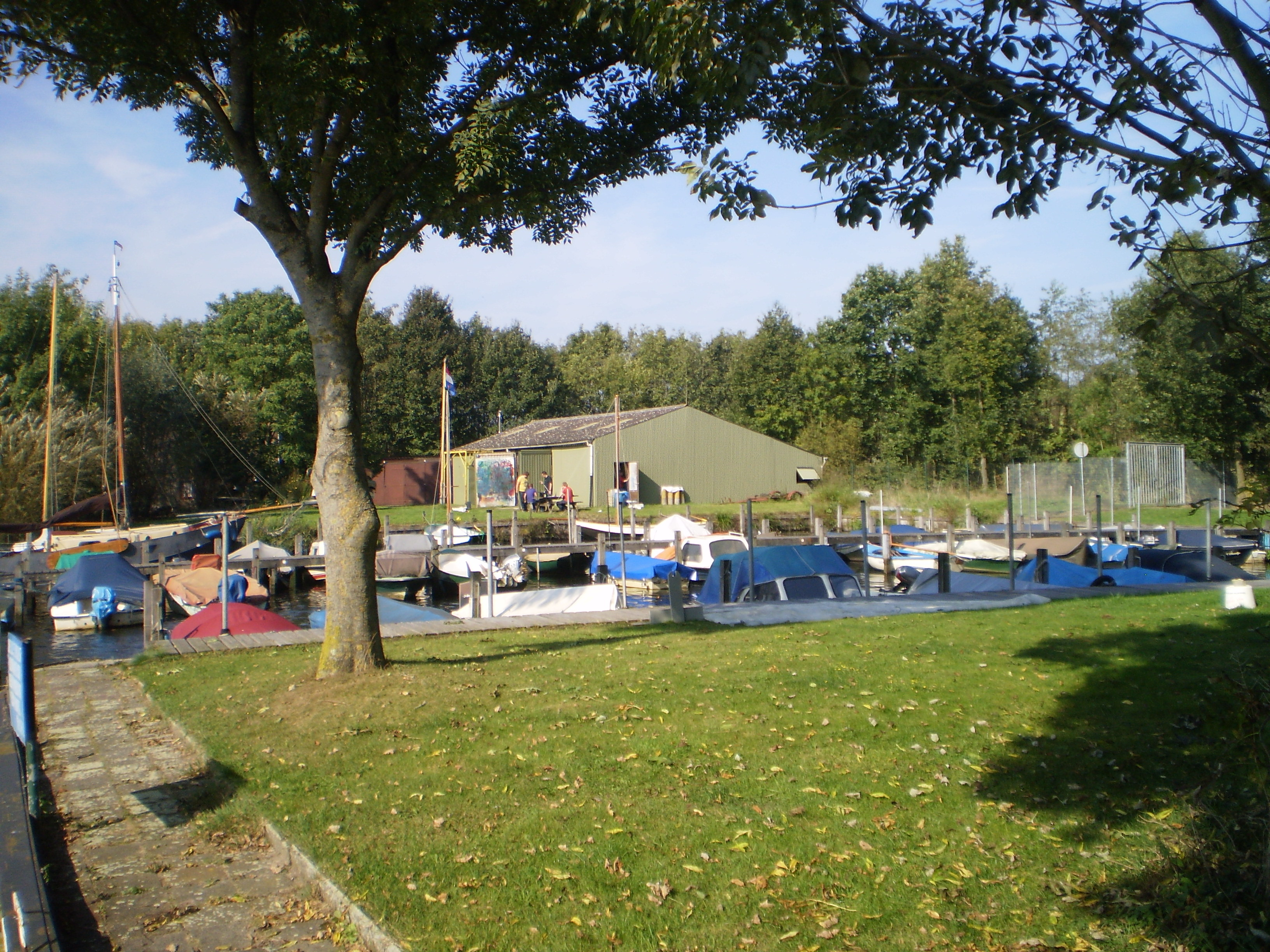
Harbour
