= Beilstein, Hesse =

Beilstein
- Ortsteil of Greifenstein
- Interactive map of Beilstein
- Location within Germany Location within Hesse
- Coordinates: 50°36′39″N 8°14′39″E
- Country: Germany
- State: Hesse
- Municipality: Greifenstein

Area
  - Total: 10.24 km^{2} (3.95 sq mi)
- Elevation: 370 m (1,210 ft)

Population (2020-12-31)
  - Total: 1,457
  - Density: 142.3/km^{2} (368.5/sq mi)
- Time zone: UTC+01:00 (CET)
  - Summer (DST): UTC+02:00 (CEST)
- Postal codes: 35753
- Dialling codes: 02779

Beilstein (German pronunciation: [ˈbaɪlʃtaɪn]) is a village in the German municipality Greifenstein, in the state Hesse. In December 2020, Beilstein counted 1,457 inhabitants, and its area is 10.24 km^{2} (3.95 sq mi). The village is located about 10 km southwest of Herborn, 17 km northwest of the city Wetzlar and about 80 km north of Frankfurt am Main. Beilstein is located in the eastern part of the Westerwald mountain range in Hessen, near the border with Rheinland-Pfalz.

The current day village is a combination of the villages Beilstein, Haiern and Wallendorf. Written records of Wallendorf trace back to the year 774. Beilstein itself was granted city rights on 18 February 1321 by the count of Nassau. Haiern is part of Beilstein since 1941.

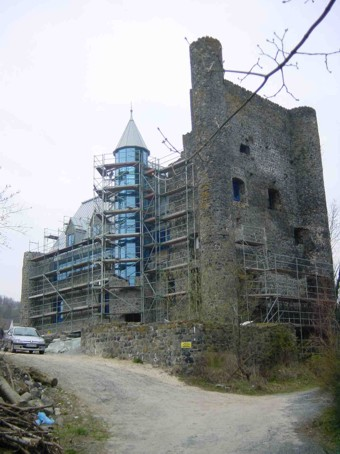
Burg Beilstein

Burg Beilstein (Castle of Beilstein), was mentioned in official records in 1129 for the first time, and was expanded around 1320 by the counts of Nassau. Beilstein was between 1607 and 1620 the residence of a branch of the house Nassau-Dillenburg with George, Count of Nassau-Dillenburg. In 1977, the town was merged into the municipality of Greifenstein.

The King of the Netherlands is also styled Baron of Beilstein. See also Style of the Dutch sovereign.
