= Bentheim-Lingen =

Bentheim-Lingen was a county seated in Lingen in Germany. Bentheim-Lingen emerged as a partition of Bentheim-Tecklenburg in 1450, and was absorbed by Spain in 1555. Over the next century, ownership of Bentheim-Lingen passed between Spain and Nassau-Orange, before being annexed by Prussia 1702.

== Counts of Bentheim-Lingen (1450–1555) ==
- Otto (1450–1508) with...
- Nicholas III (Count of Bentheim-Tecklenburg) (1493–1508)
- Nicholas IV (1508–1541)
- Conrad (Count of Bentheim-Tecklenburg) (1541–1547)
- Maximilian (1547–1548)
- Anna (1548–1555)
