= Houtrijk en Polanen =

Coordinates: 52.383877°N 4.753261°E

- Interactive map of Houtrijk en Polanen
- Municipality: Netherlands
- Time zone: WET/WEST (UTC+0/+1)

Houtrijk en Polanen is a former municipality in the Dutch province of North Holland. It existed from 1817 to 1863, when it was merged with Haarlemmerliede en Spaarnwoude.

Houtrijk en Polanen was the area on the south side of the former IJ Bay between Haarlem and Amsterdam, around the town of Halfweg.
