= Dasburg =

- Municipality
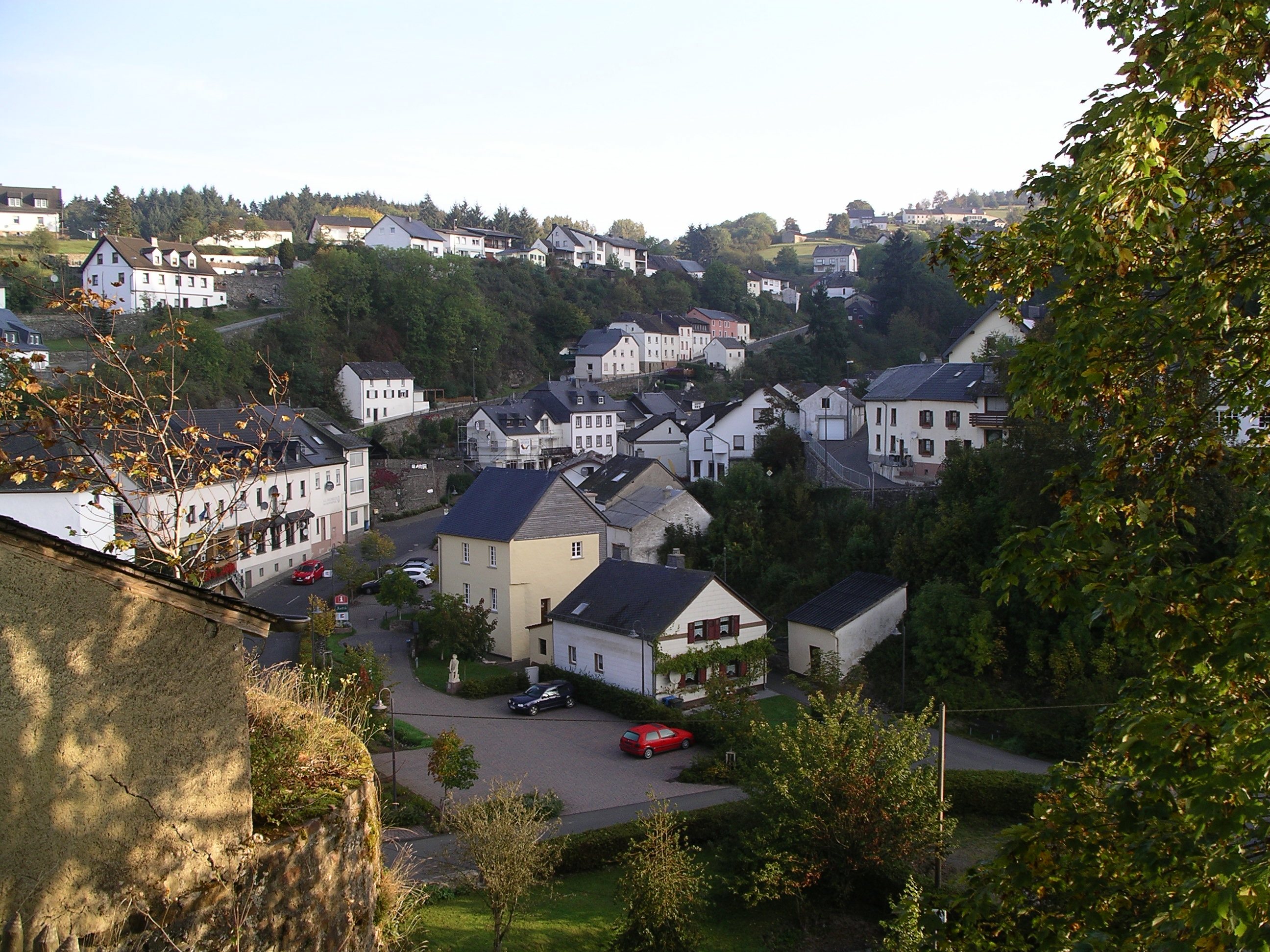

- Coat of arms

- Location of Dasburg within Eifelkreis Bitburg-Prüm district
- Interactive map of Dasburg
- Location within Germany Location within Rhineland-Palatinate
- Coordinates: 50°3′00″N 6°8′02″E
- Country: Germany
- State: Rhineland-Palatinate
- District: Eifelkreis Bitburg-Prüm
- Municipal assoc.: Arzfeld

Government
  - Mayor (2019–24): Silke Nelles

Area
  - Total: 4.78 km^{2} (1.85 sq mi)
- Elevation: 264–539 m (866–1,768 ft)

Population (2025-12-31)
  - Total: 215
  - Density: 45.0/km^{2} (116/sq mi)
- Time zone: UTC+01:00 (CET)
  - Summer (DST): UTC+02:00 (CEST)
- Postal codes: 54689
- Dialling codes: 06550
- Vehicle registration: BIT
- Website: www.dasburg.de

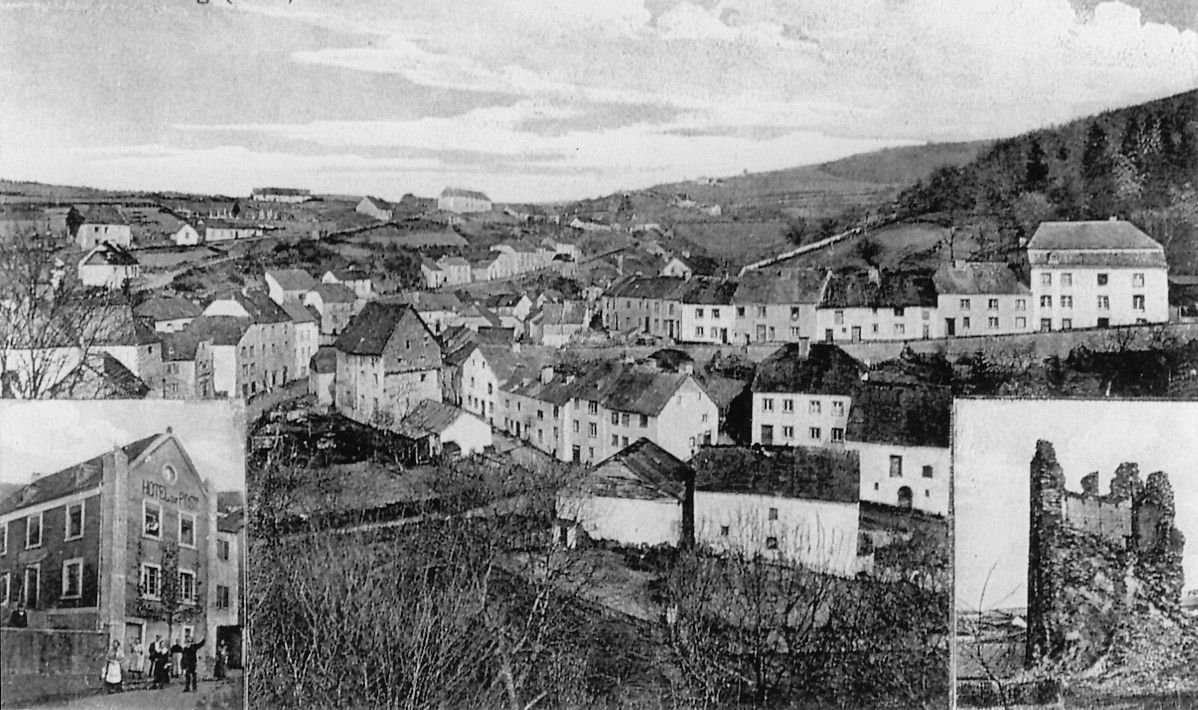
Dasburg at about 1910

Dasburg is a municipality in the district of Bitburg-Prüm, in Rhineland-Palatinate, western Germany.

Before the French Revolutionary Wars it was a part of the Duchy of Luxemburg.
