= Nozeroy =

Commune in Bourgogne-Franche-Comté, France

- Commune
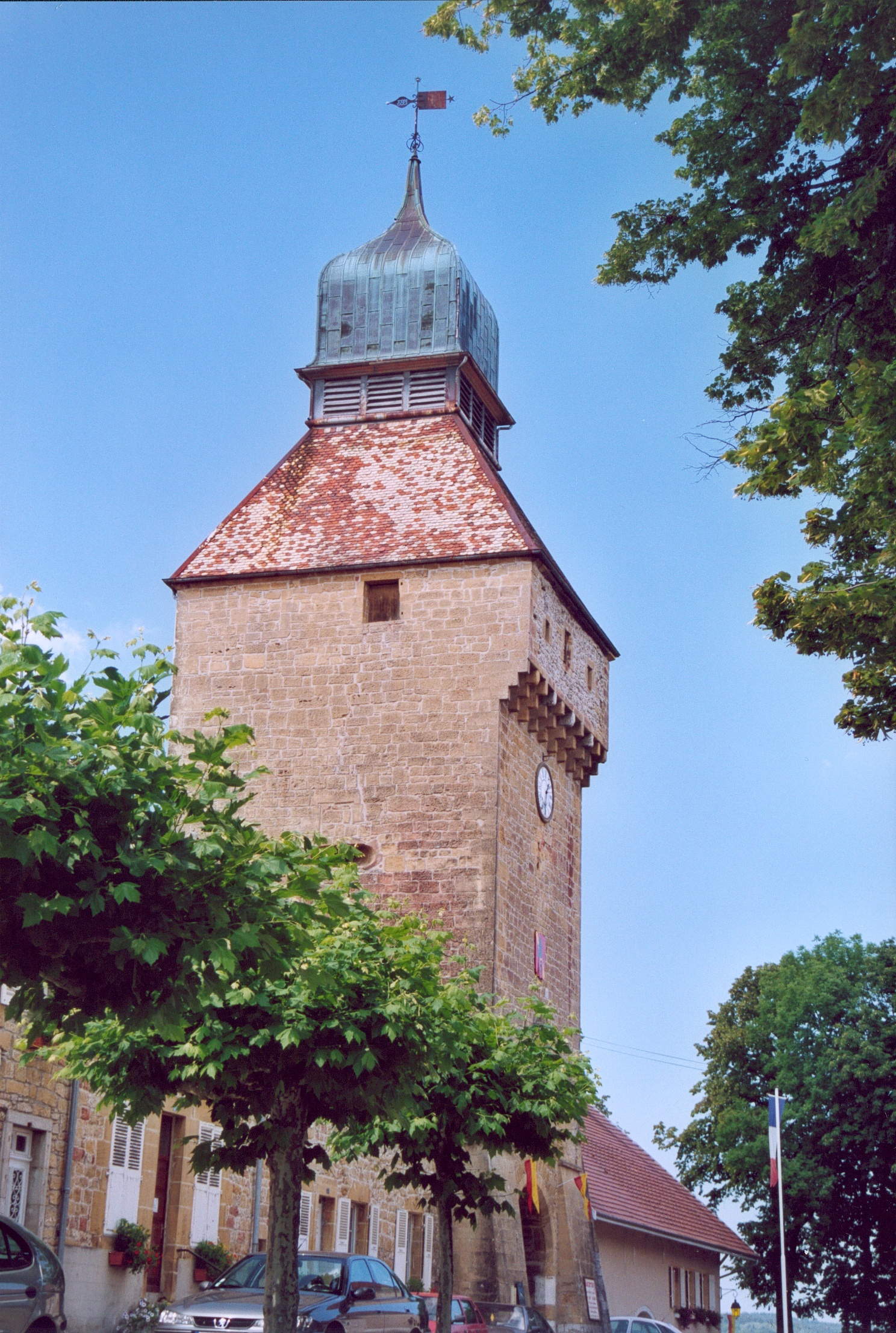
- Town gate

- Coat of arms
- Location of Nozeroy
- Location within France Location within Bourgogne-Franche-Comté
- Coordinates: 46°46′31″N 6°02′14″E
- Country: France
- Region: Bourgogne-Franche-Comté
- Department: Jura
- Arrondissement: Lons-le-Saunier
- Canton: Saint-Laurent-en-Grandvaux

Government
  - Mayor (2020–2026): Dominique Chauvin
- Area^{1}: 3.74 km^{2} (1.44 sq mi)
- Highest elevation: 834 m (2,736 ft)
- Lowest elevation: 660 m (2,170 ft)
- Population (2023): 393
  - Density: 105/km^{2} (272/sq mi)
- Time zone: UTC+01:00 (CET)
  - Summer (DST): UTC+02:00 (CEST)
- INSEE/Postal code: 39391 /39250
- ^{1} French Land Register data, which excludes lakes, ponds, glaciers > 1 km^{2} (0.386 sq mi or 247 acres) and river estuaries.

Nozeroy (French pronunciation: [nɔzʁwa]) is a commune in the Jura department in Bourgogne-Franche-Comté in eastern France.

== Population ==
Historical population
Year	Pop.	±% p.a.
1968	416	—
1975	431	+0.51%
1982	429	−0.07%
1990	416	−0.38%
1999	422	+0.16%
2007	399	−0.70%
2012	412	+0.64%
2017	437	+1.19%
2023	393	−1.75%
Source: INSEE

== See also ==
- Communes of the Jura department
