= List of troubadours and trobairitz =

This is a list of troubadours and trobairitz, men and women who are known to have composed lyric verse in the Old Occitan language.

They are listed alphabetically by first name. Those whose first name is uncertain or unknown are listed by nickname or title, ignoring any initial definite article (i.e., lo, la). All entries are given in Old Occitan (where known) and a standardized spelling (where possible). Thus, e.g., William IX of Aquitaine is listed under Guilhem, the Occitan form of William.

== A ==
- Ademar de Peiteus
- Ademar de Rocaficha
- Ademar Jordan
- Ademar lo Negre
- Aimeric de Belenoi
- Aimeric de Peguilhan
- Aimeric de Sarlat
- Alaisina
- Alamanda de Castelnau
- Alberjat
- Albert Malaspina
- Albert de Saint Bonet
- Albertet Cailla
- Albertet de Sestaro
- Albric
- Aldric del Vilar
- Alegret
- Alexandre
- Almucs de Castelnau
- Amanieu de la Broqueira
- Amanieu de Sescars
- Amoros dau Luc
- Anfos, reis d'Aragon
- Arnaut Bernart de Tarascon
- Arnaut de Brantalo
- Arnaut Catalan
- Arnaut Daniel
- Arnaut de Cumenge
- Arnaut de Maroill
- Arnaut de Tintinhac
- Arnaut Guilhem de Marsan
- Arnaut Peire d'Agange
- Arnaut Plagues
- Arnaut Romieu
- Arnaut Vidal de Castelnou d'Ari
- Arver
- At de Mons
- Audoi
- Audric del Vilar
- Austorc d'Aorlhac
- Austorc de Segret
- Austorc del Boy
- Aycart del Fossat
- Azalais d'Altier
- Azalais de Porcairagues

== B ==
- Baussan
- Berenguer d'Anoia
- Berenguier de Palazol
- Berenguier de Poivent
- Berenguier de Poizrengier
- Berenguier Trobel
- Bermon Rascas
- Bernart Alanhan de Narbona
- Bernart Amoros
- Bernart Arnaut d'Armagnac
- Bernart Arnaut de Moncuc
- Bernart d'Astarac
- Bernart d'Auriac
- Bernart de Bondeills
- Bernart de Durfort
- Bernart de la Barta
- Bernart de la Fon
- Bernart de Panassac
- Bernart de Pradas
- Bernart de Rovenac
- Bernart de Tot-lo-mon
- Bernart de Ventadorn
- Bernart de Venzac
- Bernart Marti
- Bernart Sicart de Marvejols
- Bernart Tortitz
- Bertolome Zorzi
- Bertran Albaric
- Bertran Astorgat
- Bertran Carbonel
- Bertran d'Alamanon
- Bertran d'Aurel
- Bertran de Born
- Bertran de Born lo Filhs
- Bertran de Gordo
- Bertran de la Tor
- Bertran de Paris
- Bertran de Preissac
- Bertran de Saint Felitz
- Bertran del Pojet
- Bertran Folcon d'Avinhon
- Bieiris de Romans
- Blacasset
- Blacatz
- Bonafe
- Bonafos
- Bonfilh
- Bonifaci Calvo
- Bonifaci de Castellana
- Bord del rei d'Arago

== C ==
- Cadenet
- Calega Panzan
- Cantarel
- Carenza
- Castelloza
- Cavaire
- Cercamon
- Certan
- Chardo
- Clara d'Anduza
- Codolet
- Coine (Note: Wrote the French part of a bilingual tenso with Raimbaut de Vaqueiras.)
- Coms de Blandra
- Coms de Bretaigna
- Coms de Foix
- Coms de Rodes
- Coms de Toloza
- Comtessa de Dia
- Comtessa de Proensa
- Cossezen

== D ==
- Dalfi d'Alvernha
- Dalfinet
- Dante Alighieri (Note: Only wrote troubadour verse within the Divine Comedy.)
- Dante da Maiano
- Daude de Carlus
- Daude de Pradas
- Duran Sartor de Paernas

== E ==
- Eble de Saignas
- Eble de Ventadorn
- Eble d'Ussel
- Elias Cairel
- Elias de Barjols
- Elias d'Ussel
- Elias Fonsalada
- Elias de Rosegnols
- Engenim d'Urre de Valentinès
- Engles
- Envejos
- Escaronha de l'Isla Jordan
- Escudier de la Ilha
- Esquileta
- Esteve
- Estornel

== F ==
- Felip Engles
- Felip de Valenza
- Ferrari de Ferrara
- Folquet de Lunel
- Folquet de Marselha
- Folquet de Romans
- Formit de Perpignan
- Fortunier
- Frederic de Sicilia

== G ==
- Galaubet
- Garcia Meendiz d'Eixo
- Garin d'Apchier
- Garin lo Brun
- Gasquet
- Gaucelm Estaca
- Gaucelm Faidit
- Gaudairenca
- Gausbert Amiel
- Gausbert de Puicibot
- Gauseran de Saint Leidier
- Gavaudan
- Gilabert de Próixita
- Girard Cavalaz
- Gormonda de Monpeslier
- Granet
- Grimoart Gausmar
- Gui de Cavaillo
- Gui de Glotos
- Gui d'Ussel
- Guibert
- Guigo de Cabanas
- Guigo de Saint Didier
- Guillalmet
- Guillalmi
- Guillelmi
- Guilhelma de Rosers
- Guilhem Ademar
- Guilhem Anelier de Tolosa
- Guilhem Augier de Grassa
- Guilhem Augier Novella
- Guilhem d'Anduza
- Guilhem d'Autpol
- Guilhem de Balaun
- Guilhem de Berguedan
- Guilhem de Biars
- Guilhem de Cabestaing
- Guilhem de Dosfraires
- Guilhem de Durfort
- Guilhem de Gap
- Guilhem de la Tor
- Guilhem de l'Olivier
- Guilhem de Montanhagol
- Guilhem de Mur
- Guilhem de Peiteus
- Guilhem de Ribas
- Guilhem de Saint Gregori
- Guilhem de Saint Leidier
- Guilhem del Baus
- Guilhem d'Ieiras
- Guilhem Fabre
- Guilhem Figueira
- Guilhem Magret
- Guilhem Peire Cazals de Caortz
- Guilhem Raimon
- Guilhem Raimon de Gironela
- Guilhem Rainier
- Guilhem Rainol d'At
- Guilhem Uc d'Albi
- Guillem de Masdovelles
- Guiraudo lo Ros
- Guiraut de Bornelh
- Guiraut de Cabreira
- Guiraut de Calanso
- Guiraut de Salignac
- Guiraut d'Espaigna
- Guiraut del Luc
- Guiraut Riquier
- Guossalbo Roitz

== I ==
- Isarn Marques
- Isarn Rizol
- Iseut de Capio
- Iznart d'Entrevenas

== J ==
- Jacme (II) d'Arago
- Jacme Escriva
- Jacme Grils
- Jacme Mote d'Arle
- Jacme Rovira
- Jaufre de Foixa
- Jaufre de Pon
- Jaufre de Pons
- Jaufre Reforzat de Trets
- Jaufre Rudel
- Javare
- Joan Aguila
- Joan d'Albuzo
- Joan Blanch
- Joan de Castellnou
- Joan de Pennas
- Joan Esteve de Bezers
- Joan Lag
- Joan Miralhas
- Johanet d'Albusson
- Jordan Bonel de Confolens
- Jordan de Born
- Jordan de l'Isla de Venessi
- Jordan, senher de la Yla
- Jori
- Joyos de Tolosa
- Jutge

== K ==
- Karles, coms de Proensa

== L ==
- Lanfranc Cigala
- Lantelm
- Lantelmet de l'Aguillo
- Lanza Marques
- Lemozi
- Lisa de Londres
- Lombarda
- Lorenz Mallol
- Luca Grimaldi
- Luchetz Gateluz

== M ==
- Mainart Ros
- Marcabru
- Marcoat
- Maria de Ventadorn
- Marques de Canilhac
- Matfre Ermengau
- Matheu
- Matieu de Caersi
- Miquel de Castillon
- Miquel de la Tor
- Mir Bernart
- Monge
- Monge de Foissan
- Monge de Montaudon
- Montan
- Montan Sartre

== N ==
- Nicolet de Turin
- Nompar

== O ==
- Obs de Biguli
- Olivier de la Mar
- Olivier lo Templier
- Osmondo da Verona
- Oste
- Ot de Montcada
- Ozil de Cadartz

== P ==
- Palaizi
- Paul Lanfranc
- Paulet de Marselha
- Paves
- Peire Basc
- Peire Bonasa
- Peire Bremon lo Tort
- Peire Bremon Ricas Novas
- Peire Camor
- Peire Cardenal
- Peire Catala
- Peire de Cols d'Aorlac
- Peire d'Alvernha
- Peire (II) d'Arago
- Peire (III) d'Arago
- Peire de Barjac
- Peire de Bragairac
- Peire de Bussignac
- Peire de Castelnou
- Peire de Cazals
- Peire de Corbiac
- Peire de Durban
- Peire de Gavaret
- Peire de la Caravana
- Peire de la Mula
- Peire de Ladils
- Peire de Maensac
- Peire de Monzo
- Peire de Rius
- Peire d'Estanh
- Peire de Valeira
- Peire del Pol
- Peire del Vern
- Peire del Vilar
- Peire Duran
- Peire d'Ussel
- Peire Ermengau
- Peire Espanhol
- Peire Gauseran
- Peire Guilhem de Luserna
- Peire Guilhem de Tolosa
- Peire Imbert
- Peire Laroque
- Peire Lunel de Montech
- Peire Milo
- Peire Pelet
- Peire Pelissier
- Peire Raimon de Tolosa
- Peire Rogier
- Peire Salvatge
- Peire Torat
- Peire Trabustal
- Peire Vidal
- Peirol
- Peironet
- Pelardit
- Pelestort
- Perseval Doria
- Perdigon
- Pistoleta
- Pomariol
- Pons Barba
- Pons de Capduelh
- Pons de la Garda
- Pons de Monlaur
- Pons d'Ortafas
- Pons Fabre d'Uzes
- Pons Huc d'Empuria
- Pons Santolh
- Ponson
- Porcier
- Pouzet
- Prebost de Limotges
- Prebost de Valensa
- Pujol

== R ==
- Raimbaudet
- Raimbaut (III) d'Aurenga
- Raimbaut (IV) d'Aurenga
- Raimbaut de Beljoc
- Raimbaut d'Eira
- Raimbaut de Vaqueiras
- Raimon Berenguier de Proensa
- Raimon Bistortz d'Arle
- Raimon d'Anjou
- Raimon d'Avinhon
- Raimon de Castelnou
- Raimon de Cornet
- Raimon de Durfort
- Raimon de las Salas
- Raimon de Miravalh
- Raimon de Rusillon
- Raimon de Tors de Marseilha
- Raimon Ermengau
- Raimon Escrivan
- Raimon Estaca
- Raimon Feraut
- Raimon Gaucelm de Bezers
- Raimon Guilhem
- Raimon Izarn
- Raimon Jordan
- Raimon Menudet
- Raimon Rigaut
- Raimon Vidal de Bezaudun
- Rainaut de Pons
- Rainaut de Tres Sauzes
- Ramberti de Buvalel
- Reculaire
- Ricau de Tarascon
- Ricaut Bonomel
- Richartz, reis dels Engles (Note: One poem attributed to him is found in both French and Occitan versions.)
- Rigaut de Berbezilh
- Rodrigo
- Rofian
- Romeu de Vilanova
- Rostaing Berenguier
- Rostanh de Merguas
- Rubaut

== S ==
- Sail d'Escola
- Savaric de Malleo
- Scot
- Serveri de Girona
- Sifre
- Simon Doria
- Sordel

== T ==
- Taurel
- Thomas Periz de Fozes
- Tibaut de Blizon
- Tibors de Sarenom
- Tomas
- Tomier
- Torcafol
- Tremoleta
- Tribolet
- Trobaire de Villa-Arnaut
- Trufarel
- Turc Malec

== U ==
- Uc Brunet
- Uc Catola
- Uc de la Bacalaria
- Uc de Lescura
- Uc de Mataplana
- Uc de Murel
- Uc de Pena
- Uc de Saint Circ

== V ==
- Vaquier
- Vescoms de Torena
- Vesques de Basaz
- Vesques de Clarmon

== Y ==
- Ysabella
- Yselda

== See also ==
- List of Galician-Portuguese troubadours
- List of Minnesänger
- List of trouvères

== Sources ==
- Bertoni, Giulio (1967) [1915]. I Trovatori d'Italia: Biografie, testi, tradizioni, note. Società Multigrafica Editrice Somu.
- Guida, Saverio; Larghi, Gerardo (2014). Dizionario Biografico dei Trovatori. Mucchi Editore.
- Guida, Saverio (2016). "Trovatori non censiti o mal censiti nel Dizionario Biografico dei Trovatori". Romance Philology. 70 (1): 83–102. doi:10.1484/j.rph.5.110361.
- Paden, William D. (2018). "The Lives of the Troubadours". Romance Philology. 72 (1): 111–124. JSTOR 26499781.
- Riquer, Martín de (1975). Los trovadores: historia literaria y textos. Editorial Planeta.
- Taylor, Robert A. (2015). A Bibliographical Guide to the Study of Troubadours and Old Occitan Literature. Medieval Institute Publications.
