= Homosexuality in medieval Europe =

Gay and lesbian sexuality in medieval Europe

In medieval Europe, attitudes toward homosexuality varied from region to region, determined by religious culture. The Catholic Church, which dominated the religious landscape, considered any non-procreative sex to be sodomy, which they viewed as a mortal sin and "unnatural". However, the actual sexual behaviors of ordinary people outside of recorded marriages is harder to track archivally, since the historical record includes few details about their lives. Male homosexuality, labeled "sodomy," was widely criminalized in medieval Europe and therefore can be traced to a degree via interactions with the legal system. The emergence of heretical groups, such as the Cathars and Waldensians, was met with a rise in allegations of unnatural sexual conduct against these groups' members as part of the war against heresy in Christendom. Accusations of sodomy and "unnatural acts" were leveled against the Order of the Knights Templar in 1307 as part of Philip IV of France's attempt to suppress the order. These allegations have been dismissed by some scholars. At the same time as this heavy criminalization and stigmatization of same-sex relations between men, however, medieval theologians may have "failed to conceptualize" same-sex relations between women as sex at all, leading to a smaller number of clear records of medieval lesbianism.

== Theology ==
Although homosexuality was not considered a major offense during the early Roman Empire, homosexual encounters and homosexual behavior came to be viewed as unacceptable as Christianity developed. The Hebrew Bible (Leviticus 18:22, 20:13, Deuteronomy 22:5) condemned females who wore male attire, males who wore female attire, and the New Testament condemned males that engaged in homosexual intercourse. In the 11th century the Benedictine monk and cardinal Peter Damian wrote the Liber Gomorrhianus, an extended attack on both homosexuality and masturbation. He portrayed homosexuality as a counter-rational force undermining morality, religion, and society itself, and in need of strong suppression lest it spread even and especially among clergy.

Hildegard of Bingen, born seven years after the death of St. Peter Damian, reported seeing visions and recorded them in Scivias (short for Scito vias Domini, "Know the Ways of the Lord"). In Book II Vision Six, she quotes God as condemning same-sex intercourse, including lesbianism; "a woman who takes up devilish ways and plays a male role in coupling with another woman is most vile in My sight, and so is she who subjects herself to such a one in this evil deed".

In the 13th century, the theologian Thomas Aquinas was influential in linking condemnations of homosexuality with the idea of natural law, arguing that "special sins are against nature, as, for instance, those that run counter to the intercourse of male and female natural to animals, and so are peculiarly qualified as unnatural vices." This view points from the natural to the Divine, because (following Aristotle) he said all people seek happiness; but according to Aquinas, happiness can only finally be attained through the beatific vision. Therefore, all sins are also against the natural law. However, the natural law of many aspects of life is knowable apart from special revelation by examining the forms and purposes of those aspects. It is in this sense that Aquinas considered homosexuality unnatural since it involves a kind of partner other than the kind to which the purpose of sexuality points. Indeed, he considered it second only to bestiality as an abuse of sexuality.

== Early Christian medieval views ==
Around 400, Christianity began to introduce a new sexual code focused on the religious concepts of holiness and "purity". The emerging Church, which gained social and political sway by the mid-third century, had two approaches to sexuality. One of these, like their Greco-Roman predecessors, did not view or judge sexuality in terms of heterosexual or homosexual acts. Instead, it only judged the act itself, and promoted a sex life that mainly focused on platonic relationships. For instance, the Roman tradition of forming a legal union with another male by declaring a "brother" persisted during the early medieval years. Also, though there was no official marriage within religious communities, long-lasting relationships or bonds were made. Also, there are many poems from that century that suggest the existence of lesbian relationships.

== Punishment in medieval times ==
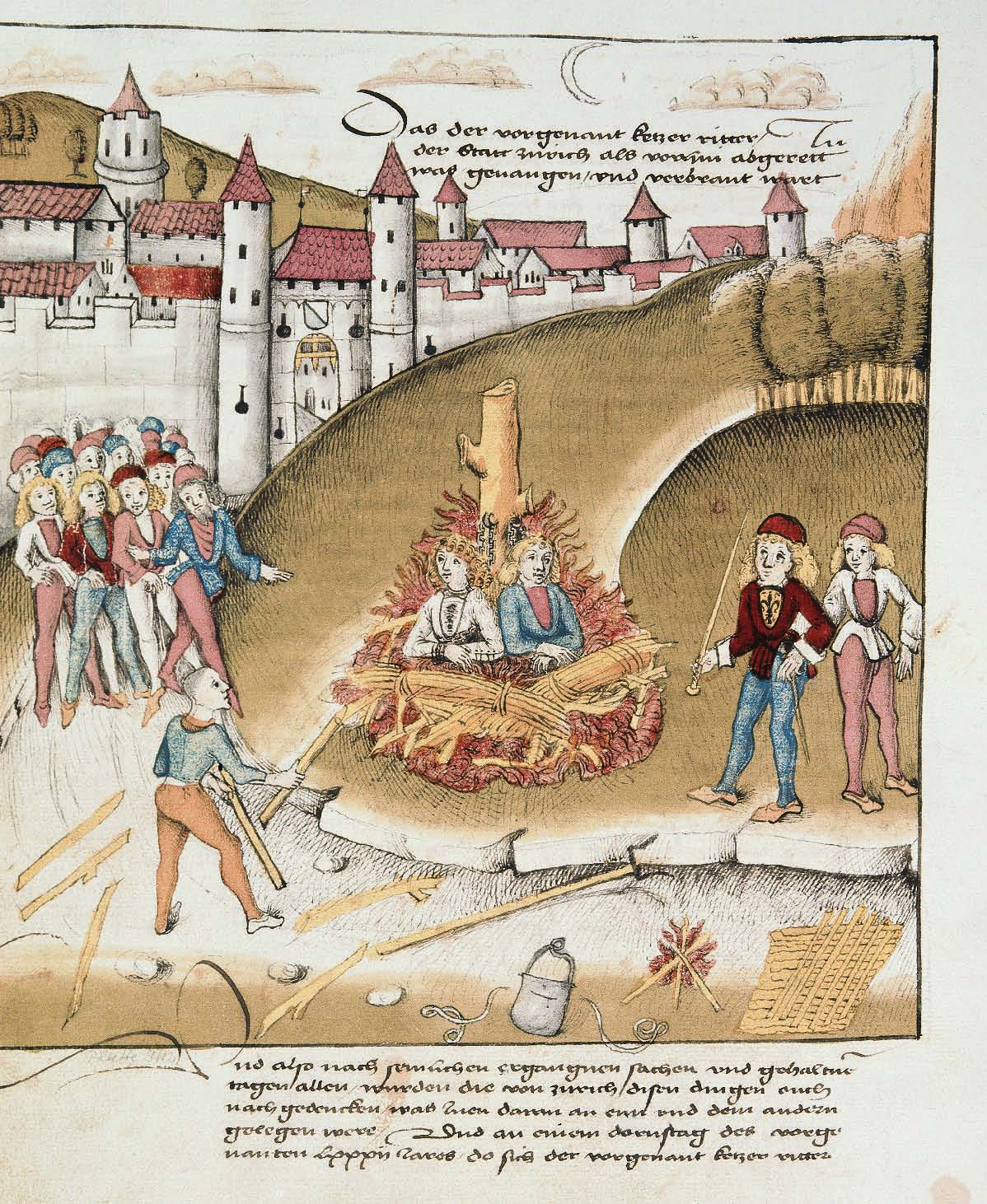
Two males, Richard Puller von Hohenburg and Anton Mätzler, accused of sodomy burned at the stake, Zürich 1482

By the end of the Middle Ages, most of the Catholic churchmen and states accepted and lived with the belief that sexual behavior was, according to natural law, reserved for procreation, considering purely sterile sexual acts (i.e., oral and anal sex, as well as masturbation) sinful. However, homosexual acts held a special place as crimes against natural law. Most civil law codes had punishments for such "unnatural acts", especially in regions that were heavily influenced by the Church's teachings.

In the early medieval years, homosexuality was given no particular penance; it was viewed like all the other sins. For example, during the eighth century, Pope Gregory III gave penances of 160 days for unnatural female acts and usually one year for males who committed acts of sodomy, the passive partner being treated more severely. During the Inquisition itself, individuals were rarely investigated for sodomy alone; it was usually associated with the expression of heretical beliefs and attacks on the Church. Those who did not recant their heresy would be severely punished. Officials saw a break in moral and religious views because of homosexuality. Thus, it was seen as a pagan view; those considered guilty would be charged with capital punishment.

The Papal restoratio of the 11th century led to increasingly harsher attitudes towards sodomites. The Council of Nablus in 1120, in the Kingdom of Jerusalem, enacted severe penalties for sodomy in the aftermath of the defeat of the Antiochene army at the Field of Blood the year before. In the 13th century France, sodomy resulted in castration on the first offense, dismemberment on the second, and burning on the third. Lesbian behavior was punished with specific mutilations for the first two offenses and burning on the third as well. By the mid-14th century, in many cities of Italy, civil laws against sodomy were common. If a person was found to have committed sodomy, the city's government was entitled to confiscate the offender's property.

By 1533, Henry VIII had enacted the death penalty for sodomy with the Buggery Act 1533, which became the basis for many anti-sodomy laws. This also led to the fact that although the Renaissance traced its origins to ancient Greece, none of the literary masters dared to publicly proclaim "males' love".

== Art ==
In the subject of homosexuality in medieval Europe, art is one of the least studied aspects when researching the matter. As Constantine legalized Christianity in the fourth century, the religion became widespread through medieval Europe over the centuries leading to less secular subjects to be produced as more energy was used to convert practitioners of pagan religions. This was also in part because from the early to late Middle Ages most art was produced under the church, leading art of the time to have more theological themes. Though this was the case, depictions of homosexuality as sodomy did exist varying in form from region to region, either in forms of damnation by the church or depictions of love mainly through manuscripts and literature.

=== Literature and poetry ===
One of the earliest documented mentions of medieval sodomy comes from the 10th century. From poet German Roswitha of Gandersheim/Hrotsvitha there exist the Passio S. Pelagic, in which homosexuality as sodomy is dictated a practice of foreign lands, Arabic to be precise. Within its content, championed was the Christian protagonist, Pelagius, for sticking to his faith against pursuits of the caliph of Cordoba, Abderrahmann, denying his embrace and becoming a martyr. Other literature of this time exist as well, such as De Lantfrido et Cobbone, a Latin work corroborating the idea of homosexuality/sodomy as a pagan and pre-Christian ideals and also one of the first depictions of bisexuality within literature.

Placed within the poetry of the 11th and 12th century of the medieval world laid a contradiction to the damnation of homoeroticism of the church. As Latin was pushed into practice in the French realm, the poetry produced in this time had elements of homosexuality and Christianity. Most notable of this genre are the works of three bishops, Marbodius of Rennes, Baudri of Bourgueil and Hildebert of Lavardin. These are notable works due to the position of the three men as they were men of the church, bishops to be specific. Marbod's work as it has been studied has been found to have the most homoerotic and explicit themes, though he has been found on record denying such accusation citing his writing as more metaphorical.

The depiction of homosexuality in art saw a rise in the Late Middle Ages, beginning with the Renaissance of the twelfth century, when Latin and Greek influences were revitalized in Europe. Influenced by Roman depictions of homoerotic love, these "neo-Latin" poets portrayed male love in a positive light, while avoiding explicitly mentioning homosexuality, which was still a taboo topic. An example is the poet Marbodius of Rennes, who wrote of male beauty and desire:

A handsome face demands a good mind and a yielding one... this flesh is so smooth, so milky, so unblemished, so good, so slippery, so handsome, so tender. Yet the time will come... when this flesh, dear boyish flesh, will be worthless... be not slow to yield to an eager lover.

Poetry about homosexual acts in medieval Europe has lately received quite a bit of scholarly attention, although the difference in language and euphemisms between medieval and modern times often complicates interpretations.

One example of a piece of writing that did describe homosexual acts in critical terms was "Le Livre des Manières". Written by Étienne de Fougères between 1173 and 1178, his poems contrast the "beauty" of heterosexual sex to the "vile", unnatural homosexual sex. Seven of the stanzas focus specifically on lesbian sex acts:

"They do their jousting act in couples
and go at it full tilt;
at the game of thigh-fencing
they lewdly share their expenses.

They're not all from the same mold:
one lies still and the other makes busy,
one plays the cock and the other the hen
and each one plays her role".

Noteworthy here, according to Sahar Amer, is that every stanza seems to decry the lack of a penis; Robert Clark Aldo notes "the ever-present but always absent phallus". Amer also notes that the author may well have leaned on Arab treatises about sexuality, for metaphors and specific words pertaining to lesbian sexual activity.

=== Illuminated manuscripts ===
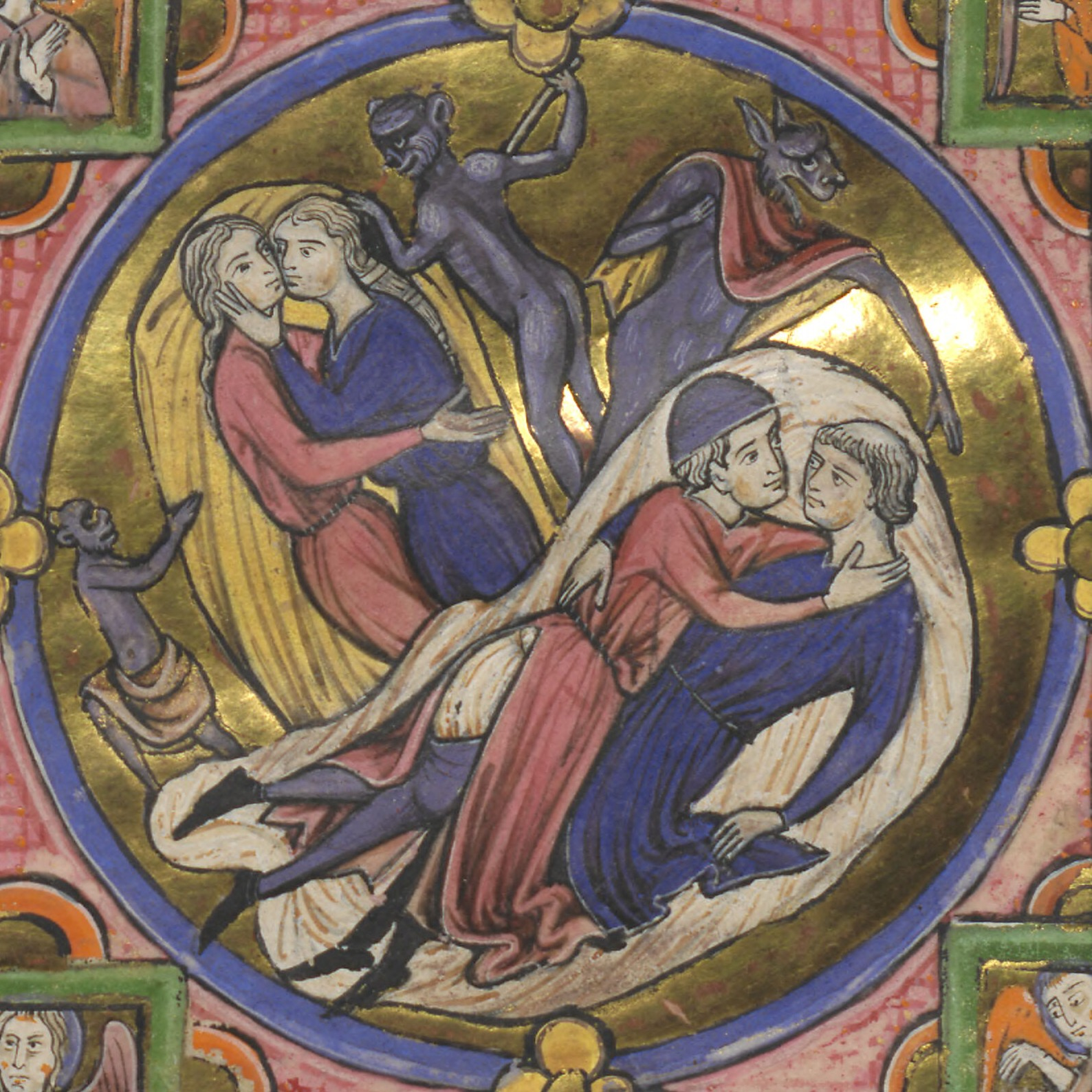
Bible moralisée ('moralized bibles')

As more depictions of sodomy became prevalent, there came about a form of writing that interlaced the writing of homosexual love and biblical texts. These became known as "moralized" texts. This form of writing was typically accompanied by illuminated manuscripts, which led to them being more costly and also just as rare. Typically commissioned by someone of royal status, they existed as a reinventing of the ancient literary text of the Bible and Greek literature. Within this, they are translated and the context is reinvented to fit the morals of Christianity in the thirteenth and fourteenth centuries. The most famous of these being the Bible moralisée which features manuscript illustrations in circles to show which moral it stands for. Paired with this was the Ovide moralisée, used to change feelings against previous pagan literature. With this in mind, typically works within them that portrayed homosexual love were then reinvented to instead condemn the happening inside of the manuscript. Within the Ovide Moralisée, a text on Jupiter and Ganymede is instead used to condemn sodomy, though its actual meaning was to show the story of Ganymede becoming the cup-bearer of the gods.

== Lesbianism ==
=== Background ===
Sexuality in the Middle Ages was male-centered and revolved around the idea that a penis was required to have fulfilling sexual activity. The lack of attention paid to lesbianism in the Middle Ages can stem from this belief, that as long as a dildo or other penis-shaped object was not used in lesbian relationships, then the relationship was not considered fully sexual.

=== Religious ===
Many of the writings that deal with lesbianism in medieval Europe come from religious texts. The earliest text that shows the Church's disapproval of lesbianism comes from the writings of St. Paul to the Romans. In his letters, he states: "women exchanged natural relations for unnatural, and the men likewise gave up natural relations with women and were consumed with passion for one another…and receiving in their own persons the due penalty for their error."

While Paul does not explicitly describe lesbian relations between women, he does state that this is an unholy choice made and that women who commit these "unnatural" acts will be punished, presumably by God's will. This is one of the earliest descriptions of lesbianism that details how early Church leaders felt about what were described as "unnatural" relations. The mentality of the church regarding lesbianism was also seen in the rise of penitentials. Penitentials were guides used by religious leaders and laypersons in dealing with issues in a broader community. While discussion of dealing with lesbianism was not mentioned in these penitentials, it was an overall concept that lesbian relations was a smaller sin than male homosexuality.

One such penitential that mentions the consequences for lesbian activity was the Paenitentiale Theodori, attributed to Theodore of Tarsus (the eighth Archbishop of Canterbury). There are three main canons that are mentioned in regards to female homosexuality: 12. If a woman practices vice with a woman, she shall do penance for three years. 13. If she practices solitary vice, she shall do penance for the same period. 14. The penance of a widow and of a girl is the same. She who has a husband deserves a greater penalty if she commits fornication.

According to his canons, Theodore sees lesbian activities as a minor sin, as fornication is considered, rather than a more serious sexual sin like adultery. Unmarried women and girls were judged less severely because they had a single status and did not have another form of sexual release. Married women, who had willing sexual partners in their husbands, were judged more harshly because they sought sexual satisfaction through an "unnatural" form. Religious figures throughout the twelfth and thirteenth centuries continued to ignore the concept of lesbianism but in St. Thomas Aquinas' Summa Theologiae discusses in his subject of lust that female homosexuality falls under one of the four categories of unnatural acts.

=== Medicine and science ===
There were two medical situations that were linked to lesbianism in medieval Europe. Once such condition was that the womb of a woman had a buildup of her 'seed' and due to lack of sexual intercourse, this cause the suffocation of the womb. The cure for this suffocation was for a midwife to place hot items on the woman and bring her to orgasm. This would help her to retain the seed of a man. The idea of one woman bringing another woman to orgasm was considered morally wrong by religious leaders and in the thirteenth century, it was urged that marriage was a solution for this problem rather than manual stimulation. The second ailment was ragadia of the womb, in which fleshy growths grew as a result of intercourse or childbirth and these growths could sometimes grow on the outside of the vagina.

=== Secular laws ===
Laws against lesbianism in medieval Europe were not as mainstreamed as laws for male homosexuality. While not as serious, lesbianism still posed a threat to male-centered social order. It was often ignored in secular law but there is one known exception. Written around 1260, the French legal treatise Li Livres de jostice et de plet prescribed that if convicted of sodomy: "The woman who does this shall undergo mutilation (on the first and second) offense and on her third must be burnt." This is one of the only laws that has been known to specify what the consequences were for women who engaged in lesbian sexual activity. By the thirteenth century, lesbianism was equated to sodomy and therefore carried a similar sentence. However, secular courts did not prosecute cases of lesbianism, mainly because laws that would cause it to be brought to court barely existed.

=== Art ===
A single courtly love poem exists, "Na Maria, pretz e fina valors" ("Lady Maria, in your merit and distinction"), written by one Bieiris de Romans and addressed to another woman named Mary, which several scholars have argued is in fact expressing homosexual female love. The issue is heavily debated in scholarship, however, as nothing else is known about Bieiris (Beatrice) other than the poem itself. Some scholars argue that she was writing on behalf of a man, others that she was simply playing with the format and using the same register of affectionate language common in everyday society at the time: the poem never mentions "kissing" Mary but only praising her character, making it unclear if the "love" that Beatrice was expressing was romantic or platonic. A counter-argument made by other scholarship is that the very fact Beatrice chose to use a poetic format so traditionally used to express romantic love means she must have known it would be understood as expressing a romantic context.
