= Isarn (troubadours) =

There were three troubadours named Isarn or Izarn, and who are difficult to distinguish completely today. The first has no surname and composed two partimens with Rofian (or Rofin) around 1240. He has been confounded with the inquisitor Isarn.

Isarn Marques (or Marquès) wrote a canso addressed to either Alfonso VIII or Alfonso X of Castile, entitled S'ieu fos. It may have been composed around 1250. It has the same metre and rhyme scheme as were used in poems by Aimeric de Sarlat, Elias d'Ussel, Henry II of Rodez, Gaucelm Faidit, Lanfranc Cigala, At de Mons, Peire Cardenal, Raimbaut de Vaqueiras, Maria de Ventadorn, and an anonymous composer.

Isarn Rizol (or Rizolz) wrote a canso dated to around 1250.
