= Peire de Cols d'Aorlac =

Peire's song in chansonnier C

Peire de Cols d'Aorlac (in French, Pierre de Cère de Cols) was a troubadour from the Cantal.

Cols is a hamlet of Vic-sur-Cère, near Aurillac (Aorlac). Peire's dates are uncertain. His biography is almost wholly unknown, including whether he was a layman or cleric. The Duc de La Salle de Rochemaure identified him as either a brother or an uncle of Guillaume de Cère, canon of Clermont, and Jean de Cère, who in 1279 did homage to Count Henry II of Rodez for their shared lordship in Vic. This would make him a distant relative of the troubadour Peire Rogier.

There is a single poem attributed to him, but the attribution is open to doubt. Si co.l soleills nobles per gran clardat is a canso (love song). It is preserved in the three troubadour chansonniers C, α and f. In the first two it is attributed to Peire, but in the last it is attributed to Rigaut de Berbezilh. The former attribution is more likely but the style of the poem is very similar to Rigaut's. Amelia Van Vleck writes that "imitation [of Rigaut] shades into adaptation". One of Rigaut's modern editors, Alberto Varvaro, speculates that the poem was written by Rigaut but "made the property" of Peire de Cols, possibly his jongleur. This would put Peire's activity in the mid-12th century.

Si co.l soleills contains the earliest references to the legend of the salamander in European poetry. Peire likens himself to the salamander, "which is happy in fire and blaze", because the erotic desire inside of him is more pleasing the more it burns. Although claims about the salamander's imperviousness to fire go back to classical authors, the first author to claim that the salamander enjoyed being in fire was Augustine of Hippo. Peire's salamander simile may have inspired the Tuscan poet Bondie Dietaiuti. Besides comparing himself to a salamander, he compares love itself to the sun and his lover to a gyrfalcon.

The Duc de La Salle de Rochemaure translated the poem into French.
