= Rambertino Buvalelli =

Italian composer

Rambertino as depicted in chansonnier A

Rambertino di Guido Buvalelli (1170 or 1180 – September 1221), a Bolognese judge, statesman, diplomat, and poet, was the earliest of the podestà-troubadours of thirteenth-century Lombardy. He served at one time or other as podestà of Brescia, Milan, Parma, Mantua, Genoa, and Verona. Ten of his Occitan poems survive, but none with an accompanying melody. He is usually regarded as the first native Italian troubadour, though Cossezen and Peire de la Caravana may precede him. His reputation has secured a street named in his honour in his birthplace: the Via Buvalelli Rambertino in Bologna.

== Political career ==
Rambertino was a law student at the University of Bologna in his youth and became attached to the Este court not long after. It was there that he made the acquaintance of Beatrice d'Este, whom he celebrates in all his songs. He was patronised by Azzo VI and he had strong ties to the Guelph party in Italy. He first appears as podestà of Brescia in 1201, when the Annales Brixienses ("Annals of Brescia") record that receptus est Rembertinus potestas ("Rambertino was received as podestà"). He made peace that year with Cremona, Bergamo, and Mantua. In 1203 he was again in Bologna, serving as a procurator, his term in Brescia having ended. The next five years are obscure from a distance of eight hundred, but he was podestà of Milan in 1208. He appears in Milanese documents as Lambertinus Bonarelus and Lambertinus de Bonarellis, but there is no doubt among historians that they are references to the troubadour.

In 1209 Rambertino was back in Bologna, where he was console di giustizia ("consul of justice"). In 1212 he was serving as ambassador for Pope Innocent IV's cardinal-legate Gerardo da Sesso, soon to be Bishop of Vercelli, to Modena, but by May he had returned to Bologna. A Buvalello was procurator of Bologna again in 1212, though it is a myth that Rambertino was involved in a property dispute involving Sambuca during the guerrilla between Pistoia and Bologna that year. He was podestà of Parma in 1213. He resumed the office of consul in Bologna in 1214 and swore to uphold the league between Bologna and Reggio nell'Emilia that year. Rambertino was podestà at Mantua between 1215 and 1216, his longest term yet. In 1217 he was elected to the podesteria of Modena, to which he had formerly served briefly on an embassy. In 1218 Rambertino was named to the podesteria of Genoa and he held it for three consecutive years through 1220. It was probably in his three years at Genoa that he introduced Occitan lyric poetry to the city, which was later to develop a flourishing Occitan literary culture.

Rambertino was again offered the podesteria of Modena in 1221 but refused it because of a papal injunction of Honorius III. In that very year he was named podestà of Verona, a post he accepted, but he died in September. His obituary reads: MCCXXI. Hoc de mense septembris obit dominus Lambertus Buvalelli potestas Verone.

== Poetic career ==
Rambertino probably learned Occitan by reading anthologies (chansonniers) rather than through contact with other troubadours. His poetry, modest in volume, is skilled and the poet utilised difficult rhyme schemes and alliteration. Rambertino's technical proficiency is evident and his language is unadulterated by Italianisms. As one of the earliest Italian troubadours, it is perhaps unsurprising that he stuck with the theme of courtly love and wrote only cansos. He did have contact with other troubadours, notably Elias Cairel, whom at the end of Toz m'era de chantar gequiz he asks to bring the poem to Beatrice at the Este court. And perhaps it was Rambertino's deft treatment of love that prompted Peire Raimon de Tolosa to address his De fin'amor son tuit mei pessamen, described as "one of the finest descriptions of fin'amor ever written", to him.

== Works ==
The beginning of Rambertino's D'un saluz uoill m'entremetre, with a decorated initial D, and Rambertino's name (Lanbertin de Buualel) at top.

Rambertino's surviving poems are listed alphabetically:

- Al cor m'estai l'amorous desirers
- D'un salut me voill entremetre
- Er quant florisson li verger
- Eu sai la flor plus bella d'autra flor
- Ges de chantar nom voill gequir
- Mout chantera de ioi e voluntiers
- Pois vei quel temps s'aserena
- S'a mon Restaur pognes plazer
- Seigner, scel qi la putia
- Toz m'era de chantar gequiz

== Sources ==
- Bertoni, Giulio. I Trovatori d'Italia: Biografie, testi, tradizioni, note. Rome: Società Multigrafica Editrice Somu, 1967 [1915].
- Brand, Peter, and Pertile, Lino. The Cambridge History of Italian Literature. Cambridge: Cambridge University Press, 1999. ISBN 0-521-43492-0.
- Cabré, Miriam. "Italian and Catalan troubadours" (pp. 127–140). The Troubadours: An Introduction. Simon Gaunt and Sarah Kay, edd. Cambridge: Cambridge University Press, 1999. ISBN 0-521-57473-0.
- Field, W. H. W. Review of Le poesie by Rambertino Buvalelli, ed. Elio Melli. In Speculum, 56:2 (Apr., 1981), pp. 362–366.
- Keller, Hans-Erich. "Italian Troubadours." A Handbook of the Troubadours edd. F. R. P. Akehurst and Judith M. Davis. Berkeley: University of California Press, 1995. ISBN 0-520-07976-0.
- Ragni, E. "Buvalelli, Rambertino (Lambertino)." Dizionario Biografico degli Italiani, Vol. XV. Rome: Società Grafica Romana, 1972.
