= Rostanh de Merguas =

French troubadour and poet

Rostanh (or Rostaing) de Merguas (or Mergas) was a minor late thirteenth-century Provençal troubadour from the Vaucluse. He may be the troubadour described in the table of contents of chansonnier C, a fourteenth-century Occitan manuscript, as an escudier de la Ylha (squire of l'Isle-sur-la-Sorgue). He is ascribed one canso. He was at one point assigned the song Non sai cal conseilh mi prenda, but this is the work of Cadenet. Rostanh is called de Melies in the rubric of chansonnier H.
