= Peire de Castelnou (troubadour) =

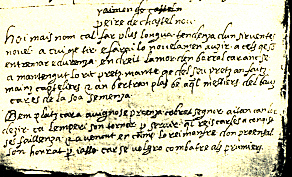
Oimais no·m cal far plus long'atendensa is found only in one 16th-century chansonnier.

Peire de Castelnou (also Castelnau or Chasselnou, French: Pierre de Châteauneuf) was a minor troubadour from Provence. He was a client of the lords of Baux. His one surviving piece, Oimais no·m cal far plus long'atendensa, is a sirventes ("soldier's song") written after either the Battle of Benevento (1266) or the Battle of Tagliacozzo (1268). He favoured the Angevin cause in Italy.

Peire wrote that Raymond Berengar IV of Provence had kept the troubadour Sordello close to him.

== Sources ==
- Asperti, Stefano. "I trovatori e la corona d'Aragona. Riflessioni per una cronologia di riferimento." Mot so razo, 1:1999, pp. 12–31.
- Jeanroy, Alfred. La poésie lyrique des troubadours. Toulouse: Privat, 1934.
- Bartholomeis ( de ) Vincenzo. "Poesie Provenzali". Istituto storiche. 1931.
- Bertoni Giulio. I trovatori d'Italia. Slatkine reprints. 1915.
- Gioffredo Pietro. Storia delle Alpi Maritimi.Stamperia Reale.1629/1692.
- Martel Jean Baptiste. Histoire de Chateauneuf Villevielle. Edition Gasparini-Brun. 1928.
- Neufville ( de ) Olivier et Vony. Pierre de Chateauneuf dit : Peire de Casternou, troubadour. Edition Olivier de Neufville. 2021.
- Nostredame (de) Jehan. Vie des anciens poètes provençaux. Champion edition. 1575.
