= Duran Sartor de Paernas =

Duran Sartor de Paernas or Duran Sartre de Carpentras (fl. c. 1210–50) was a Provençal troubadour from Pernes near Carpentras. The nickname sartor means "tailor". Two sirventes have been attributed to him, both reflect opposition to the royal crusade in Occitania: "Vil sirventes leugier e venassal" was written towards 1210, certainly before 1220, and "En talent ai qu'un sirventes encoc," which was written in 1242, during the Saintonge War. Although Duran criticises the crusade against alleged heretics, he encourages further efforts at crusading against Muslims.

The first poem has been described as "bitter" and "anti-aristocratic" in tone. The author has been identified with the Provençal nobleman Peire Duran de Velorgues, despite the fact that the latter could not have been a tailor. In one manuscript this sirventes is assigned to Peire Bremon Ricas Novas, an attribution not generally accepted. One manuscript names Duran as the composer of the sirventes "Gerr'e trebailh vei et afan", usually attributed to Bertran de Born, his son or Guigo de Cabanes.

In the second poem, Duran attacks Louis IX of France, James I of Aragon and Henry III of England, the latter for his failure to come to the aid of Count Raymond VII of Toulouse, standard-bearer of the Occitan cause.

En talent ai qu’un sirventes encoc per traire e cels q’an mes Pretz a deroc, qar mantenon "No" e han faidit "Hoc": e menz q’ieu ai arbalesta e croc, brocarai lai per traire al major loc, al rei emgleis, qes hom ten per badoc, qar suefr’aunitz q’om del sieu lo descoc; per q’en cor ai qe als primiers lo toc	I wish to fit a sirventes to the bowstring to shoot those who have laid Honour low, for they favour No and have banished Yes; as long as I have an arbalest and rest, I will spur [my horse] to shoot at the highest place, at the English king who is considered a fool; for in his dishonour he allows men to spoil him for goods; and therefore I wish him to be struck first.

Another sirventes, "Coms de Tolsan, ja non er qu'ie.us o pliva", composed by Montan Sartre according to the rubric, has been assigned to Duran Sartor by some authors. It was composed during the siege of Toulouse (1217–18) and encourages Count Raymond VI of Toulouse to resist the crusading army.

== Sources ==
- Compiled in part from Bibliografia Elettronica dei Trovatori (BEdT), v. 2, published online 1 September 2008. Retrieved 15 June 2013.
