= Pistoleta =

Provençal troubadour

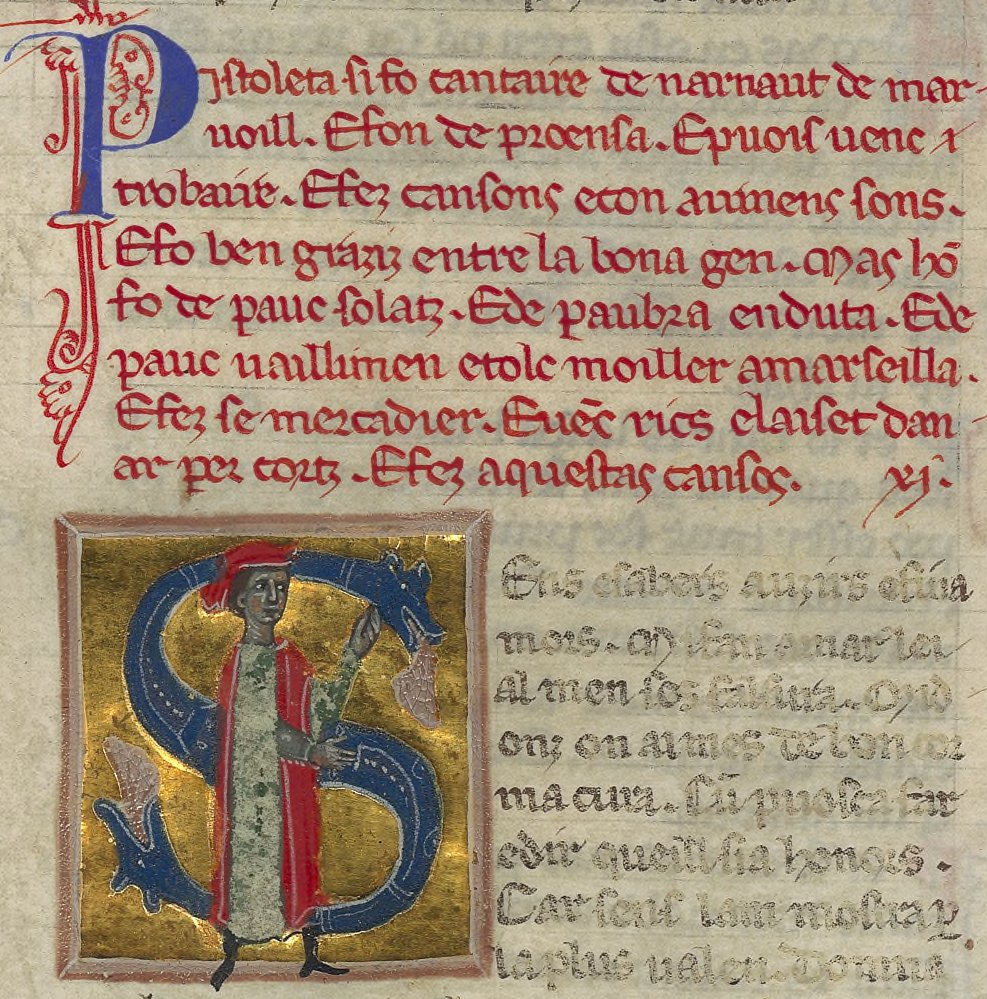
Pistoleta si fo cantaire de narnaut de maruoill. E fon de proensa. . . "Pistoleta was a singer for Sir Arnaut de Maruoill. And he was from Provence. . ." The image of Pistoleta found in the chansonnier is like that of his master, Arnaut; both show them standing in front of an "S" made of two dragons.

Pistoleta (Occitan: [pistuˈlɛtɔ]; fl. 1185–1228) was a Provençal troubadour. His name (actually a nickname) means "little letter (epistle)" in Occitan. He left behind eleven songs, comprising nine cansos and two tensos. Some of his pieces are assigned to an otherwise unknown Jordan de Born in the table of contents of chansonnier C, a fourteenth-century Occitan manuscript.

According to his vida, he was a cantaire (singer) of Arnaut de Maruoill, which probably implies that he was a jongleur who sang Arnaut's songs or perhaps acted as a messenger to bring his songs from one place to another both orally and in writing. He may have carried Arnaut's love songs to the "Countess of Burlatz" (comtessa de Burlats); this would explain his nickname. If the vida be correct about Pistoleta's early career, then he was probably a jongleur from about 1195 or perhaps as early as 1185 and only began his own composing career around 1205.

Five of Pistoleta's songs contain references to the King of Aragon, usually presumed to be Peter II. At some point he became a vassal of Peter's, as he writes in Ai! tan sospir mi venon noit e dia of the reis d'Arragon, de cui ai fait siengnor ("King of Aragon, whom I have made [my] lord"). From this it can be deduced that he spent some time at Peter's court, but he also addressed the king in at least one poem, Anc mais nulhs hom no fon apoderatz, from far away. He is also said to have had relations with Ebles V of Ventadorn, Thomas I of Savoy, and Blacas III of Aulps. In his youth he may have travelled into Limousin and Languedoc and met Maria de Ventadorn, Ebles' wife. He composed a tenso with the latter, which has been dated to late 1228, making it his last known work and the only known work by Maria.

Sometime after October 1214 Pistoleta wrote Ses chantars fos grazitz, which was something of a planh, since it mourns the passing of Peter II and Alfonso VIII of Castile in 1213 and 1214 respectively:

Pueis lo reis d'Aragon muric ni.l reis N'Anfos, e si per leis non fos cui sobr'altras res blan, non chantera ugan.	Since the king of Aragon and the king Lord Alfonso died, and it will not be for them who above others are pleasant, I will not sing this year.

Sometime after composing this song, probably in Languedoc or Catalonia (Pistoleta implies perhaps visiting Perpignan), where Peter and Alfonso were frequently active, Pistoleta returned east of the Rhône to Provence. Probably about this time he travelled into Savoy, where he met Thomas I. It was also during this period in Provence that he met and debated with Blacas sometime after 1220, for he mentions the emperaire (emperor) Frederick II who was crowned in 1220 and became suzerain of Provence that year.

Though Pistoleta's biographer implies that "graceful melodies" (avinens sons, lit. pleasing sounds) were typical of his work, only one melody has survived (for his popular and well-preserved sirventes beginning Ar agues eu mil mars de fin argen) and that in two different versions. His composing was very conservative, more so than his master, Arnaut. Though well-esteemed by "high society", he was a poor conversationalist and unpleasant in appearance. He eventually settled down in Marseille, took a wife, and became a merchant, acquiring considerable wealth which allowed him to stop his itinerant "court-hopping". Unfortunately, there is no corroborating documentation for anything contained in Pistoleta's vida.

Pistoleta also wrote two tensos with two trobairitz (female troubadour): Bona domna, un conseill vos deman ("Good lady, I beg you to advise me") with an anonymous lady and the aforementioned piece with Maria de Ventadorn.

== Sources ==
- Aubrey, Elizabeth. The Music of the Troubadours. Indiana University Press, 1996. ISBN 0-253-21389-4.
- Egan, Margarita, ed. and trans. The Vidas of the Troubadours. New York: Garland, 1984. ISBN 0-8240-9437-9.
- Jeanroy, Alfred. La poésie lyrique des troubadours. Toulouse: Privat, 1934.
- Riquer, Martín de. Los trovadores: historia literaria y textos. 3 vol. Barcelona: Planeta, 1975.
