= Alais, Yselda, and Carenza =

Group of medieval poets

Alais and Yselda (or Iselda, from Isold) were two young noble trobairitz, probably sisters or nuns, who wrote an Occitan tenso with an elderly woman named Carenza.

== The poem ==
Their poem begins Na Carenza al bel cors avinen ("Lady Carenza of the lovely, gracious body"), and the first two stanzas were composed by Alais and Yselda. It is the last two stanzas, composed by Carenza, that are the most difficult to interpret. Magda Bogin and Peter Dronke have read the opening line of both her stanzas beginning with the address N'Alais i na Iselda ("Lady Alais and lady Yselda"). There is, however, an alternative interpretation that sees the address as to a "N'Alaisina Iselda". Under this interpretation, there are two, not three, interlocutors in the poem: Carenza and Alaisina Yselda (sometimes Alascina, both diminutives of Alais). Within the poem, in favour of the multiplicity of younger women is the phrase nos doas serors ("we two sisters"), but against it is the continuous use of the first person singular. The poem is preserved amidst a collection of coblas esparsas in only one Italian chansonnier.

== Language and form ==
Whoever wrote it, Na Carenza al bel cors avinen is complex and eludes full comprehension. Bogin went so far as to classify the last four lines of Carenza's part as trobar clus, making it only the second example in trobairitz literature after that of Lombarda. The language is religious in some places (gran penedenza, great penitence) and in others colloquial (las tetinhas, the breasts). Carenza's reference to marriage with Coronat de Scienza ("Crowned with Knowledge") has caused confusion. The obscure phrase is perhaps a Cathar or Gnostic name for Jesus Christ, but perhaps just a colourfully orthodox senhal (signifier) for God. Parallel to the colloquial/religious lexical dichotomy is the general contrast in tenor between the "serious" and "playful" portions of the text. References to Carenza's sagging breasts are balanced by the sisters' earnest plea for answers to their questions about marital decisions.

== Themes ==
According to Bogin, Carenza is advising her interlocutor(s) to avoid earthly marriage and "marry God". Under the interpretation of Pierre Bec, however, Carenza is recommending marriage to an educated cleric, who will appreciate virginity and give her a glorious son (filh glorios). Renat Nelli explains the entire débat as a Cathar exercise in worldly renunciation, while Angelica Rieger treats it as a traditional debate tenso on the value of marriage. Perhaps the most unconventional interpretation has been put forward by Patrician Anderson. Anderson theorises that the piece is a satire of Midons ("milady"), who chooses a convent for vanity's sake (a major point of the sisters' stanzas is the physical toll of marriage on the wife). Carenza therefore represents the virgin, Alais the peasant, and Iselda the noblewoman; together they are "everywoman".

== Context ==
Intertextually, Na Carenza has links with works by Arnaut de Maruelh and with the court of Azalais, the daughter of Raymond V of Toulouse and the wife of Roger II Trencavel. English translations exist by Bogin (1976), Dronke (1984), and Rieger (1992).

== Sources ==
- Bogin, M. (1976) The Women Troubadours. Scarborough: Paddington. ISBN 0-8467-0113-8.
- Bruckner, M. T.; Shepard, L.; and White, S. (1995) Songs of the Women Troubadours. New York: Garland Publishing ISBN 0-8153-0817-5.
- Dronke, Peter (1984) Women Writers of the Middle Ages: a Critical Study of Texts from Perpetua (+203) to Marguerite Porete (+1310). Cambridge: Cambridge University Press ISBN 0-521-27573-3.
- Víñez Sánchez, Antonia (2014) "Matrimonio y mujer en la poesía de tres trobairitz", II International Conference Gender and Communication. Libro de Actas, Madrid: Dykinson, pp. 919–929.
