= Bernart Sicart de Marvejols =

13th century French troubadour and poet

Bernart Sicart de Maruèjols (fl. 1230) was a Languedocian troubadour from Marvejols in Lozère. His lone surviving work, a sirventes entitled Ab greu cossire ("With grave worrying"), is of historical interest for its commentary on the Albigensian Crusade and the lost culture of Languedoc from a native perspective.

The sirventes was set to the metre and melody of another by Guillem de Cabestany. Stylistically it follows a work by Peire Cardenal. Essentially it is an attack on the French crusaders, the military orders of the Temple and Hospital, and the clerics who preached the Crusade and supported the Papacy. It is a lament full of sadness as well as anger and hatred, simultaneously emotionally intense and bitingly sarcastic. It can be dated definitively to 1230 because of the Treaty of Paris the prior year, by which Raymond VII of Toulouse signed over his rights in southern France to the French king Louis IX. The poem was dedicated to James I of Aragon, and some later interpreters have placed Bernart at James' court, but there is no documentary evidence to support this.

== Sources ==
- Riquer, Martín de. Los trovadores: historia literaria y textos. 3 vol. Barcelona: Planeta, 1975.
