= Berengier Trobel =

Berengier Trobel or Berenguier Trobel (fl. 1275) was a troubadour and bourgeois from Rodez. He wrote two surviving cansos. Outside of his own poetry and the chansonniers that contain it he is known from only two documents of Rodez, both of which he witnessed in 1275.

One of his cansos is an attack on love. The other is about the dues of true love.

== Sources ==
- Jeanroy, Alfred (1934). La poésie lyrique des troubadours. Toulouse: Privat.
