= Rigaut de Berbezilh =

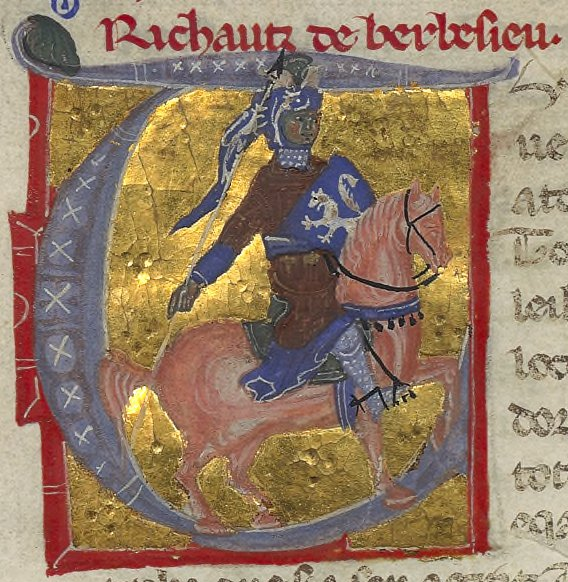
Rigaut, with his name spelled "Richautz de Barbesieu" above his picture, beside his vida introducing his works in a medieval chansonnier.

Rigaut de Berbezilh (also Berbezill or Barbesiu; French: Rigaud de Barbezieux, Latin: Rigaudus de Berbezillo) was a troubadour (fl. 1140–1163) of the petty nobility of Saintonge. He was a great influence on the Sicilian School and is quoted in the Roman de la Rose. About fifteen of his poems survive, including one planh and nine or ten cansos. His name is sometimes given as Richart or Richartz.

== Life ==
While the dates of his life are disputed, some maintaining a later career (c. 1170–1215), the general consensus is that he was an early troubadour.

=== Vida ===
According to his vida, the reliability of which is highly doubtful, he was a poor knight from the castle of Barbezieux near Cognac in the diocese of Saintes. He was described as capable and handsome, but saup mielhs trobar qu'entendre ni que dire: "he knew better how to compose poetry than to listen to it or recite it." He was reputed by the author of the vida to be timid, especially in the company of noblemen, but to sing "in a charming way" with encouragement.

Also according to his vida, he fell in love with the wife of Jaufre of Tonnay (Gaufridus de Tonai), possibly a daughter of Jaufre Rudel. She made "sweet pretenses of love to him ... like a lady who desired that a troubadour invent poems about her." He referred to her as Miellz-de-Domna, a senhal meaning "Best of Ladies", in at least four of his works. Though he sang songs about Miellz-de-Domna for a long time, it was not believed that he had a sexual relationship with her. When she died he went to Spain and, according to two manuscripts of his vida, spent the rest of his life at the court of Diego López II de Haro, a famed patron of troubadours.

=== History ===
It is generally accepted that Rigaut was indeed from a family who had been deputies of the lord of the castle of Barbezieux. His family was probably distantly related to that of Jaufre Rudel through the Counts of Angoulême. He himself was probably the younger of two sons, but he married into an Angoumois family of rank. His entire life seems to have been spent in the region just south of Angoulême and a post-1157 document refers to his entering a monastery.

== Poetry and melody ==
As a poet he was influenced by Marcabru. One of his works, Atressi com l'orifans, achieved lasting fame and its melody survives in at least three manuscripts, its text in a late thirteenth-century Italian novellino. As his vida states, he sought to be novel through the incorporation of natural images—such as birds, beasts, stars, and the Sun—in his poems and they contain learned references to Ovid and the legend of Perceval. His use of simile was heavy. Four cansos in total—two bestiary cansos, the Perceval canso, and a traditional canso—survive with melodies.

== Gallery ==
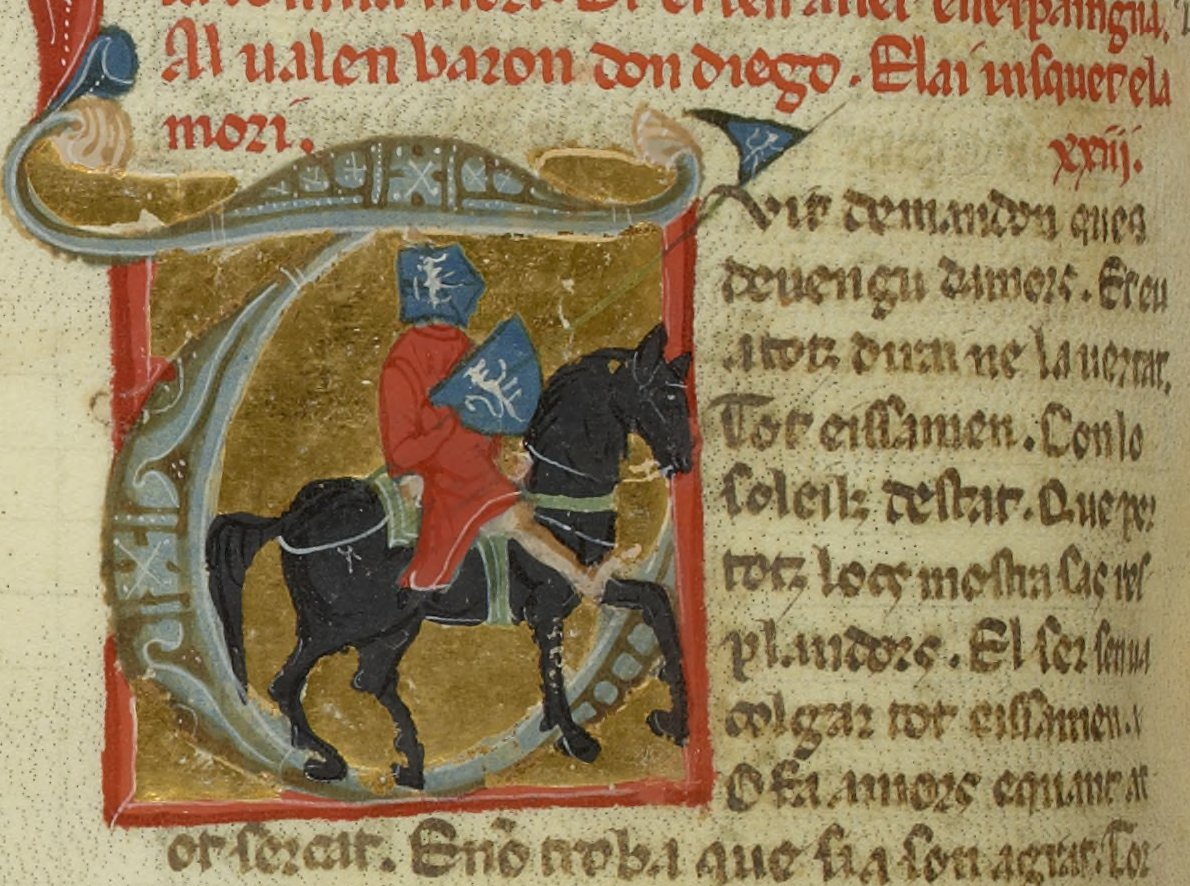
Rigaut as a knight in armour, with his coat-of-arms clearly visible

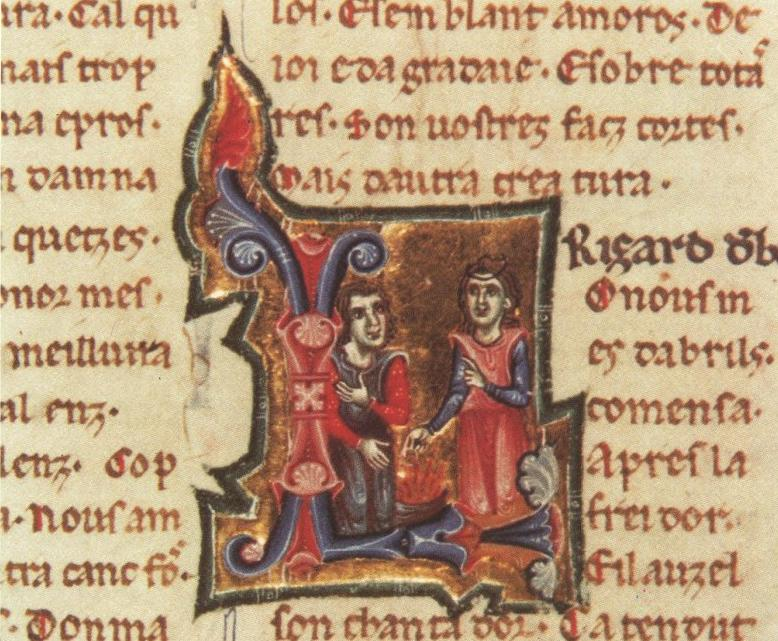
Rigaut and a ladyfriend at a bonfire.

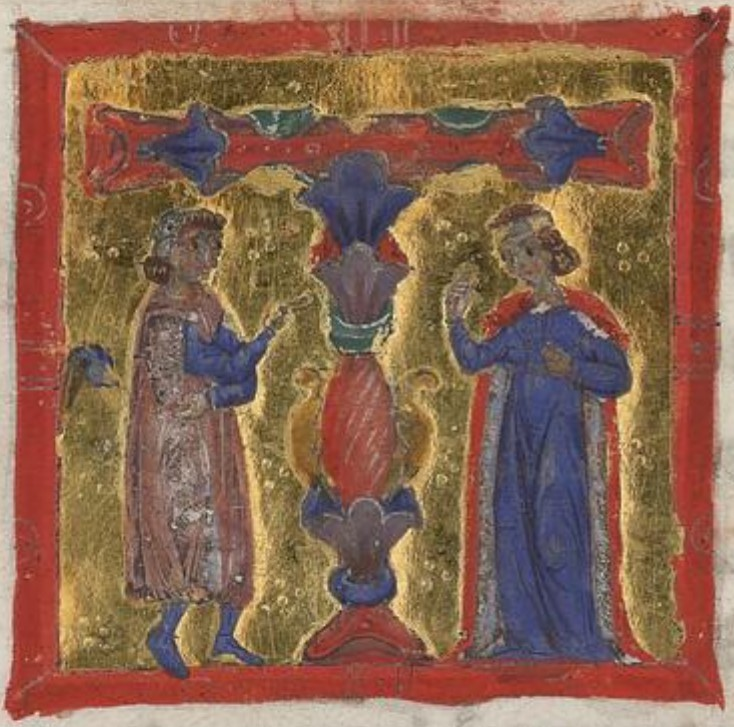
Rigaut and a ladyfriend discussing, from MS A, folio 164v (Biblioteca Apostolica Vaticana).
