= Bieiris de Romans =

Occitan trobairitz

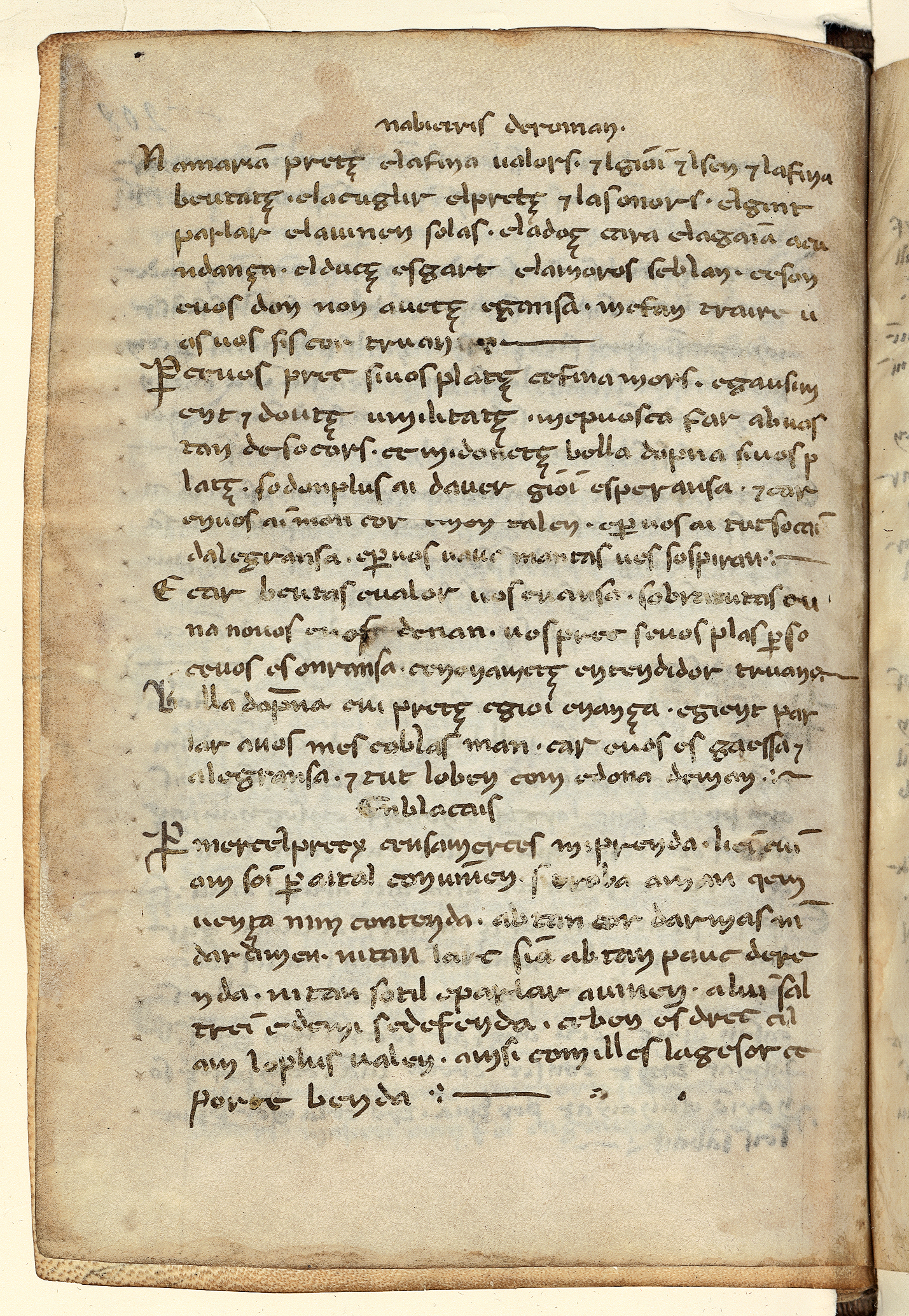
Manuscript page containing Bieris' canso Na Maria, pretz e fina valors from the BnF

Na Bieiris de Romans (Note: There is some disagreement as to whether the manuscripts read "Beiris", "Bierris", or "Bietris". Some scholars who question if the work was actually written by a woman have even argued that the name is a distortion of the male name "Alberic".) (English: Lady Beatrice of Romans; fl. c. 13th century) was a trobairitz of the first half of the thirteenth century. She was likely from Romans near Montélimar. Other than her name, which includes her place of birth, nothing is known of the details of her life, which has led to a significant gap in knowledge for scholarship analyzing her work. She left behind one canso, "Na Maria, pretz e fina valors" ("Lady Maria, in your merit and distinction"), addressed to another woman named Mary. The poem is written in the typical troubadour style of courtly love, has been the source of scholarly debate, with some interpreting it as an expression of lesbian desire, while others speculate that author could have been a mis-identified man, a woman writing as a man, or expressing platonic or spiritual devotion.

== Na Maria, pretz e fina valors ==
"Na Maria, pretz fina e valors" (Lady Maria, in your merit and distinction) is found in a fourteenth-century chansonnier.

=== Interpretations ===
Oskar Schultz-Gora, Alfred Jeanroy, François Zufferey, Gianfranco Folena and Elizabeth W. Poe have all argued that "Na Maria" was actually written by a man. Though initially believing Bieris to be a woman, Schultz-Gora changed his position, (Note: According to Rieger, this was done in response to pressure from critics) arguing that "Na Bieris" was actually a corruption of Alberico da Romano, a claim repeated by Jeanroy and Poe. Zufferey attributed the work to Gui d'Ussel, whose poems are located on the pages both before and after "Na Maria." Conversely, Jean-Baptiste de Lacurne de Sainte-Palaye, one of the earliest scholars of the poem, accepted that the author was a woman, but that she was simply working on behalf of a man. Similarly, Tilde Sankovitch argued that Bieiris may have been writing from the masculine point of view, fully immersing herself in the masculinity of the genre.

Bieiris' lesbianism, too, has its defenders: Pierre Bec, Magda Bogin, Renat Nelli, John Boswell, Frédérique Le Nan and Judith Bennett all assert that "Na Maria" can be read as an expression of lesbian affection.

Angelica Rieger has forcefully defended Bieiris' authorship but denied her lesbianism, saying that modern readers are imposing their biases onto the text. She has sought to show that Bieiris is in fact employing the language of affection popular among noblewomen of the period. Rieger supports her claims by comparing Bieiris' courtly language to that of Azalais de Porcairagues and Carenza. Alison Ganze expands on Rieger's assertion that Bieiris was indeed writing to another woman, but that the canso is consistent with expressions of political loyalty in the feudal system.

The last stanza of her canso reads as follows:

Bella doman, cui pretz e joi enansa e gen parlar, a vos mas coblas man, car en vos es gajess' e alegranssa, e tot lo ben qu'om en domna deman.	Lovely woman, whom joy and noble speech uplift, and merit, to you my stanzas go, for in you are gaiety and happiness, and all good things one could ask of a woman.

== Sources ==
- Bogin, Meg (1980). The women troubadours: an introduction to the women poets of 12th-century Provence and a collection of their poems. New York: Norton. ISBN 978-0-393-00965-1.
- Edwards, J. Michele (2004) [2001]. "Women in Music to ca. 1450". In Pendle, Karin (ed.). Women and music: a history (2nd ed.). Bloomington: Indiana University Press. pp. 26–54. ISBN 978-0-253-21422-5.
- Folena, Ganfranco (1976). "Tradizione e cultural trobadorica nelle corti e nelle citta venete" [Tradition and troubadour culture in Venetian courts and cities]. In Pozza, Neri (ed.). Storia della cultural veneta: Dalle Origini al Trecento [History of Venetian Culture: From the Origins to the Fourteenth Century] (in Italian). Venice. pp. 453–562. ISBN 9788873052906.
- Ganze, Alison (2009). ""Na Maria, Pretz E Fina Valors": A New Argument for Female Authorship". Romance Notes. 49 (1): 23–33. doi:10.1353/rmc.2009.0010. JSTOR 43801789. S2CID 73524718.
- Harvey, Ruth E. (1990). "Review of The Voice of the Trobairitz: Perspectives on the Women Troubadours". Medium Ævum. 59 (2): 332–333. doi:10.2307/43629370. ISSN 0025-8385.
- Jeanroy, Alfred (1973) [1934]. La Poesie Lyrique Des Troubadours [The Troubadours' Lyrical Poetry] (in French) (Reprint ed.). Geneva: Slatkine – via Internet Archive.
- La Curne de Sainte-Palaye, Jean-Baptiste de (1967) [1774]. Histoire littéraire des troubadours [Literary history of the troubadours] (in French) (Slatkine reprint ed.). Paris: l'abbé Millot – via Gallica.
- Le Nan, Frédérique (2018). "Na Bieiris De Romans, poétesse occitane du xiiie siècle, ou le genre auctorial en question" [Na Bieiris De Romans, thirteenth-century Occitan poetess, or the authorial gender in question]. Voix de femmes dans le monde [Women's voices from around the world] (in French). Rennes: Presses Universitaires de Rennes. pp. 29–48. doi:10.4000/books.pur.87380. ISBN 978-2-7535-7930-9.
- Paterson, Linda M. (1991). "Review of The Voice of the Trobairitz: Perspectives on the Women Troubadours". The Modern Language Review. 86 (1): 198–198. doi:10.2307/3732137. ISSN 0026-7937.
- Poe, Elizabeth W. (January 1992a). "Review of The Voice of the Trobairitz: Perspectives on the Women Troubadours. William D. Paden". Speculum. 67 (1): 207–209. eISSN 2040-8072. ISSN 0038-7134. JSTOR 2863806.
- Poe, Elizabeth Wilson (1992b). "A Dispassionate Look at the Trobairitz". Tenso. 7 (2): 142–164. doi:10.1353/ten.1992.0016. eISSN 1944-0146. ISSN 0890-3352.
- Rieger, Angelica (1989). "Was Bieiris de Romans Lesbian?: Women's Relations with Each Other in the World of the Troubadours". In Paden, William D. (ed.). The Voice of the Trobairitz : Perspectives on the Women Troubadours. University of Pennsylvania Press. pp. 73–94. ISBN 978-1-5128-0544-4. JSTOR j.ctv5130m8.
- Sankovitch, Tilde (1999). "The trobairitz". In Gaunt, Simon; Kay, Sarah (eds.). The troubadours: an introduction. Cambridge, UK: Cambridge University Press. pp. 113–126. ISBN 978-0-521-57388-7.
- Schultz-Gora, Oscar (1888). Die provenzalischen Dichterinnen: Biographieen und Texte [The Provençal women poets: Biographies and texts] (in German). Leipzig: Gustav Fock – via Internet Archive.
- Schultz-Gora, Oscar (1891). "Nabieiris de roman". Zeitschrift für romanische Philologie (in German). 15: 234–235. eISSN 1865-9063. ISSN 0049-8661 – via Internet Archive.
- Zufferey, François (1989). "Toward a Delimitation of the Trobairitz Corpus". In Paden, William D. (ed.). The Voice of the Trobairitz : Perspectives on the Women Troubadours. University of Pennsylvania Press. pp. 31–44. ISBN 978-1-5128-0544-4. JSTOR j.ctv5130m8.
