= Engenim d'Urre de Valentinès =

Troubadour

Engenim d'Urre de Valentinès was a troubadour, possibly from Eurre. He wrote an undatable sirventes attacking "evil barons" that begins Pois pres s'en fui qe non troba guirensa. Internal evidence may suggest he was a valvassor. The song is found in the sixteenth-century Italian paper manuscript known as chansonnier a. His name is written Engenim Durre in the manuscript, and another possible correction of this is En Genim, meaning "Sir Genim".

== Sources ==
- Björkman, Sven (2002). "Pois pres s'en fui qe non troba guirensa: Un sirventès du troubadour Engenim d'Urre de Valentinès", pp. 35–41. Mélanges publiés en hommage à Gunnel Engwall, ed. Inge Bartning. Acta Universitatis Stockholmiensis.
- Jeanroy, Alfred (1934). La poésie lyrique des troubadours. Toulouse: Privat.
