= Peire Bremon Ricas Novas =

Provençal troubadour

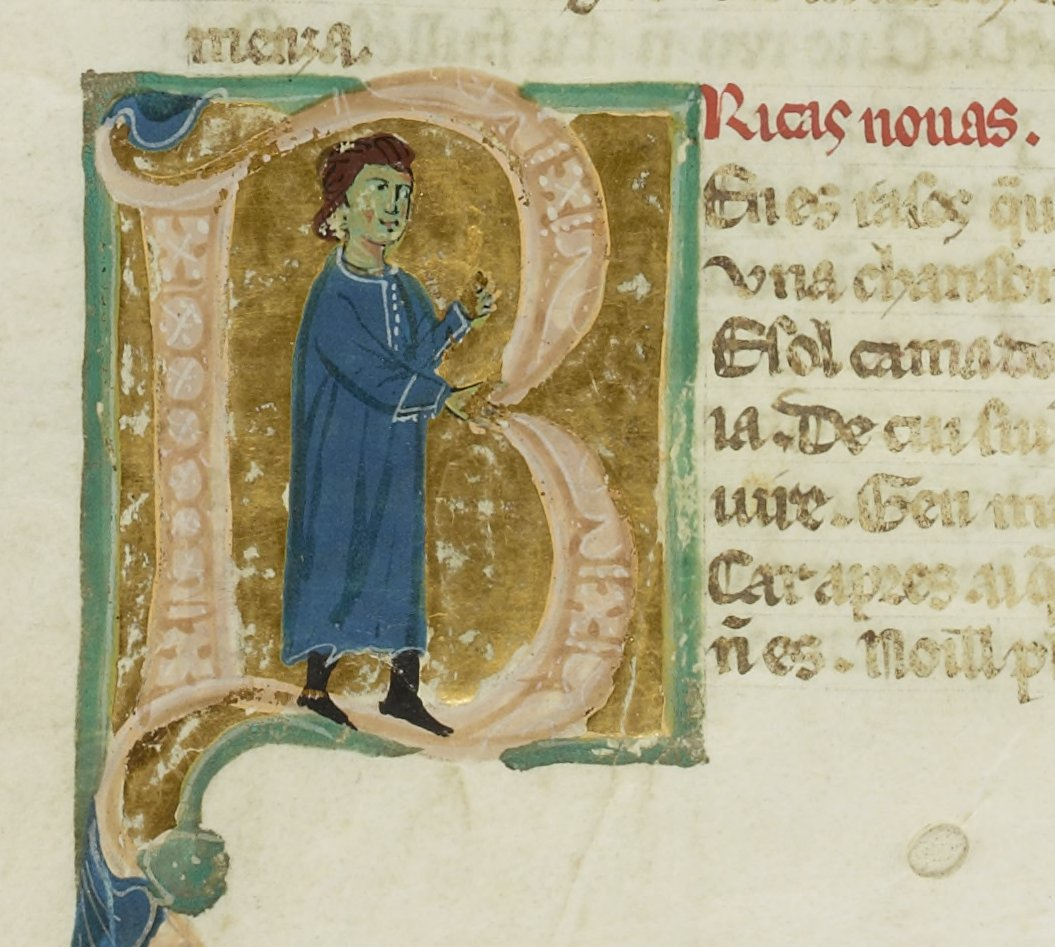
Ricas Novas

Peire Bremon Ricas Novas (fl. 1230–1242) was a Provençal troubadour who left behind twenty works: thirteen cansos, six sirventes, and one tenso. His treatment of courtly love was somewhat original.

Peire's senhal or nickname, Ricas Novas, means "interesting stories" (literally "rich news"). It indicates his reputation as a jongleur who spread wild tales. Peire's Provençal identity is clinched by his poem La cart cartier aurem nos autri proensal, with its reference to "us Provençals".

Peire's first datable work is a tenso written at the court of Raymond Berengar IV of Provence in 1230 with Gui de Cavalhon. At the court of Provence Peire also met Bertran d'Alamanon and Sordello, whose planh for Blacatz he imitated. Peire left the court of Raymond Berengar sometime in or after 1237 and went to that of Barral of Baux and thence to that of Raymond VII of Toulouse. Though there is no record of his having visited Spain, his Rics pres, ferms e sobeirans celebrates an anonymous Castilian domna (lady). He eventually fell out with Sordello and the two had an acrimonious exchange of vitriolic sirventes in 1240–41.

== Sources ==
- Atkinson Jenkins, T. "On Newness in the Novel", Periodical of the Modern Language Association, 41, Appendix (1926), pp. xliii–lix.
- Bertoni, Giulio. I Trovatori d'Italia: Biografie, testi, tradizioni, note. Rome: Società Multigrafica Editrice Somu, 1967 [1915].
- Boutière, Jean. La Poésies du troubadour Peire Bremon Ricas Novas. Bibliothèque méridionale, 1ere série, 21. Toulouse and Paris: 1930.
- Gaunt, Simon, and Kay, Sarah. "Appendix I: Major Troubadours" (pp. 279–291). The Troubadours: An Introduction. Simon Gaunt and Sarah Kay, edd. Cambridge: Cambridge University Press, 1999. ISBN 0-521-57473-0.
- Riquer, Martín de. Los trovadores: historia literaria y textos. 3 vol. Barcelona: Planeta, 1975.
- Thiolier-Méjean, Suzanne. Une belle au bois dormant médiévale: Frayre de Joy et Sor de Plaser—Nouvelle d'oc du XIV^{e} siècle: Text, traduction, notes et commentaires. Centre d'Enseignement et Recherche d'Oc, VIII. Paris: Presses de l'Université de Paris-Sorbonne, 1996.
