= Tomier and Palaizi =

13th century troubadours

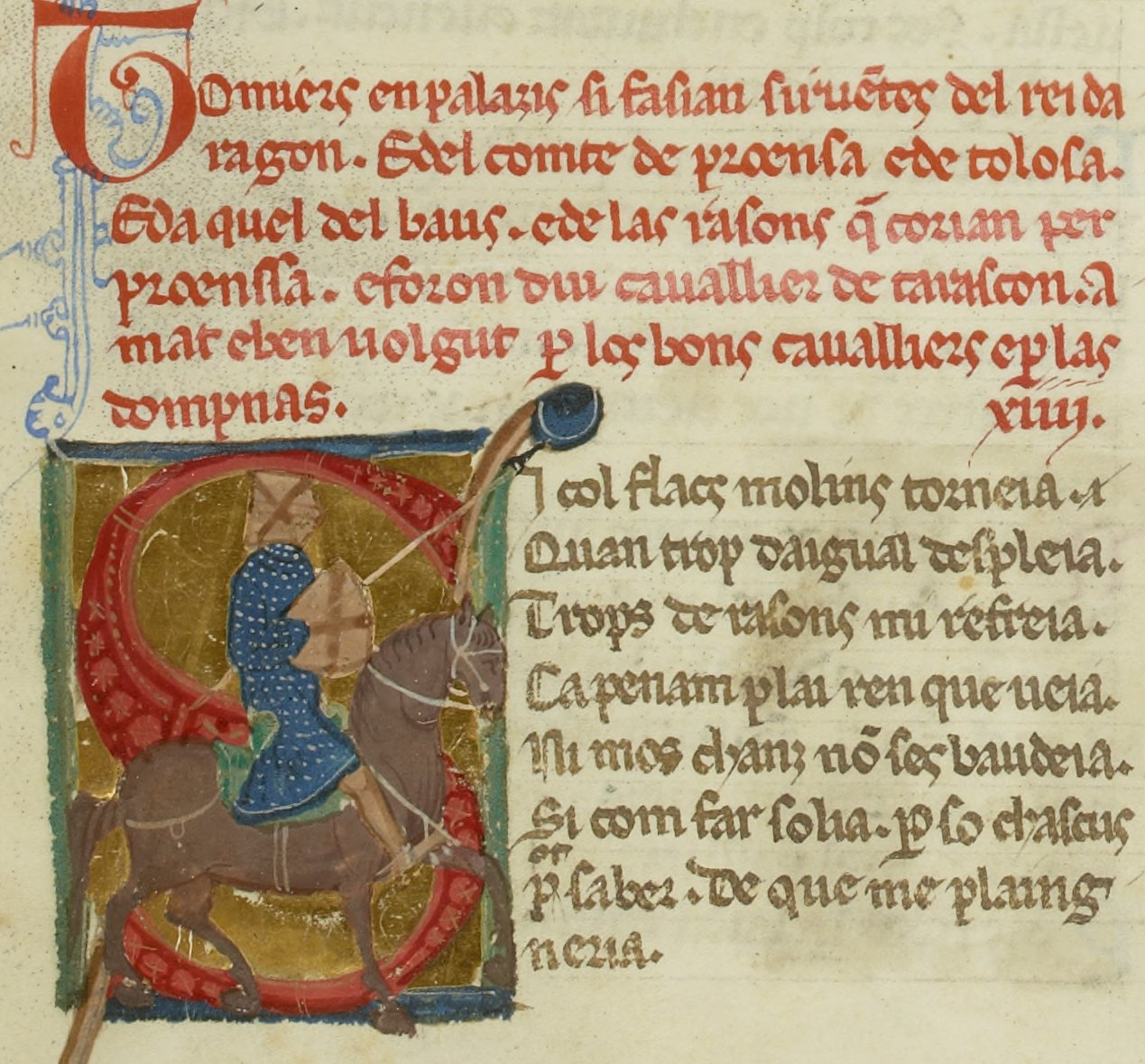
The vida (text in red) of Tomier and Palaizi with an accompanying picture of a knight

Tomier and Palaizi (or Palazi) were two knights and troubadours from Tarascon, possibly brothers, and frequent comrades and co-composers (fl. 1199–1226).

Palaizi and Tomier were involved in the Albigensian Crusade. In the sirventes De chantar farai, written probably during Louis VIII's siege of Avignon in 1226, they criticised the Albigensian Crusaders and the Papacy — "those who have turned the crusade" — for diverting "succour and valour" (aid and military support) from the "Sepulchre" (the Holy Land), which was "disbelief", i.e. "a sin against the faith":

Al Sepolcr'an tout
socors e valenza
cil q'an la croz vout,
et es decredenza.

The Albigensian Crusade was described as a falsa croisada and the song had a rhyming refrain which must have been intended to arouse Provenç passions for the fight against the French: Segur estem, seignors, / E ferm de ric socors! ("Lords, we are certain and confident of mighty aid"). Tomier and Palaizi blamed the church leadership, especially the legate Romano of Sant'Angelo, for avarice. In an earlier, and less violent sirventes, Si col flacs molins torneja (c. 1216), the two troubadours explain that the Albigensian venture ruins the roads and ports that lead to Acre, where the true Crusade is being waged. To them, the Crusaders pauc a en Deu d'esperanssa (have little hope in God). In the end Tomier and Palaizi attacked the Church for heresy and thus marked themselves out as heretics from the Church of Rome.

== Sources ==
- Graham-Leigh, Elaine. The Southern French Nobility and the Albigensian Crusade. Woodbridge: The Boydell Press, 2005. ISBN 1-84383-129-5
- Throop, Palmer A. "Criticism of Papal Crusade Policy in Old French and Provençal." Speculum, Vol. 13, No. 4. (Oct., 1938), pp 379–412.
- Puckett, Jaye. "'Reconmenciez novele estoire': The Troubadours and the Rhetoric of the Later Crusades." MLN, Vol. 116, No. 4, French Issue. (Sep., 2001), pp 844–889.
