= Amoros dau Luc =

French troubadour

Amoros dau Luc was a troubadour who wrote a satirical sirventes, "En Chantarel, sirventes ab motz plas," which urged Henry III of England and his ally, Peter of Brittany, in their campaign in France in 1230. The sirventes is probably ironic. It closes with an amorous dedication to a woman.

== Bibliography ==
- Bibliografia Elettronica dei Trovatori, v. 2.0. Retrieved 4 October 2011.
