= Peire Milo =

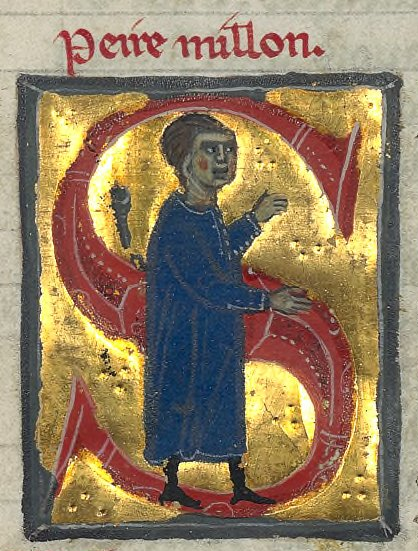
Peire Milo

Peire Milo, Milon or Millon was a mid-13th-century Italian troubadour. His cobla esparsa "En amor trop pietat gran", he derives the word amor (love) from suffering and death (mor). His only other songs are cansos:

- "Aissi m'ave com cel qui seignors dos"
- "A vos, merces, voill retrar mon afaire"
- "Per pratz vertz ni per amor"
- "Pos l'us auzels envas l'autre s'atura"
- "Pos que dal cor m'ave, farai chansos"
- "Quant hom troba dos bos combatedo"
- "S'eu anc d'amor sofers ni mal ni pena"
- "Si com lo metge fa crer"

== Bibliography ==
- Borghi Cedrini, Luciana. "Osservazioni sulla tradizione manoscritta di Peire Milo", in Atti del XXI Congresso Internazionale di Linguistica e Filologia Romanza (Palermo, 18–24 September 1995), vol. 6, sect. 7 (Tübingen: Niemeyer, 1998 ), pp. 37–45.
