= Giraut del Luc =

Giraut sits in the initial G of Ges sitot in troubadour chansonnier A

Ges sitot m'ai ma voluntat fellona and Si per malvatz seignoril in chansonnier D, where his name (in red) is spelled Giraut de Luc

Giraut del Luc (fl. 1190–1197) was a minor troubadour. He was a partisan of Raymond VI of Toulouse in his wars with the Crown of Aragon and left behind two sirventes attacking Alfonso II of Aragon.

Giraut's birthplace cannot be identified with certainty. Historically, there are many locations named Luc or Le Luc in southern France. Giraut may be the G. del Luc who signed two documents of August and October 1197 at Moissac. He definitely had some relationship with the Order of the Temple.

Giraut was not an original poet. His Si per malvatz seignoril has the same meter as Talans m'es pres d'En Marques by Guillem de Berguedan. His Ges sitot m'ai ma voluntat fellona is hardly more original, but far more interesting for what it says about Giraut's learning: its melody is borrowed from the chanson de geste Daurel et Beton, as is its "hero", Boves d'Antona. It is a string of accusations of injustice levelled at Alfonso, including many which indicate that Giraut was well-informed of political events on both sides of the Pyrenees. He mentions Alfonso's mistreatment of his uncle (though we do not know who Giraut's uncle was) and he refers to 1178, when a man claiming to be Alfonso the Battler was executed. He also mentions the capture of the castle of Polpís de Maestrazgo.
