= Peire Raimon de Tolosa =

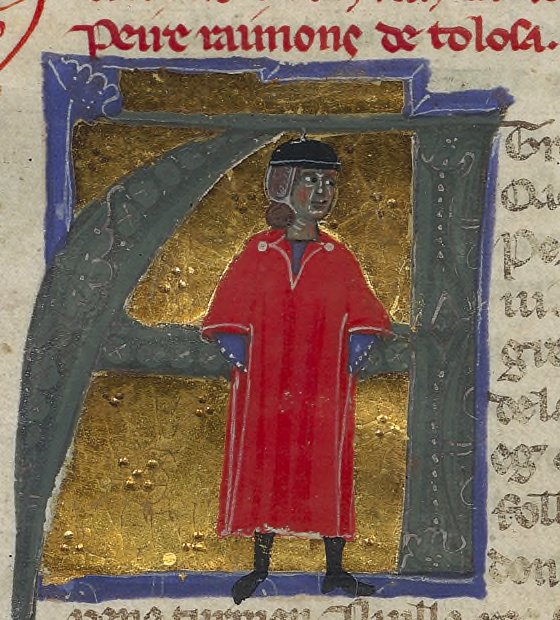
Miniature depiction of Peire Raimon de Tolosa

Peire Raimon de Tolosa (or Toloza; fl. 1180–1220) was a troubadour from the merchant class of Toulouse. He is variously referred to as lo Viellz ("the Old") and lo Gros ("the Fat"), though these are thought by some to refer to two different persons. On the other hand, lo Viellz could refer to his being of an early generation of troubadours. Eighteen of Peire Ramon's poems survive, one canso with a melody.

Peire Ramon's name (as Petrus Raimundus) appears in two documents of Toulouse, dated to 1182 and 1214. According to his vida, he became a jongleur and travelled to the court of Alfonso II of Aragon, who bestowed great honour on him. The earliest datable work by Peire Ramon is a planh written on the death of Henry the Young King in 1183. According to his vida Peire passed "a long time" at the courts of Alfonso, William VIII of Montpellier, and a certain "Count Raymond", which could refer to either Raymond V of Toulouse or, more probably, Raymond VI. He also spent time in Italy (Lombardy and Piedmont), at the courts of Thomas I of Savoy, Guglielmo Malaspina, and Azzo VI of Este. Azzo's daughter Beatriz was the addressee of one of Peire's poems. Eventually Peire settled down with a wife in Pamiers and there he died.

Peire was reputed as a singer and composer of cansos. His work is characterised by themes of nature. His style was hermetic. He imitated the troubadours Cadenet and Arnaut Daniel and was in turn imitated by Bertran de Born, especially as regards his use of natural imagery. Bertran went so far as to copy almost a whole stanza from Peire's "No.m puesc sofrir d'una leu chanso faire." In "Us noels pessamens", Peire even anticipates the Tuscan poet Dante Alighieri. Peire is complaining about a mistress who first beckoned him and then broke her promise to him when he says:

Que qui non a vezat aver
gran be, plus leu pot sostener
afan que tal es rics e bos;
que.l maltrag l'es plus angoyssos,
quan li soven benanansa.

Peire's sole surviving melody is florid like Cadenet's. His style employs an uncommonly high number of large intervals, including tritones. The poem with the melody is built on an innovative metaphor:

Atressi cum la candela
que si meteissa destrui
per far clartat ad autrui,
chant, on plus trac gren martire,
per plazer de l'autra gen.

== Sources ==
- Anglade, Joseph. Poésies du troubadour Peire Raimon de Toulouse. 1920.
- Aubrey, Elizabeth. The Music of the Troubadours. Indiana University Press, 1996. ISBN 0-253-21389-4.
- Egan, Margarita, ed. and trans. The Vidas of the Troubadours. New York: Garland, 1984. ISBN 0-8240-9437-9.
- Gouiran, Gérard. "The Classical Period: from Raimbaut d'Aurenga to Arnaut Daniel." The Troubadours: An Introduction. Simon Gaunt and Sarah Kay, edd. Cambridge: Cambridge University Press, 1999. ISBN 0-521-57473-0.
- Kastner, L. E. "Notes on the Poems of Bertran de Born." The Modern Language Review, 31:1 (Jan., 1936), pp. 20–33.
- Lewent, Kurt. "Old Provençal Miscellany: 1. Troubadours as Precursors of Dante." The Modern Language Review, 38:2 (Apr., 1943), pp. 106–116.
