= Elias Cairel =

French troubadour

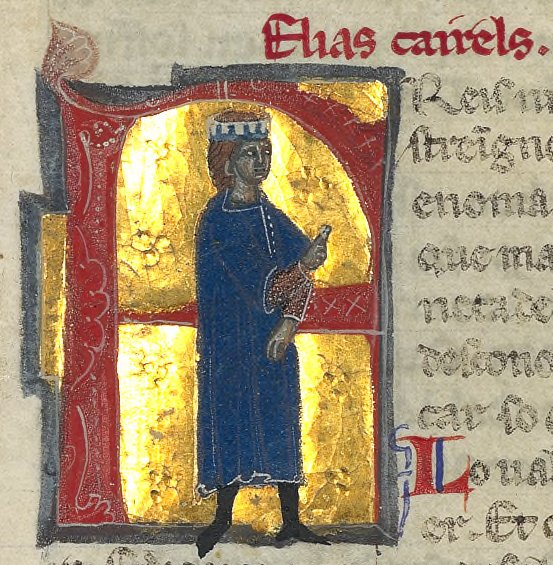
Elias Cairel from a 13th-century chansonnier

Elias Cairel (or Cayrel; fl. 1204–1222) was a troubadour of international fame. Born in Sarlat in the Périgord, he first travelled with the Fourth Crusade and settled down in the Kingdom of Thessalonica at the court of Boniface of Montferrat (1204–1208/10) before moving back to western Europe, where he sojourned at the court of Alfonso IX of León (1210–11) and in Lombardy (1219–1222/24). He wrote fourteen surviving lyrics: ten cansos, one tenso, one descort, one sirventes, and one Crusade song. He was partial to refrain rhyming and coblas capfinidas.

Elias' vida survives in three manuscripts with a variant in a fourth designed to refute the other three. According to his biographer he was gold- and silversmith and an armourer who turned to minstrelsy. His singing, composition, fiddling, and speaking were reputed as "bad", but his biographer says ben escrivia motz e sons: "well he wrote words and songs", implying a distinction between his composing and his writing. He supposedly returned from Romania to die in Sarlat.

Elias composed his only tenso with the trobairitz Ysabella, who may have been either a high-ranking noblewoman of Italy or Greece, or perhaps just a local girl of Périgord who Elias knew in his youth. She is also the addressee of two other poems. Elias also addressed one poem to "Roiz Dies", a Spanish patron, probably Rodrigo Díaz de los Cameros, and another to Conon de Béthune (Coino), a trouvère. Elias may have been present at the Battle of Las Navas de Tolosa in 1212.

In his Toz m'era de chantar gequiz, the Bolognese troubadour Rambertino Buvalelli asks Elias to bring the poem to Beatrice d'Este when he travels to the court of Azzo VII at Este.

== Works ==
- Abril ni mai non aten de far vers
- Era no vei puoi ni comba
- Estat ai dos ans (addressed to Ysabella)
- Freit ni ven, no·m posc destreigner
- Lo rossinhols chanta tan dousamen
- Mout mi platz lo doutz temps d'abril (addressed to Ysabella)
- N'Elyas Cairel, de l'amor (with Ysabella)
- Per mantener joi e chant e solatz
- Pois chai la fuoilla del garric
- Qan la freidors irais l'aura dousana
- Qui saubes dar tant bon conseil denan
- Si cum cel qe sos compaignos
- So qe·m sol dar alegranssa
- Totz mos cors e mos sens (addressed to Ruiz)

== Sources and further reading ==
- Aubrey, Elizabeth. The Music of the Troubadours. Indiana University Press, 1996. ISBN 0-253-21389-4.
- Bertoni, Giulio. I Trovatori d'Italia: Biografie, testi, tradizioni, note. Rome: Società Multigrafica Editrice Somu, 1967 [1915].
- Bruckner, M. T.; Shepard, L.; and White, S. Songs of the Women Troubadours. New York: Garland Publishing, 1995. ISBN 0-8153-0817-5.
- Egan, Margarita (ed. and trans.) The Vidas of the Troubadours. New York: Garland, 1984. ISBN 0-8240-9437-9.
- Gaunt, Simon, and Kay, Sarah. "Appendix I: Major Troubadours" (pp. 279–291). The Troubadours: An Introduction. Simon Gaunt and Sarah Kay, edd. Cambridge: Cambridge University Press, 1999. ISBN 0-521-57473-0.
- Jaeschke, Hilde, ed. Der Trobador Elias Cairel. Berlin: Emil Ebering, 1921. Text at archive.org
- Riquer, Martín de. Los trovadores: historia literaria y textos. 3 vol. Barcelona: Planeta, 1975.
