= Audric del Vilar =

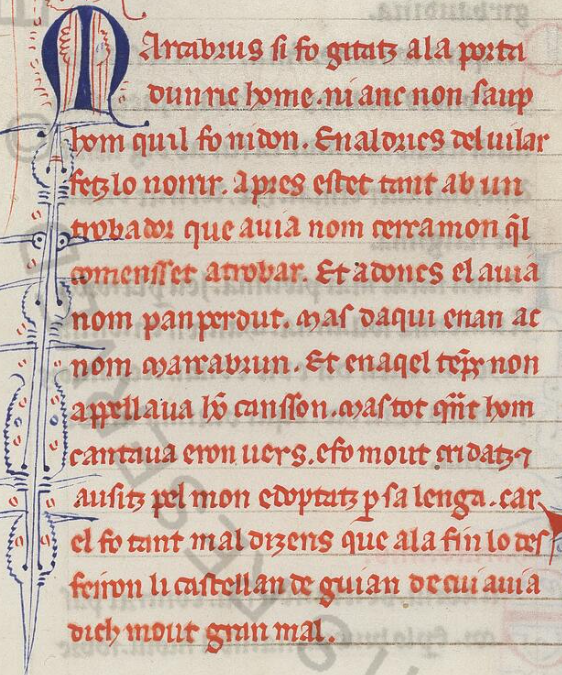
Marcabru's vida that mentions Audric

Aldric or Audric del Vilar was the twelfth-century lord of Auvillar and a troubadour. According to the vida of Marcabru, he raised the young Marcabru. This may in fact be derived by Marcabru's biographer from an exchange of satiric songs between the two, beginning with Audric's "Tot a estru" (16b.1), to which Marcabru responded with "Seigner n'Audric" (293.43). Audric may have been originally writing in response to Marcabru's gap "D'aisso lau Dieu". The whole exchange revolves around Marcabru's claim that he will accept bread from a fool so long as it lasts. On the other hand, both of Marcabru's pieces, which share Audric's metrical form, may be responses to Audric. Audric introduced the nickname Pan-Perdut (Breadless) for Marcabru.
