= Montan (troubadour) =

Provençal troubadour

Montan (fl. c. 1250) was a Provençal troubadour whose real name, as well as any biographical detail, is unknown: his sobriquet means "the mounter", which is sexually suggestive, evidenced in his piece Eu venh vas vos, seinher, fauda levada, which is considered the most obscene ever produced by a troubadour. Other than this, three pieces are extant, a single stanza in a tenso with Sordello and two coblas esparsas.

Montan is also mentioned in a poem by Ramon de Rosselló, a sign that his peculiar nickname was customarily used in his time.
