= Formit de Perpinyà =

Formit de Perpinyà or Perpegnan was a Catalan troubadour from Perpignan in the Roussillon which was then under the Crown of Aragon, possibly living in the thirteenth century. His name, Formit, rare for the time, means "satisfied, perfect, ready" and was probably a nickname. Only one canso survives to his name, preserved in only one chansonnier. It comprises four coblas unissonans. Its first line begins Un dolz dezirs amorous and it is metrically, but not rhymewise, identical to A vos, bona don'e pros which is attributed by some manuscripts to Raimbaut de Vaqueiras and by others left unattributed, leading subsequent scholars to suggest that it was the work of either Aimeric de Pegulhan or Formit.

== Sources ==
- Riquer, Martín de. Los trovadores: historia literaria y textos (in Spanish). 3 vols. Barcelona: Planeta, 1975. ISBN 84-320-7600-7 Vol. I • Vol. II • Vol. III
