= Raimon de Miraval =

French troubadour

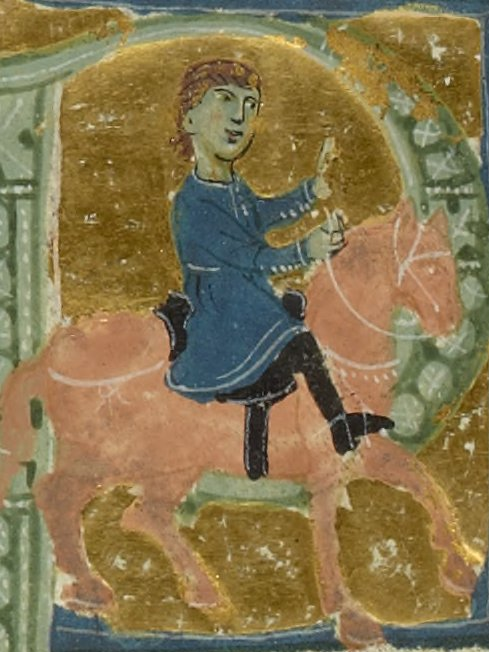
Raimon de Miraval.

Raimon de Miraval(h) (c. 1135/1160 – c. 1220) was a troubadour (fl. 1180–1220) and, according to his vida, "a poor knight from Carcassonne who owned less than a quarter of the castle of Miraval." Favoured by Raymond VI of Toulouse, he was also later associated with Peter II of Aragon and Alfonso VIII of Castile. His senhal for Raymond VI was Audiart.

Raimon served as the basis of the lyrical poetic skill imagined in Elias de Barjols' idealization of the courtly knight, which was a response to the Bertran de Born idealization called the domna soisseubuda/dompna soiseubuda (ideal lady).

Raimon has been identified with a person of the same name who undersigned a charter of 1151, which led some to place his birth date as early as c. 1135, while others reject the identification with the Raimon de Miraval of the charter and estimate his birth date at 1160 based on the height of his career c. 1200. That Raimon owned only a quarter of his family's ancestral castle is an indication either of partible inheritance or clan structure. Miraval was captured by Simon de Montfort during the Albigensian Crusade. After the Battle of Muret in 1213 Raimon probably fled to Spain, after swearing never to sing again until he had regained his castle.

At some point he separated from his wife, Gaudairença (or Caudairenga), herself the author of the (now lost) song Coblas e dansas, for uncourtly behaviour. Now a single man, he pursued, with little amatory success but great poetic inspiration, his muses, first Étiennette de Pennautier, wife of Jourdain de Cabaret, “la loba”, the she-wolf, who eventually settled with the Raymond-Roger, Count of Foix, and then with Azalaïs de Boissézon, another married lady, who used his graphic descriptions of her to lure Peter II of Aragon (whom Raimon knew ) into her bed.

Of Raimon's works 45 remain, of which 22 have melodies: one of the highest survival rates among troubadours. Most of these works are of the trobar leu style. Raimon addressed many works to one named "Pastoret", but the identification of this person has been problematic, though he is usually identified as Raymond Roger Trencavel. Raimon was admired by contemporaries and by most poets of later generations and he is famous for his handling of the subject of courtly love. Raimon represents a move away from the traditional cansos celebrating the jois d'amor ("joys of love") or amor de lonh ("love from afar"), but rather emphasizing courtliness, honor, and reputation. The highest virtue is faithfulness, but this hinges on courtliness (pretz e valor). He conceived of the relationship between the troubadour and his lady as a reciprocal partnership, in which she would offer protection and possibly favor while he fostered her social worth by all means possible.
