= Peire Cardenal =

Troubadour

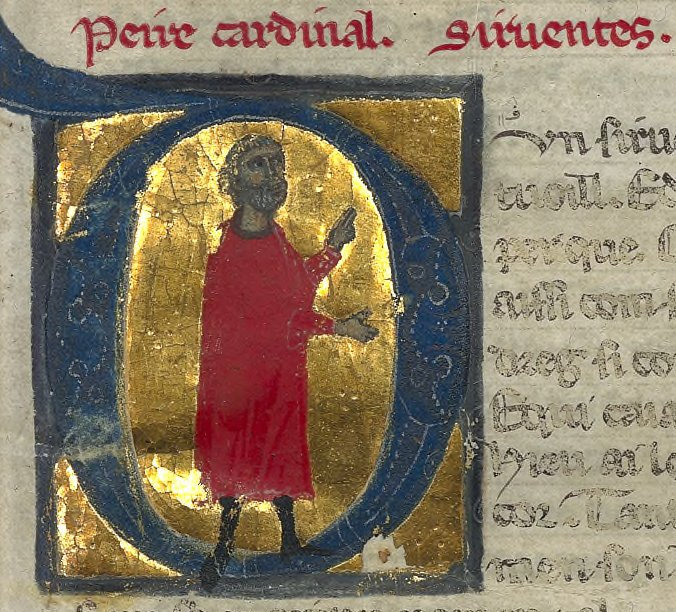
Cardenal in manuscript BnF fr. 12473

Peire Cardenal (or Cardinal) (c. 1180 – c. 1278) was a troubadour (fl. 1204 – 1272) known for his satirical sirventes and his dislike of the clergy. Ninety-six pieces of his remain, a number rarely matched by other poets of the age.

Peire Cardenal was born in Le Puy-en-Velay, apparently of a noble family; the family name Cardenal appears in many documents of the region in the 13th and 14th centuries. He was educated as a canon, which education directed him to vernacular lyric poetry and he abandoned his career in the church for "the vanity of this world", according to his vida. Peire began his career at the court of Raymond VI of Toulouse—from whom he sought patronage—and a document of 1204 refers to a Petrus Cardinalis as a scribe of Raymond's chancery. At Raymond's court, however, he appears to have been known as Peire del Puoi or Puei (French: Pierre du Puy). Around 1238 he wrote a partimen beginning Peire del Puei, li trobador with Aimeric de Pegulhan.

At Raymond's court also perhaps, probably in 1213, Peire composed a sirventes, Las amairitz, qui encolpar las vol, which may have encouraged Peter II of Aragon to help Toulouse in the Battle of Muret, where Peter died. In this sirventes Peire alludes first perhaps to the accusations of adultery that Peter had leveled against Peter's wife Maria of Montpellier but also perhaps to the various changes in law governing women. In the second stanza Peire mentions Peter's success in the Battle of Las Navas de Tolosa; in the third he alludes to the sacking of Béziers (whose count Raymond Roger Trencavel was supposed to have been Peter's vassal): at Béziers the poorer soldiers of the Inquisition were flogged by the wealthier, and this is the theme of the stanza. Peire's mention of the court of Constantine may also again evoke the divorce proceedings of Peter and Marie where Peire ultimately lost. Peire later alludes to the death of someone (perhaps a daughter or perhaps Peire's wife Marie) and then apparently to the couple's son James I of Aragon, born at Candlemas, according to James's Chronicle. It's not clear who the crois hom or "dreadful man" is in the final couplet, whose deeds are "piggish": Peire has really never addressed anyone in this verse but Peter II and those close to him. (But dualism had by then made its way into some of the local religious views of Medieval Languedoc: in dualist philosophy worldly deeds might be seen as "piggish".)

Peire subsequently travelled widely, visiting the courts of Auvergne, Les Baux, Foix, Rodez, and Vienne. He may have even ventured into Spain and met Alfonso X of Castile, and James I of Aragon, although he never mentions the latter by name in his poems. (James is however of course mentioned in Peire's vida.) During his travels Peire was accompanied by a suite of jongleurs, some of whom receive mention by name in his poetry.

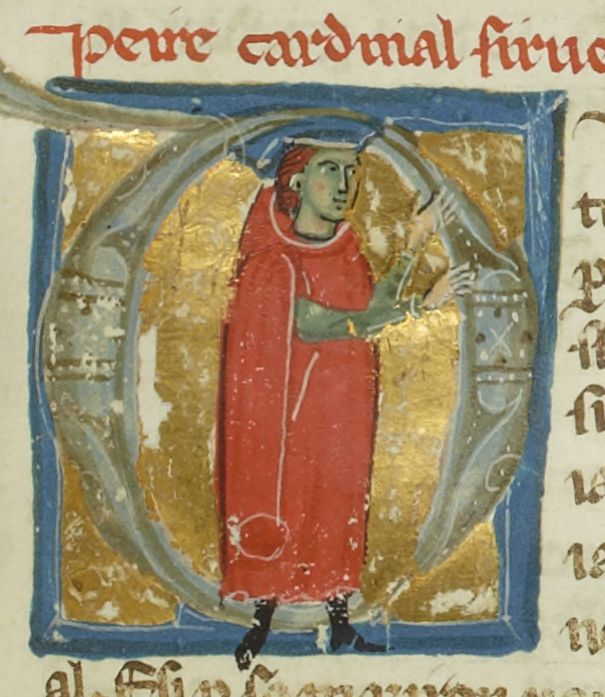
Cardenal in manuscript BnF fr. 856

Among the other troubadours Peire encountered in his travels were Aimeric de Belenoi and Raimon de Miraval. He may have met Daude de Pradas and Guiraut Riquier at Rodez. Peire was influenced by Cadenet, whom he honoured in one of his pieces. He was possibly influenced by Bernart de Venzac.

In his early days he was a vehement opponent of the French, the clergy and the Albigensian Crusade. In the sirventes, Ab votz d'angel, lengu' esperta, non bleza, dated by Hill and Bergin to around 1229 (when the tribunal of the Inquisition was established at Toulouse by the Dominican Order), Peire enjoins those who seek God to follow the example of those who "drink beer" and "eat bread of gruel and bran", rather than argue over "which wine is the best". The latter behavior Peire's verse attributes to the "Jacobins" (Hill and Bergin say this is the Dominican Order).

In Li clerc si fan pastor he condemned the "possession" of the laity by the clergy, for so long as the clergy order it, the laity will "draw their swords towards heaven and get into the saddle." This poem was written probably around 1245, after the First Council of Lyon, where the clergy took action against the Emperor Frederick II, but not against the Saracens. In Atressi cum per fargar Peire suggests that the clergy "protect their own swinish flesh from every blade", but they do not care how many knights die in battle. Peire was not an opponent of Christianity or even the Crusades. In Totz lo mons es vestitiz et abrazatz he urged Philip III of France, who had recently succeeded his father, Louis IX, who died in 1270 on the failed Eighth Crusade, to go to the aid of Edward Longshanks, then on the Ninth Crusade in Syria.

Near the end of the sirventes, Ab votz d'angel, lengu' esperta, non bleza, composed as noted probably around 1229, Peire's words, [s]'ieu fos maritz, "if I were wed", suggest that he is not yet wed. The verse which follows provides evidence in the view of some that Peire married: it first mocks the "barrenness that bears fruit" of the beguinas (beguines, who may have sometimes been associated with the Dominicans; Hill and Bergin in 1973 said this was a reference to nuns of the Dominican Order). Throughout the verse of course Peire had been poking fun at the Dominican clergy, but the comment about the nuns may have additional significance. His tone changes after this and his closing lines suggest though that all this is a miracle from the "saintly fathers", suggesting his acceptance of things: Cardenal.org says that some have interpreted these lines as suggesting that Peire married at this time.

By the end of his life he appears reconciled to the new modus vivendi in southern France. He died at an advanced age (allegedly one hundred years old) possibly either in Montpellier or Nimes, but this is only a supposition, based on where the biographer and compiler Miquel de la Tor was active.

Three of Peire's songs have surviving melodies, but two (for a canso and a sirventes) were composed by others: Guiraut de Bornelh and Raimon Jordan respectively. Like many of his contemporary troubadours, Peire merely composed contrafacta. The third, for Un sirventesc novel vuelh comensar, may be Peire's own work. It is similar to the borrowed melody of Guiraut de Bornelh, mostly syllabic with melismas at phrasal ends. The meagre number of surviving tunes (attributable to him) relative to his output of poetry is surprising considering his vida states that "he invented poetry about many beautiful subjects with beautiful tunes."
