= Raimon d'Avinhon =

Raimon d'Avinhon was a Provençal troubadour from Avignon. He wrote one surviving sirventes, "Sirvens sui avutz et arlotz", preserved in a manuscript of 1254. The sirventes is a long and humorous list of occupations he claims to have had, including bos meges, quant es locs: "a good physician, when it's time". It has been speculated that he was the Raimon d'Avinhon who translated the Practica Chirurgiae of Ruggero da Salerno (Roger de Parma) into Occitan verse c. 1200 and that he was a physician. If it is correct that Raimon was a physician, then his poem appears to be in a category with the Dû de l'Herberie of Rutebeuf.

== Sources ==
- Riquer, Martín de. Los trovadores: historia literaria y textos. 3 vol. Barcelona: Planeta, 1975.
