= Raimon de Rusillon =

Raimon de Rusillon (Catalan: Ramon de Rosselló) was a minor Catalan troubadour who wrote in Old Occitan. Only one of his Occitan compositions survives, and in only one manuscript. His sole cobla esparsa is insignificant literarily, but it mentions the troubadour Montan, who from a debate with Sordello, allows Ramon's life to be placed in the mid-thirteenth century.

Ramon's name is given as Ramonz bistor de rusillon in the rubric of his poem, but the scribe had in fact confused him with another troubadour, Raimon Bistort (Bistortz).

== Sources ==
- Riquer, Martí de (1964). Història de la Literatura Catalana, vol. 1. Barcelona: Edicions Ariel.
