= Aimeric de Sarlat =

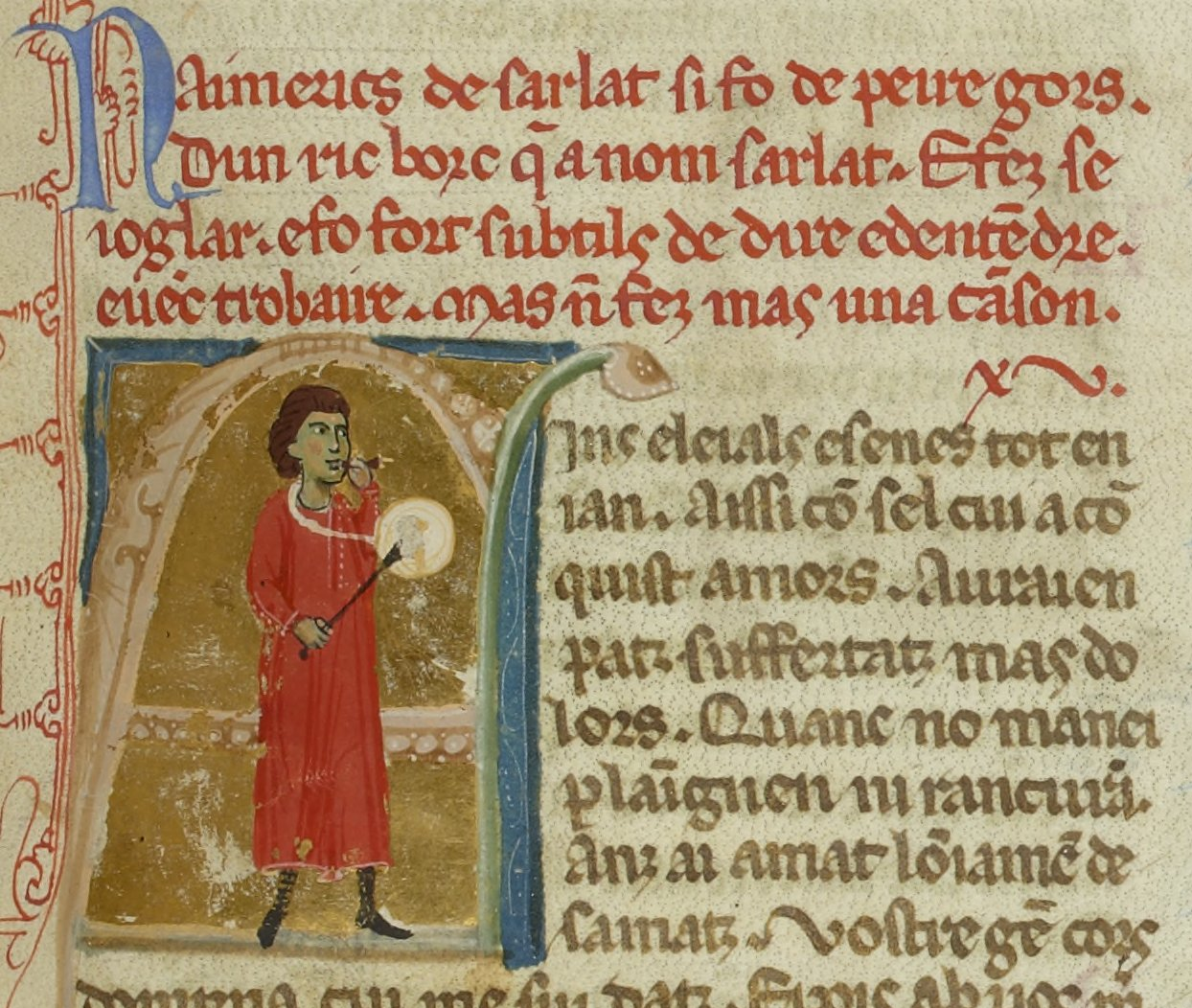
N'Aimerics de sarlat si fo de peiregors dun ric borc q' a nom sarlat. . . "Sir Aimeric de Sarlat was from the Périgord, from a rich bourg named Sarlat. . ." Aimeric is shown playing a pipe and tabor.

Aimeric de Sarlat (fl. c. 1200) was a troubadour from Sarlat in the Périgord. According to his vida he rose by talent from the rank of jongleur to troubadour, but composed only one song. In fact, four cansos survive under his name.

The sole topic with which his surviving work is concerned is courtly love; he was an imitator of Bernart de Ventadorn. A fifth canso, "Fins e leials e senes tot engan", attributed in the chansonniers to Aimeric de Belenoi, has been assigned to Aimeric de Sarlat by modern scholarship, partly because it is directed to Elvira de Subirats, wife of Ermengol VIII of Urgell, to whom Aimeric de Sarlat had addressed his "Ja non creirai q'afanz ni cossiriers". An example of Aimeric's poetry:

Si saubesson parlan mei oill, e.l cor, don tan soven sospir, tot saupras quals son mei consir; car la boca non a ges vassalatge de vos dire zo don lo cor languis. . .	If you knew to speak to my eyes, and to my heart, which so often sighs, soon you would know all my worries; for this the mouth has no authority to tell you for what the heart languishes. . .

Aimeric was probably patronised by William VIII of Montpellier. One of his works may have inspired Denis of Portugal to compose a poem in Portuguese.

== Sources ==
- The Vidas of the Troubadours. Margarita Egan, trans. New York: Garland, 1984. ISBN 0-8240-9437-9.
- Lang, H. R. "The Relations of the Earliest Portuguese Lyric School with the Troubadours and Trouvères." Modern Language Notes, 10:4 (Apr., 1895), pp. 104–116.
- Riquer, Martín de. Los trovadores: historia literaria y textos. 3 vol. Barcelona: Planeta, 1975.
