= Cossezen =

Italian troubadour

The earliest native Italian troubadour may be one called Cossezen (probably a nickname), the subject of one stanza of the famous satire of contemporary poets by Peire d'Alvernhe which must have preceded 1173. Of "Cossezen" Peire writes:

E.l dotzes us veilletz [or vielhs] Lombartz
que clama sos vezins coartz
et elh eis sent de l’espaven;
pero us sonetz fai gaillartz
ab motz maribotz e bastartz,
e lui apell’om Cossezen.

And the twelfth poet is an old Lombard
who calls his countrymen cowards
and feels the same about fear;
yet he composes small robust songs
with made-up and hybrid words,
and he is called Cossezen.

"Cossezen" is probably an ironic nickname, in light of his "bastard" (bastartz) diction, meaning "graceful, delicate". The Italian identity of this troubadour is predicated on his being "an old Lombard" and his use of "hybrid" words, possibly a reference to Italianisms. On the other hand, "Lombartz" was a common term of approbation for a miser or usurer during the period and may not refer to Cossezen's homeland. If Cossezen was, however, as seems more probable, a Lombard, it would make him the earliest Occitan lyric poet of Italian birth, though none of his work survives and there is no mention of him outside of Peire's satire.
