= Arnaut de Mareuil =

Troubadour, poet, composer and writer

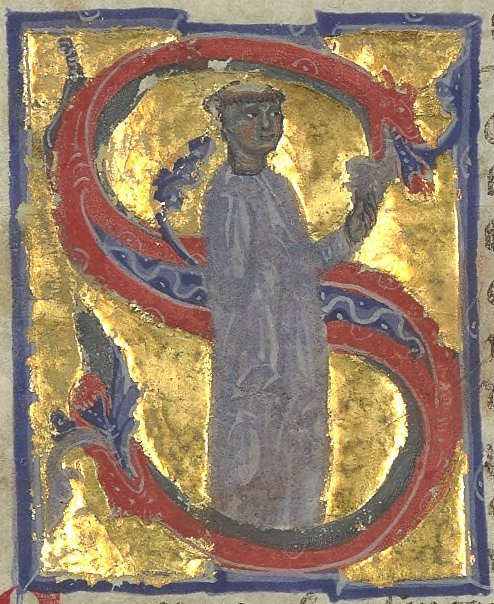
Arnaut standing amidst an initial S in a 13th-century chansonnier.

Arnaut de Mareuil (fl. late 12th century) was a troubadour, composing lyric poetry in the Occitan language. Twenty-five, perhaps twenty-nine, of his songs, all cansos, survive, six with music. According to Hermann Oelsner's contribution to the 1911 Encyclopædia Britannica, Arnaut de Mareuil surpassed his more famous contemporary Arnaut Daniel in "elegant simplicity of form and delicacy of sentiment". This runs against the consensus of both past and modern scholars: Dante, Petrarch, Pound and Eliot, who were familiar with both authors and consistently proclaim Daniel's supremacy.

His name indicates that he came from Mareuil-sur-Belle in Périgord. He is said to have been a "clerk" from a poor family who eventually became a jongleur; he settled at the courts of Toulouse and then Béziers. He apparently loved the countess Azalais, daughter of Raymond V of Toulouse, married to Roger II Trencavel, and Arnaut's surviving poems may be seen as a sequence (lyric cycle) telling of his love. Alfonso II of Aragon was his rival for Azalais's affections, and according to the razó to one of Arnaut's poems, the king jealously persuaded her to break off her friendship with Arnaut. He fled to Montpellier, where he found a patron in count William VIII. Arnaut's cantaire (singer) and jongleur (minstrel, messenger) was Pistoleta.
