= Peire Rogier =

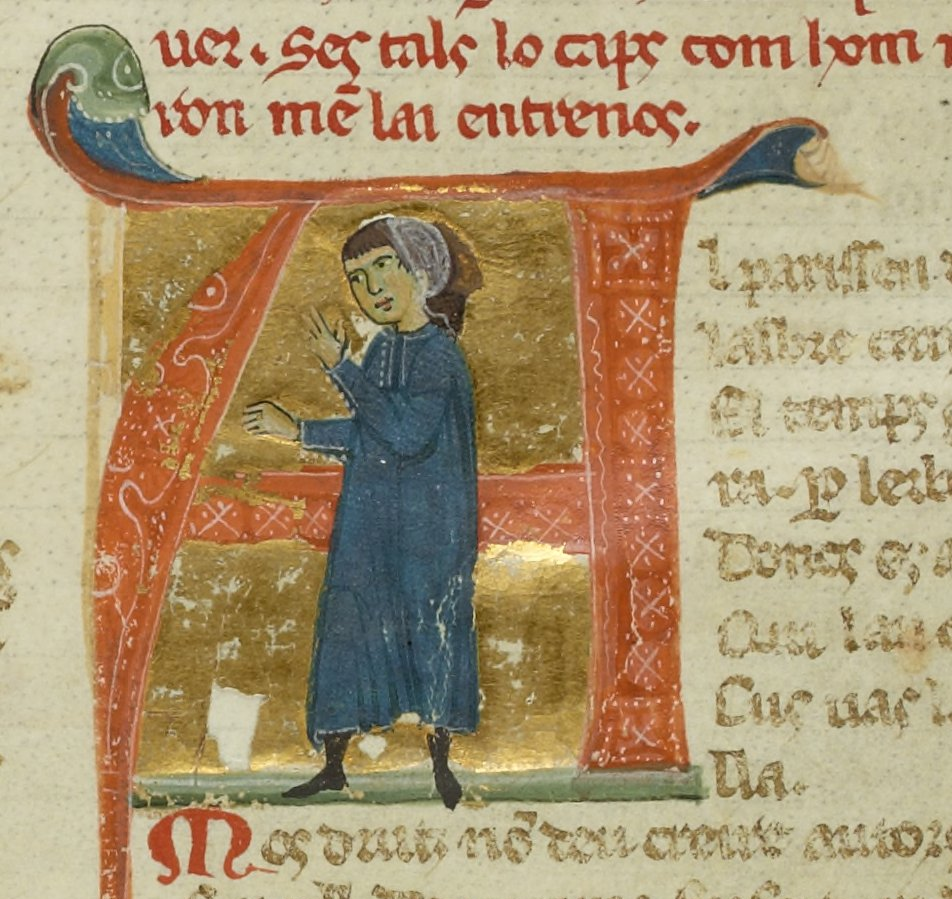
Peire as a young man Peire Rotgiers si fo d'Alvernhe, Canorgues de Clarmon. . . "Peire Rogier was from Auvergne, a canon of Clermont. . ."

Peire Rogier (Note: His second name is also spelled Rogiers or Rotgiers. He is sometimes called Peire Rogier d'Alvergna or Peire Rogier de Mirapeys(h). He is sometimes given as Pierre de Rougier in French, on the assumption that he was from Rouziers.) (born c. 1145) was a twelfth-century Auvergnat troubadour (fl. 1160 – 1180) and cathedral canon from Clermont. He left his cathedral to become a travelling minstrel before settling down for a time in Narbonne at the court of Viscountess Ermengard. His life and career are known because his late thirteenth-century vida survives, as well as some of his works. The reliability of his vida, upon which all the details of his goings and comings are known, however, is not complete. According to it, he left the religious life to become a jongleur.

He fell in love with his hostess and patron and wrote many songs in her honour, giving Ermengard the nickname Tort-n'avetz ("You are wrong"), but for what reasons is unknown. Eventually the people of the Narbonnaise believed that he was in a sexual relationship with the viscountess and so she asked him to leave. He moved on to the court of Raimbaut d'Aurenga, where he also remained for a long time. From Raimbaut's court he moved on to sojourn at that of Alfonso VIII of Castile, then that of Alfonso II of Aragon, and finally that of Raymond V of Toulouse, where he arrived circa 1170. According to his vida, he became much esteemed as a troubadour through his travels, but there is no evidence otherwise for any movements in Spain, except perhaps the assembly of troubadours at the court of Aragon mentioned in a work of Peire d'Alvernhe (which need not have taken place). He entered the Order of Grandmont before his death.

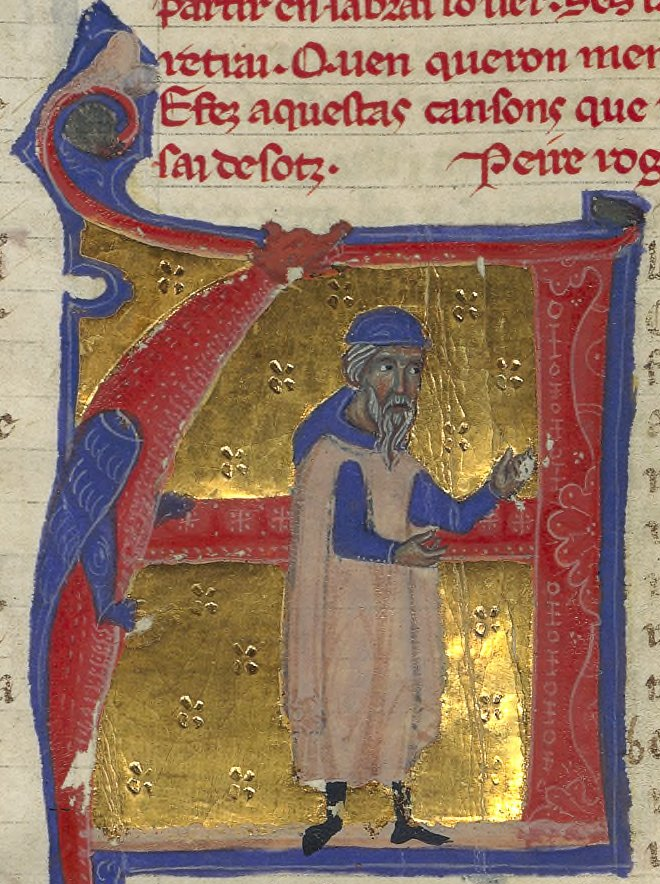
Peire as an old man

Peire Rogier's style of courtly love poetry is of the extremely reverent variety, in which the man submits completely to his lady and she is a paragon of virtue and courtliness (though the word cortezia is absent from his surviving works). She can by mere words convert a boorish man into a courtly one. Love need not be physical to be enjoyed and suffering on behalf of one's lady is considered pleasure. From one of his works:

Tant ai mon cor en joy assis,
per que no puesc mudar no'n chan,
que joys m'a noirit pauc e gran;
e ses luy non seria res,
qu'assatz vey que tot l'als qu'om fay
abaiss' e sordey' e dechai,
mas so qu'amors e joys soste.

My heart is so fixed on joy
that I cannot help but sing,
for as a child and an adult, joy has nourished me.
Without it, I’d be nothing.
I see that everything else that people do
degrades, dishonors, and defames
if love and joy do not sustain it.

He has been alleged as the author of the Roman de Flamenca, but as this was written around 1234–1235, he would have done so while about ninety years of age, which is hardly likely. However, the author of the Flamenca probably imitated the dialogue of Peire Rogier's poems. As the originator of internal dialogue in the troubadour lyric, Peire Rogier was also imitated by Guiraut de Bornelh.

== Sources ==
- Cheyette, Fredric L. Ermengard of Narbonne and the World of the Troubadours. Ithaca: Cornell University Press, 2001. ISBN 0-8014-3952-3
- Pietsch, K. "The Authorship of Flamenca." Modern Language Notes, Vol. 10, No. 7. (Nov., 1895), pp 201–202.
- Henckels, Théodore. "The Authorship of Flamenca." Modern Language Notes, Vol. 10, No. 5. (May, 1895), pp 158–159.
- Pattison, Walter T. "The Troubadours of Peire D'Alvernhe's Satire in Spain." PMLA, Vol. 50, No. 1. (Mar., 1935), pp 14–24.
- Denomy, Alexander J. "Courtly Love and Courtliness." Speculum, Vol. 28, No. 1. (Jan., 1953), pp 44–63.
- Mott, Lewis F. "The Love Theories of Chrétien de Troies." PMLA, Vol. 8, Appendix. Proceedings of the Eleventh Annual Meeting of the Modern Language Association of America, 1893. (1893), pp xxvii–xxxi.
