= Marcabru =

Medieval troubadour

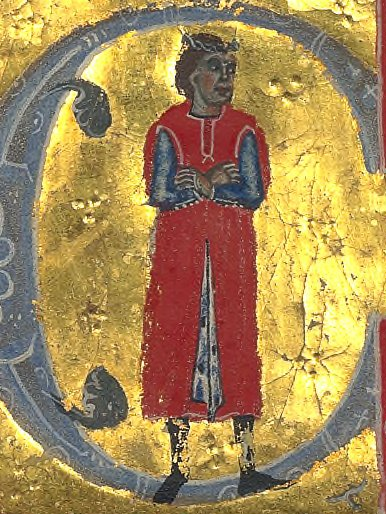
A miniature portrait of Marcabru beside his vida in a 13th-century chansonnier.

Marcabru (Occitan pronunciation: [maɾkaˈβɾy]; fl. 1130–1150) is one of the earliest troubadours whose poems are known. There is no certain information about him; the two vidas attached to his poems tell different stories, and both are evidently built on hints in the poems; not on independent information.

According to the brief life in the BnF ms. 12473, Marcabrun was from Gascony (details of the dialect of his poems support this) and was the son of a poor woman named Marcabrunela. This evidently comes from a reading of poem 293,18.

According to the longer biography in MS. Vat. Lat. 5232 Marcabru was abandoned at a rich man's door, and no one knew his origin. He was brought up by Aldric del Vilar, learned to make poetry from Cercamon, and was at first nicknamed Pan-perdut (Note: This nickname may come from pannem perditum (vagabond) or panem perditum (breadless). "Bread" is probably a sexual innuendo. In Middle French, pain perdu is fried bread, while in Catalan panperdut means simpleton. Many town quarters are recorded with the name Panperdut. Marcabru himself refers to guasta-pa (bread spoilers) and to pa del fol (fool's bread, probably an allusion to Psalm 52) in two poems.) and later Marcabru. He became famous, and the lords of Gascony, about whom he had said many bad things, eventually put him to death. This appears to be based on poems 16b,1 and 293,43 (an exchange between Aldric del Vilar and Marcabru) and guesswork; the link with Cercamon is doubted by modern scholars.

Forty-four poems are attributed to Marcabru, learned, often difficult, sometimes obscene, and relentlessly critical of the morality of lords and ladies. He experimented with the pastorela, a parodic genre which he uses to point out the futility of lust. One, L’autrer jost’una sebissa tells of how the speaker's advances are reviled by a shepherdess on the basis of class, and survives with music. Another tells of how a man's attempt to seduce a woman whose husband was at the crusades is firmly rebuffed. He may also have originated the tenso in a debate with Uc Catola (as early as 1133) on the nature of love and the decline of courtly behaviour. Marcabru was a powerful influence on later poets who adopted the obscure trobar clus style. Among his patrons were William X of Aquitaine and, probably, Alfonso VII of León. Marcabru may have travelled to Spain in the entourage of Alfonso Jordan, Count of Toulouse, in the 1130s. In the 1140s, he was a propagandist for the Reconquista and in his famous poem with the Latin beginning Pax in nomine Domini! he called Spain a lavador (washer) where knights could go to have their souls cleansed fighting the infidel.

Four monophonic melodies to accompany Marcabru's poetry survive; additionally, three melodies of poems that may be contrafacta of Marcabru's work may be attributed to him.

== Sources ==
- Marcabru (2018). M. Albertazzi (ed.). Liriche (in Old Provençal and Italian). Lavis: La Finestra editrice. ISBN 978-8895925-86-8.
- Barton, Simon (1997). The Aristocracy in Twelfth-Century León and Castile. Cambridge: Cambridge University Press. ISBN 0-521-49727-2.
- Gaunt, Simon (1989). Troubadours and Irony. Cambridge: Cambridge University Press. ISBN 0-521-35439-0.
- Gaunt, Simon; Harvey, Ruth; Paterson, Linda M., eds. (2000). Marcabru: A Critical Edition. D. S. Brewer.
