= Cadenet (troubadour) =

Provençal troubadour

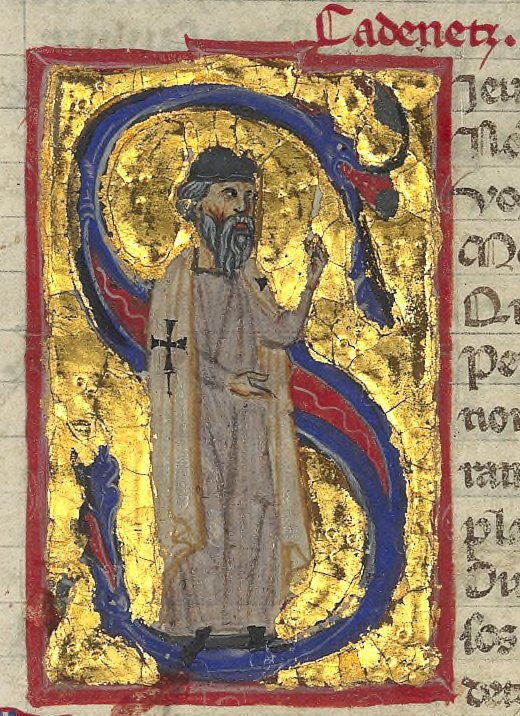
Cadenet portrayed as a Knight Hospitaller in a 13th-century French chansonnier

Cadenet (c. 1160 – c. 1235) was a Provençal troubadour (trobador) who lived and wrote at the court of Raymond VI of Toulouse and eventually made a reputation in Spain. Of his twenty-five surviving songs, twenty-one (or twenty-three) are cansos, with one alba, one partimen, one pastorela, and one religious piece represented. Two of his melodies survive.

== Life ==
During Cadenet's childhood Raymond V of Toulouse and Bertrand I of Forcalquier went to war over the Vaucluse. Cadenet's father was killed in battle fighting for the count of Forcalquier and the castle of Cadenet was destroyed. Cadenet was taken captive or as a hostage to the court of Toulouse, where he became known after his birthplace, a term which also mean "juniper grove" (cade is Occitan for "juniper"). He rose to prominence in the court under the patronage of several prominent families with close connections to the Cathar movement. According to his late thirteenth-century vida, "... et el venc bos e bels et courtes e saup ben cantar e parlar, et apres a trobar coblas e sirventes." He became a devoted attendant of the count and countess of Toulouse.

His cansos celebrate love but also criticise the feudal lords for their less admirable behaviour. He was only full of praise for lauzengiers, the spies and eavesdroppers who forced lovers into ever more secrecy. He wrote one sirventes criticising Raymond Roger Trencavel for his poor manners on a visit to the court of the count of Toulouse in 1204. This sirventes is a useful source for the relationship between Toulouse and the Trencavel on the eve of the Albigensian Crusade, as it was written for a contemporary audience and dealt with personal issues. Cadenet also wrote a famous early alba, S'anc fu belha ni prezada, whose music (air) and lyrics are still preserved. The music is of the style of an oda continua hymn. In some of his writings, modern researches have thought to detect the influence of Cathar doctrine. His famous Lo ben e lo mal (The Good and the Bad) divulges a deep sense of guilt towards God and a desire to swap evil and good:

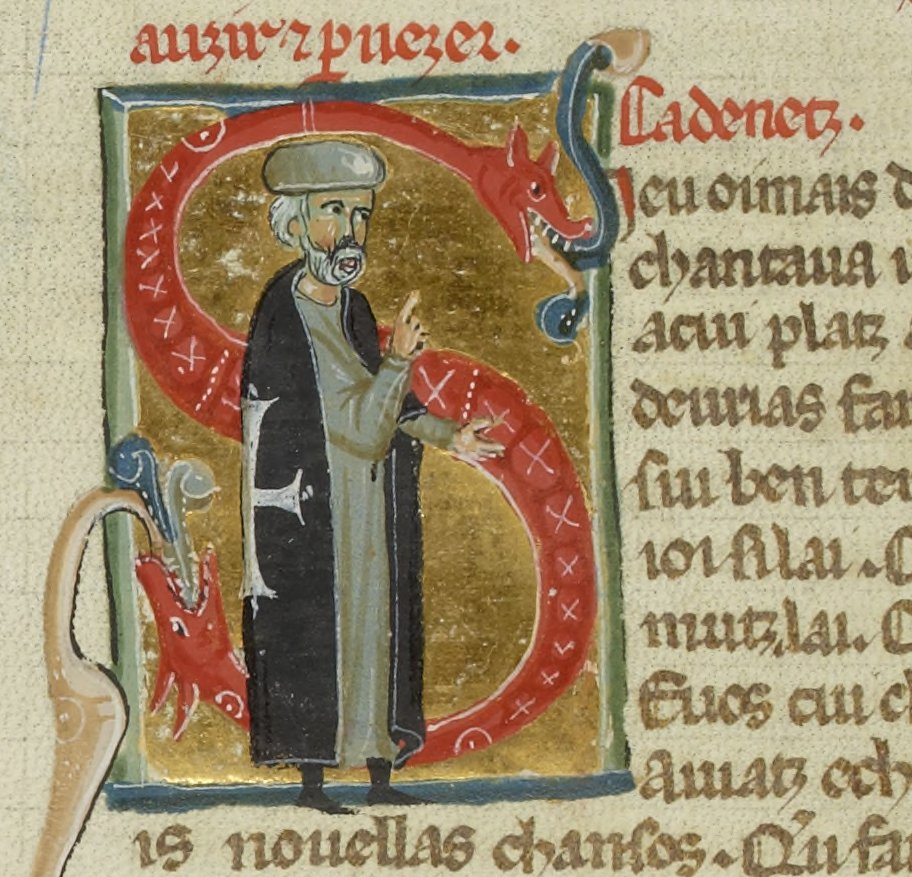
Another chansonnier portraying Cadenet as an old man and a Hospitaller

Ben volgra s'esser pogues
tot lo mal qu'ai fait desfar
eˑl be que non ai fait far
Ai! com m'en fora ben pres
siˑl bes fos mals e mals fos bes. . .
Tant mi sent vas Dieu mespres
qu'eu me cugei deseperar.

I would like, if it could be,
To destroy all the evil which I have made
And do all the good which I have not done
Ah! because it would be pleasing to me
If the good were evil and the evil good. . .
So guilty I feel towards God
That I believe I might despair.

Elsewhere the learned Cadenet borrowed a Classical metaphor, that of the "boat of love, ploughing through the rough weather" from Ovid, and wrote Plus que la naus q'es en la mar prionda / Non had poder de far son dreg viatge. Cadenet elsewhere employs simile and metaphor to compare a beautiful but difficult woman to a pretty flower without seed:

Car es delida
leu flors, on mieills es florida;
q'ela se fraing per nïen
qand so qe mostra desmend.

After the Crusade and the Inquisition, Cadenet took refuge in Spain (either Castile or Aragon, c. 1230), where he had an influence on the court of Alfonso X of Castile. Alfonso's cantiga Virgen, madre gloriosa adapts metric elements from Cadenet's alba. Late in life, after an unhappy falling in love with a novice nun, sources differ as to whether he entered either the Order of the Temple or the Order of the Hospital. He appears to have been serving with the Order in Palestine when he died around 1230, though other sources place him in the Hospitaller establishment at Orange in 1239.

The first modern critical edition of Cadenet's work was published by Carl Appel in German as Der Trobador Cadenet in 1920.
