= Senhal =

A senhal is a codename used to address ladies, patrons and friends in the Old Occitan poetry of the troubadours. Only a minority of persons addressed by senhal have been identified, the rest being subject to much speculation.

Senhals are usually found in the tornadas of poems. They could be nouns, adjectives or phrases. They were usually expressions of admiration, longing or joy, as in Bel vezer (beautiful gaze), Mon desir (my desire) and Gen conquis (nobly conquered). Occasionally they are humorous or deprecating, as in Tort n'avetz (you are wrong).

Senhals appear in the earliest troubadours works, those of Duke William IX of Aquitaine in the early twelfth century. Early poets employed different senhals for different addressees, but later poets used the same senhals repeatedly for different referents. Their use continued into the fourteenth century in the works of Raimon de Cornet. Guilhem Molinier's prose Leys d'amors states as a rule that troubadours should adopt their own senhals, which thus functioned more as signatures of the poets than identifiers of others.

The origin of the senhal has been much debated. It has been linked by Martín de Riquer to classical practice, as in the case of the Lesbia of Catullus or the Cynthia of Propertius. It has also been linked to the practice of nicknames at the court of Charlemagne and to the kināya of contemporary Andalusi poetry.
