= Alfred Jeanroy =

French linguist (1859-1953)

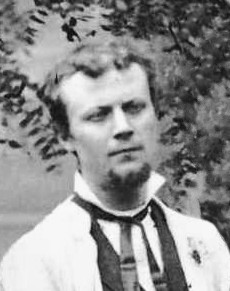
- Born: 5 July 1859; Mangiennes, Meuse
- Died: 13 March 1953 (aged 93); Paris
- Occupation: Linguist

Alfred Jeanroy (5 July 1859 – 13 March 1953) was a French linguist.

Jeanroy was a leading scholar studying troubadour poetry, publishing over 600 works. He established an influential view of the second generation of troubadours divided into two camps: “idealists” (e.g. Jaufre Rudel, Ebles de Ventadorn) and “realists” (e.g. Marcabru).

== Selected works ==
- 1893: Mystères provençaux du quinzième siècle, publié avec une introduction et un glossaire par A. Jeanroy et H. Teulié, Toulouse, Privat.
- 1913: Les chansons de Guillaume IX, duc d’Aquitaine: (1071–1127), Paris, Champion.
- 1914: Les Joies du Gai Savoir: Recueil de poésies couronnées par le consistoire de la Gaie Science (1324–1484), publ. avec la trad. de J. B. Noulet, rev. et corr.; une introd., des notes et un glossaire, Toulouse, Privat / Paris, Picard.
- 1922: Les Poésies de Cercamon, Paris, Champion.
- 1924: La geste de Guillaume Fièrebrace et de Rainouart au Tinel, d’après les poèmes des XIIe et XIIIe siècles, de Boccard, Paris.
- 1925: Les origines de la poésie lyrique en France au moyen age: études de littérature française et comparée, suivies de textes inédits, Paris: H. Champion, 3.ª ed.
- 1927: Anthologie des troubadours, XIIe-XIIIe siècles. Introduction, traductions et notes par Alfred Jeanroy.
- 1934: La poésie lyrique des troubadours, Toulouse, Privat / Paris, Didier.
- 1945: Histoire sommaire de la poésie occitane. Des origines à la fin du XVIIIe, Toulouse, Privat / Paris, Didier.
- 1957: Jongleurs et troubadours gascons des XIIe et XIIIe siècles, Paris, Champion.
