= Guilhem Peire Cazals de Caortz =

Guilhem Peire Cazals de Caortz or Guilhem Peire de Cazals was a troubadour of the first half of the thirteenth century. He was born or lived in Cahors, Quercy, from which his name "de Caortz". Eleven of his works, including one tenso, survive.

The only sure way to date Guilhem Peire's life and work is by his tenso with Bernart de la Barta, who was alive in 1229, and by a sirventes of Guilhem Figueira, Un nou sirventes ai en cor que trameta, composed in 1240, which mirrors D'una leu chanso ai cor que m'entremeta, a canso by Guilhem Peire, in metre and rhyme and therefore gives a terminus ante quem for the tenso's composition.

Nine of Guilhem Peire's poems are dedicated to a certain friend and jongleur known only by the affectionate senhal Ardit. Generally he wrote in the trobar ric genre, and in his leu chanso (canso in the trobar leu, referred to above) he mentions using words are opposite to the courtly norm to describe the lover that abandoned him that. Guilhem Peire was also one of the earliest poets to adopt the sestina form of Arnaut Daniel: his Eras, pus vey mon benastruc imitates the Arnaut's mots-refranh. In it the poet is rather optimistic because his lady has shown him favour.

== Sources ==
- Riquer, Martín de. Los trovadores: historia literaria y textos. 3 vol. Barcelona: Planeta, 1975.
