= Barta =

Barta may refer to:

== Places and transportation ==
- Barta, Bangladesh, a village in southern-central Bangladesh
- Barta'a, a town that straddles Israel and the West Bank
- Bārta parish, an administrative unit in Latvia
- Bārta, a river in Latvia and Lithuania
- Barta, a tributary of the river Asău (Trotuș) in Romania
- Plavni, Odesa Oblast, a village in Ukraine known as Barta by its majority Romanian population
- Berks Area Regional Transportation Authority, a public transportation system in Berks County, Pennsylvania, United States

== People ==
- Bárta/Barta, a surname
- Pen name of David Korner (1914–1976), Romanian and French communist militant, trade unionist and journalist
- Berta people, ethnic group in Ethiopia and Sudan
  - Berta languages, language family
    - Berta language, the main language of the language family
- Territory inhabited by the Bartians, an extinct Prussian tribe

== See also ==
- Bartas
