= Gavaudan =

Troubadour and soldier of the Reconquista

- Born: Gévaudan, France
- Other names: Gavaudas, Gavauda, le Vieux
- Occupations: Troubadour, soldier
- Years active: c. 1195–1215
- Era: Reconquista
- Employer(s): Raymond V, Raymond VI
- Known for: Pastorelas and crusade song
- Notable work: Senhors, per los nostres peccatz

Gavaudan (fl. c. 1195 – 1215, known in 1212–1213) was a troubadour and hired soldier (soudadier) at the courts of both Raymond V and Raymond VI of Toulouse and later on in Castile. He was from Gévaudan, as his name (probably a nickname) implies. He wrote moralising lyrics, either religious or political, and ten of his works survive, including five sirventes, two pastorelas, one canso, one planh for an anonymous domna (lady), and one Crusade song. He is sometimes clumped in a primitive Marcabrunian "school" of poetry alongside Bernart Marti, Bernart de Venzac, and Peire d'Alvernhe. He developed a hermetic style, combining elements of the trobar ric and trobar clus.

== Pastorelas ==
Gavaudan composed two pastorelas customarily dated to around 1200: Desamparatz, ses companho and L'autre dia, per un mati. They are one of the earliest and best examples of a subgenre of pastorela that, picking up on the themes of the earliest pastorelas, in which quaint shepherdesses were easily seduced by noble men, and those of Marcabru and his school, wherein the witty shepherdesses rebuff the oafish knights, intermingled the two earlier themes into one, in which the shepherdess and the knight fall in love. In Gavaudan, the knight and the shepherdess turn to each other in retreat from the dreariness of their normal lives, and their love is true, but not courtly love.

Gavaudan perceived himself as an innovator, as his poem Ieu no sui pars als autres trobadors ("I am not like other troubadours") indicates. That poem is the "manifesto" of his poetry, and in it he declares that his work is only meant to be clear als bos entendedors: "to good listeners (i.e. those who understand well)".

== Crusade song ==
Gavaudan's Crusade song, Senhors, per los nostres peccatz, has been variously dated to either 1195 or 1210–1212. The nature of the song is an "invocation to the whole of Christendom" to take up the Reconquista in Spain. It was definitely written after the fall of Jerusalem to Saladin in 1187, since it refers to that event. If it was written in 1195, it was probably before the Battle of Alarcos on 19 July, where Alfonso VIII of Castile was defeated by the Almohad caliph, Abu Jusuf. Gavaudan mentions Alfonso VIII in another song, Lo vers dech far en tal rima.

The later date (1210–1212) places the songs on the eve of the Battle of Las Navas de Tolosa (16 July 1212). Considering that Abdullah Muhammad al-Nasir, Abu Jusuf's successor, had crossed into Andalusia on 16 March 1211, it is probable that the song was written between that date and the battle. Support for the later date comes from an allusion in the poem to the taunts of the reys de Marroc ('king of Morocco'), which probably refers to al-Nasir's boast that he would march all the way to Rome and cleanse Saint Peter's Basilica with Mohammed's sword. Gavaudan probably felt personally threatened by this, since the march to Rome would undoubtedly pass through Occitania, thus the Moors of his poem say Franc, faiz nos loc; / nostr'es Proensa e Tolzas, / entro al Puey totz los mejas: "Frank, make us room; / ours are Provence and Toulouse, / as far as Le Puy the whole country in between."

Evidence that the Crusade song can be placed after Alarcos is the sentiment expressed in lines 51–54 that the Spanish states between Occitania and the Moors have been defeated and the men north of the Pyrenees must therefore take the Reconquista into their hands. Gavaudan mentions Alamans, Frances, Cambrezis, / Engles, Bretos et Angevis, / Biarns, Gascos ab nos mesclatz / el.s Provensals . . . ("Germans, Frenchmen, men of Cambrai / Englishmen, Bretons and Angevins, / Béarnais, Gascons with us mixed / the Provençals . . ."). This last reference also places Gavaudan in a Provençal contingent already with Alfonso in Spain; his sirventes was written to the audience back home, in hopes that they would come join the effort against the Moors. A date of January 1212 has been postulated in order to give Gavaudan enough time for his poem to have its effect. Some scholars (Saverio Guida, for instance) have defended a dating of 1196–1197. The tornada of the poem contains Gavaudan's prediction for the outcome of the engagement:

Profeta sera.n Gavaudas qu.el dig er faitz, e mortz als cas! e Dieus er honratz e servitz on Bafometz era grazitz.	Gavaudan shall be a prophet for his words shall become a fact. Death to those dogs! God shall be honoured and worshipped where Mahomet is now served.

== Albigensian Crusade ==
Only one of Gavaudan's songs besides Senhor, per nostres peccatz can be dated with any confidence: A la plus longa nuech de l'an. In this song, Gavaudan verbally defends the count of Toulouse, then Raymond VI, from the Albigensian Crusade being waged against him. Three references situate it in time (c. 1213) and place (Toulouse). One reference is to the count as ducx, coms, marques ("duke, count, margrave"), a triple title which referred to the fact that the counts of Toulouse were also Dukes of Narbonne and Margraves of Provence. A second reference is to a "foolish white people", almost certainly the White Brotherhood, a militia established in Toulouse by Folquet de Marselha, erstwhile troubadour and then bishop, in 1211 to quell heresy. The third reference is to he "from whom part of his legitimate overlordship is withdrawn", probably an allusion to Simon de Montfort the Elder, who in January 1213 had been reprimanded by Pope Innocent III for seizing the County of Comminges and Viscounty of Béarn "under the cloak of religion".

== Works ==
- A la pus longa nuech de l'an
- Crezens, fis, verays et entiers
- Dezamparatz, ses companho
- Ieu no suy pars als autres trobadors
- L'autre dia, per un mati
- Lo mes e·l temps e l'an deparc
- Lo vers dech far en tal rima
- Patz passien ven del Senhor
- Senhors, per los nostres peccatz
- Un vers vuelh far, chantador
