= Raimon de Cornet =

Toulousain priest, friar, grammarian, poet and troubadour

Joan's text is the prose text at the top. Raimon's text is the verse on the bottom.

Raimon de Cornet (Occitan pronunciation: [rajˈmun de kuɾˈnet], also spelled Ramon de Cornet; fl. 1324–1340) was a fourteenth-century Toulousain priest, friar, grammarian, poet, and troubadour. He was a prolific author of verse; more than forty of his poems survive, most in Occitan but two in Latin. He also wrote letters, a didactic poem (sometimes classed as the last ensenhamen), a grammar, and some treatises on computation (i.e. practical mathematics). He was the "last of the troubadours" and represented l'esprit le plus brillant (the most brilliant spirit) of the "Toulousain School". He appears in contemporary documents with the titles En (sir, also mossen) and Frare (brother, also fray, frai, or frayre).

Raimon's magnum opus is his Doctrinal de trobar (doctrines of composition) composed around 1324 and dedicated to Peter, Count of Ribagorza. The Doctrinal follows the grammar put forward later by the Consistori del Gay Saber of Guilhem Molinier and it is structurally identical to Guilhem's Leys d'Amors. Both works spend a good deal of space quoting illustrative passages from the greatest troubadours of the past. The Doctrinal is considered the first work of the Gay Saber tradition. In a passage praising the pleasure of poetry, Raimon lists many of the traditional genres, which he and others like him had helped to define:

Dont tug que may tot jorn prendo plazer. . .
Verses, chansos, siruentes, pastorelas,
Dansas, descortz, redondels, viandelas,
Am bel so gay, melodios, plazen,
Balan, trescan o lors obran fazen;
E motas vetz, per fugir ad enueg,
Per los jorns loncz, o can fa longa nueg,
Legen dictatz, gestas o bels romans.

Translation:

From which a great number of people always take pleasure. . .
verses, chansos, sirventes, pastorelas,
dansas, descortz, redondels, viandelas,
with pretty tunes, gay, melodious, and pleasurable,
as they dance and leap around or do their work;
and, frequently, to raise their spirits
on long days, or when the nights are long,
they read verses, tales or romances.

Raimon strongly supported the Crusaders and bitterly opposed the clergy, Avignon Papacy, and eventually Philip VI of France. He wrote two "Crusade songs". The earlier one was composed in 1332, when Philip VI announced his intention of going on Crusade in July. Raimon suggests that the king should impose a tax on those men who do not join the Crusade, and in any case those who remain in France should pray two or three times daily for those who do go to the Holy Land. He notes that missionaries will inevitably accompany the host and attempt to convert the "Saracens". The second song, composed in 1336, is an attack on Philip for not completing his promised Crusade.

Raimon's poem Quar mot orne fan vers contains the earliest reference to basse danse. In describing the profession of the jongleurs he notes that they rapidly pick up the bassas dansas. This reference predates any other by a century.

Eighteen of Raimon's lyric poems are preserved in the final, unfinished folios of the Cançoner Gil, known as troubadour MS Sg or Z, now MS 146 in the Biblioteca de Catalunya in Barcelona. In 1341, possibly in Raimon's lifetime, the Catalan poet Joan de Castellnou wrote a Glosari al Doctrinal de Ramon de Cornet, a gloss on the Doctrinal.

== Works in the Cançoner Gil ==
Canços

- "Al mes d'abril can veyrez nutg los camps"
- "Le mieus saber ioy deziran se pert"
- "Ara·s fos hieu si malautz e cotxatz"
- "Intrar vuyll en guerrejar si puch tan"
- "Cars motz gentils fons e grans mars d'apteza"
- "Cent castels e cent tors"
- "En aycel tems com no sen fretg ni cauma" (titled "Saumesca")
- "Amors corals me fay deios un cas" (called a canso)

Sirventes

- "Jus en la font de cobeytat se bayna"
- "Totz temps azir falsetatz ez engan"
- "Qui dels escachs vol belamen iogar" (com deu hom jogar als escachs)

Vers (poems)

- "Car vey lo mon de mal pugat al cim"
- "Pauc homes vey de sen tan freyturos"
- "Raso ni sens no pot vezer lo moble"
- "Ben es vilas e mals e rustichs"
- "Ab tot mon sen d'amors si pusch faray"

Tenço

- "Pres mes talens d'un pech partimen far" with Arnau Alaman, donzel d'Albi

Unclassified

- "A Sent Marcel d'Albeges, prop de Salaç"
