= Bernart de Venzac =

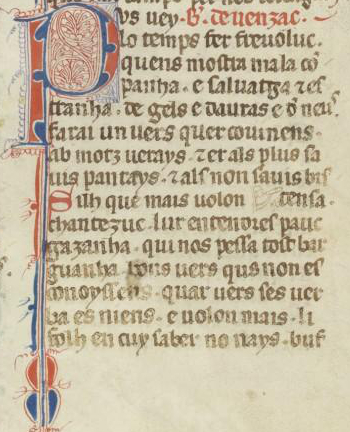
Bernart de Venzac Pus vey lo temps fer, frevoluc BNF Français ms.856 f.258r

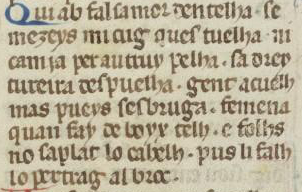
Bernart de Venzac Qui ab fals'amor dentelha BNF ms.856 f.259v

Bernart de Venzac (fl. 1180–1210) was an obscure troubadour from Venzac near Rodez in the Rouergue. He wrote in the Marcabrunian style, leaving behind five moralising pieces (two cansos and three sirventes) and one religious alba. Two of his works were confused by copyists with those of Marcabru in some manuscripts.

Bernart's career can be dated because of references in his poetry to his patron, Hugh II of Rodez. In his poem Iverns vay e.l temps tenebros he even prays to his recently deceased patron requesting him change any "false" words in his poem to the right ones: Prec que.l mot fals en sian ras / Pel compte N'Uc, en qui es dos. Whether this request was at all serious or merely a form of courtly flattery is not known, but the latter is suspected. Since Hugh died in 1208, this poem is usually dated to late that year or early 1209. Another reference, to the peace del bisb'e d'elh ("of the bishop and him [Hugh]"), probably refers to the concord reached between the count and the Bishop of Rodez in May 1195. For this reason, the poem is usually dated to late 1195 or early 1196, and Bernart's fluorit can be established from these two dates.

Bernart is sometimes clumped in a primitive Marcabrunian "school" of poetry alongside Bernart Marti, Gavaudan, and Peire d'Alvernhe. Like those of the "school", Bernart has much to say of "false love" (fals'amor), and he moralises on the right, courtly conduct of men:

Qui ab fals'amor dentelha
se mezeys me cuich que.s tuoilla
e camja per autrui pelhac
sa dreytureira despuoilla.

I believe that the man who consorts with false love steals
from himself and he changes his rightful attire for another's clothes.

Like Marcabru, Bernart also employs a complex ironic attack on cuckolds by portraying the object of their sexual liaisons as not the women they intend but rather their husbands. Bitter irony is a mainstay of Bernart's work. In general, his moralising consists in attacking the perceived corruption of society and the contemporary crisis of spiritual values. He makes a great deal of envy, greed, adultery, and pride. His language, however, is skilled and he employs a vocabulary at once popular, colourful, rich with rare words, and deeply expressive. Among the many unique words he used (and possibly invented) are esparpalh, frevoluc, frescum, and amarum. His poem Lanquan cort la doussa bia ("When the sweet breeze blows") is written in the trobar clus style.

To Bernart has been attributed an anonymous "prayer" to "Saint Mary of the Orient" in which the poet requests protection for King Philip Augustus and the Emperor Frederick Barbarossa as they embarked on the Third Crusade (1189). Nevertheless, the acrimony he displays towards his own society has incited a charge of Cathar elements in his writings (Maria Picchio Simonelli, 1975). He was an influence on Peire Cardenal.

== Sources ==
- Gaunt, Simon, and Kay, Sarah. "Appendix I: Major Troubadours" (pp. 279–291). The Troubadours: An Introduction. Simon Gaunt and Sarah Kay, edd. Cambridge: Cambridge University Press, 1999. ISBN 0-521-57473-0.
- Gaunt, Simon. Troubadours and Irony. Cambridge: Cambridge University Press, 1989. ISBN 0-521-35439-0.
- Riquer, Martín de. Los trovadores: historia literaria y textos. 3 vol. Barcelona: Planeta, 1975.
