= Raimon Jordan =

Occitan noble and troubadour

Raimon Jordan (fl. c. 1178–1195) was a Toulousain troubadour and the viscount of Saint-Antonin in the Rouergue near the boundary with Quercy. His poetry was in Old Occitan.

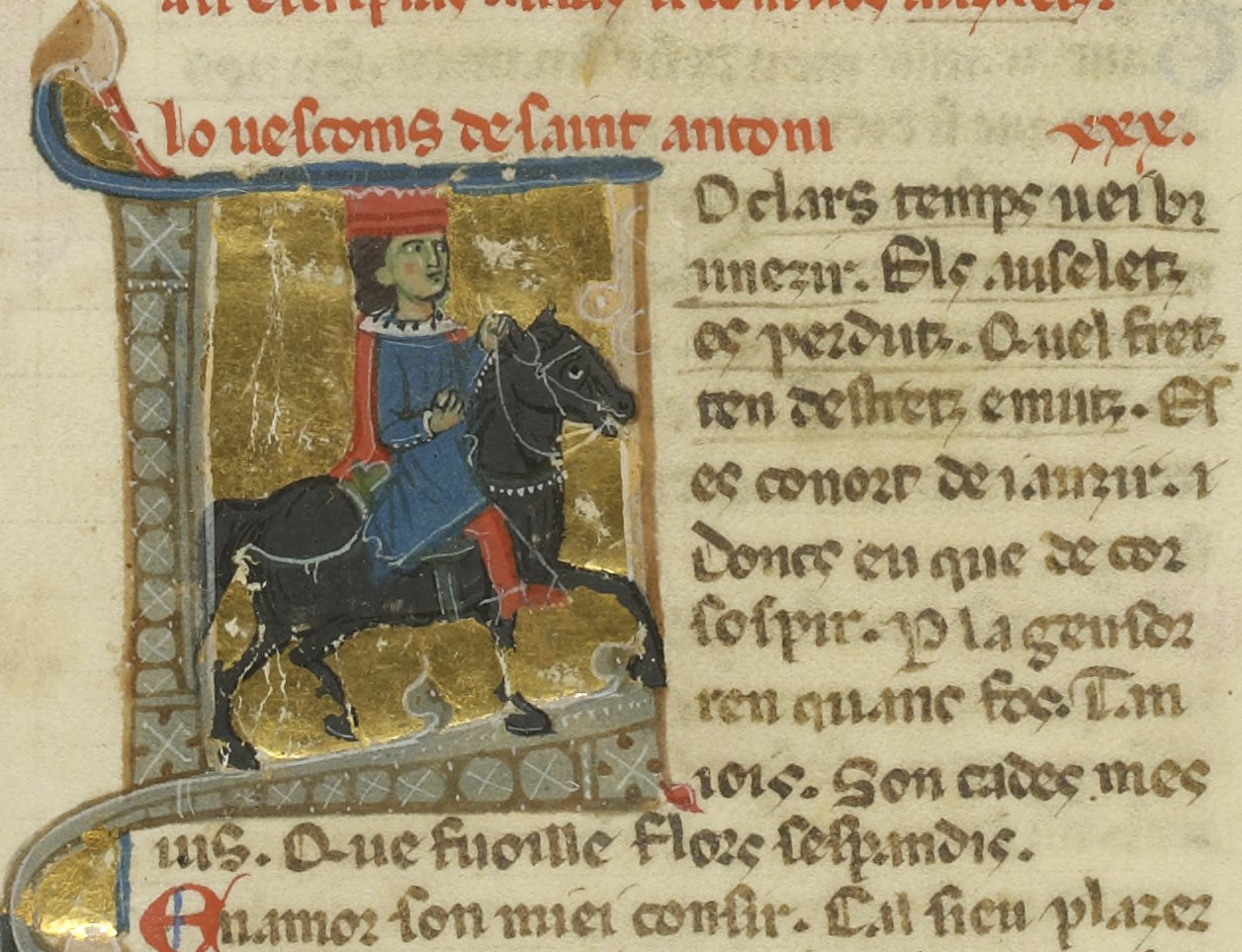
Raimon Jordan

There is a vida of Jordan which exists in several manuscripts, some with an accompanying razo. Like typical vidas, it tell us where he was from and whom he loved. He was from Pena d'Albeges (modern Penne). At some point he had a love affair with Elis (Lucia) de Montfort, wife of Guillem de Gordon (c. 1165) and then Bernart de Casnac (c. 1214). This affair was originally in a vida of Bertran de Born, but it was cut out and placed in Jordan's own vida-razo at a later date.

Jordan was a contemporary of Bertran and partook with him in the Revolt of 1173–1174 as a partisan of Henry the Young King against Henry Curtmantle, Duke of Aquitaine and King of England. He may have received a near fatal wound on the same campaign in which the Young King died in 1183. Jordan's own wife fell in with "heretics" (ereges), certainly Cathars, though one document calls them Patarics.

Of Jordan's literary output, twelve poems survive. They include eleven cansos and one tenso (and possibly a sirventes). The incipit found at the end of a razo introducing one of his cansos says maintas bonas chansos fetz: "he made many good cansos." The melody of Jordan's Vas vos soplei, domna, premieramen also survives. It was copied by the later troubadour Peire Cardenal for his Rics homs que greu ditz vertat e leu men. The most recent modern edition of his works is Il trovatore Raimon Jordan edited by Stefano Asperti (Modena: Mucchi, 1990).

Jordan's work is generally ahistorical and his poetry "suggests a jazz musician working over well-worn themes to move inexorably deeper into the poetic imagination." His innovations have led to comparisons with Thelonious Monk. Though Jordan is not usually regarded as a master by modern standards, the Monge de Montaudon, writing in the 1190s in the generation after him, gave him a high place in his Pos Peire d'Alvernh'a cantat. Jordan was one of the early troubadours to employ the mythology of the "wild man" in his poems. He refers to the "solace of the savage" (aissi farai lo conort del salvatge) and remarks that the expectation of joy makes him brave and that therefore he should better enjoy the snowfall rather than the blossoming of the flowers. In general Jordan's poetry emphasises the accompanying suffering of love and the stoic embrace of the suffering as a necessary consequence to be endured. The sufferings of love were compared to the buffeting of a tempestuous sea, a metaphor which was common enough in the literature of the time, when the sea was typically viewed as dangerous:

Com hom e mar quan se sent perilhar
Que dins son cor sospir'e dels olhs plora
E contra.l vent non pot nul genh trobar . . .

In another passage, Jordan explains that his song is an "interpreter" of his sorrows to the lady for whom he is suffering:

Si saubes cilh don m'agr'ops mantenensa
Tan coralmen me destrenho.l cossir, . . .
Mas ma chansos li sera latiniers,
A leis per cui fatz tan greu abstenensa.

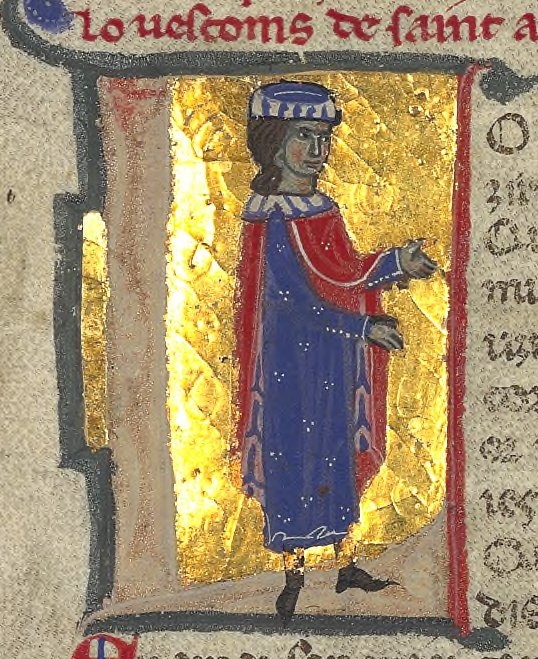
Raimon Jordan

Indeed, his devotion to a lady knew no bounds and he was a sacrilegious poet. In one of his more famous passages he exclaims that he would give up eternity in Paradise for one night with a certain lady:

Que tan la desir e volh
Que, s'er'en coita de mort,
Non queri'a a Deu tan fort
Que lai el seu paradis

M'aculhis

Com que'm des lezer
D'una noit ab leis jazer.

Jordan wrote one canso for performance by women. In it he attacks the misogyny of earlier troubadours (antic trobadors) who have "slandered and misled women in their love poems". The song also attacks a satirist for "adopting the manner of a preacher" for the express purpose of criticising women publicly. In the last stanza of the canso, the female performer says:

Que quascus hom deu razonar son fraire
E queia domna sa seror . . .
E s'ieu per so velh far razonamen
A las domnas, no m'o reptes nien.

For each man must reason with his brother,
And every woman with her sister . . .
And if I wish to reason with women,
Don't reprove me for it at all.

Otherwise, his work is characterised by "striking feudal metaphors."
