= Salh d'Escola =

Troubadour from Bergerac, France

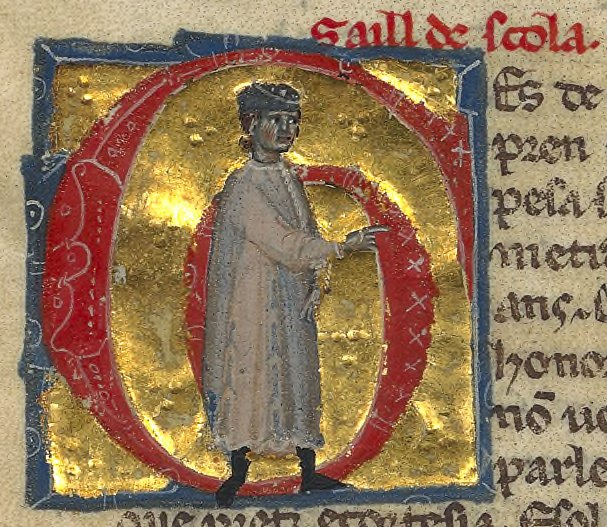
Salh's named is spelled "Saill de Scola" in the manuscript. Here he is depicted young.

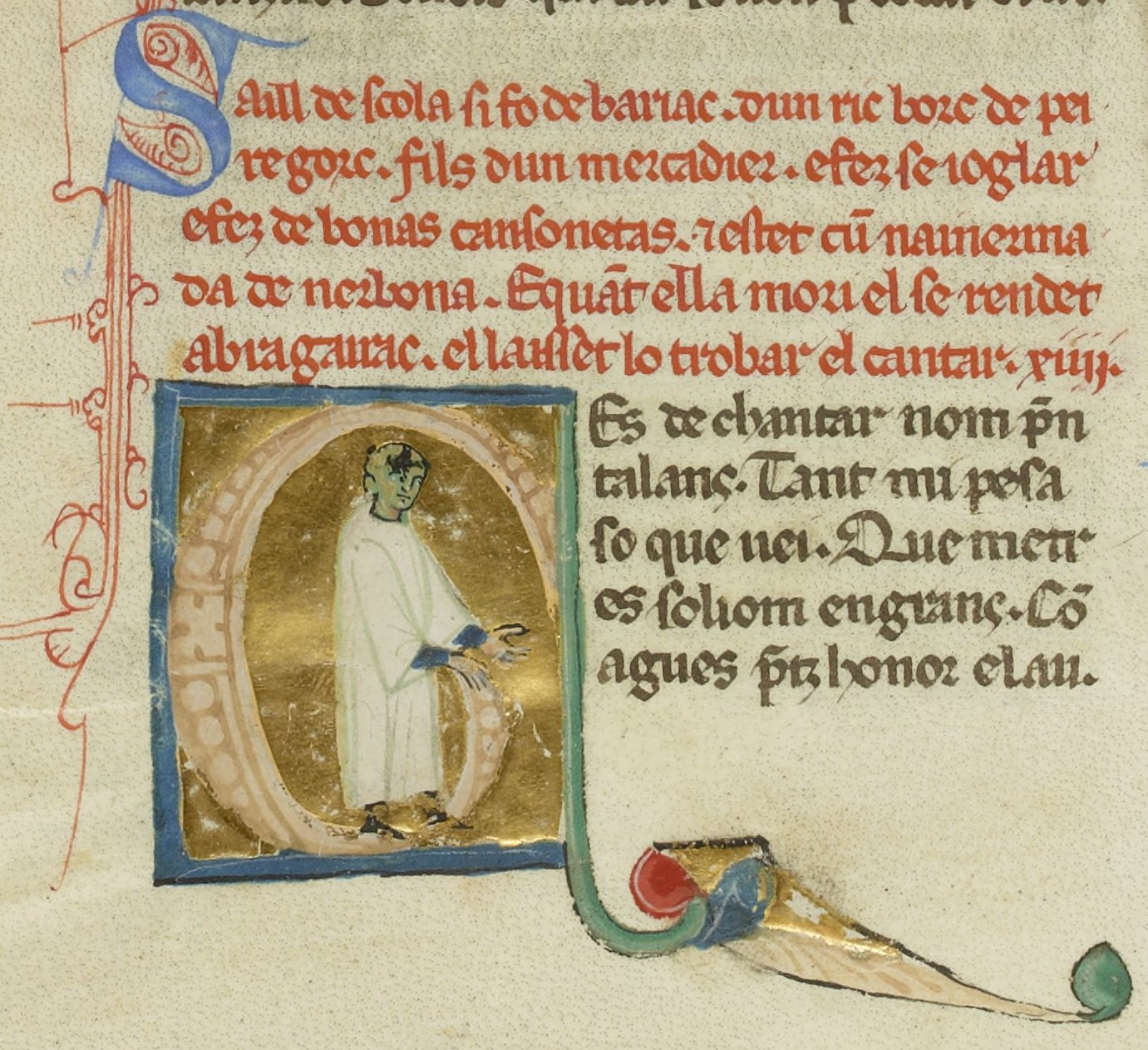
Salh depicted as a monk after abandoning his composing

Salh d'Escola (Occitan: [ˈsaʎ desˈkɔlɔ]; fl. 1195) was a troubadour from Bergerac in the Périgord, a former province of France. The meaning of his name, also spelled Sail or Saill, is uncertain; it may be an unusual given name. His surname, likewise, may be a family name, but there is no known location called "Escola" that could render it a toponymic. The entire name may be a nickname meaning "defector from school" or "escapee from the cloister", indicating that he quit his education, either in a school or a monastery. On the other hand, it may signify a pedant.

The details of Salh's life are provided in two main sources, one contemporaneous and one late. The first source is the poem "Pos Peire d'Alvernh′ a chantat" composed by the troubadour monk of Montaudon in 1195. In it he good-naturedly criticises a gallery of troubadours, each in turn, usually humorously. One of those criticised is Salh d'Escola. According to the monk, Salh was a jongleur who went to Bergerac and became a merchant. The later source is Salh's vida (a short biography), which probably relied on "Pos Peire d'Alvernh′" to piece together its story. According to the anonymous biographer, Salh was the son of a merchant and became a jongleur. He then went to Narbonne and stayed for a long time at the court of "Ainermada de Narbona", the Viscountess Ermengard of Narbonne. Upon her death (1197), Salh entered the cloister at Bergerac and abandoned his "inventing [songs] and singing".

Only one work by Salh, a canso (love song), has been preserved: "Gran esfortz fai qui chanta ni.s deporta". It is an amorous confession to his lady for telling her to "die" in a moment of desperation or irritation.

== Bibliography ==
- Egan, Margarita, ed. The Vidas of the Troubadours. New York: Garland, 1984. ISBN 0-8240-9437-9.
- Riquer, Martín de. Los trovadores: historia literaria y textos. 3 vol. Barcelona: Planeta, 1975.
