= Cantus coronatus =

In the late Middle Ages, a cantus coronatus (Latin for "crowned song") was a composition that had won a competition, and it or its composer been awarded a prize, often a crown. The corresponding Old French term was chanson couronnée or couronnez, which occurs is some extant chansonniers.

There are twelve trouvère chansons in the manuscripts with rubrics indicating they were awarded a crown. There are no discernible differences between such pieces and other trouvère works save that they were probably the recipients of prizes. The Occitan troubadour chansonnier called the Cançoner Gil contains eight songs which it says were coronada (crowned). Other songs that won prizes at various floral competitions are also indicated: one gazaynet la joia a Tholoza ("won the jewel at Toulouse"), another gazaynet la flor d'aglentina ... a Toloza ("won the eglantine rose at Toulouse"), and still another gazaynet la violeta ("won the violet").

In the musical theory of Johannes de Grocheio the cantus coronatus is class of popular music (musica vulgaris). After dividing the latter into the cantus and the cantilena, he subdivides each new category into three. The three forms of the cantus are the cantus gestualis (the chanson de geste), the cantus coronatus, and the cantus versiculatus (also called versicularis or versualis). The distinction between the latter two classes is not clear from the work, both being illustrated by examples from the trouvères. The distinguishing features of each class are described vaguely and Grocheio's subsequent comparison of popular music with ecclesiastical vitiates many of the distinctions (Ars musicae, 130:112):

Cantus coronati are normally composed by kings and nobles and they are frequently sung in the presence of kings and princes of the earth, in order that their souls may be moved to be daring and resolute, magnanimous and liberal, characteristics that all make for good rule. This kind of song is made from delightful and lofty material, as, for instance, when it is about friendship and charity, and is made entirely of perfect longas.
