= Bernart d'Auriac =

Bernat or Bernart d'Auriac was a minor troubadour notable mainly for initiating a cycle of five short sirventes in the summer of 1285. According to a rubric of the chansonnier in which the cycle is preserved, Bernart was a mayestre de Bezers (master of Béziers).

The sirventes cycle was prompted by the Aragonese Crusade and the French invasion of Spain. Bernart's speaks first and his pro-French stance marks him off as one of the school of Gallicised troubadours then active at Béziers and including Joan Esteve and Raimon Gaucelm. Bernart's sirventes prompted a response from Peter III of Aragon, the king defending from France's invasion, and who in turn was answered by a few coblas from Peire Salvatge. Peter's vassal Roger Bernard III of Foix, a longtime enemy of the French crown, wrote a response to Salvatge, and an anonymous contributor finished the cycle.

Besides his contribution to the cycle of 1285, Bernart has left three works of poetry: two cansos and another sirventes. The canso Be volria de la mellor was a religious song dedicated to the Virgin Mary and modelled on the metre and rhyme scheme of the love song Ben volria ser d'amor by Rigaut de Berbezilh. His other canso deals with courtly love. The sirventes En Guillems Fabres, sap fargar was dedicated to his friend and fellow troubadour Guillem Fabre.

== Sources ==
- Riquer, Martín de. Los trovadores: historia literaria y textos. 3 vol. Barcelona: Planeta, 1975.
