= Peire d'Alvernhe =

French troubadour

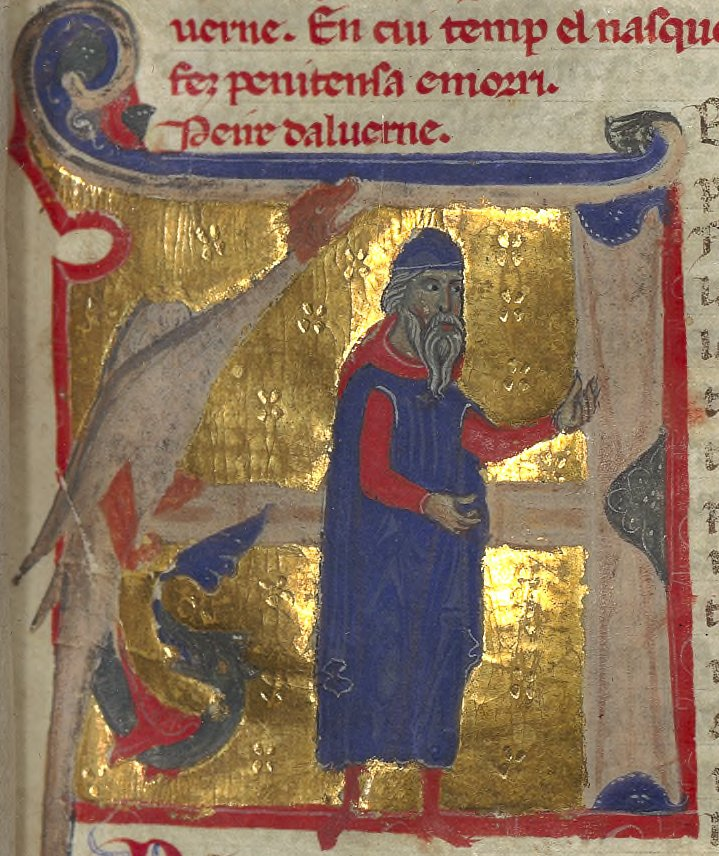
Peire d'Alvernhe as an old man.

Peire d'Alvernhe or d'Alvernha (Pèire in modern Occitan; b. c. 1130) was an Auvergnat troubadour (active 1149–1170) with twenty-one or twenty-four surviving works. He composed in an "esoteric" and "formally complex" style known as the trobar clus. He stands out as the earliest troubadour mentioned by name in Dante's Divine Comedy and De vulgari eloquentia.

== Life ==
According to his vida, Peire was a burgher's son from the Diocese of Clermont. As testified to by his vida, his popularity was great within his lifetime and afterwards. Said to be handsome, charming, wise, and learned, he was "the first good inventor of poetry to go beyond the mountains" (i.e. the Pyrenees) and travel in Spain. He passed his time in Spain at the court of Alfonso VII of Castile and that of his son Sancho III in 1157–1158. It is possible that he was present at a meeting between Sancho of Castile, Sancho VI of Navarre and Raymond Berengar IV of Barcelona in 1158. The author of his vida, editorialising, considers his poems to have been the greatest until Giraut de Borneill and his melodies to have been the best ever. The anonymous biographer records that his information about Peire's later years comes from Dalfi d'Alvernha. It has been suggested that Dalfi was the author of the vida.

According to an accusation of fellow troubadour Bernart Marti, Peire entered upon a religious life early, but quit Holy Orders for a life of itinerant minstrelsy. He may be the same person as the Petrus d'Alvengue and Petrus de Alvernia who appear in surviving documents from Montpellier dated to the year 1148. Peire appears to have cultivated the favour of the ruling family of the Crown of Aragon, and his poems contain allusions to the counts of Barcelona and Provence. Perhaps he was following the fashion of the lords of Montpellier of his time, who, though vassals of the Count of Toulouse, were partial to the Aragonese. At the same time, Peire did garner the support of Raymond V of Toulouse. In his wanderings he may have spent some time at Cortezon, at the court of the minor nobleman and troubadour Raimbaut d'Aurenga.

Peire lived a long time into old age and performed penance before dying.

== Poetry ==
Peire wrote mostly cansos, which, as his vida points out, were called vers in his day. He also invented the "pious song" and wrote six such poems dealing with serious themes of religion, piety, and spirituality. Even in his more profane works, however, one can detect the moralising influence of Marcabru, with whom in whose old age he was possibly acquainted. One of Marcabru's late songs is a satire of an early one by Peire d'Alvernhe. Marcabru's complexity was also imparted to Peire.

On the topic of courtly love, Peire, who had abandoned the religious life early, came to abandon the claims of fin'amor ("fine love") later. When Peire espouses love of the Holy Ghost over cortez' amors de bon aire ("well-spirited courtly love") he is the only troubadour to ever use the term "courtly love". Marcabrunian influence can be seen here too. In a later Crusade song, Peire defended Marcabru's abandonment of the carnal amar. He advocates gran sabres ni purs ("great and pure wisdom") through bon'amor ("good love"). Along with Bernart Marti, Bernart de Venzac, and Gavaudan, Peire was part of a "Marcabrunian school". Nonetheless, as mentioned above, Bernart Marti attacked Peire for claiming superior spiritual status:

E quan canorgues si mes
Pey d'Alvernh'en canongia,
a Dieu per que.s prometia
entiers que peuys si fraysses?
Quar si feys, fols joglars es
per que l'entiers pretz cambia.

Peire's aesthetic philosophy esteemed the "whole song" (vers entiers), which is what he termed his completed pieces, denigrating all others' works as incomplete and imperfect. Nonetheless, from Marcabru, Peire picked up a notion of the trobar braus as a legitimate format for "rough" themes.

One anonymous song of the Fifth Crusade, Lo Senhre que formet lo tro, written between Spring 1213 and July 1214, has been attributed to Peire d'Alvernhe, but the dating makes that impossible. In a tenso between a Bernart (probably Bernart de Ventadorn) and an unnamed Peire, perhaps Peire d'Alvernhe, the latter argues that "it is not becoming for ladies to make love-pleas; it is fitting that men plead with them and beg their mercy."

By far, however, Peire's most famous work is Chantarai d'aquest trobadors, a sirventes written at Puivert (Puoich-vert) in which he ridicules twelve contemporary troubadours ("a poetical gallery") and praises himself. It has been conjectured that this piece was first performed in the presence of all twelve of the ridiculed poets in late Summer 1170 while an embassy bringing Eleanor, daughter of Henry II of England, to her Spanish groom Alfonso VIII of Castile sojourned at Puivert. If the above date is not accepted, it can probably be dated later than 1165— since Giraut de Borneill was only active from c.1170— and certainly before 1173, when Raimbaut d'Aurenga died. The Monge de Montaudon later composed a parody of Peire's satire, Pos Peire d'Alvernhl a chantat.

Chantarai d'aquest trobadors is near universally regarded today as playful parody and not as a work of serious literary or artistic criticism. The obscurity of most of the ridiculed poets and the attack upon such personal characteristics as appearance and manners has been cited in support of the view that the parody was done in the presence of all twelve victims, further supporting the conclusion that the parody was good-natured. Besides the criticism of a personal nature, many of the criticisms launched by Peire allude to the works of others, notably those of Bernart de Ventadorn and Raimbaut d'Aurenga.

== Music ==
Peire's vida acclaimed him an accomplished singer and the greatest composer of melodies for verses yet known. Peire's famous Chantarai d'aquest trobadors contains a final tornada indicating its musical nature, though its own melody has not survived:

Lo vers fo faitz als enflabotz
a Puoich-vert to iogan rizen.

Translation:

This verse was made to the bagpipe
at Puivert with everyone playing and laughing.

Only two of Peire's melodies still exist: one of Dejosta.ls breus jorns e.ls lonc sers, a canso, and another of his tenso. Modern notations of both are provided in Aubrey, The Music of the Troubadours.

On the whole, Peire's music is more melismatic than that typical of the troubadours, and it mimics the trobar clus style of his lyrics.
