= Estampie =

Medieval dance and musical form

Estampie "Retrove"
Anonymous estampie from the Robertsbridge Codex, performed by Ulrich Metzner

The estampie (French: estampie, Occitan and Catalan: estampida, Italian: istanpitta) is a medieval dance and musical form which was a popular instrumental and vocal form in the 13th and 14th centuries. The name was also applied to poetry.

== Musical form ==
The estampie is similar in form to the lai, consisting of a succession of repeated notes. According to Johannes de Grocheio, there were both vocal and instrumental estampies (for which he used the Latin calque "stantipes"), which differed somewhat in form.

Grocheio calls the sections in both the French vocal and instrumental estampie puncta (singular punctus), Each puncta has a pair of lines that repeat the same melody, in the form:

aa, bb, cc, etc..

The two statements of the melody in each punctus differ only in their endings, described as apertum ("open") and clausum ("closed") by Grocheio, who believed that six puncta were standard for the stantipes (his term for the estampie), though he was aware of stantipes with seven puncta. The structure can therefore be diagrammed as:

a+x, a+y; b+w, b+z; etc..

In an instrumental estampie, the open and closed endings of the puncta are the same each time, so that the end of the punctum serves as the refrain, in the form:

a+x, a+y; b+x, b+y, c+x, c+y, etc.

According to Ian Pittaway, there is also the compound estampie where puncta following the first punctus begin by adding new material, then repeat one or more sections of material from preceding puncta before the open and closed endings. There is no exact form aside from the fact that new material comes first.

An example of the form of compound estampie is found in Tre Fontane, and English estampie:

abcd+x abcd+y ebcd+x ebcd+y fcd+x fcd+y gd+x gd+y

Due to the variety of ways how estampies have been written, there are some examples of works classified as estampies that don’t exactly follow the aforementioned forms or contain several types of formal structures. The manuscript Douce 139 functions as a compound estampie for the first 3 puncta, but this material is not repeated in any of the later sections, where it begins to be more linear such as the form a+x, a+y, b+x, b+y, etc. This manuscript contains several other errors, such as missing endings, or endings fully written out and not notated; it is unknown whether this a scribe error, or if the manuscript is unfinished.

In comparison to other dance forms, Grocheio considered the instrumental estampie "complicated," with puncta of varying lengths This is in contrast to the more regular verse length of the ductia. There are also more puncta in an estampie than in a ductia. He further states that this difficulty captivates the attention of both the players and listeners because of these complications. According to Grocheio, the vocal estampie begins with a refrain, which is repeated at the end of each stanza, with text and melody independent of the stanza. However, surviving songs do not include a section labeled as a refrain, so some scholars suggest that a convention must have existed for choosing lines to use as a refrain. Like the instrumental form, the vocal dance was complicated enough to require concentration, which helps to distract young people from wicked thoughts.

Scholar Elizabeth Eva Leach wrote about a poetic form of estampie through the discussion of Douce 308. In a chapter titled "The Estampies of Douce 308" from Leach's book Music and Instruments of the Middle Ages, there is a heavy discussion about how the poetic forms of estampies differ from both instrumental and vocal forms. These poetic estampies were devoid of musical notation making the form reliant on syllabic stress and enjambment to make it recognizable.

== History ==
The estampie is the first known genre of medieval era dance music which continues to exist today. The earliest reported example of this musical form is the song "Kalenda maya", written by the troubadour Raimbaut de Vaqueiras (1180–1207), possibly to a preexisting melody. 14th century examples include estampies with subtitles such as "Isabella" and "Tre fontane". The estampie is also the earliest in compositional style that uses both vocal and instrumental music with each written in a different structure and it is the earliest example of dance evolving simultaneously with the complexity of music.

== Instrumentation ==
Sources for individual songs do not generally indicate what instruments were used. However, according to Grocheio, the vielle was the supreme instrument of the period, and the stantipes, together with the cantus coronatus and ductia, were the principal forms played on vielles before the wealthy in their celebration. While evidence of estampies being performed on instruments beyond non-bowed strings is rare, it does exist. There is existing evidence of estampies being performed on keyboard instruments, including the organ dating back to a letter written in 1388 by King John I of Aragon. The letter requests for an organ player named John to bring his book of estampies to be performed for him. Though the estampie is generally monophonic, one account provides an example of a performance of the Kalenda Maya being performed by two instrumentalists, with one playing the melody and the other adding an ornamental upper harmony, suggesting that the estampie form had room for improvisation. There are also two-voice compositions in the form of an estampie, such as the two for keyboard in the Robertsbridge Fragment. The French estampie was performed in a lively triple meter, a primary division of three beats to the bar.

== Dance ==
Although there is some opposition, the popular consensus is that the estampie was a form of dance. Scholars such as Peggy Dixon and Belinda Belinda Quirey have theorized that estampie is the first recorded instance of a “couples dance”. In line with certain etymological interpretations, many draw a connection to the stamping of feet as being characteristic of the dance.

== Etymology ==
There is contention surrounding the exact etymology of the word “estampie”. According to the OED, the name comes from the Provençal estampida, feminine of estampit, the past participle of estampir "to resound". According to Ian Pittaway, the name was given by Grocheio from the Latin, “Stantipes” or “Stantipedes”, meaning “standing/stationary feet”. However, according to Curt Sachs, the word stems from the vulgar Latin, “Stante” or “Stantiae”, translated as “delay” perhaps in relation to the repetitive nature of the musical form.
