= Peironet =

Peironet or Peyronet was a Catalan troubadour and jongleur (juglar in contemporary records). "Peironet" is a diminutive of the Occitan name "Peire", meaning Peter. He might be the same person as Pere Salvatge.

He was travelling with the entourage of the infante Peter, the heir to James I of Aragon, in October 1268 at Sant Celoni. He composed a tenso with the infante discussing the war with the County of Urgell that Peter had waged from September to December that year. Peironet and another jongleur who does not participate in the poetic exchange, Arnaut tritxador, were apparently carrying a message to the infante about the status of his father the king. In the tenso Peironet talks about armes i amors, war and love, the two favourite themes of the troubadours. The song, the incipit of which is Can vey En Peyronet ploran ("When Sir Peironet came crying"), consists of two stanzas by the heir and a two-stanza response from the messenger.
