= Luys d'Averçó =

Catalan politician, naval financier and man of letters

Luys d'Averçó or Luis de Aversó (c.1350–1412x15) was a Catalan politician, naval financier, and man of letters. His magnum opus, the Torcimany, is one of the most important medieval Catalan-language grammars to modern historians. His name is spelled Lluís d'Averçó or d'Aversó in modern orthography.

Averçó was born to a family of naval shipowners in Barcelona in the middle of the fourteenth century. He continued in the family business and profited from it financially all his life. He appears to be well-trained in law, for he participated in the municipal government of Barcelona throughout his life, being a councillor (conseller) in 1395 and again in 1403. During the interregnum of 1410–12 he was charged by the Parliament of Catalonia with arbitrating some disputes amongst the citizens of Lleida. He later represented Barcelona on a diplomatic mission to Majorca. His diverse interests economic, literary, military, and political brought him favour with the monarchs John I ("the Lover of Elegance") and Martin ("the Humane").

No poems by Averçó survive, though his reputation in the poetic world of his time is undeniable. He and Jaume March II persuaded John I to inaugurate the jocs florals at Barcelona and establish a Consistori de la Gaya Sciènça there. On 20 February 1393 John named Jaume and Averçó the first judges of the Consistori's contests (jocs). On 12 August 1399 their position was reaffirmed by king Martin. Averçó's poetic reputation is further established by his Torcimany, which contain a wealth of information for composing poetry in Catalan.

Torcimany survives in a single autograph in the library of the Escorial. Its diffusion was almost null, its influence equally so, and its citation nonexistent. Not even Jaume March's Libre de concordances, which served the same purpose—a dictionary of rhymes (diccionari de rimes)—as the appendix of Averçó's Torcimany, shows any evidence of cross-fertilisation or influence. The two poets, who knew each other personally, wrote two similar but independent works. Torcimany cannot be confidently dated beyond the final third of the century. It is divided into three sections, the first on the basic concepts of grammar, the second (del trobar, "on composition") on the genres (dictats) of poetry, and the third on more difficult aspects of grammar and rhetoric, such as compàs (rhythm).

Torcimany is not too different from the Compendi of Joan de Castellnou or the Flors del gay saber of Guilhem Molinier. The dictionary of rhymes with which it ends, however, is unique to it; and Averçó does not appear to have had access to the Donatz proensals of Uc Faidit. He appears to have compiled his dictionary from memory and probably for this reason he includes words that would be difficult to employ in the type of verse he seeks to enable. Generally his words have Catalan endings, but a good portion are clearly Occitan, the language of the troubadours. A few on top of that are Castilian or Aragonese, which he clarifies with their Catalan equivalents. These Castilianisms are also unnecessary for Catalan poetry, but Averçó was fixed upon extending his rhymary.
