= Guillem Ramon de Gironella =

Guillem Ramon de Gironella was a late thirteenth-century Catalan troubadour. His poetry, while difficult, is highly original and praised for its beauty.

Guillem Ramon was from Gironella in the Berguedà. There are many persons carrying the name "Ramon de Gironella" in twelfth- and thirteenth-century documents, but no others named "Guillem Ramon". The troubadour has been identified with a person bearing the initials "G.R." marked on a tomb in the monastery of Sant Daniel de Girona and lying next to the tomb of his mother, Brunissendis de Gerundella. If this identification is correct, then Guillem Ramon was the canon Guillelmus Raimundi de Gerundella whose death is recorded in monastic records on 8 July of an unknown year.

All of Guillem Ramon's surviving poetry, four works in total, is preserved in a single chansonnier, three cansos under the full name Guilem Raimon de Gironela and one partimen with the jongleur Pouzet under the name Guilem Raimon. Towards the end of this piece, "Del joi d'amor agradiu", Guillem suggests submitting it to the judgement of la de Palau ("[she] of Palau"), but the lady and the Palau to which this refers are not securely identifiable. The contemporary Catalan troubadour Cerverí de Girona, in his Recepta de xarob, wrote (between 1260 and 1285): E si Na Guyllamona (or Guillemona) / lay a Palau, vos dona / un pauc de cuyndia. . . . The lady Guillemona may be the la de Palau of Guillem Ramon's partimen. If so, this would establish a link between the obscure Guillem Ramon and the famous Cerverí, putting the former in better context.

One further reference from Cerverí, however, throws the identification of Guillem Ramon the troubadour with the canon into doubt. Cerverí, in his Testament (1274), says that En Poncet is grateful to the don de Gironella (lord of Gironella), but Guillem Ramon was not the feudal lord of Gironella nor even a nobleman, but a cleric. Whether Cerverí was confused or Guillem Ramon only took up his clerical career late in life is not known.

In two of his cansos—"Gen m'apareill" and "La clara lutz del bel jorn"—Guillem Ramon celebrates a person by the senhal (or nickname) Sobreluenh ("Over-a-distance"), but whether this is his lady or a friend, like the viscount of Cardona or Cabrera is debated. Ramon Guillem was familiar with the poem Erec and Enide of Chrétien de Troyes, as he makes known in "Gen m'apareill":

Cor es de bos aips complida
deu esser enantida
sa valors, s'ap si m'acueill;
enquer n'er meils que d'Enida
can Erecs l'ac enrequida,
quar mais la tem e l'am meils.

He also wrote the canso "Pos l'amors r'ensen".

== Sources ==
- Riquer, Martín de. Los trovadores: historia literaria y textos. 3 vol. Barcelona: Planeta, 1975.
