= Elias Fonsalada =

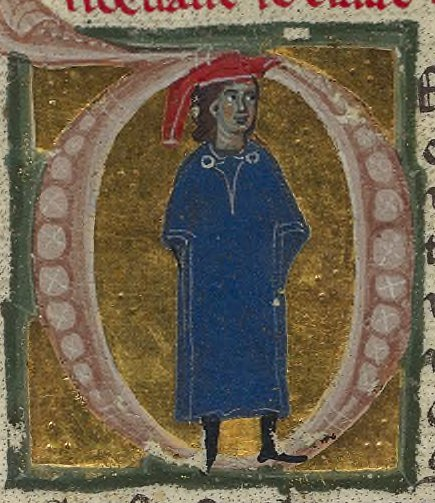
Elias, from a 13th-century chansonnier

Elias (de) Fonsalada (fl. late 12th/first quarter of the 13th century) was a troubadour from Bergerac in the Périgord (the Diocese of Périgueux according to his vida). Only two cansos of his survive.

His vida goes further in describing him as a handsome man of the middle class, the son of a burgher and jongleur, who himself became a jongleur. The biographer did not regard him as an accomplished trobaire (troubadour/composer/inventor of poetry) but as a noellaire. This word has been open to interpretation. Boutière and Schutz in their French compilation of the vidas of the troubadours translate it as "auteur d'un genre particulier" (author of a particular genre) or "beau parleur" (good conversationalist). Later Levy traced its etymology to novelador, "auteur de novelles" (author of novas, novels), and Egan, in her English translation, has taken this up as "storyteller". A nova was probably a narrative, as opposed to lyric, work. Thus Elias' vida provides a rare glimpse of narrative vernacular writing in Occitan at the height of the troubadour art.

The poem En Abriu is assigned to Elias in manuscript C (a 14th-century work now known as f.f. 856 in the Bibliothèque nationale de France, Paris). This attribution, however, is contradicted by other sources and the poem is usually given to Marcabru.

== Sources ==
- Egan, Margarita (ed. and trans.) The Vidas of the Troubadours. New York: Garland, 1984. ISBN 0-8240-9437-9.
- Gaunt, Simon; Harvey, Ruth; and Paterson, Linda M., edd. Marcabru: A Critical Edition. Boydell & Brewer, 2000.
- Jewers, Caroline. "The Name of the Ruse and the Round Table: Occitan Romance and the Case for Cultural Resistance." Neophilologus. Vol. 81, No. 2 (Apr., 1997), pp. 187–200.
- Jones, W. Powell. "The Jongleur Troubadours of Provence." Publication of the Modern Languages Association, Vol. 46, No. 2. (Jun., 1931), pp. 307–311.
