= Bárta =

Bárta (feminine: Bártová) is a Czech surname. Barta is a Hungarian surname, but it is also an Anglicized and Germanized form of Bárta. Bárta and Barta are pet forms of the given names Bartoloměj (Czech name) and Bertalan (Hungarian name), both being variants of Bartholomew. Notable people with the surname include:

== Sports ==
- Alexander Barta (born 1983), German ice hockey player
- Bjorn Barta (born 1980), German ice hockey player
- Daniela Bártová (born 1974), Czech athlete
- Franz Barta (1902–?), Austrian boxer
- Gary Barta (born 1963), American athletic director
- Heidemarie Bártová (born 1965), Czech diver
- István Barta (1895–1948), Hungarian water polo player
- Jan Bárta (born 1984), Czech road cyclist
- Krisztina Barta (born 1991), Hungarian ice dancer
- Libor Barta (born 1967), Czech ice hockey player
- Michal Bárta (born 1989), Czech footballer
- Michal Bárta (ice hockey) (born 1987), Czech ice hockey player
- Nóra Barta (born 1984), Hungarian diver
- Radka Bártová (born 1990), Slovak figure skater
- Vladimír Bárta (born 1955), Czech judoka
- Zdeněk Bárta (1891–1987), Czech fencer

== Other ==
- Adam Barta (born 1979), American actor
- Aleš Bárta (born 1960), Czech organist
- Dan Bárta, (born 1969), Czech singer
- Hilary Barta (born 1957), American comic book writer and artist
- Jiří Barta (born 1948), Czech stop-motion animation director
- Jiří Bárta (1935–2012), Czech pianist and composer
- Josef Bárta (1744–1787), Czech composer
- Lubor Bárta (1928–1972), Czech composer
- Martina Bárta (born 1988), Czech singer
- Sándor Barta (1897–1938), Hungarian poet
- Šimon Bárta (1864–1940), Czech Roman Catholic clergyman
- Steve Barta (born 1953), Brazilian pianist
- Vít Bárta (born 1973), Czech politician
- Tred Barta (1952–2019), American hunter, fisherman and outdoorsman

== See also ==
- Bernart de la Barta (fl. 1229), French troubadour
