= Pere Salvatge =

Catalan troubadour

Pere Salvatge or Peire/Peyre Salvagge was a Catalan troubadour of the late thirteenth century (fl. 1280–1287). He is most notable as a constant attendant at the court of Peter III and Alfonso III of Aragon. He may be the same person as the Peironet who composed poems with Peter III.

Salvatge wrote the third piece in a five-piece cycle of sirventes written in Summer 1285. Early in the summer Bernart d'Auriac inaugurated the political debate by coming to the defence of the "three kings" Philip III of France, Philip of Navarre, and Charles of Valois, who claimed the Crown of Aragon. Under the direction of the French king they invaded Catalonia in the so-called "Aragonese Crusade". After Peter III of Aragon responded to Bernart, Pere responded to Peter in the short piece Senher, reys qu'enamoratz par.

Pere appears to have gotten his nickname from his occupation as a caballero salvaje or cavaller salvatge in the king's house. As such, he acted as messenger and herald. Among his duties was directing the battle cry when the king's armies went to war. Pere is first mentioned by name in 1280 as a juglar del rey ("jongleur of the king"). In April 1286 he was charged with distributing compensation in precious metal and money to the other jongleurs who had assisted in Peter's coronation (in 1276). He was still alive in June 1287 when Alfonso III ordered proceedings against some men accused of kidnapping Pere's daughter.

== Sources ==
- Riquer, Martín de. Los trovadores: historia literaria y textos. 3 vol. Barcelona: Planeta, 1975.
