= Tenco =

Tenco may refer to:

- Tenço, alternative way of writing Tenso, a style of troubadour song
- Luigi Tenco (1938–1967), Italian singer songwriter
