= Bernart de la Barta =

Troubadour

Bernart de la Barta (fl. 1229), also spelled Bernarnz Delabarta or Benart de la Barda, was a troubadour from La Barthe, the location of which is unknown. He wrote two tensos, a fragment (cobla) of a satire, and a sirventes, "Foilla ni flors, ni chatuz temps ni fredura", an attack on terms of the Treaty of Meaux (1229), by which Raymond VII of Toulouse surrendered to Louis IX of France, thus ending the Albigensian Crusade.

The interpretation of Bernart's sirventes as an attack on the treaty of 1229 was first proposed in 1885 by Camille Chabaneau and subsequently accepted by Alfred Jeanroy. Bernart definitely attacks Louis IX and the Roman Church, coming equally to the defence of Raymond VII, whom he believes was treated unjustly. The crusade waged in the name of peace was for "a peace of clerics and Frenchmen". According to Bernard, a peace imposed forcibly on the defeated is unjust and Raymond, as a good vassal, deserves just treatment.

Bernart also knew the troubadour Guilhem Peire Cazals de Caortz, with whom he composed one of his tensos.

== Sources ==
- Anatole, Christian. "Le troubadour Bernat de la Barta." Annales du Midi, 101-187 (1989), pp. 225–233
- Chambers, Frank M. "Three Troubadour Poems with Historical Overtones." Speculum, 54:1 (Jan., 1979), pp. 42–54.
- Jeanroy, Alfred. La poésie lyrique des troubadours. Toulouse: Privat, 1934.
- Ricketts, Peter. "Foilla ni flors, ni chautz temps ni freidura de Bernart de la Barta: édition critique et traduction." La France latine, 142 (2006), pp. 141–5.
