= Cançoner Gil =

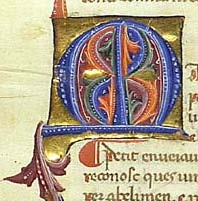
Initial "M" from a poem of Guiraut de Bornelh

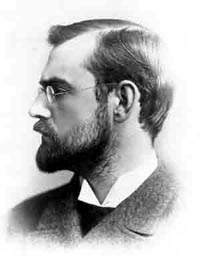
Archer Huntington, leader in placing the chansonnier in the library for preservation and public availability

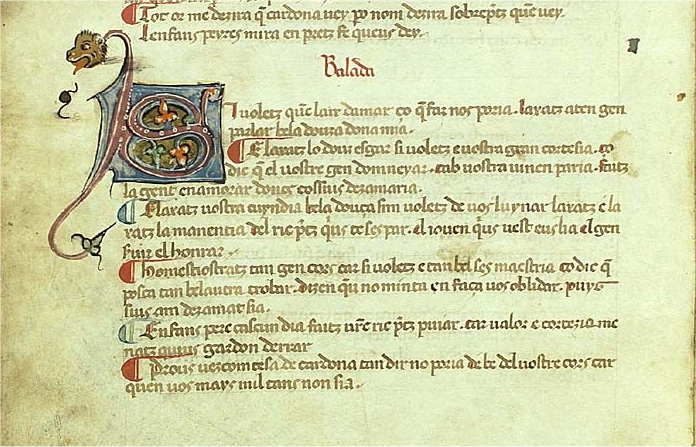
Cerverí de Girona, "Si voletz que.m laix d'amar", a balada, folio 34v

The Cançoner Gil (Catalan: [kənsuˈne ˈʒil], Occitan: [kansuˈne ˈdʒil]) is an Occitan chansonnier produced in Catalonia in the middle of the 14th century. In the systematic nomenclature of Occitanists, it is typically named MS Sg, but as Z in the reassignment of letter names by François Zufferey. It is numbered MS 146 in the Biblioteca de Catalunya in Barcelona, where it now resides.

The name of the chansonnier is not medieval. It is so-called after its last possessor before it was donated to the Biblioteca, Pablo Gil y Gil, Dean of the Faculty of Philosophy and Letters of the University of Zaragoza (c. 1910), owner of a valuable collection of ancient manuscripts. It was donated at the request of a group of ten of the library's patrons: Isidre Bonsoms, Pere Grau Maristany, Eduard Sevilla, the Marquès de Maury, Josep Mansana, Jacinte Serra, Manuel Girona, Hug Herberg, Teresa Ametller, and Archer Milton Huntington. Part of the motive for donating the chansonnier was to have it rebound. It was given new red leather binding decorated with the arms of the provincial government (diputació) and the Cross of Saint James. Ramon Miquel i Planes, with the advice of Ernest Molinés i Brasés of the Escola de les Arts del Llibre, and the technical skill of J. Figuerola, restored the chansonnier with the new binding at the behest of the provincial government.

The chansonnier is well preserved, made of high-quality parchment with clear, well-formed letters. The first third of it is decorated with initials and marginalia, but the latter folios are unfinished; the spaces left for ornamentation are unfilled. Also, no space is left for musical notation, and since some of the poems are known to have melodies, the chansonnier must have been produced to be read, not used (for musical performance).

The chansonnier contains 285 poems. In the first section it contains almost all the lyric compositions of Cerverí de Girona, a late thirteenth-century Catalan troubadour and one of the most prolific. The second section contains the work of several twelfth-century troubadours from the classical era of their lyric art, namely Raimbaut de Vaqueiras, Bertran de Born, Guiraut de Bornelh, Arnaut Daniel, Guilhem de Saint Leidier, Bernart de Ventadorn, Pons de Capduelh, Jaufre Rudel, and Guilhem de Berguedan. The final segment of the manuscript, completely without decoration, is devoted to the troubadours (many probably contemporary) of the "school of Toulouse", associated with the later Consistori del Gay Saber. These include Joan de Castellnou, Raimon de Cornet, and Gaston III of Foix-Béarn. Included towards the end of the manuscript is one Old French work: an excerpt of the Roman de Troie by Benoît de Sainte-Maure.

The Gil is the only source for a number of Cerverí de Girona's poems. It offers a large number of variants of the well-known classical poems, perhaps because it is based on oral traditions and not on other texts. It is for this that it was lettered Sg and Z, towards the end of the alphabet and among the (traditionally) less reliable chansonniers, though this system of classification is no longer considered a good guide to accuracy or reliability.

== Sources ==
- Riquer, Martín de. Historia de la literatura catalana, Vol. 1. Barcelona: Ariel, 1964.
- Miriam Cabré et Sadurní Martí, "Le Chansonnier Sg au carrefour Occitano-Catalan", Romania, vol. 128 (2010), pp. 92–134.
