= Devinalh =

Genre of Old Occitan lyric poetry

The devinalh (Old Occitan: [deviˈnaʎ], roughly meaning "guesswork"), was a genre of Old Occitan lyric poetry practiced by some troubadours. It takes the form of a riddle, or series of riddles or cryptograms and is, if read literally, mostly nonsensical. Known practitioners include Guilhen de Peiteu, Raimbaut of Orange, Giraut de Bornelh, Guilhem Ademar, Guilhem de Berguedan and Raimbaut de Vaqueiras.

The term was created by modern scholars of Old Occitan and was never used by the troubadours themselves to refer to a specific type of poem.

== Examples ==
This was a rare genre, of which only a handful of examples exist; among them:

- Farai un vers de dreit nien by Guilhen de Peiteu, the first known example
- Las frevols venson lo plus fort by Raimbaut de Vaqueiras
- Taflamart faflama hoflomom maflamal puflums siflima eflementre boflomonaflamas geflemens, a cryptogram by Cerveri de Girona
