= Robertsbridge Codex =

14th century music manuscript

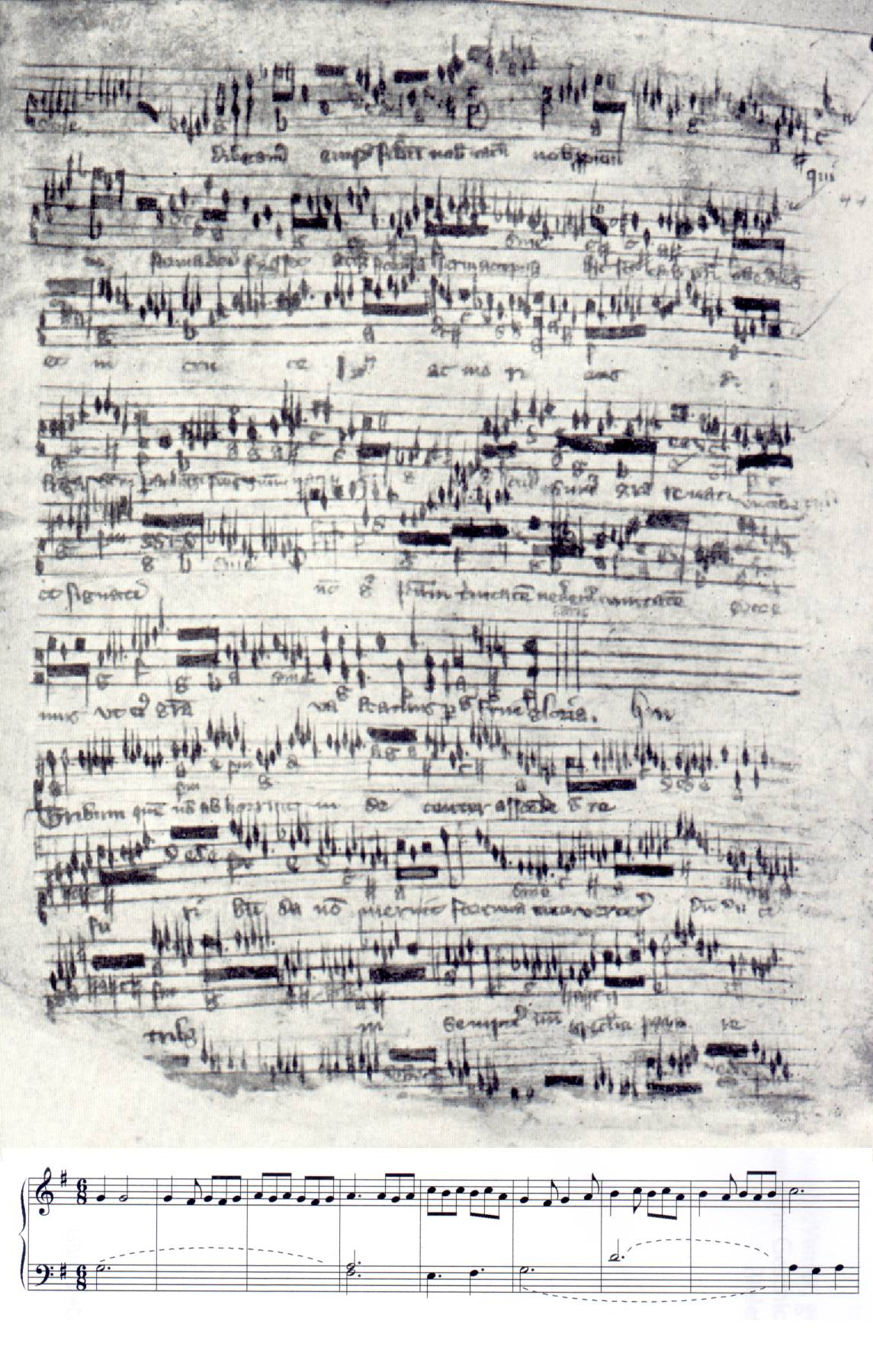
Folio No. 44 recto from the Robertsbridge Codex

The Robertsbridge Codex (1360) is a music manuscript of the 14th century. It contains the earliest surviving music written specifically for keyboard.

The term codex is somewhat misleading: the musical section of the source comprises only two leaves, bound together with a larger manuscript from Robertsbridge, East Sussex, England. It contains six pieces, three of them in the form of the estampie, an Italian dance form of the Trecento, as well as three arrangements of motets. Two of the motets are from the Roman de Fauvel. All of the music is anonymous, and all is written in tablature. Most of the music for the estampies is for two voices, often in parallel fifths, and also using hocket technique. Most likely the instrument used to play the pieces in the Codex was the organ. Formerly the date of the Codex was presumed to be around 1330, but more recent research has suggested a later date, slightly after mid-century.

The manuscript was considered Italian and connected to the main streams of the Italian trecento in its contents and in its clear use of puncti divisionis (dots of division). However, scholarly consensus now considers the source English.

The Codex is in the British Library (Add MS 28550) in London.

Estampie "Retrove"
From the Robertsbridge Codex, performed by Ulrich Metzner
