= Bernart Marti =

Bernart Marti was a troubadour, composing poems and satires in Occitan, in the mid-twelfth century. His works show that he was influenced by his contemporary Marcabru and that he knew Peire d'Alvernha, who, in one poem, he accused of abandoning holy orders. Along with Peire, Gavaudan, and Bernart de Venzac, he is sometimes placed in a hypothetical Marcabrunian school. His work is "enigmatic, ironic, and satiric," but has no following among later troubadours, according to Gaunt and Kay.

== Works ==
Nine or ten of Marti's poems survive; the following have been attributed to him:

- A, senhors, qui so cuges
- Amar dei
- Belha m'es la flors d'aguilen
- Bel m'es lai latz la fontana
- Companho, per companhia
- D'entier vers far ieu non pes
- Farai un vers ab son novelh
- Lancan lo douz temps s'esclaire
- Quan l'erb'es reverdezida
- Qant la pluei'eˑl vens eˑl tempiers
