= Monge de Montaudon =

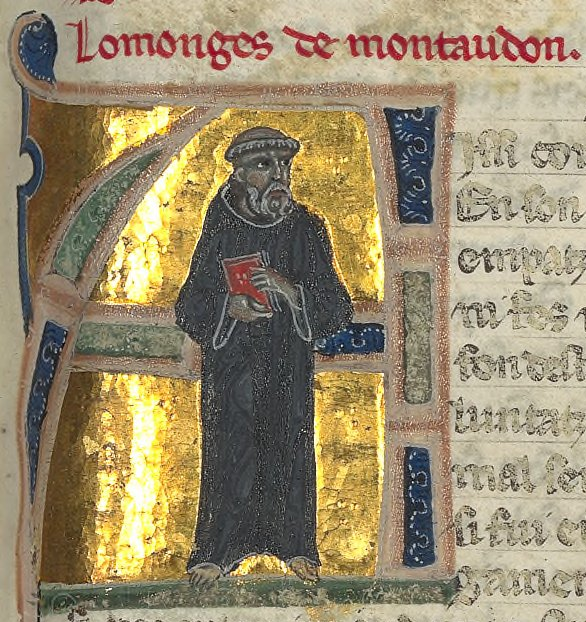
"Lo monges de Montaudon" from a 13th-century chansonnier now in the Bibliothèque Nationale de France.

The (Lo) Monge de Montaudon (meaning "monk of Montaudon") (fl. 1193–1210), born Pèire de Vic, was a nobleman, monk, and troubadour from the Auvergne, born at the castle of Vic-sur-Cère near Aurillac, where he became a Benedictine monk around 1180. According to his vida, he composed "couplets while he was in the monastery and sirventes on subjects that were popular in the region."

== Life ==
The Monge requested and received the priory of Montaudon from the abbot of Aurillac. Montaudon may be identified with Montauban or perhaps with a Mons Odonis southeast of Clermont. He became so popular with local nobility that he was taken from his monastery to serve them, receiving honours and gifts in return. In this way he greatly improved the state of his priorate and, upon his request, was released from his monastic vocation by his abbot to follow Alfonso II of Aragon, whose vassal the viscount of Carlat and lord of Vic was. This is the view of his vida; he may have simply abandoned holy orders. Internal evidence in his poems suggests wide wanderings, to Périgord, Languedoc, and Catalonia, and the patronage of Dalfi d'Alvernha and Maria de Ventadorn.

At Alfonso's court, according to his vida, he ate meat, courted women, and composed songs and poems. In return he was appointed lord of the poetical society of Puy Sainta Maria (Puy-Sainte-Marie) at Le-Puy-en-Velay (Podium Aniciense) and received a sparrow hawk, the prize the society granted for superb poetry. According to his vida, he held the "suzerainty" of the "court of Puy" (cour du Puy) until it was dissolved.

After this he went to Roussillon, where he became prior of the Benedictine priory of Saint-Pierre-de-Belloc, near Villafranca, though this establishment was not, contrary to his vida, a dependent of Aurillac. He is said to have "enriched [the priory] and improved it" before "ending his days" there.

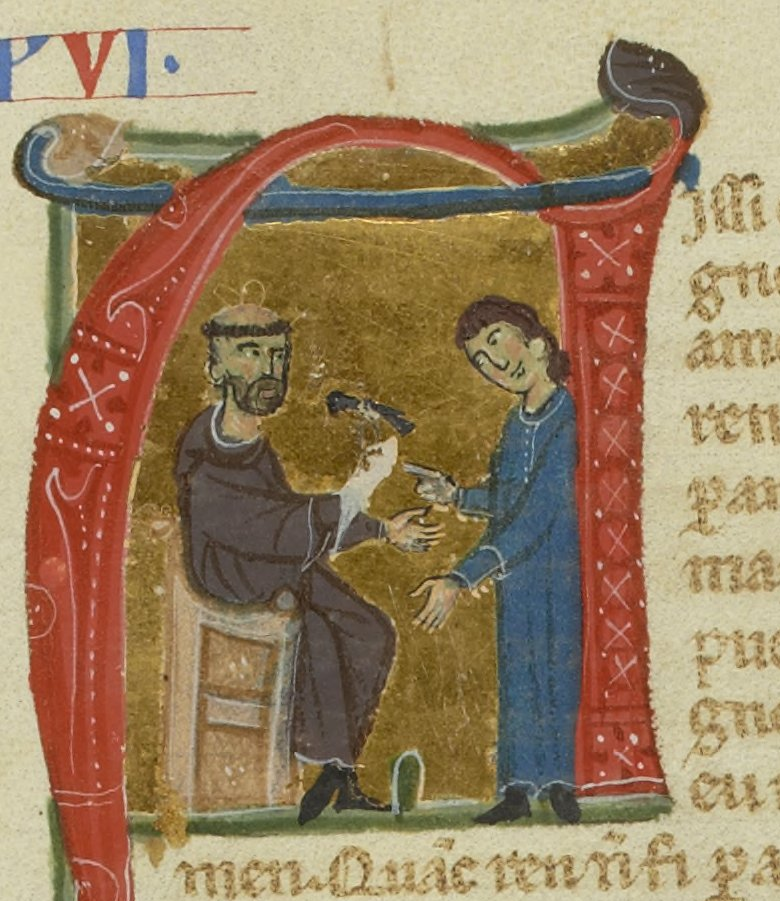
The monk receiving a sparrow hawk as a prize for his poetry. The bird is white and perched on his arm.

== Songs ==
The Monge's earliest song which can be reliably dated refers to the captivity of Richard I of England in Austria (1192–1194). Though seven of his cansos survive, he is most well known for the genres he probably invented: the enueg and plazer. He wrote four enuegz: Be m'enuejan, per saint Marsal and Be m'enueja, per saint Salvaire being two. His cansos are "rich in feudal metaphors".

Among the Monge's other works, Mout me platz deportz e gaieza and Be m'enueia, s'o auzes dire have been translated into English as "What I Like" and "What I Don't Like" respectively. He wrote fictional tensos with God. Around 1192–4 he wrote Pos Peire d'Alvernh' a chantat, a famous parody of a satire of Peire d'Alvernha. In it he insults his contemporaries, such as Arnaut Daniel, Arnaut de Maruelh, Folquet de Marselha, Gaucelm Faidit, Guilhem Ademar, Guillem de Saint Didier, Peire Vidal, Peirol, Raimon Jordan, and Raimon de Miraval. Two of his melodies survive. One of these, the music for the enueg Fort m'enoja, so auzes dire was borrowed from a sirventes, Rassa, tan creis e mont, of Bertran de Born: the only piece of Bertran's music to survive. Only one melody by the Monge himself—for a canso entitled Ara pot ma dona saber—survives. Nonetheless, this lone piece of work is characterised by phrase variation and motivic transformation, with an unexpected ending.

The poem S'eu vos voill tan gen lauzar was appended to a set of four by the Monge in the 13th century, but it is probably a work of Jausbert de Puycibot.

== Sources ==
- Aubrey, Elizabeth. The Music of the Troubadours. Indiana University Press, 1996. ISBN 0-253-21389-4.
- Chambers, Frank M. "On the Attribution of a Provençal Poem." Modern Language Notes, Vol. 62, No. 5. (May, 1947), pp. 320–322.
- Egan, Margarita (trans.) The Vidas of the Troubadours. New York: Garland, 1984. ISBN 0-8240-9437-9.
- Gaunt, Simon, and Kay, Sarah (edd.) The Troubadours: An Introduction. Cambridge: Cambridge University Press, 1999. ISBN 0-521-57473-0.
- Kehew, Robert (ed.) Lark in the Morning: The Verses of the Troubadours. Ezra Pound and William De Witt Snodgrass, trans. Chicago: University of Chicago Press, 2005. ISBN 0-226-42932-6.
- Routledge, Michael J. Les Poésies du Moine de Montaudon. Montpellier: 1977.
