= Enuig =

Genre of Occitan poetry

The enuig, enueg or enuech (Old Occitan: [eˈnɥitʃ]; "complaint, vexation") is a genre of lyric poetry practised by the troubadours. Somewhat similar to the sirventes, the enuig was generally a litany of complaints, few of them connect topically to the others. The word "enuig" appears frequently in such works. The Monge de Montaudon was the first master of the enuig.

Raymond Hill defined an enueg as "the enumeration in epigrammatic style of a series of vexatious things". He finds the genre continued in later medieval Catalan, Italian, French, and Galician-Portuguese literature. Ernest Wilkins considered William Shakespeare's Sonnet LXVI an example of an English enuig, citing also example from Petrarch. Richard Levin considers the anonymous English poem beginning "Whear giltles men ar greuously opreste" to be an enuig.

== Sources ==
- Chambers, Frank M. An Introduction to Old Provençal Versification. Diane, 1985. ISBN 0-87169-167-1.
- Hill, Raymond Thompson. "The Enueg", Periodical of the Modern Languages Association, 27 (1912), pp. 265–96.
- Hill, Raymond Thompson. "The Enueg and Plazer in Medieval French and Italian", Periodical of the Modern Languages Association, 30 (1915), pp. 42–63.
- Levin, Richard. "A Second English Enueg", Philological Quarterly, 53:3 (1974:Summer), pp. 428–30.
- Wilkins, Ernest. "The Enueg in Petrarch and Shakespeare", MP, 13 (1915), pp. 495–96.
