= Bartas =

Bartas is a surname. Notable people with the surname include:

- Guillaume de Salluste Du Bartas (1544–1590), French courtier and poet
- Šarūnas Bartas (born 1964), Lithuanian film director
- Nojus Bartaska (born 1996), Lithuanian pop rock singer-songwriter

== See also ==
- Barta (surname)
