= Guilhem Molinier =

French poet

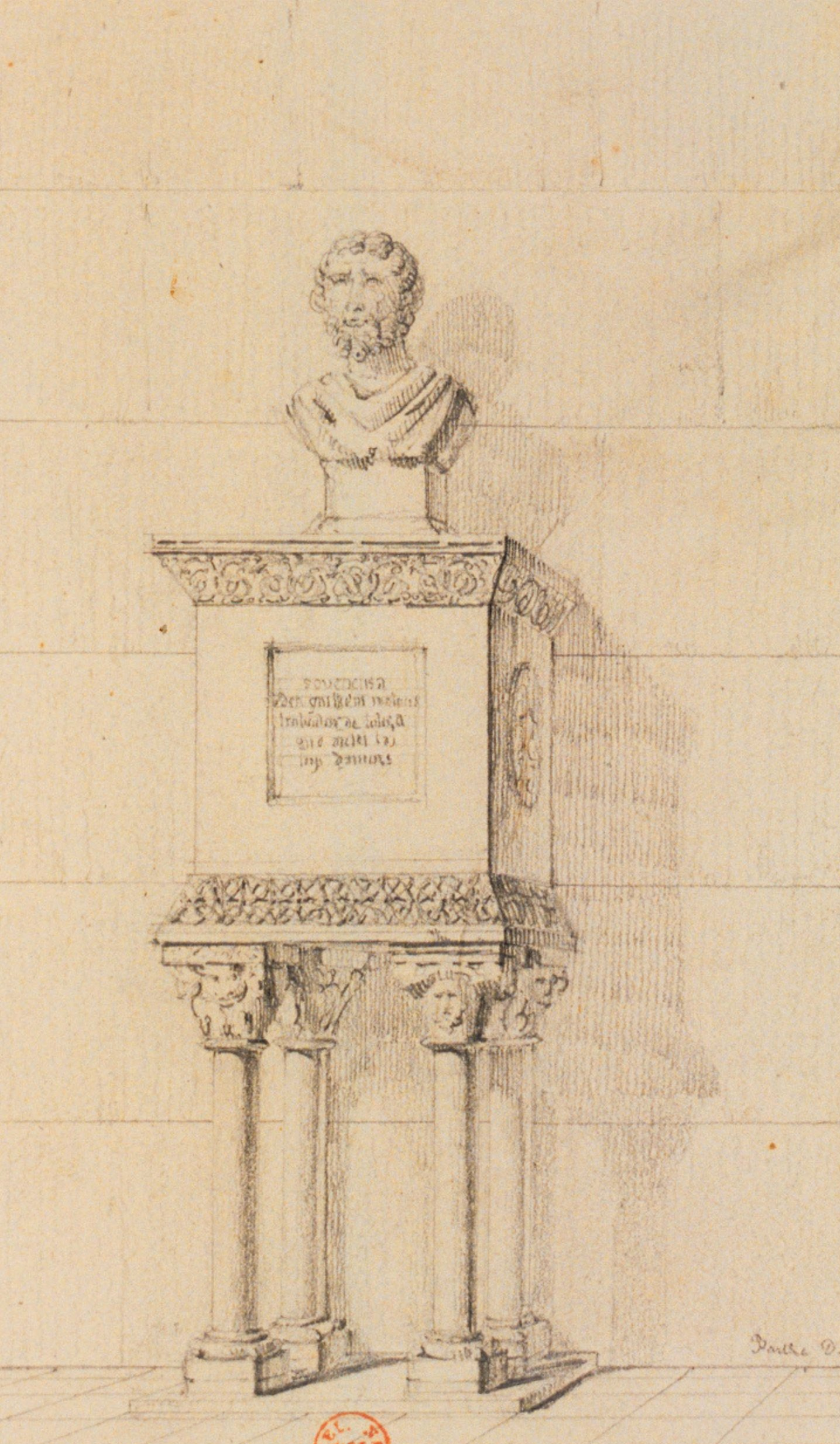
Design for a tomb of Molinier, with bust (19th century, Musée du Vieux Toulouse)

Guilhem Molinier or Moulinier (fl. 1330–50) was a medieval Occitan poet from Toulouse. His most notable work is Leys d'amors ("Laws of Love"), a treatise on rhetoric and grammar that achieved great notoriety and, beyond the Occitan, influenced poets writing in Catalan as well as in Galician or Italian, for which they served as a reference. The occasion for its composition was the founding in 1323 of the Consistori de la Sobregaya Companhia del Gay Saber ("Consistory of the Happy Company of the Gay Science") at Toulouse. The consistory consisted of seven members who organized poetic contests and rewarded lyric poems that best imitated the style of the 12th- and 13th-century troubadours. Molinier was not an original member of the consistory, but he was its chancellor in 1348, when he was tasked with codifying the principles of Occitan lyric poetry. In this work he had a collaborator, Marc Bartholomieu. A final version was approved by the consistory in 1356.

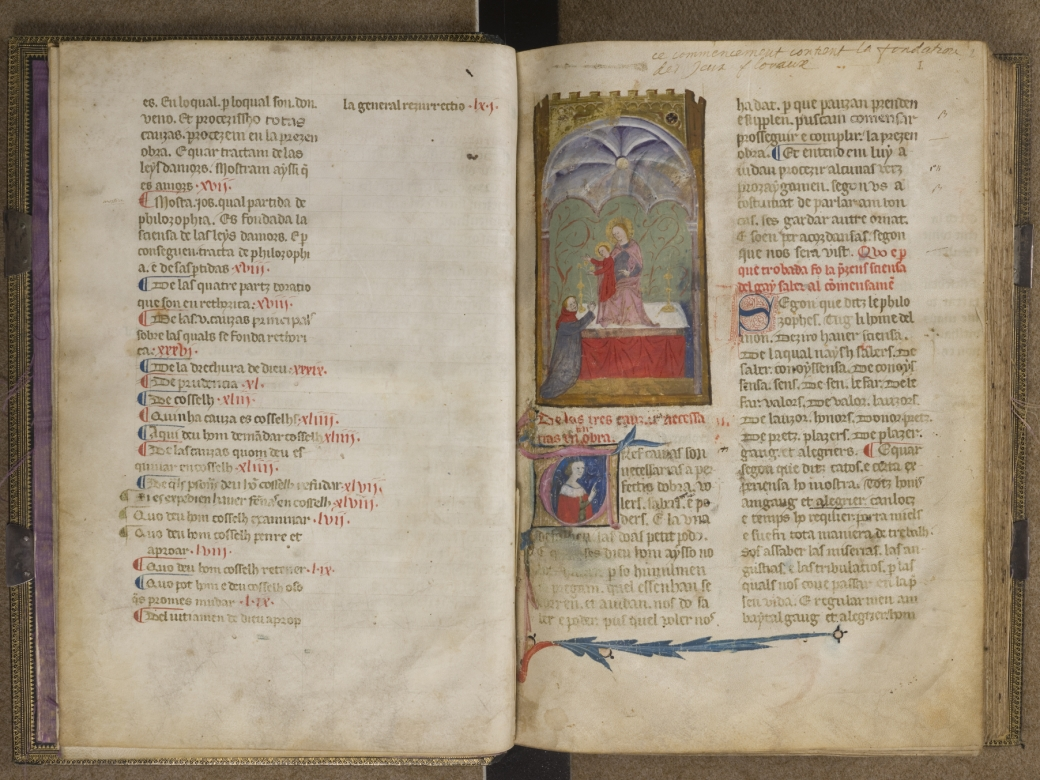
Two pages from the manuscript of the Leys d'Amors.

The original Leys d'amors dates to 1328. The archives of the present-day Académie des Jeux floraux (a descendant of the Consistory del Gay Saber) contains a folio copy of this edition under the title by which the work has become known. It contains many subsequently deleted passages and numerous editorial markings. (Note: MS Toulouse, Ac. des Jeux floraux 500.007.) A folio copy of the final and definitive text is also in the archive of the Académie, under the title Las Flors del gay saber ("The Flowers of the Gay Science"). It contains all the deletions, modifications and additions indicated in the unedited 1328 text. This manuscript received a critical edition in 1841–43. (Note: MS Toulouse, Ac. des Jeux floraux 500.006.) A copy of the latter text is also found in the Archives of the Crown of Aragon (Note: MS Arxiu de la Corona d'Aragó, San Cugat del Vallés 13.) and a verse edition is found in the National Library of Catalonia. (Note: MS Biblioteca Central 239.) Further copies based on the Catalan manuscripts are found in Paris, Madrid and Toulouse.

The Leys d'amors is divided into five parts. Part I contains some philosophy of language, theory of poetry, epistemology and rules of orthography. Part II deals with rules for versification and the issue of literary genre. Part III is about grammar and contains both classical material borrowed from Donatus, Priscian, Isidore and Alexander de Villa Dei, as well as modern material on the system of declensions in Occitan, the use of articles, the nature of the sentence and semantics. In terms of linguistic varieties, this section recommends the us acostumat ("customary usage") over local customs. Part IV discusses errors (barbarisms and solecisms) and bad verse. Part V covers practical considerations.

The Leys d'amors owes a debt to Brunetto Latini's Li livres dou Tresor and Albertano di Brescia's Ars loquendi et tacendi. It was in turn especially influential in Catalonia. Its influence can be seen in Luys d'Averçó's Torcimany and Joan de Castellnou's Compendi de la coneixança dels vices en els dictats del Gai Saber. Its influence can even be seen in the Castilian lyrical grammar of Enrique de Villena.
