= Trobar leu =

Style of poetry used by troubadours

The trobar leu (Occitan pronunciation: [tɾuˈβa ˈlɛw]), or light style of poetry, was the most popular style used by the troubadours. Its accessibility gave it a wide audience.

== See also ==
- Trobar ric
- Trobar clus
