= Josef Bárta =

Czech composer

Josef Bárta (also Josef Bartha; c. 1746 – 13 June 1787) was a Czech composer and organist.

== Life ==
Bárta was born in c. 1746 in Prague, Bohemia. He was a priest and organist at the Church of Saint Salvator in Prague. Before 1772, he moved to Vienna. He died in Vienna on 13 June 1787.

In addition to three operas and a singspiel, Bárta wrote piano sonatas, string quartets, and 13 symphonies. His other works are presumed lost.

== Works ==
- La Diavolessa by Carlo Goldoni, 1772
- Da ist nicht gut zu raten (There's no good guessing), comic opera, 1778
- Der adlige Taglöhner (The noble laborer), singspiel, 1780
- Il Mercato di Malmantile, 1784
- 13 symphonies, Prague, Narodni Muzeum (Milada Rutová)
