= Libor Barta =

Czech professional ice hockey player

- Born: 30 July 1967 (age 58)
- NHL draft: Undrafted
- Playing career: 1985–2009

Libor Barta (born 30 July 1967) is a former Czech professional ice hockey player.

Formerly played with HC Slovan Bratislava, HC Pardubice, VTJ Litoměřice, HC Stadion Hradec Králové, HC Kometa Brno BVV, HC Berounští Medvědí, HC Keramika Plzeň, HC Energie Karlovy Vary, HC Chrudim, TJ Sršni Kutná Hora and HC Dvůr Králové nad Labem.
