= Trobar clus =

Trobar clus (Occitan pronunciation: [tɾuˈβa ˈklys]), or closed form, was a complex and obscure style of poetry used by troubadours for their more discerning audiences, and it was only truly appreciated by an elite few. It was developed extensively by Marcabru and Arnaut Daniel, but by 1200 its inaccessibility had led to its disappearance. Among the imitators of Marcabru were Alegret and Marcoat, who claimed himself to write vers contradizentz (contradictory verses), indicative of the incomprehensibility of the trobar clus style. Below is a sample of the style from Marcoat's sirventes Mentre m'obri eis huisel, wherein the poet himself remarks on his moz clus (closed words):

Mon serventes no val plus,
que faitz es de bos moz clus
apren lo, Domeing Sarena.

Among the late twelfth-century practitioners of trobar clus was Peire d'Alvernhe, an imitator of Marcabru, while Raimbaut d'Aurenga of the trobar ric style was influenced by Marcoat. The only trobairitz (female troubadour) to use the trobar clus with mastery was Lombarda around 1216.

== Sources ==
- Bloch, R. Howard (1986) [1983]. Etymologies and Genealogies: A Literary Anthropology of the French Middle Ages. University of Chicago Press. ISBN 978-0-226-05982-2.
- Chambers, Frank M. (1985). An Introduction to Old Provençal Versification. American Philosophical Society. ISBN 978-0-87169-167-5. ISSN 0065-9738.
- Cunnan wiki source (GFDL)

== See also ==
- Trobar leu
- Trobar ric
