= Joan de Castellnou =

Joan's text is the prose text at the top. Raimon's text is the verse on the bottom.

Joan de Castellnou (Occitan pronunciation: [dʒuˈan de kasˌtelˈnɔw]; fl. 1341–1355) was a troubadour of the Consistori del Gay Saber active in Toulouse. He left behind five or six cansos, three vers, a dansa, a conselh, and a sirventes. His most famous works are non-lyric, however: a grammar (compendi) called Las flors del gay saber, estier dichas las Leys d'amors and a glossary (glosari) on the Doctrinal (1324) of his predecessor, Raimon de Cornet.

Joan's Glosari, usually dated to 1341, is a critical analysis of the Doctrinal, not a complete grammar in and of itself. It is dedicated to Peter, Count of Ribagorza. His Leys, however, is the latest and largest medieval Occitan grammatical treatise written with intention of preserving the literary form of the language. It is highly systematic and highly prescriptive. Its double title indicates the close relationship in the medieval lyrical tradition between the science of poetry (gay saber) and the art of love (amors). The dating of the Leys is less certain, Boase puts it between 1328 and 1337, while Jeanroy places it later, in 1355. It was probably commissioned by the Consistori to be a compendium of grammatical knowledge for a wide audience and to "unveil" the secret art of poetry. Its author—who goes unnamed, but is usually identified with Joan today—also seeks to restrain lovers from dishonest love. A parallel has been noticed between the Leys and the prologue of the Libro de Buen Amor of Juan Ruiz.

== Sources ==
- Boase, Roger (1977). The Origin and Meaning of Courtly Love: A Critical Study of European Scholarship. Manchester: Manchester University Press. ISBN 0-87471-950-X.
- Cura Curà, Giulio (2005). "Il "Doctrinal de trobar" di Raimon de Cornet e il "Glosari" di Johan de Castellnou". Parola del testo. 9 (1): 125–149.
- Grinina, Yelena. "Algunas tendencias de la descripción de la gramática en los primeros tratados provenzales y catalanes." Instituto Estatal de Relaciones Internacionales de Moscú.
- Jeanroy, Alfred (1934). La poésie lyrique des troubadours. Toulouse: Privat.
- Martí, Sadurní. "Joan de Castellnou revisité: notes biographiques". Revue des langues romanes, 121.2, 2017, 623-659.
