= Trobar ric =

Troubadour style

The trobar ric (Occitan pronunciation: [tɾuˈβa ˈrik]), or rich form of poetry, was a troubadour style.

It was distinguished by its verbal gymnastics; its best exponent was Arnaut Daniel. Despite the fact that it outlasted trobar clus, it always played a secondary role to trobar leu.

== See also ==
- Trobar leu
- Trobar clus
