= Troubadour =

Composer and performer of lyric poetry during the High Middle Ages

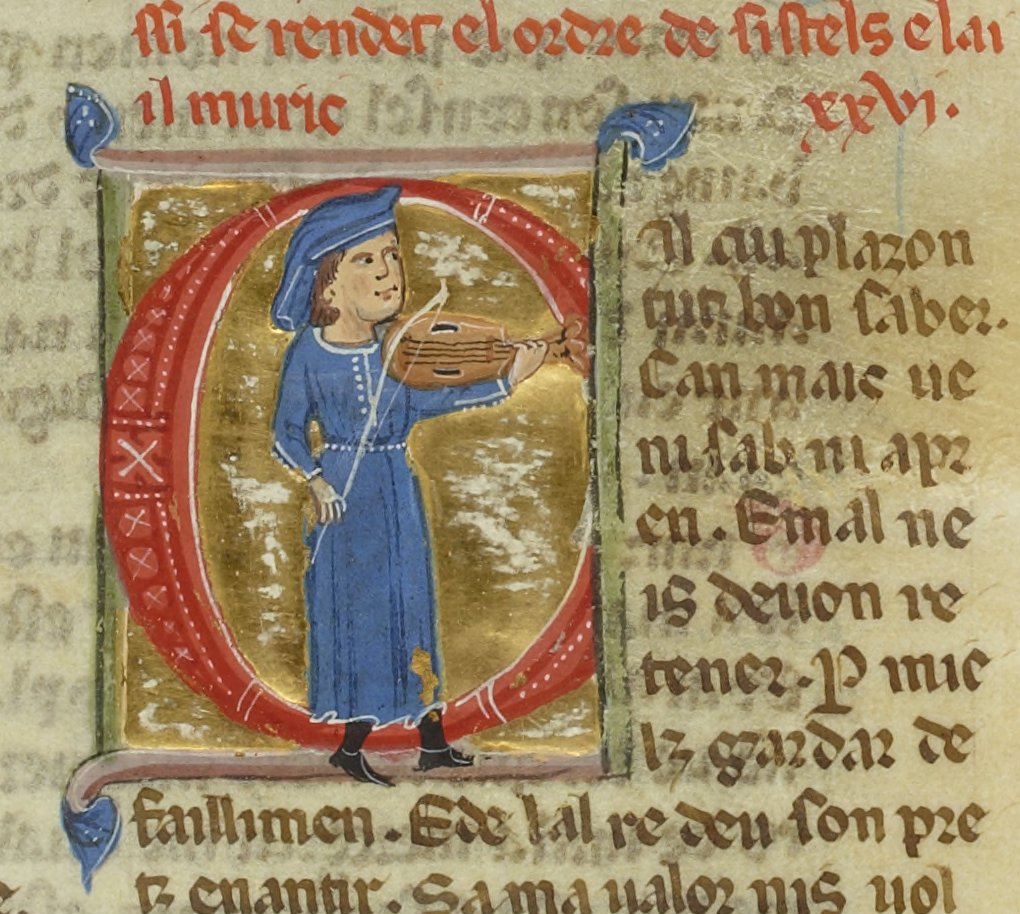
The troubadour Perdigon playing his fiddle

A troubadour (/ˈtruːbədɔːr, -dʊər/; French: [tʁubaduʁ]; Occitan: trobador [tɾuβaˈðu]) was a composer and performer of Old Occitan lyric poetry during the High Middle Ages (1100–1350). Since the word troubadour is etymologically masculine, a female equivalent is usually called a trobairitz.

The troubadour school or tradition began in the late 11th century in Occitania, but it subsequently spread to the Italian and Iberian Peninsulas. Under the influence of the troubadours, related movements sprang up throughout Europe: the Minnesang in Germany, trovadorismo in Galicia and Portugal, and that of the trouvères in northern France. Dante Alighieri in his De vulgari eloquentia defined the troubadour lyric as fictio rethorica musicaque poita: rhetorical, musical, and poetical fiction. After the "classical" period around the turn of the 13th century and a mid-century resurgence, the art of the troubadours declined in the 14th century and died out around the time of the Black Death (1348).

The texts of troubadour songs deal mainly with themes of chivalry and courtly love. Most were metaphysical, intellectual, and formulaic. Many were humorous or vulgar satires. Works can be grouped into three styles: the trobar leu (light), trobar ric (rich), and trobar clus (closed). Likewise there were many genres, the most popular being the canso, but sirventes and tensos were especially popular in the post-classical period.

== Etymology ==
The English word troubadour was borrowed from the French word first recorded in 1575 in a historical context to mean "langue d'oc poet at the court in the 12th and 13th century" (Jean de Nostredame, Les vies des plus célèbres et anciens Poètes provençaux, p. 14 in Gdf. Compl.). The first use and earliest form of troubador is trobadors, found in a 12th-century Occitan text by Cercamon.

The French word itself is borrowed from the Occitan trobador. It is the oblique case of the nominative trobaire "composer", related to trobar "to compose, to discuss, to invent" (Wace, Brut, editions I. Arnold, 3342). Trobar may come, in turn, from the hypothetical Late Latin *tropāre "to compose, to invent a poem" by regular phonetic change. This reconstructed form is based on the Latin root tropus, meaning a trope. In turn, the Latin word derives ultimately from Greek τρόπος (trópos), meaning "turn, manner". Intervocal Latin [p] shifted regularly to [b] in Occitan (cf. Latin sapere → Occitan saber, French savoir "to know"). The Latin suffix -ātor, -ātōris explains the Occitan suffix, according to its declension and accentuation: Gallo-Romance *tropātor → Occitan trobaire (subject case) and *tropātōre → Occitan trobador (oblique case).

There is an alternative theory to explain the meaning of trobar as "to compose, to discuss, to invent". It has the support of some historians, specialists of literature, and musicologists to justify the troubadours' origins in Arabic Andalusian musical practices. According to them, the Arabic word ṭaraba "music" (from the triliteral root ṭ–r–b ط ر ب "provoke emotion, excitement, agitation; make music, entertain by singing" as in طرب أندلسي, ṭarab ʾandalusī) could partly be the etymon of the verb trobar. Another Arabic root had already been proposed before: ḍ–r–b (ض ر ب) "strike", by extension "play a musical instrument".

In archaic and classical troubadour poetry, the word is only used in a mocking sense, having more or less the meaning of "somebody who makes things up". Cercamon writes:

Ist trobador, entre ver e mentir,
Afollon drutz e molhers et espos,
E van dizen qu'Amors vay en biays

(These troubadours, between truth and lies/corrupt lovers, women and husbands, / and keep saying that Love proceeds obliquely).

Peire d'Alvernha also begins his famous mockery of contemporary authors cantarai d'aquest trobadors, after which he proceeds to explain why none of them is worth anything. When referring to themselves seriously, troubadours almost invariably use the word chantaire ("singer").

== Origins ==
The early study of the troubadours focused intensely on their origins. No academic consensus was ever achieved in the area. Today, one can distinguish at least eleven competing theories (the adjectives used below are a blend from the Grove Dictionary of Music and Roger Boase's The Origins and Meaning of Courtly Love):

=== Arabic ===
The sixteenth century Italian historian Giammaria Barbieri was perhaps the first to suggest Arabian (also Arabist or Hispano-Arabic) influences on the music of the troubadours. Later scholars like J.B. Trend have asserted that the poetry of troubadours is connected to Arabic poetry written in the Iberian Peninsula, while others have attempted to find direct evidence of this influence. In examining the works of William IX of Aquitaine, Évariste Lévi-Provençal and other scholars found three lines that they believed were in some form of Arabic, indicating a potential Andalusian origin for his works. The scholars attempted to translate the lines in question, though the medievalist Istvan Frank contended that the lines were not Arabic at all, but instead the result of the rewriting of the original by a later scribe.

Scholars like Ramón Menéndez Pidal stated that the troubadour tradition was created by William, who had been influenced by Moorish music and poetry while fighting with the Reconquista. However, George T. Beech states that there is only one documented battle that William fought in the Iberian Peninsula, and it occurred towards the end of his life. Beech adds that while the sources of William's inspirations are uncertain, he and his father did have individuals within their extended family with Iberian origins, and he may have been friendly with some Europeans who could speak the Arabic language. Regardless of William's personal involvement in the tradition's creation, Magda Bogin states that Arab poetry was likely one of several influences on European "courtly love poetry", citing Ibn Hazm's "The Ring of the Dove" as an example of a similar Arab tradition.

Methods of transmission from Arab Iberia to the rest of Europe did exist, such as the Toledo School of Translators, though it only began translating major romances from Arabic into Latin in the second half of the thirteenth century, with objectionable sexual content removed in deference to the Catholic Church.

=== Bernardine-Marianist ===
According to the Bernardine-Marianist (or Christian) theory, it was the theology espoused by Bernard of Clairvaux and the increasingly important Mariology that most strongly influenced the development of the troubadour genre. Specifically, the emphasis on religious and spiritual love, disinterestedness, mysticism, and devotion to Mary explained "courtly love". The emphasis of the reforming Robert of Arbrissel on "matronage" to achieve his ends can explain the troubadour attitude towards women.

Chronologically, however, this hypothesis is hard to sustain, as the forces believed to have given rise to the phenomenon arrived later than it, but the influence of Bernardine and Marian theology can be retained without the origins theory. This theory was advanced early by Eduard Wechssler and further by Dmitri Scheludko (who emphasises the Cluniac Reform) and Guido Errante. Mario Casella and Leo Spitzer have added "Augustinian" influence to it.

=== Celtic or chivalric-matriarchal ===
The survival of pre-Christian sexual mores and warrior codes from matriarchal societies, be they Celtic, Germanic, or Pictish, among the aristocracy of Europe can account for the idea (fusion) of "courtly love". The existence of pre-Christian matriarchy has usually been treated with scepticism as has the persistence of underlying paganism in high medieval Europe, though the Celts and Germanic tribes were certainly less patriarchal than the Greco-Romans.

=== Classical Latin ===
The classical Latin theory emphasises parallels between Ovid, especially his Amores and Ars amatoria, and the lyric of courtly love. The aetas ovidiana that predominated in the 11th century in and around Orléans, the quasi-Ciceronian ideology that held sway in the Imperial court, and the scraps of Plato then available to scholars have all been cited as classical influences on troubadour poetry.

=== Crypto-Cathar ===
According to this thesis, troubadour poetry is a reflection of Cathar religious doctrine. While the theory is supported by the traditional and near-universal account of the decline of the troubadours coinciding with the suppression of Catharism during the Albigensian Crusade (first half of the 13th century), support for it has come in waves. The explicitly Catholic meaning of many early troubadour works also works against the theory.

=== Liturgical ===
The troubadour lyric may be a development of the Christian liturgy and hymnody. The influence of the Song of Songs has even been suggested. There is no preceding Latin poetry resembling that of the troubadours. On those grounds, no theory of the latter's origins in classical or post-classical Latin can be constructed, but that has not deterred some, who believe that a pre-existing Latin corpus must merely be lost to us. That many troubadours received their grammatical training in Latin through the Church (from clerici, clerics) and that many were trained musically by the Church is well-attested. The musical school of Saint Martial's at Limoges has been singled out in this regard. "Para-liturgical" tropes were in use there in the era preceding the troubadours' appearance.

=== Feudal-social ===
This theory or set of related theories has gained ground in the 20th century. It is more a methodological approach to the question than a theory; it asks not from where the content or form of the lyric came but rather in what situation or circumstances did it arise. Under Marxist influence, Erich Köhler, Marc Bloch, and Georges Duby have suggested that the "essential hegemony" in the castle of the lord's wife during his absence was a driving force. The use of feudal terminology in troubadour poems is seen as evidence. This theory has been developed away from sociological towards psychological explanation.

=== Folklore ===
This theory may relate to spring folk rituals. According to María Rosa Menocal, Alfred Jeanroy first suggested that folklore and oral tradition gave rise to troubadour poetry in 1883. According to F. M. Warren, it was Gaston Paris, Jeanroy's reviewer, in 1891 who first located troubadour origins in the festive dances of women hearkening the spring in the Loire Valley. This theory has since been widely discredited, but the discovery of the jarchas raises the question of the extent of literature (oral or written) in the 11th century and earlier.

=== Medieval Latin or Goliardic ===
Hans Spanke analysed the intertextual connexion between vernacular and medieval Latin (such as Goliardic) songs. This theory is supported by Reto Bezzola, Peter Dronke, and musicologist Jacques Chailley. According to them, trobar means "inventing a trope", the trope being a poem where the words are used with a meaning different from their common signification, i.e. metaphor and metonymy. This poem was originally inserted in a serial of modulations ending a liturgic song. Then the trope became an autonomous piece organized in stanza form. The influence of late 11th-century poets of the "Loire school", such as Marbod of Rennes and Hildebert of Lavardin, is stressed in this connexion by Brinkmann.

=== Neoplatonic ===
This theory is one of the more intellectualising. The "ennobling effects of love" in specific have been identified as neoplatonic. It is viewed either as a strength or weakness that this theory requires a second theory about how the neoplatonism was transmitted to the troubadours; perhaps it can be coupled with one of the other origins stories or perhaps it is just peripheral. Käte Axhausen has "exploited" this theory and A. J. Denomy has linked it with the Arabist (through Avicenna) and the Cathar (through John Scotus Eriugena).

== History ==
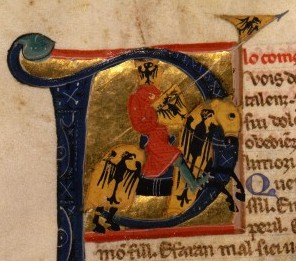
William IX of Aquitaine portrayed as a knight, who first composed poetry on returning from the Crusade of 1101

=== Early period ===
The earliest troubadour whose work survives is Guilhèm de Peitieus, better known as Duke William IX of Aquitaine (1071–1126). Peter Dronke, author of The Medieval Lyric, however, believes that "[his] songs represent not the beginnings of a tradition but summits of achievement in that tradition." His name has been preserved because he was the Duke of Aquitaine, but his work plays with already established structures; Eble II of Ventadorn is often credited as a predecessor, though none of his work survives. Orderic Vitalis referred to William composing songs about his experiences on his return from the Crusade of 1101 (c. 1102). This may be the earliest reference to troubadour lyrics. Orderic also provides us (1135) with what may be the first description of a troubadour performance: an eyewitness account of William of Aquitaine.

Picauensis uero dux ... miserias captiuitatis suae ... coram regibus et magnatis atque Christianis coetibus multotiens retulit rythmicis uersibus cum facetis modulationibus. (X.21)

Then the Poitevin duke ... the miseries of his captivity ... before kings, magnates, and Christian assemblies many times related with rhythmic verses and witty measures.

=== Spread ===
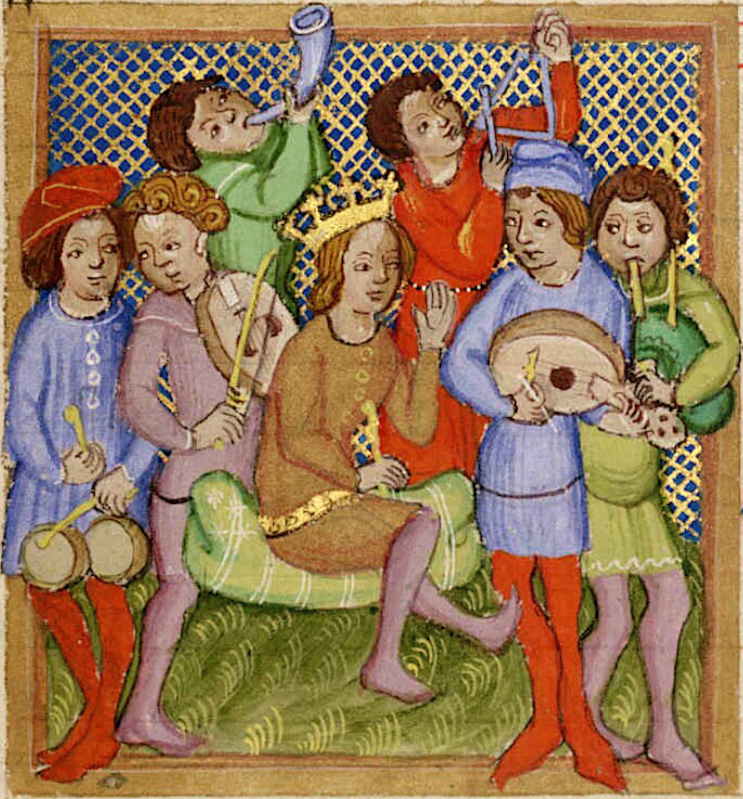
Trobadours, 14th century

The first half of the 12th century saw relatively few recorded troubadours. Only in the last decades of the century did troubadour activity explode. Almost half of all troubadour works that survive are from the period 1180–1220. In total, moreover, there are over 2,500 troubadour lyrics available to be studied as linguistic artifacts (Akehurst, 23). The troubadour tradition seems to have begun in western Aquitaine (Poitou and Saintonge) and Gascony, from there spreading over into eastern Aquitaine (Limousin and Auvergne) and Provence. At its height it had become popular in Languedoc and the regions of Rouergue, Toulouse, and Quercy (c. 1200). Finally, in the early 13th century it began to spread into first Italy and then Catalonia, whence to the rest of modern Spain and then Portugal. This development has been called the rayonnement des troubadours (pronounced [ʁɛjɔnəmɑ̃ de tʁubaduːʁ]).

=== Classical period ===
The classical period of troubadour activity lasted from about 1170 until about 1213. The most famous names among the ranks of troubadours belong to this period. During this period the lyric art of the troubadours reached the height of its popularity and the number of surviving poems is greatest from this period. During this period the canso, or love song, became distinguishable as a genre. The master of the canso and the troubadour who epitomises the classical period is Bernart de Ventadorn. He was highly regarded by his contemporaries, as were Giraut de Bornelh, reputed by his biographer to be the greatest composer of melodies to ever live, and Bertran de Born, the master of the sirventes, or political song, which became increasingly popular in this period.

The classical period came to be seen by later generations, especially in the 14th and 15th centuries and outside of Occitania, as representing the high point of lyric poetry and models to be emulated. The language of the classic poets, its grammar and vocabulary, their style and themes, were the ideal to which poets of the troubadour revival in Toulouse (creation of the Consistori del Gay Saber in 1323) and their Catalan and Castilian contemporaries aspired. During the classical period the "rules" of poetic composition had first become standardised and written down, first by Raimon Vidal and then by Uc Faidit.

== Lives ==
The 450 or so troubadours known to historians came from a variety of backgrounds. They made their living in a variety of ways, lived, and travelled in many different places, and were actors in many types of social context. The troubadours were not wandering entertainers. Typically, they stayed in one place for a lengthy period of time under the patronage of a wealthy nobleman or woman. Many did travel extensively, however, sojourning at one court and then another.

=== Status ===
The earliest known troubadour, the Duke of Aquitaine, came from the high nobility. He was followed immediately by two poets of unknown origins, known only by their sobriquets, Cercamon and Marcabru, and by a member of the princely class, Jaufre Rudel. Many troubadours are described in their vidas as poor knights. It was one of the most common descriptors of status. Berenguier de Palazol, Gausbert Amiel, Guilhem Ademar, Guiraudo lo Ros, Marcabru, Peire de Maensac, Peirol, Raimon de Miraval, Rigaut de Berbezilh, and Uc de Pena are also described. Albertet de Sestaro is described as the son of a noble Jongleur, presumably a petty noble lineage.

Later troubadours especially could belong to lower classes, ranging from the middle class of merchants and "burgers" (persons of urban standing) to tradesmen and others who worked with their hands. Salh d'Escola and Elias de Barjols were described as the sons of merchants and Elias Fonsalada was the son of a burger and jongleur. Perdigon was the son of a "poor fisherman" and Elias Cairel of a blacksmith. Arnaut de Mareuil is specified in his vida as coming from a poor family, but whether this family was poor by noble standards or materially is not apparent.

Many troubadours also possessed a clerical education. For some this was their springboard to composition, since their clerical education equipped them with an understanding of musical and poetic forms as well as vocal training. The vidas of the following troubadours note their clerical status: Aimeric de Belenoi, Folquet de Marselha (who became a bishop), Gui d'Ussel, Guillem Ramon de Gironella, Jofre de Foixà (who became an abbot), Peire de Bussignac, Peire Rogier, Raimon de Cornet, Uc Brunet, and Uc de Saint Circ.

=== Trobadors and joglars ===
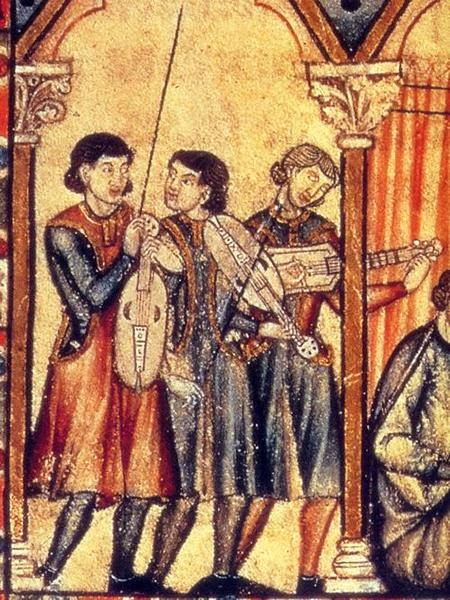
Musicians in the time of the Cantigas de Santa Maria. These were in the court of the king, two vielle players and one citoler.

The Occitan words trobador and trobaire are relatively rare compared with the verb trobar (compose, invent), which was usually applied to the writing of poetry. It signified that a poem was original to an author (trobador) and was not merely sung or played by one. The term was used mostly for poetry only and in more careful works, like the vidas, is not generally applied to the composition of music or to singing, though the troubadour's poetry itself is not so careful. Sometime in the middle of the 12th century, however, a distinction was definitely being made between an inventor of original verse and the performers of others'. The latter were called joglars in both Occitan and Catalan, from the Latin ioculatores, giving rise also to the French jongleur, Castilian juglar, and English juggler, which has come to refer to a more specific breed of performer. The medieval jongleur/joglar is really a minstrel.

At the height of troubadour poetry (the "classical period"), troubadours are often found attacking jongleurs and at least two small genres arose around the theme: the ensenhamen joglaresc and the sirventes joglaresc. These terms are debated, however, since the adjective joglaresc seems to imply "in the manner of the jongleurs". Inevitably, however, pieces of these genres are verbal attacks at jongleurs, in general and in specific, with named individuals being called out. It is clear, for example from the poetry of Bertran de Born, that jongleurs were performers who did not usually compose. They often performed the troubadours' songs: singing, playing instruments, dancing, and even doing acrobatics. (Note: The earliest reference to the basse danse comes from Raimon de Cornet, who attributes it to the jongleurs of the mid-14th century.)

In the late 13th century Guiraut Riquier bemoaned the inexactness of his contemporaries and wrote a letter to Alfonso X of Castile, a noted patron of literature and learning of all kinds, for clarification on the proper reference of the terms trobador and joglar. According to Riquier, every vocation deserved a name of its own and the sloppy usage of joglar assured that it covered a multitude of activities, some, no doubt, with which Riquier did not wish to be associated. In the end Riquier argued—and Alfonso X seems to agree, though his "response" was probably penned by Riquier—that a joglar was a courtly entertainer (as opposed to popular or low-class one) and a troubadour was a poet and composer.

Despite the distinctions noted, many troubadours were also known as jongleurs, either before they began composing or alongside. Aimeric de Belenoi, Aimeric de Sarlat, Albertet Cailla, Arnaut de Mareuil, Elias de Barjols, Elias Fonsalada, Falquet de Romans, Guillem Magret, Guiraut de Calanso, Nicoletto da Torino, Peire Raimon de Tolosa, Peire Rogier, Peire de Valeira, Peirol, Pistoleta, Perdigon, Salh d'Escola, Uc de la Bacalaria, Uc Brunet, and Uc de Saint Circ were jongleur-troubadours.

=== Vidas and razos ===
A vida is a brief prose biography, written in Occitan, of a troubadour. The word vida means "life" in Occitan. In the chansonniers, the manuscript collections of medieval troubadour poetry, the works of a particular author are often accompanied by a short prose biography. The vidas are important early works of vernacular prose nonfiction. Nevertheless, it appears that many of them derive their facts from literal readings of their objects' poems, which leaves their historical reliability in doubt. Most of the vidas were composed in Italy in the 1220s, many by Uc de Saint Circ.

A razo (from Occitan for "reason") was a similar short piece of Occitan prose detailing the circumstances of a particular composition. A razo normally introduced the poem it explained; it might, however, share some of the characteristics of a vida. The razos suffer from the same problems as the vidas in terms of reliability. Many are likewise the work of Uc de Saint Circ.

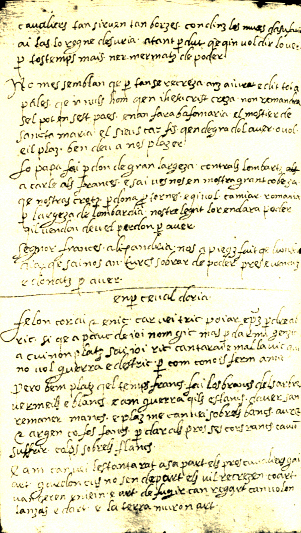
Late 16th-century Italian cursive on paper, recording a song of Perceval Doria

=== Podestà-troubadours ===
A phenomenon arose in Italy, recognised around the turn of the 20th century by Giulio Bertoni, of men serving in several cities as podestàs on behalf of either the Guelph or Ghibelline party and writing political verse in Occitan rhyme. These figures generally came from the urban middle class. They aspired to high culture and though, unlike the nobility, they were not patrons of literature, they were its disseminators and its readers.

The first podestà-troubadour was Rambertino Buvalelli, possibly the first troubadour native to the Italian Peninsula, who was podestà of Genoa between 1218 and 1221. Rambertino, a Guelph, served at one time or another as podestà of Brescia, Milan, Parma, Mantua, and Verona. It was probably during his three-year tenure there that he introduced Occitan lyric poetry to the city, which was later to develop a flourishing Occitan literary culture.

Among the podestà-troubadours to follow Rambertino, four were from Genoa: the Guelphs Luca Grimaldi, who also served in Florence, Milan, and Ventimiglia, and Luchetto Gattilusio, who served in Milan, Cremona, and Bologna, and the Ghibellines Perceval Doria, who served in Arles, Avignon, Asti, and Parma, and Simon Doria, sometime podestà of Savona and Albenga. Among the non-Genoese podestà-troubadours was Alberico da Romano, a nobleman of high rank who governed Vicenza and Treviso as variously a Ghibelline and a Guelph. He was a patron as well as a composer of Occitan lyric.

Mention should be made of the Provençal troubadour Isnart d'Entrevenas, who was podestà of Arles in 1220, though he does not fit the phenomenon Giulio Bertoni first identified in Italy.

=== Trobairitz ===
The trobairitz were the female troubadours, the first female composers of secular music in the Western tradition. The word trobairitz was first used in the 13th-century Romance of Flamenca and its derivation is the same as that of trobaire but in feminine form. There were also female counterparts to the joglars: the joglaresas. The number of trobairitz varies between sources: there were twenty or twenty-one named trobairitz, plus an additional poet known only as Domna H. There are several anonymous texts ascribed to women; the total number of trobairitz texts varies from twenty-two (Schultz-Gora), twenty-five (Bec), thirty-six (Bruckner, Shepard, and White), and forty-six (Rieger). Only one melody composed by a trobairitz (the Comtessa de Dia) survives. Out of a total of about 450 troubadours and 2,500 troubadour works, the trobairitz and their corpus form a minor but interesting and informative portion. They are, therefore, quite well studied.

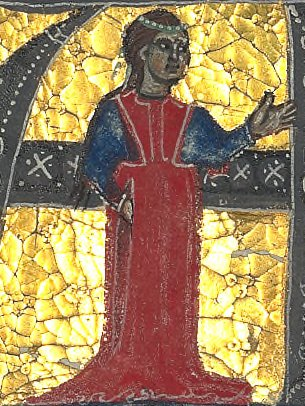
Castelloza

The trobairitz were in most respects as varied a lot as their male counterparts, with the general exceptions of their poetic style and their provenance. They wrote predominantly cansos and tensos; only one sirventes by a named woman, Gormonda de Monpeslier, survives (though two anonymous ones are attributed to women). One salut d'amor, by a woman (Azalais d'Altier) to a woman (Clara d'Anduza) is also extant and one anonymous planh is usually assigned a female authorship. They wrote almost entirely within the trobar leu style; only two poems, one by Lombarda and another Alais, Yselda, and Carenza, are usually considered to belong to the more demanding trobar clus. None of the trobairitz were prolific, or if they were their work has not survived. Only two have left us more than one piece: the Comtessa de Dia, with four, and Castelloza, with three or four. One of the known trobairitz, Gaudairença, wrote a song entitled Coblas e dansas, which has not survived; no other piece of hers has either.

The trobairitz came almost to a woman from Occitania. There are representatives from the Auvergne, Provence, Languedoc, the Dauphiné, Toulousain, and the Limousin. One trobairitz, Ysabella, may have been born in Périgord, Northern Italy, Greece, or Palestine. All the trobairitz whose families we know were high-born ladies; only one, Lombarda, was probably of the merchant class. All the trobairitz known by name lived around the same time: the late 12th and the early 13th century (c. 1170 – c. 1260). The earliest was probably Tibors de Sarenom, who was active in the 1150s (the date of her known composition is uncertain). The latest was either Garsenda of Forcalquier, who died in 1242, though her period of poetic patronage and composition probably occurred a quarter century earlier, or Guilleuma de Rosers, who composed a tenso with Lanfranc Cigala, known between 1235 and 1257. There exist brief prose biographies—vidas—for eight trobairitz: Almucs de Castelnau (actually a razo), Azalais de Porcairagues, the Comtessa de Dia, Castelloza, Iseut de Capio (also a razo), Lombarda, Maria de Ventadorn, and Tibors de Sarenom.

== Works ==
=== Schools and styles ===
Three main styles of Occitan lyric poetry have been identified: the trobar leu (light), trobar ric (rich), and trobar clus (closed, hermetic). The first was by far the most common: the wording is straightforward and relatively simple compared to the ric and literary devices are less common than in the clus. This style was the most accessible and it was immensely popular. The most famous poet of the trobar leu was Bernart de Ventadorn. The trobar clus regularly escapes modern scholarly interpretation. Words are commonly used metaphorically and symbolically and what a poem appears to be about on its surface is rarely what is intended by the poet or understood by audiences "in the know". The clus style was invented early by Marcabru but only favoured by a few masters thereafter. The trobar ric style is not as opaque as the clus, rather it employs a rich vocabulary, using many words, rare words, invented words, and unusual, colourful wordings.

Modern scholars recognise several "schools" in the troubadour tradition. Among the earliest is a school of followers of Marcabru, sometimes called the "Marcabrunian school": Bernart Marti, Bernart de Venzac, Gavaudan, and Peire d'Alvernhe. These poets favoured the trobar clus or ric or a hybrid of the two. They were often moralising in tone and critical of contemporary courtly society.

Another early school, whose style seems to have fallen out of favour, was the "Gascon school" of Cercamon, Peire de Valeira, and Guiraut de Calanso. Cercamon was said by his biographer to have composed in the "old style" (la uzansa antiga) and Guiraut's songs were d'aquella saison ("of that time"). This style of poetry seems to be attached to early troubadours from Gascony and was characterised by references to nature: leaves, flowers, birds, and their songs. This Gascon "literary fad" was unpopular in Provence in the early 13th century, harming the reputation of the poets associated with it.

In the late 13th century (1260s-1280s) a school arose at Béziers, once the centre of pre-Albigensian Languedoc and of the Trencavel lordships. Four poets epitomize this "school": Bernart d'Auriac, Joan Esteve, Joan Miralhas, and Raimon Gaucelm. The latter three were natives of Béziers and all four lived there. They were all members of the urban middle class, not courtesans: Miralhas was possibly a potter and Bernart was a mayestre (teacher). All wrote in Occitan but were supporters of the French king Louis IX and the French aristocracy against the native Occitan nobility. They have been described as "Gallicised". Raimon Gaucelm supported the Eighth Crusade and even wrote a planh, the only known one of its kind, to a burgher of Béziers. Joan Esteve and Bernart both composed in support of the French in the Aragonese Crusade. The Béziers poets are an example of how Occitania transformed in the aftermath of the Albigensian Crusade.

=== Genres ===
Troubadours, at least once their style solidified, usually followed some set of "rules", like those of the Leys d'amors (compiled between 1328 and 1337).

Initially all troubadour verses were simply called vers, yet soon this was reserved for love songs and later replaced by canso. The term vers lived on as an antique expression for the troubadours' early works, and was even given a more technical meaning by the last generation of troubadours (mid-14th century), when it was thought to derive from the Latin word verus (truth). Vers was thus used to describe moralizing or didactic pieces.

The early troubadours developed many genres and these only proliferated as rules of composition came to be put in writing. The known genres are:

- Alba (morning song) – the song of a lover as dawn approaches, often with a watchman warning of the approach of a lady's jealous husband
- Arlabecca – a song defined by poetic metre, but perhaps once related to the rebec
- Canso, originally vers, also chanso or canço – the love song, usually consisting of five or six stanzas with an envoi
- Cobla esparsa – a stand-alone stanza
- Comiat – a song renouncing a lover
- Crusade song (canso de crozada) – a song about the Crusades, usually encouraging them
- Dansa or balada – a lively dance song with a refrain
- Descort – a song heavily discordant in verse form and/or feeling
- Desdansa – a dance designed for sad occasions
- Devinalh – a riddle or cryptogram
- Ensenhamen – a long didactic poem, usually not divided into stanzas, teaching a moral or practical lesson
- Enuig – a poem expressing indignation or feelings of insult
- Escondig – a lover's apology
- Estampida – a dance-like song
- Gap – a boasting song, often presented as a challenge, often similar to modern sports chants
- Maldit – a song complaining about a lady's behaviour and character
- Partimen – a poetical exchange between two or more poets in which one is presented with a dilemma by another and responds
- Pastorela – the tale of the love request of a knight to a shepherdess
- Planh – a lament, especially on the death of some important figure
- Plazer – a poem expressing pleasure
- Salut d'amor – a love letter addressed to another, not always one's lover
- Serena – the song of a lover waiting impatiently for the evening (to consummate his love)
- Sestina – highly structured verse form
- Sirventes – a political poem or satire, originally put in the mouth of a paid soldier (sirvens)
- Sonnet (sonet) – an Italian genre imported into Occitan verse in the 13th century
- Tenso – a poetical debate which was usually an exchange between two poets, but could be fictional
- Torneyamen – a poetical debate between three or more persons, often with a judge (like a tournament)
- Viadeira – a traveller's complaint

All these genres were highly fluid. A cross between a sirventes and a canso was a meg-sirventes (half-sirventes). (Note: Sometimes canso-sirventes or sirventes-canso was used. Bertran de Born uses the term miei sirventes.) A tenso could be "invented" by a single poet; an alba or canso could be written with religious significance, addressed to God or the Virgin; and a sirventes may be nothing more than a political attack. The maldit and the comiat were often connected as a maldit-comiat and they could be used to attack and renounce a figure other than a lady or a lover, like a commanding officer (when combined, in a way, with the sirventes).

Peire Bremon Ricas Novas uses the term mieja chanso (half song) and Cerverí de Girona uses a similar phrase, miga canço, both to refer to a short canso and not a mixture of genres as sometimes supposed. Cerverí's mig (or meig) vers e miga canço was a vers in the new sense (a moralising song) that was also highly critical and thus combined the canso and the sirventes. Among the more than one hundred works of Cerverí de Girona are many songs with unique labels, which may correspond more to "titles" than "genres", but that is debatable: peguesca (nonsense), espingadura (flageolet song), libel (legal petition), esdemessa (leap), somni (dream), acuyndamen (challenge), desirança (nostalgia), aniversari (anniversary), serena (serene).

Most "Crusading songs" are classified either as cansos or sirventes but sometimes separately. Some styles became popular in other languages and in other literary or musical traditions. In French, the alba became the aubade, the pastorela the pastourelle, and the partimen the jeu parti. The sestina became popular in Italian literature. The troubadours were not averse to borrowing either. The planh developed out of the Latin planctus and the sonnet was stolen from the Sicilian School. The basse danse (bassa dansa) was first mentioned in the troubadour tradition (c. 1324), but only as being performed by jongleurs.

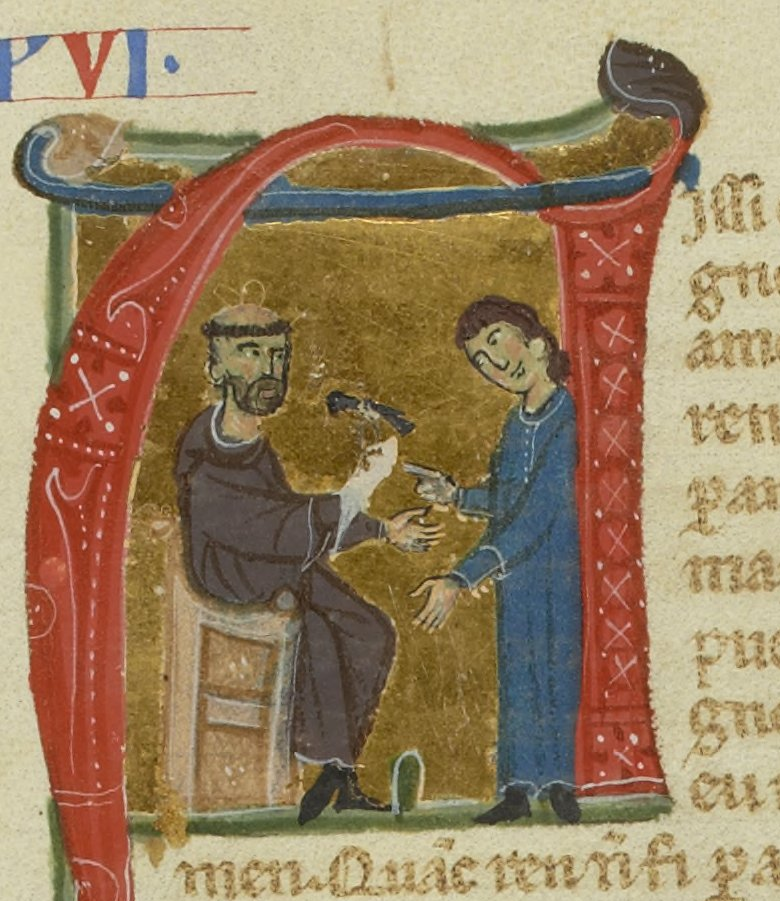
The Monge de Montaudon receiving a sparrow hawk as a prize for his performance in a contest

=== Performance ===
Troubadours performed their own songs. Jongleurs (performers) and cantaires (singers) also performed troubadours' songs. They could work from chansonniers, many of which have survived, or possibly from more rudimentary (and temporary) songbooks, none of which have survived, if they even existed. Some troubadours, like Arnaut de Maruelh, had their own jongleurs who were dedicated to singing their patron's work. Arnaut's joglar et cantaire, probably both a singer and a messenger, who carried his love songs to his lady, was Pistoleta. The messenger was commonplace in troubadour poetry; many songs reference a messenger who will bring it to its intended ear. A troubadour often stayed with a noble patron of his own and entertained his court with his songs. Court songs could be used not only as entertainment but also as propaganda, praising the patron, mocking his enemies, encouraging his wars, teaching ethics and etiquette, and maintaining religious unity.

The court was not the only venue for troubadour performance. Competitions were held from an early date. According to the vida of the Monge de Montaudon, he received a sparrow hawk, a prized hunting bird, for his poetry from the cour du Puy, some sort of poetry society associated with the court of Alfonso II of Aragon. The most famous contests were held in the twilight of the troubadours in the 14th and 15th centuries. The jocs florals held by the Consistori del Gay Saber at Toulouse, by Peter IV of Aragon at Lleida, and the Consistori de la Gaya Sciència at Barcelona awarded floral prizes to the best poetry in various categories, judging it by its accordance with a code called the Leys d'amors.

Troubadour songs are still performed and recorded today, albeit rarely.

A chantar m'er
The only existing song by a trobairitz which survives with music.

=== Music ===
Troubadour songs were usually monophonic. Fewer than 300 melodies out of an estimated 2500 survive. Most were composed by the troubadours themselves. Some were set to pre-existing pieces of music. Raimbaut de Vaqueyras wrote his Kalenda maya ("The Calends of May") to music composed by jongleurs at Montferrat.

=== Grammars and dictionaries ===
Beginning in the early 13th century, the spread of Occitan verse demanded grammars and dictionaries, especially for those whose native tongue was not Occitan, such as the Catalan and Italian troubadours, and their imitators. The production of such works only increased with the academisation of the troubadour lyric in the 14th century.

Image	Title	Translation of title	Author	Date, place	Character
	Razos de trobar	"Explanations of composition"	Raimon Vidal	c. 1210	Prose guide to poetic composition that defends the superiority of Occitan over other vernaculars. Occitan–Italian dictionary.
	Donatz proensals	"Provençal Donatus"	Uc Faidit	c. 1243	An Occitan imitation of Latin grammarian Aelius Donatus. A rhymary and Latin–Occitan dictionary designed for Italians.
	Doctrina de compondre dictats	"Doctrinal of understanding sayings"	Anonymous, possibly Raimon Vidal	late 13th century	A catalogue and explanation of the different poetic genres. It expands on the Razos and may be the concluding section of the Regles of Jaufre de Foixa.
	Lo breviari d'amors	"Breviary of love"	Matfre Ermengau	begun 1288	A pious encyclopedia, the last section of which, "Perilhos tractatz d'amor de donas, seguon qu'en han tractat li antic trobador en lurs cansos", is an Occitan grammar.
	Doctrina d'acort (Note: Sometimes Doctrina de cort: "Doctrinal of court".)	"Doctrinal of concordance"	Terramagnino da Pisa	1282–96, Sardinia	A condensed verse adaptation of the Razos, poorly preserved in the manuscripts.
	Regles de trobar (Note: Sometimes Vers e regles de trobar: "Verses and rules of composition".)	"Rules of composition"	Jaufre de Foixa	1289–91, Sicily	Contains many examples of troubadour verse, designed to augment the Razos de trobar.
	Mirall de trobar	"Mirror of composition"	Berenguer d'Anoia	early 14th century	Mainly covers rhetoric and errors, and is littered with examples of troubadour verse.
	Cançoneret de Ripoll	"Little Chansonnier of Ripoll"	Anonymous	1346, Roussillon or Cerdagne	A chansonnier containing a unique grammar, including a catalogue of poetic genres, expands on the Doctrina de compondre dictats and the Leys d'amors.
	Leys d'amors (Note: Fully Las flors del Gay Saber, estiers dichas las leys d'amors: "The flowers of the Gay Science, which are called the laws of love".)	"Laws of love"	Guilhem Molinier	1328–37, Toulouse	First commissioned in 1323. Prose rules governing the Consistori del Gay Saber and the Consistori de Barcelona.
	Leys d'amors	"Laws of love"	Anonymous	1337–47, Toulouse	Verse adaptation of the prose Leys.
	Leys d'amors	"Laws of love"	Joan de Castellnou	1355, Toulouse	Final, expanded, prose version of the previous Leys.
	Doctrinal de trobar	"Doctrinal of composition"	Raimon de Cornet	c. 1324 (before 1341)	Dedicated to Peter IV of Aragon, identical in structure to the Leys of Guilhem Molinier.
	Glosari	"Glossary"	Joan de Castellnou	1341	A commentary on the Doctrinal de trobar.
	Compendi (Note: Fully Compendi de la conexença dels vicis que.s podon esdevenir en las dictats del Gay Saber: "Compendium of the knowledge of the vices that can be expressed in the Gay Science".)	"Compendium"	Joan de Castellnou	before 1341	A catalogue of all the "vices" one can commit by transgressing the Leys etc.
	Libre de concordances (or Diccionari de rims)	"Book of concordances" (or "Dictionary of rhymes")	Jaume March II	1371	An Occitan rhymary for Catalans.
	Torcimany	"Translation"	Luys d'Averçó	late 14th century	A rhymary and Catalan–Occitan dictionary.

== Legacy ==
=== Transmission ===
Some 2,600 poems or fragments of poems have survived from around 450 identifiable troubadours. They are largely preserved in songbooks called chansonniers made for wealthy patrons.

Troubadour songs are generally referred to by their incipits, that is, their opening lines. If this is long, or after it has already been mentioned, an abbreviation of the incipit may be used for convenience. A few troubadour songs are known by "nicknames", thus D'un sirventes far by Guilhem Figueira is commonly called the Sirventes contra Roma. When a writer seeks to avoid using unglossed Occitan, the incipit of the song may be given in translation instead or a title may even be invented to reflect the theme of the work. Especially in translations designed for a popular audience, such as Ezra Pound's, English titles are commonly invented by the translator/editor. There are examples, however, of troubadour songs given Occitan titles in the manuscripts, such as an anonymous pastorela that begins Mentre per una ribeira, which is entitled Porquieira.

=== Table of chansonniers ===
The number of Occitan parchment chansonniers given as extant varies between authors, depending on how they treat fragmentary and multilingual manuscripts. Conventionally, fragments are classified as fragments of the surviving chansonnier they most closely resemble and not as chansonniers in their own right. Some chansonniers have received both Occitan and French letters: troubadour D is trouvère H, W is M and X is U. The lettering (siglas) was introduced by Karl Bartsch, who placed sources he considered more reliable higher in the alphabet. This system is imperfect, however, since many of the chansonniers produced for an Italian audience are heavily edited and do not necessarily more closely resemble the original compositions. While parchment chansonniers are more durable, paper ones also exist and have received lower-case siglas.

Image	Troubadour manuscript letter (sigla)	Provenance (place of origin, date)	Location (library, city)	Shelfmark (with external link to digitization, where available)	Notes
	A	Lombardy, 13th century	Biblioteca Vaticana, Rome	Latin 5232	
	B	Occitania, 13th century	Bibliothèque nationale de France, Paris	BN f.f. 1592	
	C	Occitania, 14th century	Bibliothèque nationale de France, Paris	BN f.f. 856	
	D	Lombardy, 12 August 1254	Biblioteca Estense, Modena	α.R.4.4 = Kg.4.MS2 = E.45	The Poetarum Provinciali.
	E	Occitania, 14th century	Bibliothèque nationale de France, Paris	BN f.f. 1749	
	F	Lombardy, 14th century	Biblioteca Vaticana, Rome	Chigi L.IV.106	
	G	Lombardy or Venetia, late 13th century	Biblioteca Ambrosiana, Milan	R 71 sup.	Contains troubadour music.
	H	Lombardy, late 13th century	Biblioteca Vaticana, Rome	Latin 3207	
	I	Lombardy, 13th century	Bibliothèque nationale de France, Paris	BN f.f. 854	
	J	Occitania, 14th century	Biblioteca Nazionale, Florence	Conventi Soppressi F.IV.776	
	K	Lombardy, 13th century	Bibliothèque nationale de France, Paris	BN f.f. 12473	
	L	Lombardy, 14th century	Biblioteca Vaticana, Rome	Latin 3206	
	M	Lombardy, 14th century	Bibliothèque nationale de France, Paris	BN f.f. 12474	
	N	Italy, ca. 1285-1300	Pierpont Morgan, New York	819	The Philipps Manuscript.
	O	Lombardy, 14th century	Biblioteca Vaticana, Rome	Latin 3208	
	P	Lombardy, 1310	Biblioteca Laurenziana, Florence	Plut.XLI.42	
	Q	Lombardy, 14th century	Biblioteca Riccardiana, Florence	2909 (diplomatic edition)	
	R	Toulousain or Rouergue, 14th century	Bibliothèque nationale de France, Paris	BN f.f. 22543	Contains more troubadour music than any other manuscript. Perhaps produced for Henry II of Rodez.
	S	Lombardy, 13th century	Bodleian Library, Oxford	Douce 269	
	Sg	Catalonia, 14th century	Biblioteca de Catalunya, Barcelona	146	The famous Cançoner Gil. Called Z in the reassignment of letter names by François Zufferey.
	T	Lombardy, late 13th century	Bibliothèque nationale de France, Paris	BN f.f. 15211	
	U	Lombardy, 14th century	Biblioteca Laurenziana, Florence	Plut.XLI.43	
	V	Catalonia, 1268	Biblioteca Marciana, Venice	fr. App. cod. XI	
	W	perhaps Artois, 1254–c. 1280	Bibliothèque nationale de France, Paris	BN f.f. 844	Also trouvère manuscript M. Contains the chansonnier du roi of Theobald I of Navarre. Possibly produced for Charles I of Naples. Contains troubadour music.
	X	Lorraine, 13th century	Bibliothèque nationale de France, Paris	BN f.f. 20050	Chansonnier de Saint-Germain-des-Prés. Also trouvère manuscript U and therefore has marks of French influence. Contains troubadour music. Owned by Saint-Germain-des-Prés in the 18th century.
	Y	Lorraine, 14th century	Bibliothèque nationale de France, Paris	BN f.f. 795	
	Z	Occitania, 13th century	Bibliothèque nationale de France, Paris	BN f.f. 1745	
	a		Biblioteca Riccardiana, Florence	2814	Copy of a lost manuscript compiled by Bernart Amoros.
	a^{1}		Biblioteca Estense, Modena	Gamma.N.8.4.11–13 = Càmpori Appendice 426, 427, 494	Copy of a lost manuscript compiled by Bernart Amoros.
	b		Biblioteca Vaticana, Rome	Barberiniani 4087	Copy of a lost manuscript compiled by Miquel de la Tor.
	c		Biblioteca Laurenziana, Florence	Plut. XC inferiore 26	
	d		Staatsbibliothek, Berlin	Phillipps 1910	Pillet-Carstens N^{2}, since Pillet-Carstens d is a mere copy of K.
	e		Biblioteca Vaticana, Rome	Latin 7182	
	e (Pillet-Carstens)		Biblioteca Vaticana, Rome	Barberiniani 3965	Copy of a lost manuscript compiled by Miquel de la Tor.
	f		Bibliothèque nationale de France, Paris	BN f.f. 12472	

== See also ==
- Ashik
- Bard
- Bhāts
- Baul
- Dziady (wandering beggars)
- Filí
- Griot
- Gusans
- Lirnyk
- Minstrels
- Rhapsode
- Skald
- Trouvère
