= Canso (song) =

Song style

The canso or canson or canzo (Old Occitan: [kanˈsu]) was a song style used by the troubadours. It was, by far, the most common genre used, especially by early troubadours, and only in the second half of the 13th century was its dominance challenged by a growing number of poets writing coblas esparsas.

The canso became, in Old French, the grand chant and, in Italian, the canzone.

== Structure ==
A canso usually consists of three parts. The first stanza is the exordium, where the composer explains his purpose. The main body of the song occurs in the following stanzas, and usually draw out a variety of relationships with the exordium; formally, aside from the envoi(s), which are not always present, a canso is made of stanzas all having the same sequence of verses, in the sense that each verse has the same number of metrical syllables. This makes it possible to use the same melody for every stanza. The sequence can be extremely simple, as in Can vei la lauzeta mover, whose stanzas consist of eight lines of eight metrical syllables each, or rather complex, as in Arnaut Daniel's "L'aur'amara", whose first stanza is:

L'aur amara
fa'ls bruels brancutz
clarzir,
que'l dous'espeis'ab fuelhs,
e'ls letz
becx
dels auzels ramencx
te babs e mutz,
pars
e non pars,
per que m'esfortz
per far e dir
plazers
a manhs per lei
qui m'a virat bas d'aut,
don tem morir
si l'afans no m'asoma.

(The syllable count here is 4, 4, 2, 6, 2, 1, 5, 4, 1, 3, 4, 4, 2, 4, 6, 4, 7 respectively. The same structure is kept through the six full stanzas of the piece.)

=== Rhyme scheme ===
Each stanza in a canso has the same "internal" rhyme scheme; that is, if, say, the first line rhymes with the third in the first stanza, it will do so in every successive one. What varies is the relationship between rhymes in separate stanzas.

When stanzas follow the same rhyming pattern but the actual sounds differ, they are called coblas alternadas (lit. "alternated stanzas"). When the last rhyme sound of one cobla becomes the first of the next they are called coblas capcaudadas (lit. "head-tailed"). When the last rhyme word of one stanza appears in the first line of the next they are called coblas capfinidas (lit. "head-finished"). When the rhyming scheme and rhyming sounds are the same each stanza, they are coblas unissonans (lit. "unison"). When the rhyming scheme never changes but the sounds of each stanza are different they are coblas singulars (lit. "singular"). When the rhyming scheme never changes but the sounds do every two stanzas it is called coblas doblas (lit. "double"). When the rhyming scheme never changes but the sounds do every three stanzas it is called coblas ternas. When the rhymes change position in accordance with an algorithm they are called coblas retrogradadas (lit. "retrograded").

=== Envois ===
The canso usually ends with one or more envois (called Tornadas in Old Occitan). It takes the form of a shortened stanza, containing only a last part of the standard stanza used up to that point; a clear example is the same work by Arnaut Daniel quoted above: the (single) envoi is:

Fez es l'acrotz:
qu'el cor remir
totz sers
lieis cui dompnei,
ses parsonier Arnaut,
qu'en autr'albir
n'esfort m'entent'a soma.

whose syllable count (4, 4, 2, 4, 6, 4, 7) is the same as the last seven lines of the full stanzas.

== Notable examples ==
- Guilhen de Peiteu: Pos vezem de novel florir, possibly the earliest "classic" canso
- Bertran de Born: Domna, puois de mi noˑus cal was popularized by Ezra Pound
- Bernart de Ventadorn: Can vei la lauzeta mover is probably the most famous canso ever written
- Raimbaut of Orange: Ar resplan la flors enversa, possibly the clearest example of trobar ric

== See also ==
- Song of the Albigensian Crusade, also named Canso
- Sirventes, a parody of the form
