= List of Catalan-language poets =

This is a list of poets and writers writing in the Catalan language.

== Medieval poets ==
- Anselm Turmeda
- Arnau March
- Ausiàs March
- Bernat Metge
- Gabriel Móger
- Gilabert de Próixita
- Guerau de Maçanet
- Jacme Rovira
- Jacme Scrivà
- Jaume March II
- Jaume Safont
- Joan Basset
- Joan Roís de Corella
- Jordi de Sant Jordi
- Lluís d'Averçó
- Lluís Icart
- Lorenç Mallol
- Melchior de Gualbes
- Pau de Bellviure
- Pere d'Abella
- Pere March
- Pere Miquel Carbonell
- Pere de Queralt
- Pere Tresfort
- Ramon Llull

== Early Modern Poets ==
- Francesc Fontanella
- Francesc Vicenç Garcia
- Josep Romaguera
- Juan Ramis

== Romantic and Early Modernist ("Modernistes") poets ==
- Jaume Agelat i Garrega
- Joan Alcover
- Miquel Costa i Llobera
- Bonaventura Carles Aribau
- Víctor Balaguer
- Joaquín Bartrina
- Manuel Milà i Fontanals
- Àngel Guimerà
- Joan Maragall
- Alexandre de Riquer
- Jacint Verdaguer

== Modernist and contemporary poets ==
- Anna Aguilar-Amat (b. 1962)
- Joaquim Amat-Piniella
- Maria Gràcia Bassa i Rocas (1883-1961)
- Joan Brossa (1919–1998)
- Josep Carner (1884–1970)
- Salvador Dalí
- Anna Dodas i Noguer (1962—1986)
- Xenia Dyakonova
- Najat El Hachmi
- Salvador Espriu
- Ester Fenoll Garcia
- Feliu Formosa
- Tomàs Garcés
- Pere Gimferrer
- Quima Jaume i Carbó (1934–1993)
- Joan Margarit i Consarnau
- Maria Mercè Marçal (1952-1998)
- Miquel Martí i Pol
- Salvador Oliva i Llinàs
- Josep Palau i Fabre
- Josep Pedrals i Urdàniz
- Baltasar Porcel
- Carles Riba
- Carme Riera
- Bartomeu Rosselló-Pòrcel
- Josep Maria de Sagarra (1894–1961)
- Joan Salvat-Papasseit
- Francesca Torrent
- Màrius Torres
- Joan Valls I Jordà
- Jordi Valls i Pozo
- Joan Vinyoli
- Olga Xirinacs Díaz
