= Cançoner Vega-Aguiló =

The Cançoner Vega-Aguiló (Catalan: [kənsuˈne ˈβeɣə əɣiˈlo], Occitan: [kansuˈne ˈβeɣɔ aɣiˈlu]) is a chansonnier predominantly carrying Catalan and Occitan pieces, but also some Castilian and Middle French verse.

== List of poets with pieces in the Vega-Aguiló ==
- Uguet del Vallat
- Gilabert de Próixida
- Pere March
- Andreu Febrer
- Melcior de Gualbes
- Lluís Icart
- Rajadell
- Arnau March
- Jordi de Sant Jordi
- Joan Basset
- Gabriel Ferrús
- Guerau de Massanet
- Jaume Bonet
- Joan d'Olivella
- A. de Montanyans
- Francesc de la Via
- Narcís de Sant Dionís
- Jacme Escrivà
- Joan Sesavasses
- Pardo
- Ivany
- Peires de Rius
- Guillem de Cabestany
- Peire Cardenal
- Raymond Berengar V of Provence
- Cadenet
- Arnaut de Maruelh
- Blacasset
- Folquet de Marselha
- Uc de Sant Circ
- Peire Vidal
- Peire Català
- Bernart de Ventadorn
- Jutge d'Aurena
- Arnaut Daniel
- Guilhem de Sant Leidier
- Peter II of Aragon
- Queen of Majorca
- Rigaut de Berbezilh
- Pistoleta
- Ponç d'Ortafà
- Raimbaut de Vaqueiras
- Cappellà de Bolquera
- Guillem de Montanhagol
- Cerverí de Girona
- Joan Ramon Ferrer
- Bernat de Palaol
- Aimeric de Peguilhan
- Joseta
- Pere Tresfort
- Bernat Metge
- Vicenç Comes
- Guillem de Torroella
- Guillaume de Machaut
- Oton III de Grandson
- Jean de Garencières
- Raimon de Cornet
- Lesparre
- Figueres

== Bibliography ==
- Anna Alberni Jordà (2003), "El cançoner Vega-Aguiló (BC, mss. 7 i 8): estructura i contingut," PhD thesis, University of Barcelona.
- Alberni, Anna (2006). "Intavulare", Tavole di canzonieri romanzi, I. Canzonieri provenzali 11. Barcelona, Biblioteca de Catalunya VeAg (7 e 8). Modena: Mucchi Editore.
