= Lola Badia =

Spanish philologist (born 1951)

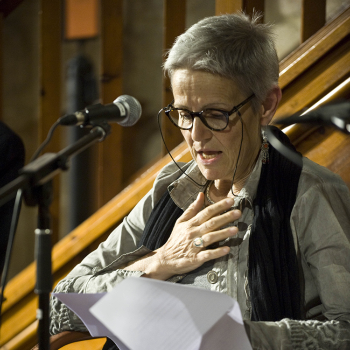
Lola Badia (2016)

Lola Badia i Pàmies (Barcelona, March 22, 1951) is a Spanish philologist, medievalist, and academic of the Reial Acadèmia de Bones Lletres de Barcelona. With her retirement in 2021, she became professor emeritus of Catalan literature at the University of Barcelona.

== Early life and education ==
Lola Badia Pàmies was born in Barcelona, Spain, on March 22, 1951. She graduated in Hispanic Philology from the Autonomous University of Barcelona in 1973, where she obtained her doctorate in 1977 under the supervision of Martí de Riquer i Morera.

== Career ==
She has been a professor of Catalan literature at the University of the Balearic Islands, the Autonomous University of Barcelona, the University of Girona, and the University of Barcelona, where she has coordinated the SLIMM (Seminar on Literature and Culture of the Middle Ages and the Modern Age) in the Department of Catalan Philology since 1987. She is responsible for the Consolidated Research Group on Medieval Catalan Literature and Culture, and directs research projects for the Ministry of Education.

Specialising in Catalan literature from the Late Middle Ages, and in particular Raimundo Lulio, she has been a visiting professor at the Autonomous University of Barcelona, the University of Girona, the Warburg Institute of the University of London, Westfield College of Queen Mary University of London , the Raimundus Lullus Institut of the University of Freiburg, and the Raimundus Lullus Institute of the University of Toronto, among other places. She has also published philological editions of Catalan classics such as Lo Somni de Bernat Metge (1999) and Curial e Güelfa (2011).

Since 1996, she has been a member of the Reial Acadèmia de Bones Lletres de Barcelona (Royal Academy of Fine Arts of Barcelona). She has also served as co-director of the Computerized Repertory of Ancient Catalan Literature (RIALC) and director of the Ramon Llull Documentation Centre of the University of Barcelona. Since 2024, she has been emeritus professor of Catalan Literature at the University of Barcelona.

== Awards and honours ==
In 2000, she received the Narcís Monturiol Medal from the Generalitat de Catalunya. In 2016, she won the Premios Nacionales de Cultura de Cataluña (National Prize for Culture of Catalonia). In 2024, she received the Serra d'Or Award.

== Selected works ==
- Poesia catalana del siglo XIV. Edició i estudi del Cançoneret de Ripoll (1983) ISBN 8485704150
- Les poesies de Jordi de Sant Jordi (1984), with Martí de Riquer ISBN 9788475021102
- De Bernat Metge a Joan Roís de Corella (1988, Premio Crítica Serra d'Or 1989) ISBN 978-84-7727-030-0
- Ramon Llull. Vida, pensament i obra literària (1988), with Anthony Bonner ISBN 8475961681
- Tradició i modernitat als segles XIV i VX. Estudis de cultura literària i lectures d'Ausiàs March (1992) ISBN 8478263993
- Pàgines pedagògiques de Ramon Llull (1992)
- Intel·lectuals i escriptors a la baixa Edat Mitjana (1994) ISBN 9788478265749
- Textos catalans tardomedievals i ciència de natures (1996) ISBN 8488762658
- La ciència en l'obra de Ramon Llull (2003) ISBN 84-370-6047-8

=== As editor ===
- Història de la literatura catalana Vol.II Literatura Medieval (II). Segles XIV-XV (2014) ISBN 9788441222960
- Història de la literatura catalana Vol.I Literatura Medieval (I). Dels orígens al segle XIV (2013) ISBN 9788441222502
