= Luys Ycart =

Catalan poet (fl. 1396–1433)

Luys Ycart (fl. 1396–1433), or Lluís Icart (Catalan pronunciation: [ʎuˈiz iˈkaɾt]) in modern orthography, was a Catalan poet. He left behind fourteen lyric poems and a long poem called Consolació i Avís d'amor ("Consolation and Advice of Love"). All of his poetry was produced before the composition of the chansonnier Vega-Aguiló (1420–30), into which it was copied soon after it was written.

== Life ==
Luys was a minor nobleman, the son of Pere Ycart and Johanna de Subirats from Lleida.

As early as 1396 he had a relationship with a woman known as Lionor de Pau. He was dubbed a knight in 1429 or 1430. He married a woman named Blanquina in an unknown year, but his four children were still young in 1433. Luys participated in the Lleidan feuds that dominated the local situation in the 1420s and 1430s. In 1430 the offenders, including Luys and his enemy Felip Claver, were fined by Queen Maria. In 1433 Maria confiscated Luys' property for his complicity in the assassination of the archdeacon of Lleida. Sometimes thereafter he adopted his mother's surname of "de Subirats", a common practice in those times.

== Work ==
Luys participated in the jocs florals of the Consistori del Gay Saber, held annually in Toulouse. One song composed by Luys for judgement in the Consistori's contests has survived, addressed appropriately to los senhors set of the gay sauber. In this poem the artificial restraints imposed by the Consistori through its Leys d'amor (laws of love, i.e. poetic composition) are evident in Luys' verse. The rhyme scheme is a simple rims capfinits. The poem is uninspired, repetitive, and forced.

The style of Luys' competitive work was atypical. Martín de Riquer describes his poetry as the pure and fluid unfolding of traditional troubadour themes with discreet ornamentation. His poetry is filled with amorous laments (planhz). His most famous love piece is probably his cobla sparça dedicated to Lionor, the daughter of the chamberlain Francesc de Pau. Lionor we know to have been in the entourage of Violant de Bar and to have accompanied the six-month-old Joana de Perpinyà (youngest child of John I of Aragon) in 1396, around which time Luys' composed his poem. Using the form of a madrigal, Luys praises "Na Pau" (Lady Peace, a play on her name) and plays on the expression donar la pau (give a kiss): Na Pau, n'he pau, "Lady Peace, have a kiss".

In several other of his love poems Luys sings to a queen, probably the widowed Margarida de Prades, who also attracted the praise of Jordi de Sant Jordi and Ausiàs March. The feudo-vassallic allegory of love pervades Luys' writings, no more so than in those dedicated to Margarida, wherein he sometimes describes the concrete realities of her court.

The piece of Luys' that most stubbornly resists comprehension is a tenso with a certain Regadelh: Frayres molt cars, meravila•m de vós. The identity of this Regadelh has never been ascertained: it could be the archdeacon Manuel de Rajadell, to whom Felip de Malla dedicated his Pecador remut, or a Bernat Fajadell (or Rajadell), beneficed at Barcelona, who was the inspiration behind a cycle of satires. The uneven tenso contains one stanza from Luys, one retort from Regadelh, and a third unassigned paragraph that certainly belongs to Luys. The debate is good-natured and designed to be entertaining, but many of the references and allusions elude interpretation.

The longest of Luys' surviving works is his 523-line, hexasyllabic Consolació o Avís d'amor, which ends with a summary stanza in decasyllables. The purpose of the work is as consolation (consolació) and counsel (avís) to a friend suffering from a disease of love. It is a lletovari (electuarium). Unlike similar Catalan works of the same era, such as Johan Basset's Letovari and Bernat Metge's Medicina, Luys' Consolació is heavy and serious in tone. The philosophy espoused is completely that of courtly love, and of Ovid, though whether consciously is doubtful.
