= Melchior de Gualbes =

Catalan knight, politician, and poet (fl. 15th century)

Melchior de Gualbes (also spelled Melcior) was a Catalan knight, politician, and author of three short poems. His poetry is preserved in the Cançoner Vega-Aguiló, in a section badly damaged by humidity. Only the use of ultraviolet radiation has made possible full readings of all his pieces.

The Gualbes family of bankers played an active role in the local government of Barcelona during the interregnum between 1410 and 1412. They supported Ferdinand of Antequera and were richly rewarded on his accession. Bernat de Gualbes sat on the council which decided the Compromise of Caspe and Melchior was the messenger who, in a rapid journey of seven hours, brought the news of the Compromise to the Parliament convened at Tortosa. In 1413 Ferdinand rewarded Melchior for his service with the castellany of Castellví de Rosanes and the procuratorship of Martorell. That same year Alfonso the Magnanimous, Aragonese infante, appointed Melchior commissioner of the regions Girona and Roussillon.

Melchior was of the same generation as the poets Jordi de Sant Jordi, Andreu Febrer, and Gilabert de Próixita. In his poetry, love was de-sensualised and idealised. The phrase cor gentil ("gentle heart"), a favourite of the stilnovisti, appears in his poem Molt m'es plasens, belha, com senyorega. This phrase was ignored by the Occitan troubadours and in this way Melchior appears more influenced by the Italians. Other phrases borrowed from Petrarch and Dante Alighieri have been found in Melchior's poetry. His metre and diction are nonetheless influenced by the troubadour lyric. His other poems are Acompanyat d'un amoros desir and Pus me suy mes en l'amorosa questa.
