= Guillem de Masdovelles =

Guillem de Masdovelles (Catalan pronunciation: [ɡiˈʎɛm də məzðuˈβeʎəs]; fl. 1389–1438) was a Catalan soldier, courtier, politician, and poet. His family came from the Penedès, but he was active in Barcelona, where he became a civic leader. His fifteen poems are preserved alongside the work of his nephew, Joan Berenguer, in a chansonnier compiled by Joan around 1470, the Cançoner dels Masdovelles. Guillem exchanged some poetry with his nephew, who also translated some of Guillem's Occitan pieces into the Catalan language. Guillem also participated in at least three public poetry contests.

Introduction to one of Guillem's sirventes, telling how he served in the Armagnac war

== Military career and sirventes ==
Guillem is first attested in 1389, when he wrote a sirventesch during the guerra dels armanyaguesos, war against the Armagnacs. He dedicated the piece to Ramon d'Abella, commander of the cavalry company with which he was fighting at the time. Late in 1389 the count of Armagnac, John III, invaded northern Catalonia from across the Pyrenees in an attempt to seize the Kingdom of Majorca, which he claimed. Guillem wrote his sirventes before actual fighting had begun. His company was active in the area around Torroella de Montgrí and Palafrugell. John III's second son, Bernard VII, already Count of Charolais, de Xerolès lo comte in Guillem's words, led a regiment of Armagnac knights into Catalonia, and it is rumours of these that Guillem is writing of in his first stanza. Guillem puts word into the mouth of the bellicose count of Charolais in an attempt to stir up his own Catalans' martial fervour.

After the war against Armagnac, Guillem entered the service of Martin, Duke of Montblanc, who had campaigned against Armagnac and was now fighting in Sicily on behalf of his son, Martin I of Sicily, against whom there was an uprising. Guillem was in Sicily early in 1394, when Martin the elder charged him with composing a sirventes while they, the Martins, were besieging Catania. The date of this poem was thought to be 1393, when the two Martins were besieged in Catania, but the language of the poem makes clear that they were the besiegers. The sirventes was designed as propaganda to recruit more troops in Catalonia. The result was probably the expedition led by Roger de Montcada, and including Pere Maça, later in 1394 and not, as one supposed, the expedition of October 1393 by Bernat de Cabrera or that of December under John I of Aragon. The sirventes, ferocious and sanguine, which dreams of exterminating the rebellious Sicilians, is written, according to its author, en la guaya siença, in the "gay science" espoused by the Consistori.

Guillem de Masdovelles is documented as a participant in the war between Ferdinand I and James II of Urgell in 1413 on the side of Ferdinand. Thereafter he resided in Barcelona, where he held several public offices. He frequently spent time in Vilafranca del Penedès.

== Love life: maldits and comiat ==
Guillem adapted the genre of the comiat, typically a song for "dismissing" a mistress, and set it to the purpose of separating himself from the service of Guerau de Cervelló, whom he describes as governador de moltes gens e pobles (meaning governor of Catalonia). Though he has performed many tasks for the aging governor, Guillem lists several wrongs that Guerau has done to his family. Many of these are impossible to understand precisely, though they would present an interesting historical commentary if they could be. It appears that Guillem was with Guerau in Sicily when the latter came to the aid of Castrogiovanni during the siege of Catania. Guerau died in 1405.

Guillem was also the author of three maldits, songs "cursing" women who made life miserable. Each was directed against a different woman in Guillem's case: an anonymous lady, a lady known by the senhal (code name) "Na Mondina" (Worldly Lady), and another known by the senhal "N'Anguaneyritz" (Lady Liar). In the first instance, the lady's love costs five cents florin and her letters are full of lies. In the second instance, the lady has another lover, so Guillem publicly airs all her secrets she has told him. This is very uncourtly, but it is justified, to Guillem, because she is devoid of all courtliness to begin with. The third poem is a maldit-comiat in which Guillem renounces his lover, who is, of course, an ugly liar. Guillem's maldits influenced the maldits of Jordi de Sant Jordi.

== Poetic contests ==
Guillem de Masdovelles participated in floral games at both the Consistori de Tolosa (Toulouse) and the Consistori de Barcelona (Barcelona). He won a prize for a canso at the first and was coronada (crowned) at the latter. Both are difficult to date but were probably works of his youth.

The song Eras mi ponch Amors tan finamen, written for Toulouse, deals primarily with the topic of secret love, always from the traditional perspective of the troubadours, as the Consistori's Leys d'amors dictated. The song Pus li prat son de verdura guarnit, given at Barcelona, was written in a fast style because it was Lent (jatz que siam en los jorns caresmals). Guillem also wrote Le temps presens de guaya primavera for the Consistori of Barcelona but won no prize for it.

At the age of seventy Guillem participated in a third competition, the last recorded event in his life. This was a private contest held in June 1438 in the parish of Sant Just in Barcelona by Bartomeu Castelló, a notary public. A prize was to be awarded to the best planh (mourning) of love. In Guillem's poem, Del cruzel crim de lleza magestat ("On the cruel crime of lèse majesté"), he makes reference to the Old French romance Le livre de Meliadus et de Guiron le Courtois et de Palamedes through micer Llach e Palamides (King Lac, father of Erec, and Palomides). He makes further reference to Llançalot and Tristany. This tactic of referring to famous lovers in literature to sustain his point he also used in a debate with his nephew.

== Debates with nephew ==
Six tensos (poetic debates) between Guillem and his nephew, Joan Berenguer, have been preserved. Based on internal evidence, they can be dated to the final phase of Guillem's writing career and towards the end of his life. The most interesting of such poems is probably his Pus qu'iey suy vielhs, en favor de les velles or "Because I am old, in favour of old ladies", in which Guillem and his nephew argued over whether older or younger women were to be preferred. Ironically, in another poem, Dues gentils donzellas say que•z an, Guillem defends his love for a girl of twenty-two, while Joan Berenguer expresses a preference for twelve-year-olds. In Mos cars nebotz: en vostres cançons vey Guillem argues that in the past poets loved more strongly and cites as his evidence Tristan (Tristanyn) and Jaufre Rudel (Jaufrés de Blaya), both of whom died of love.
