= Summa Theologica (Eiximenis) =

Theological work by Francesc Eiximenis

Summa Theologica is a theological work written by Francesc Eiximenis in Latin possibly at the beginning of the 15th century. It belongs to the genre of the summae, that represented the highest point of the medieval theological thought.

== Discovery ==
Only some parts have been preserved. They were found in the archive of the cathedral of Valencia by the Valencian Franciscan León Amorós. He also transcribed them and published them in the review Archivum Franciscanum Historicum in 1959.

== Content of the preserved part ==
The most important part deals with predestination. Eiximenis' aim was to write about it in the Fourth Book of the Christian (this book was projected but not written). The other matters of the preserved parts are the following:

- Quid est suppositum (What supposition is).
- Quid est persona (What person is).
- Quid est persona secundum Ricardum (What person is according to Richard (Richard of Saint Victor).
- Quid demonstratio propter quid (What demonstration is according to the cause).
- Quid demonstratio quia (What demonstration is why).
- Quomodo Deus sit intelligibilis (How God is comprehensible).
- De lumine (About the light).
- De prescientia Dei (About God's prescience).

== Date ==
León Amorós arrives to the conclusion that this Summa was written at the same time as the Vida de Jesucrist (Jesus Christ's life), owing to the constant references that in this work are made to the Summa, and because the references to the Summa only appear in the Vida de Jesucrist, and not in any other of Eiximenis' work. And the Vida de Jesucrist was concluded by Eiximenis at the beginning of the 15th century.

== Content and hypothetical structure ==
Considering the references that are made in the Vida de Jesucrist, L. Amorós deduces this hypothetical content and structure:

- The first book would deal with the Four Evangelists.
- The second book would deal with predestination.
- The third book is not mentioned anywhere.
- The fourth book is mentioned thrice. The first one deals with Christ's circumcision. Another one speaks about the influence of stars in men. And another one is about angels. Eiximenis had already dealt with angels in his Llibre dels àngels (Book of angels).
- The fifth book would deal with the Immaculate Conception.
- The sixth book would deal with the Gospel.
- The seventh book is mentioned regarding the matter of Christ's circumcision again.

There is another reference, but without specifying the book, to the sacrament of baptism. And finally chapter 53 of the 7th treatise of the Vida de Jesucrist refers to the Summa Theologica, but without specifying a concrete book regarding the matter of usury (Valencia. BUV. Ms. 209, f. 200r).

According to these data L. Amorós deduces that this summa would consist in seven books.

== Digital editions ==
- Edition in the NARPAN Electronic Library.
- The Summa Theologica inside Eiximenis' complete works (in Catalan and Latin).
