= Joan Toralles =

Catalan author

Joan Toralles was a Catalan author from Vic of a brief historical tract, the Noticiari ("Notices"). It is little more than a list of names, dates, places, and events, probably compiled largely from memory, covering the years from 1365 to 1427. The gossipy nature of the tract leads Martí de Riquer i Morera to label Toralles as a representative of the vox populi of the early fifteenth century in Catalonia. Despite the tract's brevity, Toralles displays a wide knowledge of current events, shrewdness, and capacity for concision. That Toralles hailed from Vic is corroborated by his deep knowledge of the geography of Osona. It is possible that his Noticiar was composed by more than one person, judging by the long period of time it covers. He covers the earthquake that stuck Olot on 15 May 1427 like this:

En lo dit any [1427] a 15 de maig feu gran terratrèmol que enderrocà en dit Bisbat [Girona], Olot, Castellfollit, Ridaura, Sta. Pau, lo Mellol, e altres cases honrades, e tots els masos de Bas, hoc encare, que mudà un bosch de verns que era rost en un bon tret de metres, é així mudat visque, é és un mas, quis nomena lo mercadal de Bas, moriren dita jornada en dit lloch de Olot 15 persones, ... en los altres llochs moriren, pero no tants, com a Olot: apres la gent anatsen a jaurer per les barracas, tornaren a reparar las casas e hevitaren aquelles los demés, e seguisá Castellfollit.
