= Pere d'Artés =

Spanish nobleman

Pere d'Artés (14th-15th centuries) was a Valencian nobleman. He was lord of Alfafara, He bought the Orís family this domain on 9 December 1392, and his son inherited it, until it was sold to the King of Aragon.

He held several important positions in king John I of Aragon court: counselor, chamberlain and Chancellor of the Exchequer among others. He was also his ambassador in the matter of his wedding with Violant of Bar, in Paris. He was also Martin of Aragon's courtier, who named him executor of his will (1407).

He sponsored the arts. Francesc Eiximenis dedicated him the Llibre dels àngels (Book of Angels) (1392). He influenced Eiximenis in order to write in Catalan and not in Latin, the Vida de Jesucrist (Life of Jesus Christ) (1403?) and this book was also dedicated to him, as the prologue of the book states. Antoni Canals dedicated him the Catalan translation of the Exposicions del Pater Noster, Ave Maria i Salve (Expositions of the Lord's Prayer, Ave Maria and Salve Regina) (1406).

He took care of the construction of the Valencian Real Palace. In this place he had the Angel's Chamber. He was buried in the chapel of his family, that he himself had founded, in the Carthusian monastery of Portaceli.
