= Pons d'Ortaffa =

Pons d'Ortaffa/Ortafas or Ponç d'Ortafà (c. 1170–1246) was a Catalan nobleman and troubadour. He was the feudal lord of Ortafà, between Perpignan and Elne, in Roussillon. Only two pieces of his lyric poetry survive, both cansos on courtly love, one with a surviving melody.

Pons was born into a minor noble family with a history of producing ecclesiastics for the local church. He was the son and successor of Grimau, who was alive as late as 1184, and Brunissenda. He was born around 1170. His younger brother Pere was the archdeacon of Elne. He died in 1247 and was buried in Elne Cathedral. Pons married Saurina de Tatzó, also of Roussillon, and had three children: his successor Pons II, Grimau, and Alisenda. Pons II was alive as late as 1251.

Pons' name appears on a peace treaty between the lords of Roussillon and their count, Nuño Sánchez, in 1217. The last documentary record of Pons is his testament, dated 23 July 1240. A second draft was produced in 1246. He probably died soon thereafter.

Pons first poems is Enaissi cum la naus en mar ("Thus like the ship on the sea"), dedicated to a Senher En Berenguier ("Lord Sir Berengar", possibly Berenguier de Palazol, with whom Pons may have had contact early in his life). The lady of the song was from the Narbonnais, a region in which Pons' father possessed land according to a document of 13 November 1171 now in the Liber Feudorum Maior: de meridie in campo Caput Stagni de Burliano . . . in termino de Ortafano. It is possible that Pons was travelling in the Narbonnais when he wrote the song, perhaps on family business. In this same song Pons contemplates entering the Cistercian monastery of Jau. The surviving melody of this poem is extremely simple and "frugal" in style.

Pons second poem is Si ai perdut mon saber. It is full of original ideas and some chansonniers assign it to Raimbaut de Vaqueiras or Pons de Capduelh, but the mention of Jau fixes its author as Pons d'Ortaffa, whose lordship was adjacent to Jau. Pons' verses garnered him prestige in Catalonia. The first verse of Si ai perdut appeared in the Passio Amoris of Jordi de Sant Jordi and in Tant mon voler by Pere Torroella.

== Sources ==
- Aubrey, Elizabeth. The Music of the Troubadours. Indiana University Press, 1996. ISBN 0-253-21389-4.
- Riquer, Martín de. Los trovadores: historia literaria y textos. 3 vol. Barcelona: Planeta, 1975.
