= Escrivá =

Escrivá may refer to the following individuals:

- Francesc de Paula Burguera i Escrivà
- Jaume Escrivà
- Jofré Llançol i Escrivà
- José Finat y Escrivá de Romaní
- José Luis Escrivá
- Josemaría Escrivá
- Vicente Escrivá
