= Berenguier de Palazol =

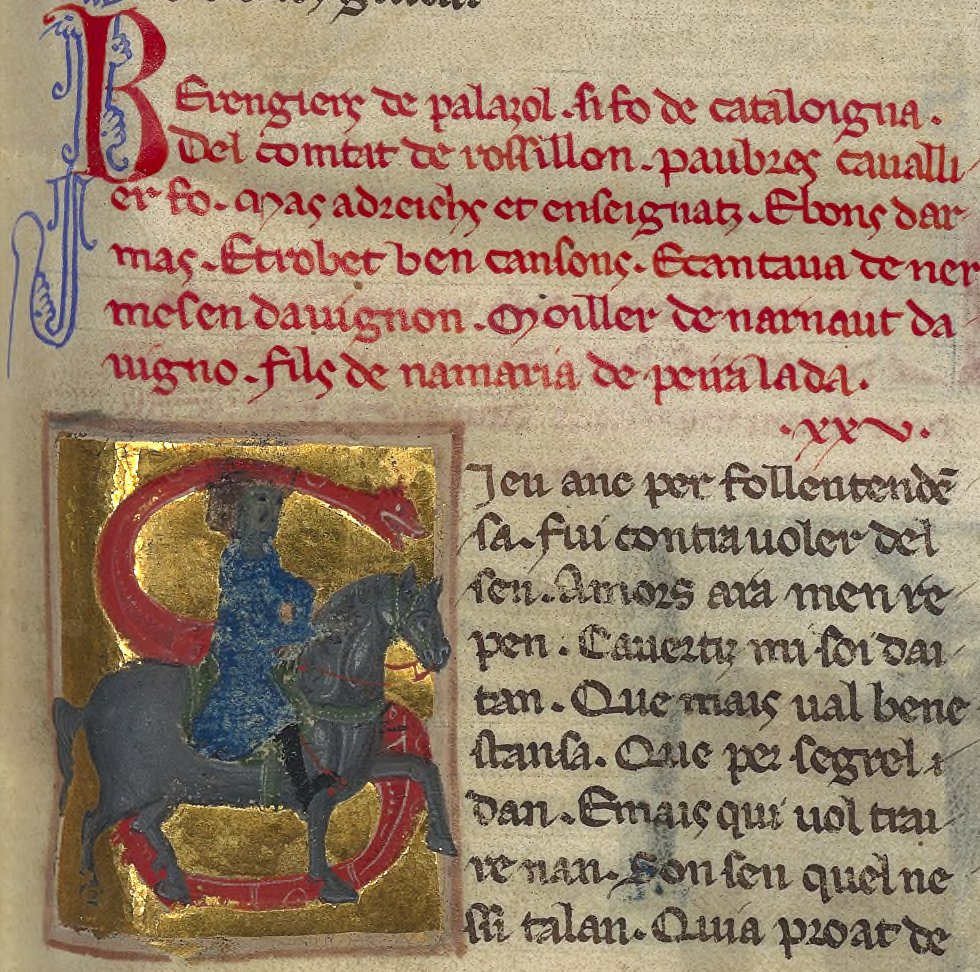
Berengiers de palazol si fo de cataloigna, del comtat de rossillon, paubres cavallier fo. . . "Berenguier de Palazol was from Catalonia, from the county of Roussillon, a poor knight he was. . ."

Berenguier de Palazol, Palol, or Palou (fl. 1160–1209) was a Catalan troubadour from Palol in the County of Roussillon. Of his total output twelve cansos survive, and a relatively high proportion—eight—with melodies.

Only some sketchy details of Berenguier's life can be gleaned from surviving records. According to his vida he was a poor knight, but well-trained and skilled in arms. Other evidence suggests that his family was well-off. He appears in five documents of Roussillon between 1196 and 1209, all under the Latin name Berengarius de Palatiolo (or Palaciolo). The earliest dates of his career are determined by the fact that he was a vassal of Gausfred III of Roussillon, who died in 1164 and receives mention in several of Berenguier's works. It is quite possible that Berenguier was one of the earliest troubadours, and the poems that mention Jaufres (Gausfred) may date as early as 1150. Berenguier does not seem to have had much contact with his fellow troubadours. He may have met Pons d'Ortaffa late in life, and the latter may address him in one of his songs as Senher En Berenguier.

All of Berenguier's surviving works deal with the theme of courtly love. One of his cansos was a model for a sirventes by his contemporary Raimbaut de Vaqueiras, who may have set it to the same tune, Berenguier's most "florid". The chief object of the love of his songs is Ermessen d'Avinyo, wife of Arnaut d'Avinyo. According to Berenguier's vida, Arnaut was a son of Maria de Peiralada, but this is probably a confusion with Maria domina de Petralata, the mother of Soremonda, the lover of Guillem de Cabestany.

Berenguier's well-preserved music is generally syllabic with a few melismatic phrase endings; conservative, generally staying within an octave; and motivically structured, having something in common with that of Bernart de Ventadorn.

== Works ==
Berenguier's works cannot be chronologically ordered with any confidence, but they have been ordered in a scheme which seeks to present some "logical" development of a theme. The theme which runs through these works cannot be connected to events in Berenguier's life, nor can it be shown that the lady (dompna) of every song is the same person. Nonetheless, the developing of the theme corresponds to stages in the life of a lover.

- Aital dona cum ieu sai

In this work Berenguier praises the perfection of his lady. She is proud and has many suitors. She does, however, lend him ear.

- Dona, si totz temps vivia

Berenguier pledges to seek no other lover, even though his lady seems out of reach.

- Dona, la genser qu'om veya

Berenguier resolves to be patient.

- Aissi quon hom que senhor ochaizona

Berenguier is at the lady's mercy, yet she is not faithful to him as he is to her.

- S'eu anc per fola entendensa

Berenguier wishes his lady would spare him this torment.

- S'ieu sabi' aver guiardo

Berenguier has failed, but he expresses hope that this song may yet get her attention.

- Tant m'abelis joys et amors e chans

Finally Berenguier is rewarded for his persistence by his lady's attention. In her absence she gives him strength and in the cold warmth; she encourages his singing.

- Mais ai de talan que no suelh

Berenguier is joyful. He only wishes he could see his lady every moment.

- Bona dona, cuy ricx pretz fai valer

The lady withdraws from Berenguier. He should leave her, but he could not endure it, nor find any woman better.

- De la gensor qu'om vey', al mieu semblan

The dilemma: remain faithful or leave.

- Totz temoros e doptans

Berenguier blames himself for his loss, yet renews his pledge to his lady.

- Ab la fresca clardat

Summertime incites this song and Berenguier determines to seek his lady's favour again.

== Sources ==
- Aubrey, Elizabeth. The Music of the Troubadours. Indiana University Press, 1996. ISBN 0-253-21389-4.
- Costa, Ricardo da; Gaby, André; Hartmann, Ernesto; Ribeiro, Antonio Celso; Silva, Matheus Corassa da. "Um tributo à arte de ouvir. O amor cortês nas cançons de Berenguer de Palou (c. 1160-1209)". eHumanista/IVITRA 15 (2019), p. 396-455. ISSN 1540-5877.
- Egan, Margarita, ed. and trans. The Vidas of the Troubadours. New York: Garland, 1984. ISBN 0-8240-9437-9.
- Newcombe, Terence. "The Troubadour Berenger de Palazol: A Critical Edition of His Poems." Nottingham Mediaeval Studies, 15 (1971), pp. 54–96.
- Riquer, Martín de. Los trovadores: historia literaria y textos. 3 vol. Barcelona: Planeta, 1975.
