= Massanet =

Massanet may refer to:

- Damián Massanet, Spanish Franciscan priest
- Guerau de Massanet, Catalan nobleman and poet
- Maria Baldó i Massanet (1884-1964), Spanish teacher, feminist, folklorist, and liberal politician

== See also ==
- Massenet
