= Peyre de Rius =

Peyre de Rius (fl.1344–86) was an Occitan troubadour from Foix. He wrote under the patronage of Gaston Phoebus, Count of Foix, and Peter the Ceremonious, King of Aragon. He is one of the few troubadours known by name who lived for a time at Peter's court in Barcelona. His name in standardised Occitan is Peire or Pèire, in Catalan it is Pere, and in modern French Pierre.

An obscure reference to a Pere Riu among some jongleurs from Puigcerdà near Foix in October 1344 may be to Peyre, but it is impossible to tell. The Pedro who was a jongleur of the count of Foix, mentioned in an Aragonese register of June 1357, may be Peyre de Rius. So may be Pere Ruiç (perhaps an error for Riuç), minstrel of the count of Foix, of July 1368. Peyre appears frequently in the court registers of Aragon for the years between 1361 and 1381, often changing his precise occupation and his patron. His first recorded appearance at the Aragonese court was 16 September 1361, when he was paid as a minstrel in the service of Gaston Phoebus. The first reference to him as a troubadour is in a document of 19 January 1372, when the court was at Alcañiz; he was again in the service of the count of Foix. In February 1373 he and Jacme Fluvia, both titled trobador de danses (or dançes, "composers of dansas"), received gifts from the queen, Eleanor of Sicily. By 11 May 1373 he was again in the household of the king himself, and as a minstrel. On 25 June 1380 he was in the service of Foix and a troubadour. In his last appearance in documents, he is recorded as receiving gifts from the new queen, Sibil·la de Fortià, for service as a trobador de cançons de casa del comte de Foix (troubadour of cansos of the House of Foix).

Of Peyre's work only one canso survives, in the Cançoner Vega-Aguiló compiled in the 1420s. Martín de Riquer, who gave the piece its first modern edition, could not identify Peyre's dialect nor his place of origin on the basis of his language. The poem is dedicated to Gaston Phoebus and is an extended gloss on the three things which delight the count, according to the prologue of Gaston's Livre de la chass: "tout mon temps me suis délité par espécial en trois chose: l'une est en armes, l'autre est en amours, et l'autre si est en chasse." Peyre opens the work thus:

| Armas, amors e cassa me play quant se'n amassa el coms, qui les manté . . . | Arms, amours, and hunting please me when the gather in the Count, who maintains them . . . |

The count is named explicitly later (Febus, le coms). If the song is to be dated to the time when Peyre was consistently in or around Foix it would seem to pertain to the period 1344–57 or as late as 1373.

De Riquer has suggested that Peyre may be the Pere de Rius who was a fidèle boutiller de notre chère fille l'infante Jeanne (faithful butler of our dear daughter the infanta Joanna) under John I of Aragon, called The Hunter. This Joanna (Juana de Daroca), the eldest daughter of John I, married Mathieu de Castelbon (on 24 March 1392), who had succeeded his uncle Gaston as count of Foix in 1391.
