= Iványi =

Iványi is a surname. Notable people with the surname include:

- Béla Iványi-Grünwald (1867–1940), Hungarian painter, member of the Nagybánya artists' colony, founder of the Kecskemét artists' colony
- Dalma Iványi (born 1976), Hungarian basketball player
- Gyula von Iványi (1864–1920), Hungarian Olympic fencer
- István Szent-Iványi (born 1958), Hungarian politician and Member of the European Parliament for the Alliance of Free Democrats
- Iványi (river), a tributary of the Zagyva in northern Hungary

== See also ==
- Ivany
