= Pere Tresfort =

Catalan poet

Pere Tresfort was a minor Catalan Occitan poet of the early 15th century. Three of his poems are preserved in the Cançoner Vega-Aguiló and their rubrics indicate he was a notary public. "Ab fletxes d'aur untatz d'erb'amorosa" consists of one decasyllabic stanza and a tornada. This theme was later revisited at greater length by Ausiàs March. The dansa "Jovencelhs qui no à ymia" is written in praise of love. "Gran carrech han huy tuyt l'om de paratge" is his third surviving poem.

== Sources ==
- Riquer, Martín de (1964). Història de la Literatura Catalana, vol. 1. Barcelona: Edicions Ariel.
- Incipitario di Pere Tresfort at the Repertorio informatizzato dell'antica letteratura catalana (RIALC)
