= Lluís de Bellviure =

Majorcan merchant

Lluís de Bellviure (Catalan pronunciation: [ˈʎwis ðə ˌβeʎˈβiwɾə]) (d. Barcelona, January 27, 1392) was a converso Majorcan merchant of the fourteenth century. He was appointed bailiff of Majorca and castellan of the Bellver Castle by King John I of Aragon after Nuño Ruiz.

On August 2, 1391, a peasant revolt burst in the context of the anti-Jewish massacres of 1391. While several citizens were seeking refuge in the Bellver Castle, the forans (peasants) assaulted Palma. Bellviure redirected their leader, Antoni Sitjar "Brou de Pella", to the Jewish quarter, where around 300 Jews were killed. It is not clear whether he directed a unique attack, or, in a turn of events, on August 17, began to recruit men to re-assault the Jewish quarter. In any case, the governor ordered his arrest. After fleeing from Sóller to Menorca on August 9, he was captured by Jofredo de Cavanal on December 8 and sent to Barcelona by boat to be trialed by the King. There he was executed, in the Llotja, after informing Queen Violant of Bar of his arrest.

He was married to Joaneta de Requesens, a conversa. It is unclear whether he was a relative of Catalan poet Pau de Bellviure.
