= Pau de Bellviure =

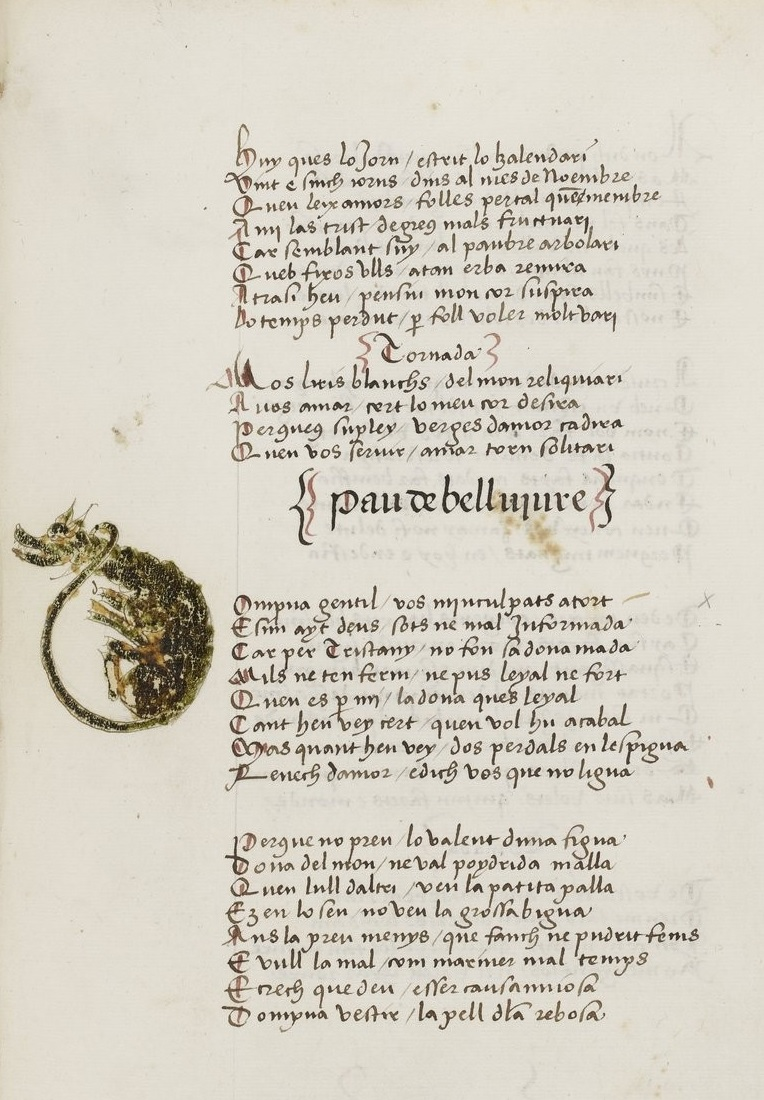
Pau's maldit in the Cançoneret d'amor

Pau de Bellviure (Catalan pronunciation: [ˈpaw ðə ˌβeʎˈβiwɾə]) was a Catalan poet of the fourteenth and/or fifteenth centuries. To the Catalan and Spanish writers of the Renaissance he was a model of courtly love who had attained gran fama (great fame). Pere Torroella lists him among the "doctors" of poetry. According to Ausiàs March, his love for his lady turned him mad and he broke his neck and died, a martyr to love.

"Pau de Bellviure" may be a surname, in which case his given name is unknown. In some manuscripts he is called Benviure, the name of a famous lineage. The castle of Benviure was later absorbed by Eramprunyà, an estate of the March family. In his Prohemio a carta, the Marqués de Santillana begins survey of the history of Catalan verse with Guilhem de Berguedan and "Pao de Benbibre". There is mention of a Paül, son of Pere de Benviure, secretary to John I of Aragon, who died in 1417. According to Guerau de Maçanet, Pau was a member of the noble Rocabertí or Cabrera families. It is unclear whether he was a relative of Majorcan merchant Lluís de Bellviure.

Only one complete poem, Dompna gentil, vos m'enculpats a tort, survives despite Pau's subsequent fame. It is a discreet maldit in which he attacks his lady for her infidelity. A fragment, Per fembre fo Salamo enganat, of a lost poem by Pau is preserved in the Conhort of Francesc Ferrer. In this fragment Pau lists the names of famous men who were the victims of woman's lies: Solomon, David, Samson, Adam, Aristotle, Virgil, John the Baptist, and Hippocrates. In both his extant pieces, Pau comes across as misogynistic, but his light-hearted treatment of the subject and his use of irony assured his popularity. It is unknown whether he really died of love or it is a legend that merely arose from his reference to la mort qui.m corre (death that chases me) in Dompna gentil.
