= Felip de Malla =

17th President of the Deputation of the General of Catalonia
- In office 1425–1428
- Preceded by: Dalmau de Cartellà i Despou
- Succeeded by: Domingo Ram y Lanaja

Personal details
- Born: Barcelona, Principality of Catalonia
- Died: 12 July 1431 Barcelona, Principality of Catalonia

Felip de Malla (Catalan pronunciation: [fəˈlib də ˈmaʎə]; 1370 – 12 July 1431) was a Catalan prelate, theologian, scholastic, orator, classical scholar, and poet. He was a confidant of the kings Martin the Humane, Ferdinand of Antequera, and Alfonso the Magnanimous. He was the seventeenth President of the Generalitat de Catalunya from 1425 to 1428.

Born in Barcelona and educated in literature and philosophy at the University of Lleida, Felip eventually earned a master's of theology from the University of Paris. He later took holy orders. Renowned for his oratory and his classical prose, among the ancients which he can be shown to have read are Pindar, Alcaeus, Horace, Catullus, and Serenus Sammonicus. A high percentage of his own manuscripts survive. Between 1419 and 1424 he penned his most important work, Memorial del peccador reemut, an ascetic treatise on Christianity, Judaism, and paganism. This manuscript now resides in the Biblioteca de Catalunya (MS. 465). Two incunabula of the Memorial del peccador reemut exist: the first was published in 1483 and the second in 1495 by Joan Rosenbach at the Abbey of Montserrat.

In 1408 Felip was appointed conseller e promotor dels negocis de la cort ("counsellor and business promoter of the court") by Martin. He maintained this position under Ferdinand and Alfonso. Felip participated in the negotiations leading up to the Compromise of Caspe, putting his support decisively behind Ferdinand of Antequera and exerting effective influence on his part. Felip also played a role in the resolution of the Western Schism through his work at the Council of Constance and his efforts against the following of Benedict XIII, his former patron. In the election to choose a pope, Felip received six votes at Constance.

In February 1413, the Consistori de Barcelona held a poetry competition at the Palau Reial Major. Both the opening speech (presuposición) and the closing one were given by Felip de Malla, one of the maintainers (mantenidors) of the Consistori. Both speeches were transcribed (and presumably delivered) in a Catalan liberally seasoned with classical and ecclesiastical Latin, as befitted Felip's education and reputation. Not surprisingly from a master of theology, it is intensely religious:

Per tal com Déus és rei de tot la terra, monarca, príncep, preceptor, provisor, administrador e triunfador universal, vostres metres, ¡oh trobadors estudiosos!, vostres gais e retòrics dictats, sien limats, brunits, cementats, soldats e ormejats ab dolç estil, mesura e compàs de sancta saviesa . . .	For as God is king of all the earth, monarch, prince, preceptor, provider, administrator and universal conqueror, our poems, o studious troubadours, our gay and rhetorical words, are being filed, burnished, cemented, brazed and outfitted by the sweet style, measuring rod, and compass of the holy wisdom . . .

In light of the fact that Ferdinand was involved in a war with James II, Count of Urgell, Felip, whose duty it is as maintainer to give the contestants a theme, asked for short, sharp verses about war, namely, a sirventes.

In 1423 Felip was the dean of the diocese of Huesca and then almoner of Elne. In 1424 he was elevated to the position of archdeacon of the see of Barcelona, which post he held until his death. In 1425 he was made president of the Generalitat. In that capacity he had to fight the distance between the king and the nobility, growing wider since the 1421 Catalan courts held in Barcelona. During his term Felip dealt with the introduction of Castilians into government offices, the lack of concern showed by King Alfonso for his Iberian territories, the preoccupation of the king with the conquest of Naples, and the attempt by Alfonso to create a fief for his younger brother Peter at Cervera. In 1428 the Principality of Catalonia was ravaged by the plague, and an earthquake struck on 2 February. This earthquake was one of only several that struck Catalonia (especially Roussillon) during the years 1427–28. The duty of informing the king, who was then in Valencia, fell to Felip, whose letter and description of the event survives. Felip left office later that year. He died on 12 July 1431 in Barcelona.

== Bibliography ==
- Balasch i Recort, M. (1978). "El pensament biblic de Felip de Malla". Revista Catalana de Teologia Barcelona, 3:1, pp. 99–126.
- Perarnau i Espelt, Josep (2002). "La lletra de Felip de Malla informant el rei Alfons del terratrèmol de la Candelera, 1428". Arxiu de textos catalans antics, 21:665–670. ISSN 0211-9811
- Riquer, Martí de (1964). Història de la Literatura Catalana, vol. 1. Barcelona: Edicions Ariel.
