= Lorenç Mallol =

Lorenç Mallol (Catalan: [ʎuˈɾɛnz məˈʎɔl], older spelling Lorenz; fl. 1350) was a Catalan poet of the fourteenth century, the first Petrarchan of his country and one of the last troubadours. His two surviving pieces are composed in Old Occitan. His first name is also spelled Laurenç (pronounced [lawˈɾɛns]) in modern Occitan and Llorenç (pronounced [ʎuˈɾɛns]) in modern Catalan.

Lorenç presented a certain vers figurat (figured verse), Sobre·l pus alt de tots los cims d'un arbre, to the Consistori del Gay Saber in Toulouse, a mystic allegory of Jesus Christ (Ihus lo salvaire), who is the auzel(l)et tot blanch (little all-white bird), and the Jews, who are a corps mot vils (most vile corpse). The arbre (tree) signifies la vera crotz (the true cross). The poem has two tornadas, one to Mon Ric(h) Thesaur (my rich treasure), a senhal (code name) for the Virgin Mary and another to the seven lords (senyor set) of the consistori del Gay Sauber. It is Enrich de Villena, a lord of the Consistori de Barcelona, who informs us that this was not that consistori but the one of Toulouse, since the piece was written before the foundation in Barcelona (1393). The Marian reference is very typical for the Consistori of Toulouse and this poem is usually classed as a religious sirventes. It is unknown if it won a prize at the joc florals or even when it was composed.

More useful for garnering an understanding of Catalan and Occitan literature of the period, is Lorenç' escondig (escondit), which cannot be connected to the Consistori or its competitions. Moltes de vetz, dompna, ·m suy presentatz, as it begins, describes how certain jealous men (lauzengiers) told his lady that Lorenç was bragging that she loved him, a discourteous violation of the secrecy of love. Lorenç denies the charge in a way clearly inspired by Petrarch's fifteenth canzone, which begins S'i'l dissi mai ("If I ever said that"). This line, translated into Occitan, is how the main (14 of 17) stanzas of Lorenç' 132-line poem begin: Si·u diguí may. The poet then describes the horrible fate which would await him for so treacherous a betrayal. The tornada employs the same senhal, Mon Rich Thesaur, as the religious poem, this time for an anonymous lady presumably not the Virgin. From another direction Lorenç seems influenced by Bertran de Born, who wrote the only escondig attributable to a troubadour. In Lorenç, Renaissance Petrarchism and reactionary troubadourism are combined.

Despite this, Lorenç is not avant garde. His poetry is not of especial literary quality, nor is his imitation of Petrarch the beginning of a trend. He did not borrow from Petrarch any of the latter's superior poetic innovations. Rather, he so happens to be one of the few Catalans of his time to find in Petrarch and the Italians things worth copying and fitting into their troubadouresque structures.

== Works available online ==
- Incipitario de Llorenç Mallol: includes edited texts of the original language for both of his extant poems.
