= Consistori de Barcelona =

The Consistori (de la Gaya Sciència) de Barcelona (Catalan: [kunsisˈtɔɾi ðə βəɾsəˈlonə], Occitan: [kunsisˈtɔɾi ðe βaɾseˈlunɔ]; "Academy of the Gay Science of Barcelona") was a literary academy founded in Barcelona by John the Hunter, King of Aragon and Count of Barcelona, in 1393 in imitation of the Consistori del Gay Saber founded in Toulouse in 1323. The poetry produced by and for the Consistori was heavily influenced by the troubadours. The Consistori's chief purpose was to promote "correct" styles and themes and discourage vices (vicis) by awarding prizes in competition to poets who adhered to the "rules" of poetic composition. The names of few poets laureate have come down to us and despite some excellent descriptions of the Consistori's activities, associated persons and poems are obscure.

== Prehistory and origins ==
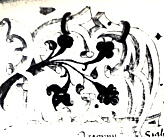
Floral decoration from a privilege of Ferdinand I given to the Consistori in 1413

At Pentecost, 31 May 1338, a contest was held at Lleida before Peter the Ceremonious, John's predecessor, at which those poems adjudged the best were given awards. A panel of judges was designated in advance by the king. It was to pass judgement super arte dictandi et faciendi pulcra carmina sive cantars: "on the art of speaking and composing beautiful songs, that is, cantars". The winning poets received a rosa d'or (golden rose) and piece of expensive golden satin called diasprell. With its floral prize, the 1338 contest emulated the jocs florals (floral games) already being held in Toulouse and to be held eventually in Barcelona as well.

Much about this event, however, remains unknown: the language of composition was vernacular (cantars), but which vernacular is uncertain (Occitan or Catalan), and the names of the poets or any portions of their work have not survived. Nonetheless, Martí de Riquer presumes that similar festivals occurred in years prior and recurred in subsequent years, though there are no records. It need not be assumed that such contests took place in the royal presence; they may have been held by the great lords.

At Valencia on 20 February 1393, John the Hunter founded an annual festival (la festa de la Gaya Sciència) to be celebrated in honour of the Virgin Mary on the day of Annunciation (15 May) or the following Sunday at Barcelona. The festival included a vernacular poetry contest, modelled after those held in Toulouse, Paris, and other illustrious cities, and the poems submitted were judged by Jaume March II and Luys d'Averçó, entitled magistros et defensores (teachers and defenders) of poetry.

The document of the king's foundation, which was written up by the scribe Bartomeu Sirvent, also mentions that the initiative for the festival had been March and Averçó's and that they had requested it of the king. The expertise of judges for the festival was also set out by the king, in Latin: gaya vel gaudiosa, et alio nomine inveniendi sciencie, that is, "gay and joyful, and by another name inventive science". The Latin terms gaya ... sciencie and inveniendi sciencie were direct translations of the vernacular terms gay sauber (gay science) and ciència de trobar (science of troubadour composition).

== Competitions ==
The first recorded contest held by the Consistori de Barcelona was held probably on 28 March 1395 with the king in attendance. He had only been in Barcelona since 25 March. This festival is known from a letter the king wrote, which he sent on 19 February 1396 recording the bella festa ... a honor de la dita gaya ciència, the prizes for which were provided by the municipal government. There is no record of the names of the winners, the prizes, or their poems. The letter of 1396 was written in Catalan by Bernat Metge on behalf of the king and sent from Perpignan to Barcelona, foretelling the king's arrival for the festival and asking the city to commit some funds to it. Jaume March brought the letter before the Consell dels Cents Jurats sometime in the middle of march, but the timing was horrible. The Consell was intriguing against the king and the city had largely rejected his control. Then the Consell dels Trenta sent an embassy to John to report on el fet de la gaya sciència, but the city's response was que les dites joies no sien donades per la Ciutat (that the aforesaid jewellery shall not be donated by the City) and that was the end of the year's floral games.

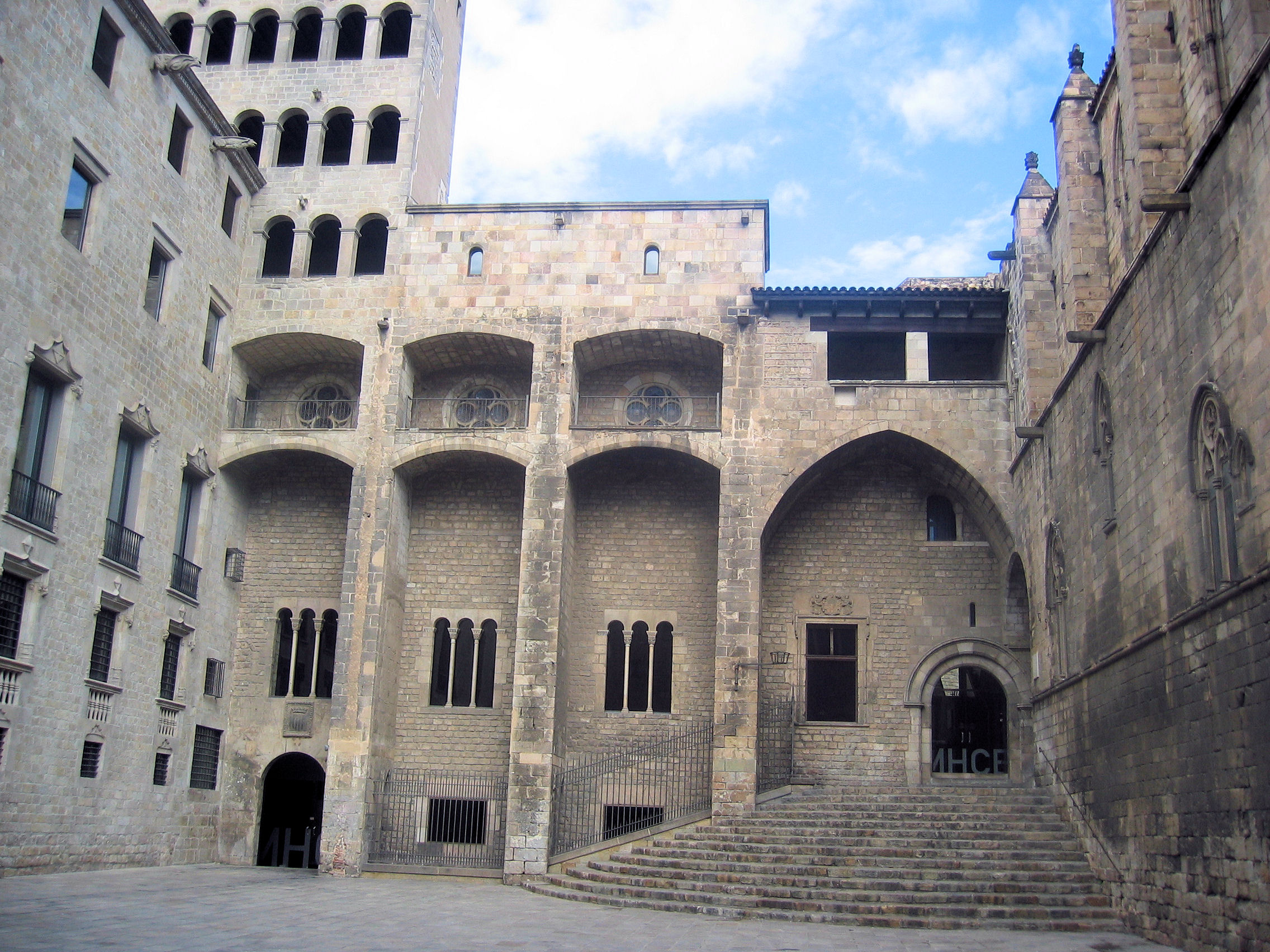
The place of competition, the square of the Palau Reial Major

John died two months later, having only held two of his planned annual festivals (1394 and 1395). The festival disappeared for two more years until 1 May 1398, when John's successor, Martin the Humane, agreed, from Zaragoza, to subsidise the Consistori's annual festival, to be held again on Pentecost, with forty Aragonese gold florins to cover the cost of the golden and silver prizes for the winners, to be chosen by mantenidors named by the king. On 12 August 1399 at Zaragoza, Martin renominated Jaume March and Luys d'Averçó as rectors, maintainers, and defenders of the Gaya Sciència de Barcelona. Martin's two acts do not refer to the previous efforts of King John and rather seem to treat the Consistori as a new royal foundation distinct from the municipally-run foundation of his predecessor. Martin's 1398 act also made mention of Toulouse and Paris (again) in a lengthy preamble outlining the merits of the various sciences: arithmetic, astrology, dialectic, geometry, law, medicine, music, politics, strategy, composing (trobar), theology, etc. Under Martin a great festa was held in 1408 beneath the walls where the Mirador del rei Martí—a recent addition the royal palace complex—and the Palau del Lloctinent meet in Barcelona.

The Consistori lapsed with Martin's death (1410) and the political confusion leading up to the Compromise of Caspe (1412) prevented its activity, but on 17 March 1413 Ferdinand of Antequera, who succeeded Martin in accord with the Compromise, confirmed to the Consistori (consistorio, collegio seu cetu inventorum) all that Martin had decreed in 1398, conceded to it the right to elect the four maintainers, and permitted it to meet at any time of the year other than the annual festival. The annual contest was confirmed to occur on 1 May, and Ferdinand became its greatest patron. His ties to Castile helped increase the accessibility of Catalan (and Occitan) culture and was a catalyst for the first Castilian poetic treatise, the Arte de trovar.

== Speeches of Felip de Malla ==
In February 1413, one month before Ferdinand's privilege, the Consistori held one of its best-recorded competitions at the Palau Reial Major. The opening speech (presuposició) of one of the maintainers (the master of theology, Felip de Malla) and the declaration of the winner have both been preserved. Both of these speeches were transcribed (and presumably delivered) in a Catalan liberally seasoned with classical and ecclesiastical Latin. Felip displays knowledge of classics, of Pindar, Alcaeus, Horace, Catullus, and Serenus Sammonicus. Not surprisingly from a master of theology, it is intensely religious:

Per tal com Déus és rei de tot la terra, monarca, príncep, preceptor, provisor, administrador e triunfador universal, vostres metres, ¡oh trobadors estudiosos!, vostres gais e retòrics dictats, sien limats, brunits, cementats, soldats e ormejats ab dolç estil, mesura e compàs de sancta saviesa . . .	For as God is king of all the earth, monarch, prince, preceptor, provider, administrator and universal conqueror, our poems, o studious troubadours, our gay and rhetorical words, are being filed, burnished, cemented, brazed and outfitted by the sweet style, measuring rod, and compass of the holy wisdom . . .

Felip's speeches are interesting and very erudite, but he shows a penchant for Scholastic digressions and tolerated only religious poetry dedicated to God or the Virgin. Felip praises Ferdinand, who was apparently present, for lending prestige to the Consistori (collegi). He then presents the theme. In light of the fact that Ferdinand is involved in a war with the James II, Count of Urgell, Felip asks for short, sharp pieces about war, namely, for a sirventes. Felip's closing speech is similar in style to his opening, being filled with Latin references and lengthy commentary, but absent is the mention of the winner's name or poem. Probably the speech was written in advance of the final judgement before a winner was known.

== Description of Enrique de Villena ==
One of the best descriptions of the Consistori de Barcelona is found in the Arte de trovar of the Castilian writer Enrique de Villena, who was at Barcelona in 1408. Though written in 1423, it probably describes the Consistori during the era of Martin the Humane as well. Enrique's account of the foundation of the Consistori, however, is a jumble of historical events that took places decades and almost centuries apart:

El consistorio de la Gaya Sciencia se formó en Francia, en la cibdad de Tolosa, por Ramón Vidal de Besaldú, esmerándose con aquellas reglas los entendidos de los grosseros. . . . Este Ramón, por ser començador, no fabló tan complidamente. Sucedióle Jofre de Foxá, monge negro, e dilató la materia, llamando a la obra que hizo Continuación de trobar. . . . Vino después d'éste de Mallorca Verenguel de Troya, e fizo un libro de figuras y colores reptóricos. . . . El rey don Joan de Aragón, primero d'este nombre, fijo del rey don Pedro segundo, fizo solepne embaxada al rey de Francia pidiéndole mandase al collegio de los trobadores que viniesen a plantar en su reyno el estudio de la gaya sciencia, e obtúvolo, e fundaron estudio d'ello en la çibdat de Barcelona dos mantenedores que vinierion de Tolosa para esto.	The consistory of the Gay Science was formed in France, in the city of Toulouse, by Raimon Vidal of Besalú, polishing with those rules the understanding of the uncouth. . . . This Raimon, by being the founder, did not discuss everything completely. He was succeeded by Jofre de Foixà, a black monk, who expanded the material, calling his work A Continuation of Inventing. . . . After came this one from Mallorca, Berenguer d'Anoia, and he made a book of rhetorical figures and devices. . . . The king don John of Aragon, first of this name, son of the king don Peter the second, made a solemn embassy to the king of France asking him to send to the college of troubadours that they might plant in his kingdom the study of the gay science, and he obtained it, and two maintainers that had come from Toulouse for this founded the study of it in the city of Barcelona.

Enrique is the sole authority for the statement that John the Hunter sent an embassy to the King of France, Charles VI, evidently before 1393, to request that he send two men from his Consistori at Toulouse to found one at Barcelona. According to Jerónimo Zurita in his Indices rerum ab Aragoniae regibus gestarum (Zaragoza: D. a Portonariis de Ursinus, 1578), in 1388 an embassy was sent to France ut vernaculae linguae celebres poëtae in Hispaniam ex Narbonensis provinciae scholis traducerentur: & studia poëtices, quam gaiam scientiam vocabant, instituerentur. His vero, quorum ingenium in eo artificio elucere videbatur, magna praemia, industriae, & honoris insignia, monumentaque laudis esse constituta ("so that the vernacular language might be celebrated in Spain, translated from the school of the province of the Narbonnaise: and poetic studies, which is called the gay science, instituted"). The story is not implausible, however, and may explain the obscure references to Paris in the acts of John and Martin. It is also plausible that two scholars left Toulouse with the purpose of founding a second academy at Barcelona, considering the history of Occitan literature in Catalonia.

According to Enrique, who is the only source for the organisational structure of the Consistori, it was run by four mantenidors: a knight, a master of theology, a master of laws, and an honourable citizen. Since all other existing documentation shows John and Martin naming two mantenidors, it follows that Ferdinand of Antequera, under whom Enrique was writing, raised it to four. At one point Enrique seems also to say that prizes (vergas de plata, silver rods) were given out each month (cada mes), but this may represent a corruption in the manuscript and should perhaps refer to each year. According to Enrique, the "collegio de Barcelona" lapsed after the death of Martin in 1410. The sixteenth-century Toledan Álvar Gómez de Castro glossed the Arte de trobar manuscript with the fact that Enrique came into the service of Ferdinand after his election to succeed Martin in 1412 that he procuró la reformación del consistorio y señaláronle por el principal d'ellos ("procured the reformation of the consistory and was marked as the principal among them"). Enrique held a post in the Consistori similar to that of a president, but it is possible that he exaggerated his own importance.

Enrique described the festas of the Gay Science as occurring in two sessions, perhaps on two separate days. At the first session, one of the mantenidors gives a lecture (called the presuposición), then the poets recited their work de la materia a ellos asignada (on the theme assigned to them). The themes were algunas vezes loores de Santa María, otras de armas, otras de amores e de buenas costumbres: sometimes the praises of the Virgin Mary, other times of arms, other times of love and good customs. These three themes were understand by the Romantics as those of faith (fé), patriotism (patria), and love (amor).

After the first session, the poems were put into writing and taken by the mantenidors for secret deliberations (the jurat), where the poems were examined for fidelity to the rules and their faults were carefully enumerated. Stress was laid upon the identification of vicis (vices, faults) in the esteemed llibres de l'art (books of the art), the treatises carried by the mantenidors. The second session was held after the judgement was passed and there the winner was declared and the prizes awarded.

== Poetic content and style ==
The isolation and their classicism of the Consistoris (of Toulouse and Barcelona) cut them off from the literary movements giving life to other vernaculars, such as the dolce stil novo and the Renaissance in Italian and the work of Ausias March associated with the zenith of medieval Catalan. Martín de Riquer is highly critical of the negative influence of the Toulousain academy on Catalan poetry through the exportation occitanisms and support of an outmoded literary language. For its thematically limited, narrow conception of art and imposing rules for form and content, he compares it to French neoclassicism and its "tyranny of the monotonous alexandrine". All these bad influences continued their negative effect from Barcelona, where the rhetorical style of Toulouse was copied. The picture of judges marking of "vices" in the margins of the poems submitted for competition is emblematic of the "tyranny" the rules held over creativity. In these respects the Consistori was much like a medieval university. It was also more bourgeois, being essentially created by citizens for citizens, with their tastes and their concerns in mind. The essential difference between the activities and the poetry of the Consistori and that of the earlier troubadours is that the latter composed (originally) in a courtly environment and share courtly tastes and concerns. In this respect the movement mirrored that of the dolce stil novo in Italy, but it was less successful. The failure of the city of Barcelona to support the Consistori and its falling back on royal patronage in 1396 best exemplifies the problems of consciously continuing the troubadour tradition in an atmosphere that was not made for it.

Few poems have survived from the Consistori's contests, preserved in chansonniers with other troubadour songs. The Cançoner dels Masdovelles is one of the most important songbooks, yet only three songs can be connected to the Consistori de Barcelona with any certainty. Gilabert de Próxita wrote Le souvenirs qu'amors fina me porta, a secular song on love, in the manner of the troubadours. According to its forty-second line, it was presented al novell consistori (to the new consistory), probably the re-creation of Martin the Humane. Andreu Febrer composed Sobre.l pus naut element de tots quatre, an astrological and mythological panegyric for an unnamed queen of Sicily. It alludes to the cossistori, but this may be a reference to some competition held in Sicily. Another troubadour with surviving work presented at Barcelona is Guillem de Masdovelles, who also competed (and won) at Toulouse. His canso of love Pus li prat son de verdura guarnit was "coronada" (crowned) the winner at a contest in Barcelona. Guillem's work is written in an Occitan sprinkled with catalanisms and Andreu's in Catalan with occitanisms. Apparently, the language of the poetry presented at the Catalan consistori was not constant (besides being romance). Guillem's nephew, Joan Berenguer de Masdovelles, did translate his uncle's winning poem from llemoví (Occitan) into Catalan. Joan Berenguer's translations of his uncle's Occitan works demonstrates the conscious use of a literary idiom as opposed to the language of conversation and the consciously archaic nature of occitanisms in Catalan writing.

== Legacy and influence ==
The Consistori of Barcelona is generally considered a transitional period in Catalan literature, away from the prestigious treatment of Occitan and the pervasiveness of occitanisms and towards an independent Catalan poetry. In many respects it is the last phase of medieval literature and of the troubadours, opening the way to what can be considered Renaissance literature in Catalan. The Consistori, or more specifically the Gay Science that it fostered in the Iberian peninsula, extended its influence slowly over Castile and Portugal to the west. Enrique de Villena's Castilian Arte de trovar was probably written with the intention of exhorting its dedicatee, the Marqués de Santillana, to found and patronise a Consistori in Castile modelled after the Barcelonan example:

. . . vos informado por el dicho tratado seas originidat donde tomen lumbre, y dotrina todos los otros del Regno que se dizen trobadores, para que lo sean verdaderamente.	. . . that you might be informed by the said treatise of the origin from which they obtain this light and this teaching, they all the others of the realm, who are called "troubadours", because they are truly such.

Somehow anyway the Marqués did absorb the concept of the Gay Science, for he wrote to Duke Pedro of Coimbra a famous letter, Prohemio e carta, which extols the divinely inspired, charismatic yet frenetic nature of the gaya sçiençia. This conception of the troubadours' art was fundamentally altered by the infusion of neoplatonism that came with the Renaissance and Italian influence. Nonetheless, Spanish poetry of the fifteenth century, more so than anywhere else, sought to emulate classic Occitan poetry. Alfonso the Magnanimous in particular, despite his classicism, brought a distinctly medieval, Occitan, and troubadour-esque poetry to Naples with his 1443 conquest. This Spanish literary tradition at Naples remained outside Renaissance currents. In Spain, troubadour scholarship got off to a quick start in the sixteenth century, but the influence of the Consistori can hardly be spoken of past the mid-fifteenth century.

== List of known works ==
- Andreu Febrer: Sobre.l pus naut element de tots quatre edited by Martí de Riquer in Andreu Febrer, Poesies (Barcelona: Barcino, 1951).
- Gilabert de Próixita: Le sovenirs qu'amors fina me porta edited by Martí de Riquer in Gilabert de Próixita, Poesies (Barcelona: Barcino, 1954).
- Guillem de Masdovelles: Pus li prat són de verdura guarnit edited by Ramon Aramon i Serra in Cançoner dels Masdovelles (Barcelona: I.E.C., 1938).
