= Gilabert de Próixita =

Valencian poet

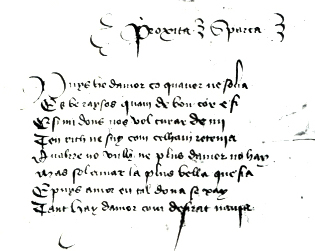
Manuscript facsimile of Puys he d’amor ço qu’aver ne solia by Gilabert de Próixita (the Proxita of the MS), labelled a sparsa, stand-alone stanza

Gilabert de Próixita (died 4 December 1405) was a Valencian poet with twenty-one extant Occitan pieces. He is credited by his first editor with a renovellament (renewal) of Catalan poetry through the incorporation of Italian and French ideas into a model of courtly love taken from the classical troubadours. His last name is variously spelled Próxita, Próxida, and Progita in medieval orthography.

== Biography ==
Gilabert was a member of an old Neapolitan family, the Procida, favourites of the Hohenstaufen and then of Peter III of Aragon, who established them in Valencia. By the fourteenth century they were involved in a local conflict on the side of the Centelles against the Vilaragut. Gilabert was the fifth son of Nicolau de Próxita and Elvira de Centelles. With his older brothers Olf and Tomàs he participated in the expedition to Sicily under Martin the Humane in 1392. In 1395 he and his brothers took part in John I's expedition to Sardinia and Sicily.

On returning from military service abroad to Valencia in 1396 Gilabert became involved in the conflict between the Centelles and the Vilaragut and in May that year was sentenced, along with the factional leaders, to exile by the city council. On 11 November 1398 he and some other knights led a band of Centelles, including forty men-at-arms, in street fighting against Pere de Vilaragut. As a result, he was imprisoned again and did not regain his freedom until October 1399.

On 4 December 1405, according to a document uncovered in the Arxiu Municipal de València (Municipal Archive of Valencia) by Lluís Cerveró i Gomis, Gilabert died in Genoa while in the service of Pope Benedict XIII. He left behind a widow, Bernarda de Valeriola, who remarried to Guillem Ramon de Centelles, and a daughter Joana. He was buried in the familial chapel of Sant Honorat in the convent of Sant Domingo de València.

== Poetry ==
Gilabert was basically unknown until his poems were published in a modern edition by Martí de Riquer in Poesies (Els Nostres Clàssics: Barcelona, 1954). Many of his poems are found only in the Cançoner Vega-Aguiló, which has suffered damage to do poor humidity, rendering much of his work illegible to the naked eye. Ultraviolet innovations have, however, permitted this difficulty to be overcome and now his poems have been copied in their entirety. The Vega-Aguiló only records their author as "Próxita", but the library of the Escorial contains a sixteenth-century Occitan chansonnier with some works by "Mossèn Gilabert de Próxita, poeta".

=== Prosody and language ===
Gilabert used a variety of meters: heptasyllabic, octosyllabic, and most of all decasyllabic. Some poems vary the metre but it is always intentional: Gilabert is second to none among his generation in the perfection of his metre, which appears to be influenced by the standards of the Consistori del Gay Saber in Toulouse.

Though Gilabert wrote in literary Occitan, clearly inspired by and learned from the classical troubadours, his language is not devoid of Catalan influences, especially where the adopted idiom lacks a solution to a problem. For all this he has a richer vocabulary than his contemporary Catalans.

=== Theme ===
Gilabert's surviving poetry is uniform in theme. It is a subjective treatment of love and the various states it gives rise to in the poet. His poetry is completely impoverished of references or allusions to anything historical or objective and it is never narrative or anecdotal. The sole "facts" which can be gleaned from his total œuvre are that he was a knight, his wife came from a higher social stratum, and one of his poems was presented to a novell consistori (new consistory), probably the Consistori de Barcelona, founded 1393.

The themes that dominated Occitan poetry at the turn of the thirteenth century dominate Gilabert's poetry at the turn of the fourteenth, in a peculiarly exaggerated form. He is greater than the troubadours, however, in his originality of his details and the accuracy of his expression. To the lady to whom he pledges vassalage he also presents himself a humble and loyal servant, willing to do whatever pleases her, even allowing himself to be killed. Gilabert is essentially feudal in his terminology.

Gilabert dwells on the cruelty (cruseltat granda) of the lady and the llanguiment (disease) of the poet, his love, which pushes him to extremes (like death) and obsession. This drove him to greater heights of poetic eloquence than most of his Catalan contemporaries. This obsessiveness he shares with Andreu Febrer. The lines

Mas ya d'uymay sots en la derraria,
que ma dolor e mos mals cesseran;
car per vos muyr, d'on per mort fineran
los gran turme[n]ts que·m donatz cascun dia.
Ja no us porets ab me plus deportar . . .

from Pus que vos play, dompna, que res no us dia were almost certainly on the mind of Jordi de Sant Jordi when he began his famous Stramps.

=== Style ===
Gilabert, despite his expressiveness and subjectivity, is not an introspective poet. He can be repetitive and artificial. Though he sometimes loses himself in lengthy and wordy explanations he does not stray into the trobar ric, as does his contemporary Andreu Febrer. His writing is grammatically impeccable. Most of his images and metaphors are not original, like the "Castell d'Amor" (castle of love), but are current for his time. His military allusions are more effective because they stem from personal experiences. Other ornaments of Gilabert's poetry, evidence of the scope of the poet's reading, are the story of the bird burned by flying near the Sun and the foolish alchemist.

For two poems Gilabert adopted a French-style ballade, then new to Catalonia: Mals perladors vulh per tostemps maldir and Lo cor e·lhs huelhs m'an lo cors mis en pena. The themes, such as lausengiers (the jealous), remain troubadour-esque and the works pulse with the semicavalleresc ambient of c. 1400 Valencia.

There is similarity between Gilabert's phrase de valor coronada and Dante's coronata e vestita d'umilitate, but the coronation is the only commonality. Dante's "humility" gives the sense of virtue, but Gilabert's "valour" is purely feudal/chivalric in tenor. He considers himself de la mainada ("of the mesnada") of his dona (lady), as he was of the king's and the faction's during his military career. He is closer to his classical troubadour forebears of c. 1200 than the Italians of his own day, though his poetry displays a familiarity with Dante. In Dona del mon no·s pens que per amors Gilabert endeavours to keep the lady's name (and their love) a secret, lest she have others who believe they are loved by her. He inserts certain words in the poem specifically for this lady to whom it is dedicated, and whom he has been serving for nine years. A parallel exists between Gilabert's unnamed lady and Dante's donna-schermo of the Vita nuova.

== Edited texts available online ==
- Incipitario de Gilabert de Próixita.
