= Ramon d'Abella =

14th-century Catalan military leader

Ramon d'Abella (fl. 1389–1401) was a Catalan military leader and royal councillor under John I and Martin of the Crown of Aragon.

During the guerra dels armanyaguesos in 1389, Ramon led a regiment of cavalry in the area around Torroella de Montgrí and Palafrugell. The young poet Guillem de Masdovelles fought under Ramon in these campaigns against Bernard VII of Armagnac and composed a sirventesch dedicated to him. It was probably sometime before this war that Ramon had a falling out with Guerau de Queralt i de Rocabertí.

In 1392 Ramon purchased the castle of Solivella and its jurisdiction, both high and low, for 16,500 Aragonese sous from John I. From 1395 to 1397 and again from 1398 to 1401 he served as governor of the Kingdom of Majorca. His lieutenant was Berenguer de Montagut.
