= Jaume Safont =

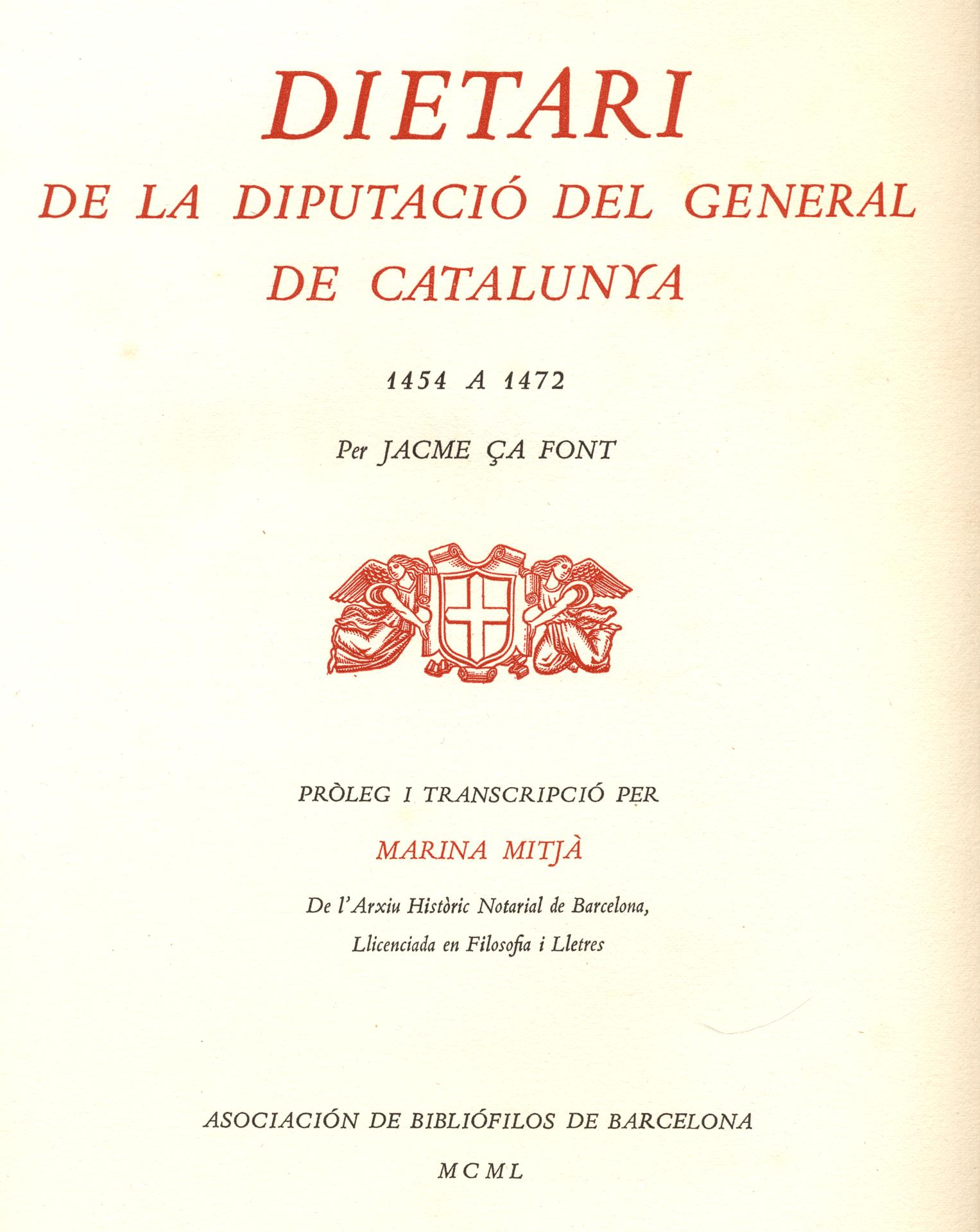

Jaume Safont (1420–1487), called Jacme ça Font in contemporary records, was a Catalan poet and notary.

From March 1436 he worked as a scrivener for the municipal council of Barcelona, his birthplace, and from July 1440 he worked in the scriptorium of the Generalitat de Catalunya. In that capacity he wrote the Dietari de la Generalitat for the years between 1454 and 1472. The Dietari is a daily record of events political, military, and religious for the use of the Generalitat. Jaume compiled his information for the Diputació del General that covers the years between 1411 and 1478/84; his years are the most detailed and anecdotal. The Dietari was edited under the title Dietari, o, Llibre de jornades de Jaume Safont by Josep Maria Sans i Travé (Barcelona: Fundació Noguera, 1992).

In 1462 Jaume was named procurator in charge of collecting the imposts known as the generalitats. In politics he was a member of the faction known as the Biga and opposed the royal interests of Alfonso the Magnanimous. When the opponents of the Biga, the Busca, removed the Lieutenant of Catalonia, Galceran de Requesens y Santa Coloma, and took control of the Barcelonan government in 1456, instituting protectionist reforms, Jaume records in his Dietari the tension that existed between the Biga-dominated Generalitat and the royally-supported Busca municipal council. During the Catalan Civil War, he supported Charles, Prince of Viana, against John II.

== Bibliography ==
- Història de la Generalitat de Catalunya i els seus Presidents. Barcelona: Enciclopèdia Catalana, 2003. ISBN 84-412-0884-0.
- Riquer, Martí de (1964). Història de la Literatura Catalana, vol. 1. Barcelona: Edicions Ariel.
