= Ivany =

Ivany is a surname. Notable people with the name include:

- George Ivany (born 1938), President of the University of Saskatchewan (1989–1999)
- Jack St. Ivany (born 1999), American professional ice hockey defenseman
- Joel Ivany, Canadian stage director, founder of Against the Grain Theatre in Toronto, Ontario
- Linda Ivany, professor in the Earth Sciences department at Syracuse University
- Peter Ivany AO (born 1954), Australian entrepreneur
- Ray Ivany ONS OC, Canadian executive
- Robert Ivany (born 1947), major general in the United States Army
- Joseph Julius Hubert Szent-Ivany (1910–1988), Hungarian entomologist specializing in Lepidoptera
- Martinus Szent-Ivany (1633–1708), polymathic Hungarian Jesuit writer and theologian

== See also ==
- Iványi
