= Johan Basset =

Ffra Johan Basset (Catalan pronunciation: [ʒuˈam bəˈsɛt], modernised as Fra Joan Basset) was a Catalan author of twenty verses and a prose Letovari. His work is preserved in the Cançoner Vega-Aguiló (1420–30). He was probably active in the early years (1416–21) of the reign of Alfonso V. His religious title, fra ("brother"), has led to speculation that he was a knight of the Order of Saint John of Jerusalem (based on an unsourced assertion of Jordi Rubió). Basset preached at Cervera during Lent in 1424. It is recorded that he was a member of the "Order of Santa Anna". This is probably a reference to the convent of Santa Anna at Barcelona, which was originally a house of the Order of the Holy Sepulchre under the guidance of the Patriarch of Jerusalem. Cohabitating at Santa Anna was a group of Brothers of Penitence and some Augustinian canons of Santa Eulàlia del Camp (since 1293). In 1420 the friars and canons passed into the Casa del Sant Sepulcre de Santa Anna.

Basset was a competent and original poet; his poetry diverse in form and style, his themes both religious and amorous. Besides his religious and amorous poetry, Basset wrote three unique pieces: a planh, a piece entitled Vers lauda, and another called Vers clus. Basset's Letovari (electuarium) is a manual for curing the love-sick, dedicated to Guerau de Massanet. It has much in common with the Consolació of Luys Ycart and the Medicina of Bernat Metge.

Basset's religious verse consists in four poems about the Virgin Mary. His Dansa de Nostra Dona was his first published work: it was edited by Manuel Milà i Fontanals and published in his Obras completas (1886–93). Its incipit is Ab letres d'aur per mesura and it was addressed to an anonymous lady de Sant Climent (from Sant Climent de Taüll). A similarly titled piece, the Dansa e laors de Nostra Dona, has the form of a typical love song (cançó); only its title betrays its religious purpose. It incipit is Lausan vostra saviesa.

Basset's Dir me cové si be.m tench l'engeny fflach and Mayres de Dieu, valerosa princesa are also addressed to Mary. In the latter, each stanza begins with a line introducing the Mayres de Dieu followed by six lines beginning e cert molt val ("is certainly more worthy") and ending with the refrain e res no val tant com la vostra cort ("and nothing is worth as much as your court"). The structure of this piece and its contents suggest it is a religious plazer, a genre introduced to Catalonia by Cerverí de Girona over a century earlier and Catalanised by Pere March within Basset's lifetime.

Basset's love poetry fits within the tradition of courtly love and of the troubadours. This is obvious when he refers to himself as a "prisoner" of his lady and in his use of feudal and military terminology to describe their relationship.

== List of poems ==
- Ab fin voler vos am, senyora bella (or belha)
- Ab letres d'aur per mesura
- Amor servir honran, presan e tembre
- Amors, de suspirs
- Aspres dolors, penetrant, me destenta
- Astres no us fuig pus tan sabers se planta
- Be·ls (or Belha) mil(s) sospirs vos fau tot jorn de renda
- Creure podets, senyora valarosa
- Dir me cove, se be·m tench l’engeny flach
- Dompna valen de lial valor, tembre (or Dompna valén de tal valor tembre)
- En miey del cor porti VII colps mortals
- Garaus amichs
- Lausan vostra saviesa
- Mayres de Dieu, valerosa princessa
- No desir tant del mon la senyoria
- Per gran rayso, cruel dona malvada
- Princessa proz, valens, d'auta semença
- Pus avets bondat despesa
- Senyora valen
- Terribles crits, agres, provocatoris
- Una canço novelha vulh xantar
- Us arbres sechs, verts, say, fulhats e fulhes
- Us drachs fiblans va pel mon trop correns
- Yeu vos requir, Na ladria malvada
