= Joaquín Bartrina =

Spanish poet and playwright

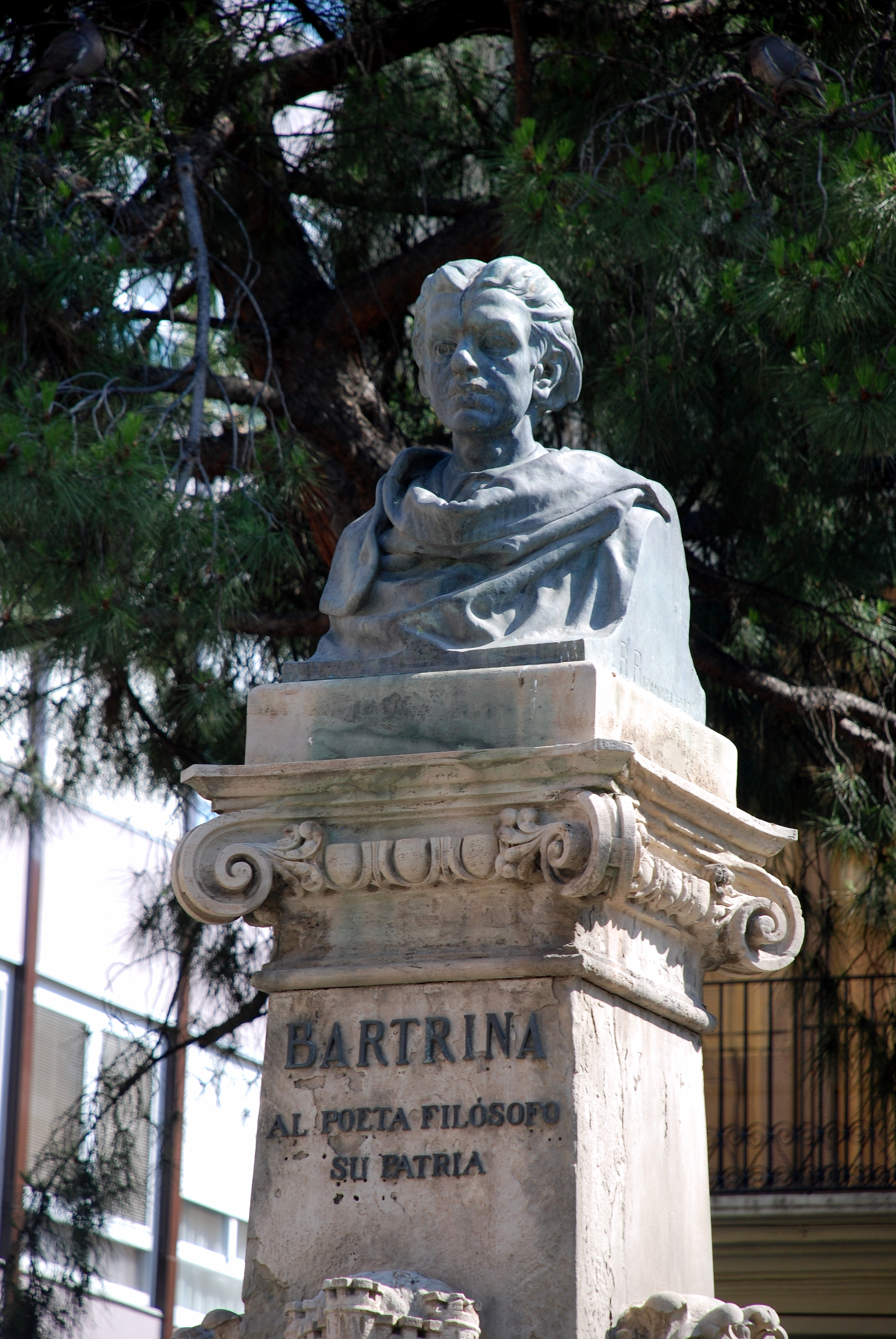
Joaquim Bartrina

Joaquim Maria Bartrina i de Aixemús (26 April 1850–4 August 1880) was a Spanish poet and playwright born in Reus, Spain, whose work is linked to the Realist movement. He is considered one of the founding fathers of the Catalan literary avant-garde.

In 1876, Bartrina was the first to make a Castilian translation of Charles Darwin's book The Descent of Man. Bartrina was a supporter of Darwinism.
