= Oton III de Grandson =

14th century French nobleman

Oton III de Grandson, name also spelled Otto, Othon, etc. (died 7 August 1397), was a nobleman, soldier, and poet in fourteenth century France. Although his military service was primarily to the King of England, his reputation for chivalry and poetry was renowned throughout Europe.

== Life ==
Oton de Grandson was born in Savoy between 1340 and 1350 to William of Grandson and his wife Jeanne of Vienna. His family was of the highest nobility. On September 25, 1365, he married Jeanne d'Allamand daughter of Humbert d'Allamand, lord of Aubonne and Coppet.

He was captured in combat in 1372 by the Spanish, allies of France, and spent two years in prison. In 1374 he was ransomed by the King of England Edward III and returned to military service. When his father died in 1386, he returned to Savoy and inherited the lordship of Sainte-Croix, Grandcour, Cudrefin, Aubonne and Coppet. He became a close advisor and ally of Bonne of Bourbon, the dowager countess of Savoy who ruled in the name of her son Amadeus VII, called the Red Count. He was imprisoned again for some time in 1389 for unknown reasons.

== Duel ==
When the Red Count died following an accident on horseback, his doctor was accused of murdering him and, as she had recommended him to her son, Bonne of Bourbon was accused of complicity. As her ally, Oton was also implicated in the ensuing controversy that pitted the various regional lords against each other. In 1393, two years after Amadeus VII's death, the doctor implicated Bonne of Bourbon and Oton de Grandson specifically in the count's death. Oton fled to England; he was condemned and his lands confiscated in 1393. In 1395, however, Oton was declared innocent by the French king, Charles VI and he returned to Savoy. Accusations against him were renewed, however, and he was forced to engage in a judicial combat by the young count Amédée VIII. He was killed by his accuser, Gérard d'Estavayer, a much younger man, on August 7, 1397. A near contemporary poet, Olivier de la Marche, recorded the details of the duel in his chronicle Livre de l'advis du gaige de bataille. The château of Oton de Grandson, dating from the 11th century, is in Switzerland.

== Reputation ==
Oton de Grandson had a reputation as a fine and courteous knight. The poet and chronicler Jean Froissart hails him as the paragon of knightly valor in his Chroniques. However, it is his poetic prowess that endures. He is celebrated by poets such as Eustache Deschamps, Christine de Pizan, Alain Chartier, Martin Le Franc, Georges Chastellain, Oliver de La Marche and Geoffrey Chaucer, all of whom imitated his courtly poetry. He was friends with Deschamps and Chaucer.

The woman whom Oton de Grandson loved is sometimes referred to as Isabelle in acrostics in the Souhait de saint Valentin, the Complainte de Grandson, and the Songe de saint Valentin, and is also called “la non-per France.” Because she was of too high a rank for him to hope for, she may have been Isabeau de Bavière, Queen consort of Charles VI. This steadfast devotion, expressed repeatedly in his poetry and maintained until his death, earned him the reputation of one of the most courtly lovers in France.

== Poetry ==
Oton de Grandson composed around 80 poems during his life, for a total of more than 6,000 verses. Among them are

1. La Complainte de saint Valentin, written in octosyllables (extant in 4 manuscripts)
2. La Complainte de l'an nouvel, written in decasyllables (extant in 2 manuscripts)
3. La Pastourelle, written in octosyllables (extant in 5 manuscripts)
4. Le Livre Messire Ode, written in octosyllabic couplets (extant in 3 manuscripts)
5. La Complainte amoureuse de saint Valentin (1 manuscript)
6. La Complainte d'Amour (extant in 14 manuscripts)
7. L'Estrenne du jour de l'an
8. Le Lai de plour
9. Le Songe de sain Valentin (imitated by Chaucer in The parlement of Foules and the Book of the Duchess)
10. La Belle dame qui eut mercy was attributed to Oton de Grandson by Piaget in 1904, but by 1941 this attribution was retracted.

Arthur Piaget, Oton de Granson et ses poésies. Romania, 19 (1890) p. 237-259, 403-448.

Kosta-Théfaine, Jean-François, Othon de Grandson, chevalier et poète, Éditions Paradigme, Medievalia, 2007

== Manuscripts and editions ==
At least 18 manuscripts conserve his poetic works, although there is no extant manuscript written in his hand.

Several of his ballads are included in the Jardin de Plaisance et Fleur de Rhétorique (1501).
