= Pere d'Abella =

Catalan poet

Pere d'Abella was a 15th-century Catalan poet. He is the author of Pus aix-t plau ta bandera estendre (It pleases your flag to fly), in which he expresses the conventions of troubadour love.
