= Alexandre de Riquer =

Catalan artist

Alexandre de Riquer i Ynglada
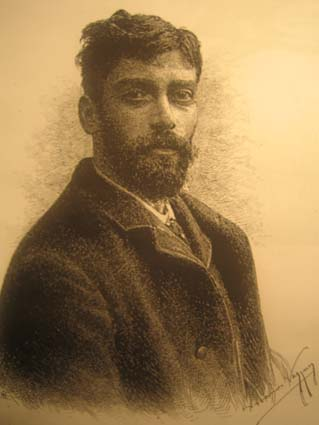
- Born: Alexandre de Riquer i Ynglada; 3 May 1856
- Died: 13 November 1920 (aged 64); Palma, Majorca
- Education: School of Fine Arts in Toulouse of Languedoc, France
- Known for: Poster art, lithography
- Movement: Art Nouveau, Modernisme
- Spouse: Dolors Palau Gonzalez de Quijano

Alexandre de Riquer i Ynglada, 7th Count of Casa Dávalos (Catalan pronunciation: [ələkˈsandɾə ðə riˈke]) (Born 3 May 1856 - 13 November 1920), was a versatile artist intellectual and Catalan designer, illustrator, painter, engraver, writer and poet. He was one of the leading figures of Modernisme in Catalonia. He belonged to an aristocratic family, the Counts of Casa Dávalos. His father, Martí de Riquer, Marquis of Benavent, was a senior leader of the Carlists of Catalonia, while his mother, Elisea Ynglada, belonged to a family of intellectuals and artists (including writers such as Joseph and Wifred Coroleu and painter Ricard Modest Urgell).

In 1885, he was married to Dolors Palau Gonzalez de Quijano. "Between 1886 and 1898 he fathered nine children (three of whom died in infancy) and it was this responsibility with its attendant economic pressures which doubtless gave added, even urgent stimulus to Riquer's professional dedication."

== Riquer as an artist ==
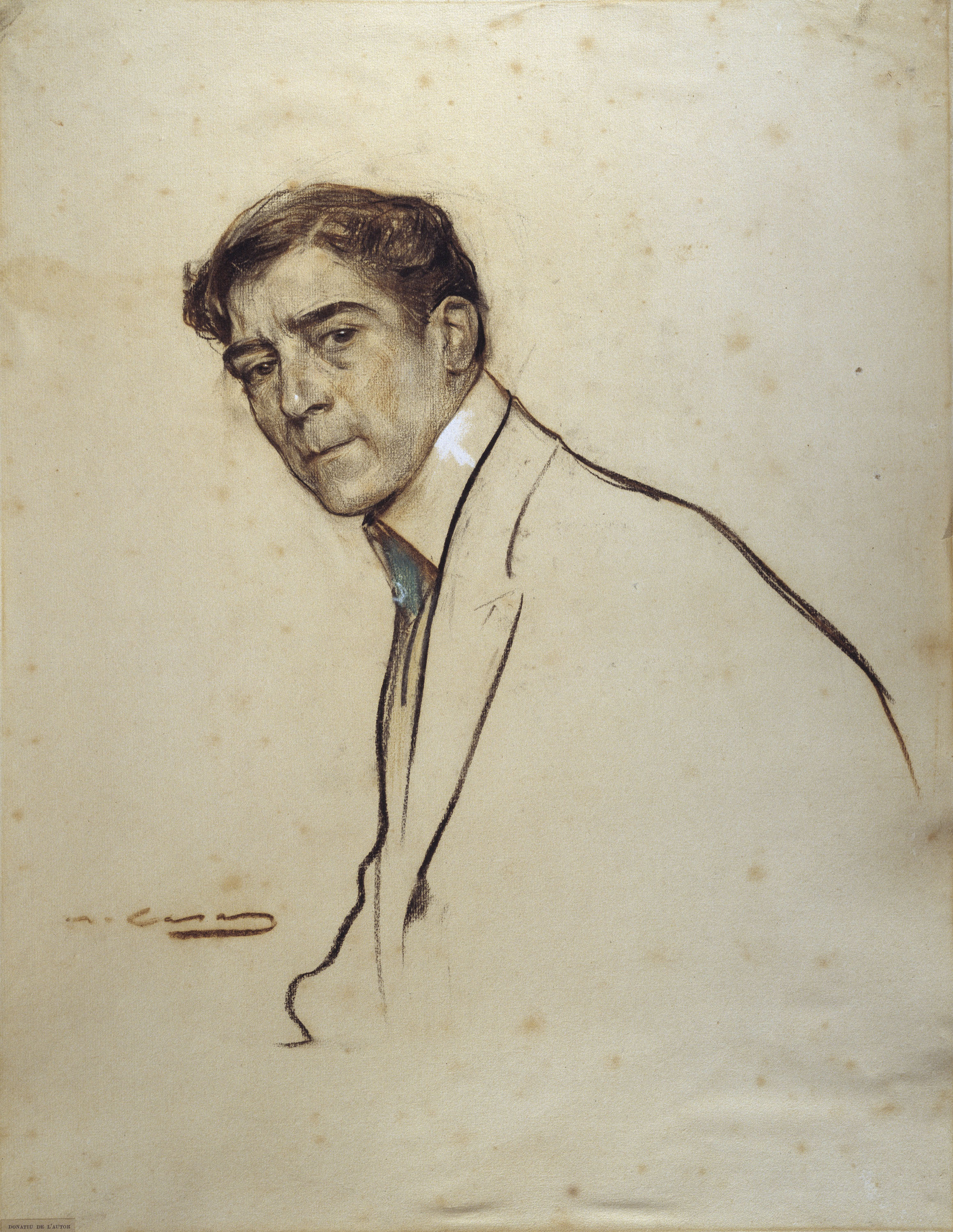
Alexandre de Riquer seen by Ramon Casas (MNAC).

Riquer studied in France, first in Béziers between 1869 and 1871. "It was in Beziers that Riquer painted the first canvasses of his apprenticeship, and it was there that clear signs of a powerful artistic vocation, doubtless inherited from his mother, came to be prominent in his life." For his interest in drawing classes he enrolled in the School of Fine Arts in Toulouse of Languedoc, France. Then returned to Barcelona to continue his studies at the art school of La Llotja "where he was to study for several years under Tomas Padro, Claudi Lorenzale and, in particular, Antoni Caba, the teacher who he most admired."

He entered the world of publishing through the guidance of his friend, writer and illustrator Apel-les Mestres. "In 1876, Riquer took over some of his work on ornamental lettering and cover illustration," which led to a collaborative publishing work which brought great impact on Riquer's creative activity. By 1879, he is becoming known in the art world.

The diversification of his work continued in the following years by designing jewelry, programs, furniture decoration and ceramic painting. In the year 1894, he was introduced to the movement of the pre-Raphaelites. His first trip to London in 1894 is where he "discovered modern poster and that the idea of propagating the form was embraced as a missionary undertaking. The artist's view of his role in [Barcelona]: Posters! Why, ever since I saw the first of the new posters the thing tempted me so strongly that I offered to do tradesmen's posters her for nothing; not one would listen to me. Two of his posters were published in Les Maîtres de l'Affiche.

English art and Japanese art would cause a great influence on his creations. Riquer distinguished himself as a graphic designer with great drawing skills. He made posters, etchings, illustrations in books and magazines, certificates, postcards, stamps, menus, sheet music, business cards and bookplates (which Lluís de Yebra documented 142 articles between 1900 and 1924).

He died in Palma de Mallorca in 1920. "His library and the undispersed part of his collections were acquired after his death by the Barcelona Museums and the National Library of Catalonia."

== Training ==
- 1869-1871: Béziers (France)
- 1873-1874: School of Fine Arts (Toulouse)
- 1874: La Llotja (Barcelona)
- 1879: Painting apprenticeship (Rome)

== Exhibitions ==
- 1878 - first publicly exhibited canvas
- 1886 - Julia Hospitalari
- 1890 - first solo show at Sala Parés
- 1893 - biennial exhibition at Sala Parés

== Publications ==
- 1879 - La Academia (Madrid)
- 1880 - La Illustracio Catalana
- 1882-1883 - Arte y Letras
- 1886 - Los Estudiants de Tolosa (Catalan folksong edition)
- 1903 - Ex-libris d'Alexandre de Riquer

== Notes ==
Spanish nobility
Preceded by Martín de Riquer y Comelles, 6th Count of Casa Dávalos	Count of Casa Dávalos ?–13 November 1920	Succeeded by Martín de Riquer, 8th Count of Casa Dávalos
