= Llibre dels àngels =

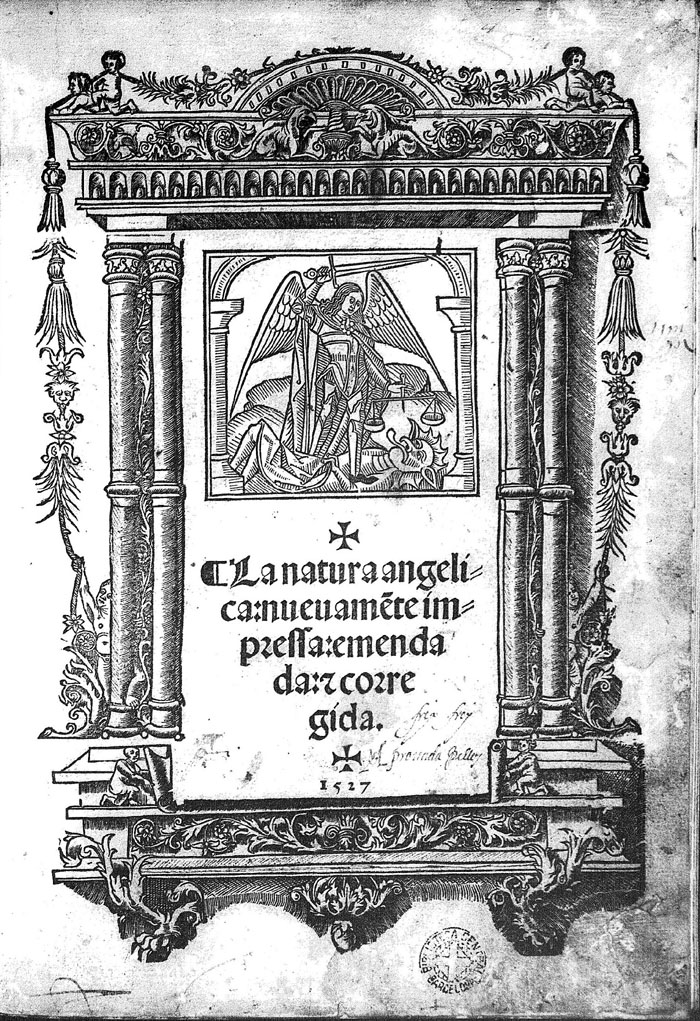
Title page of the translation into Spanish of Francesc Eiximenis' Llibre dels Àngels (Book of Angels), printed in Alcalá de Henares in 1527 by Miguel de Eguía

The Llibre dels àngels (Valencian pronunciation: [ˈʎibɾe delz ˈaɲd͡ʒels]; lit. 'Book of Angels') is a literary work that was written by Francesc Eiximenis in 1392 in Valencia in Catalan. It was dedicated to Pere d'Artés, who was a kind of Chancellor of the Exchequer of the Crown of Aragon, and who was a close friend of him. It has two hundred and one chapters, and it is divided into five treatises.

== General information ==
This book is a real treatise about angelology, but with several political thoughts. It was maybe the most successful Eiximenis' book, since it was translated into Latin (it is the only Eiximenis' book that was translated into that language), into Spanish, into French, and even into Flemish (maybe it was the only Medieval Catalan book that was translated into that language).

Furthermore, one of the French incunable editions was the first printed book in the Swiss city of Geneva. We could say that this matter should have been treated in Eiximenis' Huitè (eighth volume) of his encyclopedic project Lo Crestià. This book should have dealt with the order of things and creatures according to medieval mentality. This order appears in what he calls "strata", and he considers that angels are one of these strata, according to the theological Medieval mentality. It appears in the famous Peter Lombard's Four Books of Sentences Quattuor libri sententiarum. The second book deals with angels. Eiximenis confirms that in the 43rd chapter of his Segon del Crestià (Second volume of Lo Crestià).

== Influence on the city and Kingdom of Valencia ==
Without exaggerating, it can be said that this book had a decisive influence in the spread of the cult and devotion of angels in the city of Valencia and the Kingdom of Valencia. The same year that the Llibre dels àngels was written (1392), the Consell General de València (General Council of Valencia. It was the city government authority) agreed on 9 August to decorate the Sala del Consell (Council Hall) with several figures, and one of these was the guardian angel. This cult and devotion was progressing and spreading years later. So in 1411 a service for the guardian angel of Valencia was composed, and it appears in some breviaries of those years. In 1446 in the Cathedral of Valencia the yearly festivity of the guardian angel began to be celebrated, according to a certain ritual.

== Digital editions of the Llibre dels Àngels ==
=== Manuscripts ===
- Edition in the Biblioteca Virtual Joan Lluís Vives (Virtual Library Joan Lluís Vives) of the Ms. 86 from the University of Barcelona's Reserve Books. (in Catalan)

=== Incunabula ===
- Edition in the Memòria Digital de Catalunya (Digital Memory of Catalonia) of the Joan Rosembach's incunabulum edition (Barcelona, 21 June 1494). (in Catalan)
- Edition in the Biblioteca Digital Hispánica (Hispanic Digital Library) of the incunabulum edition of the translation into Spanish that was printed by Fadrique de Basilea (Burgos, 15 October 1490). (in Spanish)
- Edition in the Gallica (digitalized documents and books from the Bibliothèque nationale de France) of the incunabulum edition of the translation into French that was printed in Geneva by Adam Steinschaber on 24 March 1478. (in French)
- Edition in the Virtual Library of the University of Liège of the incunabulum edition of the translation into French that was printed in Lyon by Guillaume Le Roy on 20 May 1486. (in French)

=== Old editions ===
- Edition in the Biblioteca Virtual Joan Lluís Vives (Virtual Library Joan Lluís Vives) of the translation into Spanish that was printed by Miguel de Eguía in Alcalá de Henares on 28 January 1527. (in Spanish)

=== Modern editions ===
- De Sant Miquel arcàngel, edition of the fifth treatise of the Llibre dels Àngels by Curt Wittlin (Barcelona. Curial Edicions Catalanes. 1983. 177 pp). (in Catalan)
- Edició crítica del 'Libre dels àngels' (1392) de Francesc Eiximenis. Catàleg de mss., índexs d'autors, bíblic i temàtic. Doctoral thesis of Sergi Gascón Urís (Universitat Autònoma de Barcelona. 1992, 931 pp.; microfiche ed., UAB 1993)

=== The Llibre dels Àngels inside Eiximenis' complete works ===
- Francesc Eiximenis' complete works (in Catalan and in Latin).
