= Josep Pedrals i Urdàniz =

Spanish poet and rhapsodist

Josep Pedrals
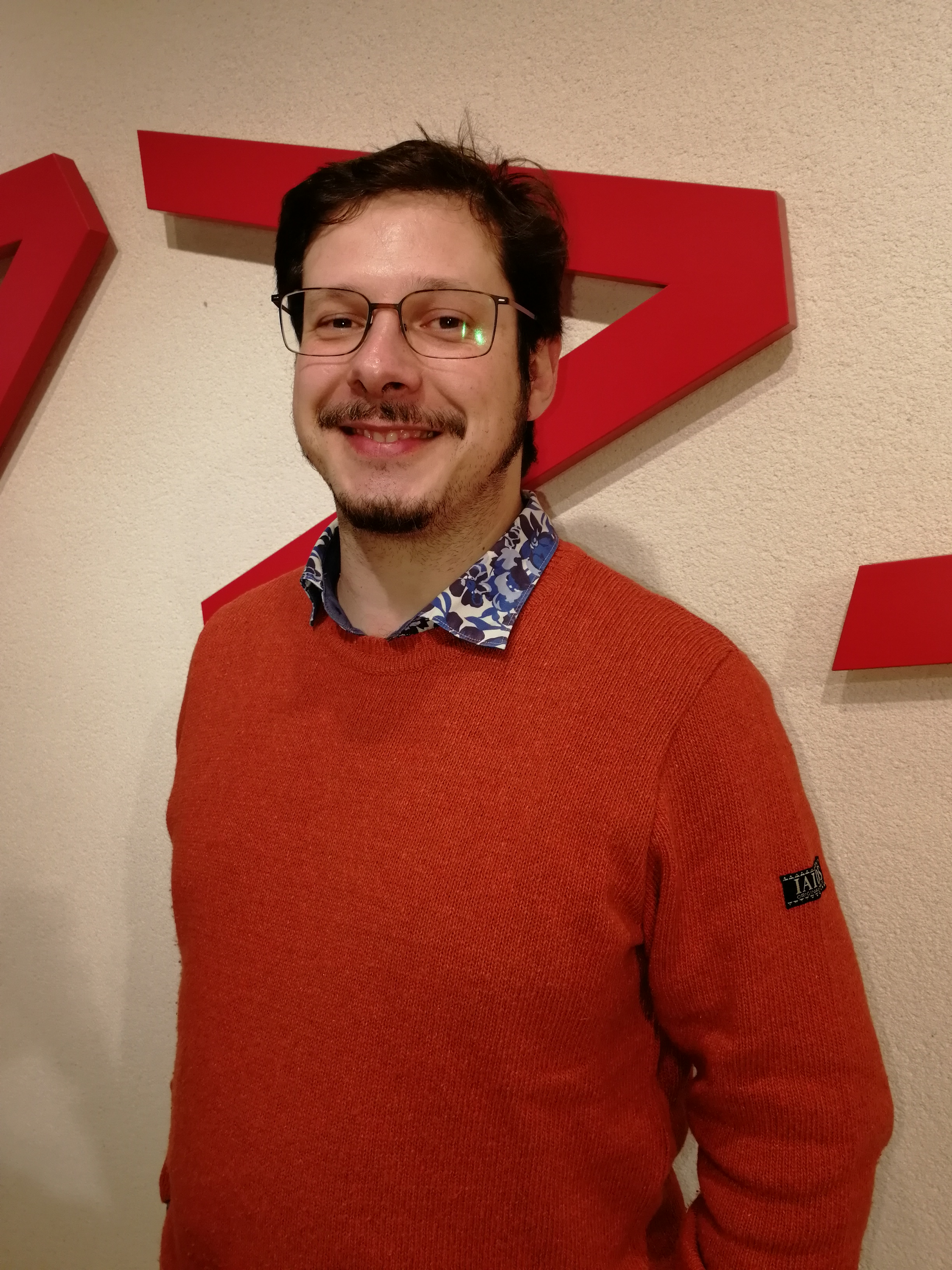
- Born: 13 January 1979 (age 47); Barcelona, Catalonia, Spain
- Writing career
- Language: Catalan
- Genre: Poetry
- Notable awards: Premi Lletra d'Or (2013); Premi Ciutat de Barcelona (2018)

Josep Pedrals i Urdàniz (Barcelona, 13 January 1979) is a Spanish poet and rhapsodist. He is a personality in the world of poetry reading in the Catalan Countries. He has also contributed to various mass media, including the Avui newspaper, Catalunya Ràdio or the magazines El Temps, Paper of Vidre and Bossa Nova. As a musician, in 2007 he staged the hip-hop show Endoll, together with Guillamino. He performed with Explosión Bikini and Els Nens Eutròfics.

== Published work ==
Poetry
- Escola italiana. Barcelona: Ed. 62, 2003 (ISBN 978-84-297-5272-4)
- El furgatori. Cornellà de Llobregat: LaBreu, 2006 (ISBN 978-84-933762-8-4)
- En/doll. Castellar del Vallès: LaBreu, 2007, with Guillamino
- El Romanço d'Anna Tirant. Castellar del Vallès: LaBreu, 2012
- Qui no mereix una pallissa (con Melcior Comes, Pere Antoni Pons y Jordi Rourera)

Represented plays
- Puaj!. Reus: Teatre La Palma, 2005
- Wamba va! (with Eduard Escofet, Martí Sales Sariola). Barcelona: Mercat de les Flors, 2005
- En comptes de la lletera. Barcelona: La Seca. Espai Brossa, 2012
- El Furgatori. Barcelona: La Seca. Espai Brossa, 2012

== Literary awards ==
- Premi Lletra d'Or, 2013: El Romanço d'Anna Tirant
- Ciutat de Barcelona Award, 2018: Els límits del Quim Porta
