= Jacme Scrivà =

Catalan knight and poet

Jacme Scrivà was a Catalan knight and poet of the late fourteenth century. In contemporary documents Jacme's name is spelled Jacme Scriva, without the accent. In modern Catalan orthography it is spelled Jaume Escrivà. His surname means "scribe".

He is named as the composer of a French ballade, Hoiés ores, mon Cuer, ce que vueil dire, listed among the ballades of Oton de Granson in the Cançoner Vega-Aguiló. That same chansonnier attributes an Occitan canso that is actually by Uc de Saint Circ, Tres enemics e dos mals seignors ai. The ascription in the same chansonnier of a song among Oton's may also be false. If the ascription is correct, it is probably to be connected with certain poetic contests being held in Paris late in the fourteenth century, which were known in Catalonia according to certain letters regarding the foundation of the Consistori de Barcelona. Either way, the ascription shows Jacme Scrivà to have been famous enough in the years 1420–30, when the Vega-Aguiló was copied, to be credited with original compositions in more than one non-native tongue.

The only known two pieces of Jacme's poetry in the Catalan language are preserved in the Cançoner de Saragossa. En be fort punt suy entrat en la setla is a cobla esparsa about the poet's insomnia due to love. Pus que demendat m'avets is a lesson on the technical aspects of writing, addressed to a lady. In fact it is all erotic double entendre. A single cobla from a lost poem of Jacme's is preserved in Lo conhort by Francesc Ferrer; it begins Amor, Amor, quisvulla us don lausor.
