= Linda Ivany =

American paleoecologist and paleoclimatologist

Academic background
- Education: Syracuse University; University of Florida; Harvard University
- Doctoral advisor: Stephen Jay Gould

Academic work
- Discipline: Paleoecology; Paleoclimatology
- Institutions: Syracuse University

Linda Ivany is a professor in the Earth Sciences department at Syracuse University. Her research focuses primarily on paleoecology and paleoclimatology.

== Education ==
Ivany completed a BS degree in Geology at Syracuse University, and then went on to earn an M.S. at the University of Florida, and a Ph.D. at Harvard University under the guidance of Stephen J. Gould.

== Career ==
She worked at the University of Michigan 1997 - 2000, before being hired as a visiting assistant professor at Syracuse University later in 2000. She was promoted to full professor in 2012.

== Research ==
She was involved in two seminal papers on large-scale diversity patterns in the Phanerozoic, in which the authors showed that it was very important to correct for the "completeness" of the fossil record, and showed that the increase in taxonomic diversity across the past 540 million years is not as dramatic as had been suggested by Jack Sepkoski and others.

She has also published several important studies that involve inferring past changes in global climate, especially in the Cenozoic.

Much of Ivany's research revolves around the study of fossil molluscs, including their taxonomy and analyses of stable isotope data.

In one recent study, she and her co-authors demonstrated a positive relationship between marine mollusc longevity and latitude.

As of November 2019, Ivany's publications had been cited more than 3600 times in the scientific literature.

A third major focus of her research involved quantifying a pattern of long intervals of assemblage similarity through time, punctuated by an abrupt shift in assemblage composition. This was referred to as "coordinated stasis." Coordinated stasis was sometimes thought of as a community-level analogue of Gould & Eldridge's Punctuated Equilibria. Although there were apparently substantial environmental changes during a 5.5Ma interval of "stasis" during the Devonian, which is consistent with some biotically driven community stability, Ivany and others caution against conceptually framing coordinated stasis as punctuated equilibra writ large.

== Awards ==
In April 2019, Ivany was presented with an Excellence in Graduate Education Faculty Recognition Award in celebration of her outstanding mentorship of graduate students.
