= José María Valverde =

Spanish poet and essayist

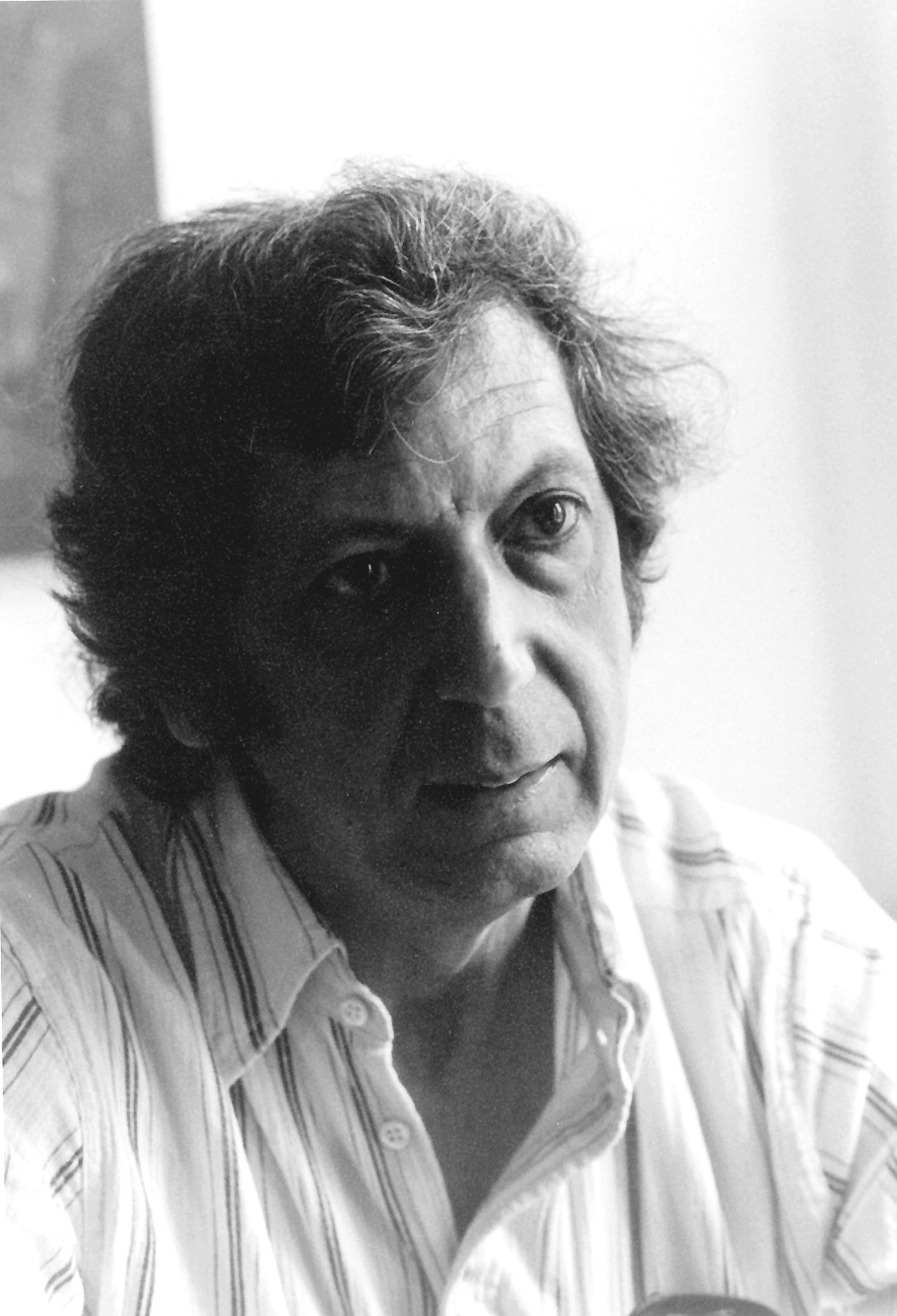
José María Valverde in 1980

José María Valverde Pacheco (26 January 1926, Valencia de Alcántara (Cáceres) – 6 June 1996, Barcelona) was a Spanish poet, essayist, literary critic, philosophy historian, and Spanish translator.
