= Antoni Canals =

Dominican friar

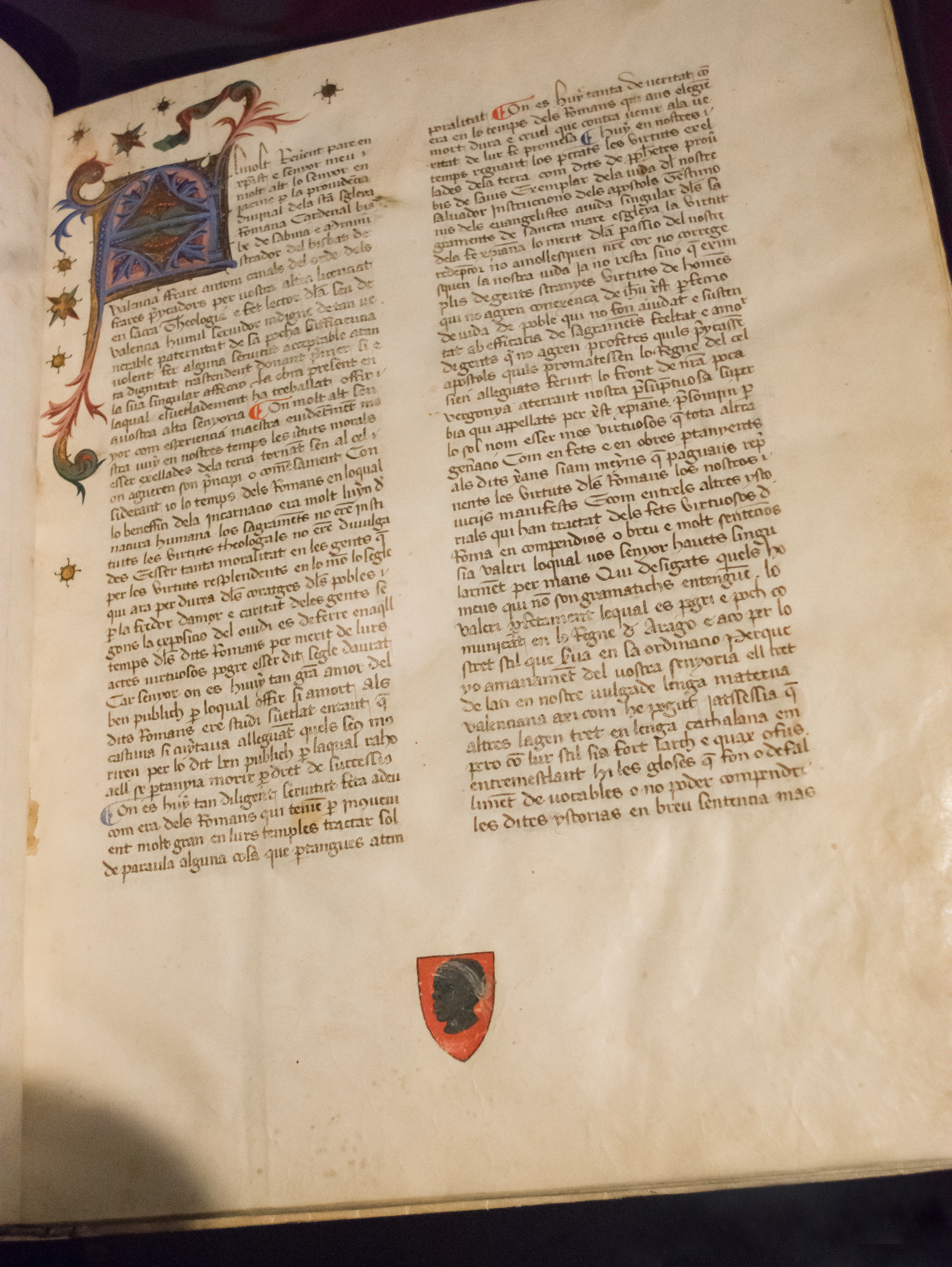
Dictorum factorumque memorabilium (1395-1415).

Antoni Canals (1352-1419) was a Dominican friar, orator and writer. He was born in the Kingdom of Valencia and he was famous for his sermons (even though unfortunately none of them has arrived to us) and by three translations or adaptations of classical works into Catalan.

He was disciple of Saint Vincent Ferrer, he taught theology in Valencia until 1398 and he was linked to the Royal Court, where he remained from 1398 until 1401, when he moved to Barcelona. When he came back to Valencia, he became the lieutenant of the kingdom's inquisitor from 1401 to 1419, when he died.

== Works ==
The main aim of his works is his apostolate. The humanist feature of Antoni Canals' works is limited to three works:

- Seneca's De providentia translation.
- Valerius Maximus' Dictorum factorumque memorabilium translation. He called that Llibre anomenat Valeri Màxim (Book called Valerius Maximus).
- His best humanist work: Raonament fet entre Scipió e Aníbal (Dialogue that was made between Scipio Africanus and Hannibal), which in fact is a free translation of the seventh book of Petrarch's Africa, with interpolations that are based on other authors.
