= Andreu Febrer =

Catalan soldier, courtier and poet

Start of Andreu's translation of Dante

Andreu Febrer i Callís (1370×1374 – 1437×1444) was a Catalan soldier, courtier and poet.

== Life ==
Andreu was born at Vic between 1370 and 1374 to a family of artisans. His father, Andreu Febrer, was born at Vic in 1352. His mother was Francisca Callís, probably a granddaughter of Barchinona Calis. Her family was associated with the estate of El Callís. Through their mothers, Andreu and the jurist Jaume Callís were second cousins.

Andreu is first attested in the service of King John I of Aragon in 1393. After John's death, he served his widow, Queen Yolanda, for a time. In 1398, he was a scribe in the court of King Martin the Humane. In 1398, he took part in the king's crusade in Barbary. He later served Martin I of Sicily as a chamberlain and served in the process against the rebel Artale Alagona. In 1418, Alfonso the Magnanimous appointed him castellan of Castello Ursino in Sicily. In 1419, he made him an algutzir (bailiff). In 1420, he took part in the invasion of Sardinia and Corsica. He subsequently served Alfonso as a diplomat. Between 1429 and 1437, Andreu was in Barcelona. In 1437, he left for Naples at the head of a company of 100 crossbowmen. A document of 1444 shows that by then he was dead. At the time of his death, he held the rank of knight.

== Work ==
Andreu wrote lyric poetry in Catalan. All of his lyric works seem to have been written before 1400. Fifteen poems ascribed to him are found in the Cançoner Vega-Aguiló. These are a sirventes, a Crusade song about the 1398 expedition, two praise poems addressed to the ladies of the court of the County of Cardona and the queen of Sicily (probably Maria) and eleven love poems addressed to an unidentified Na Beatriu ('Lady Beatrice'). He refers to Beatriu under the senhals Loindan' Amor and Passabeutats. He imitates the style of the troubadours Arnaut Daniel, Jaufre Rudel and Cerverí de Girona and his Catalan is somewhat artificial and archaizing, full of Occitanisms. Despite his close connections with Italy, the French influence on his poetry (e.g., Guillaume Machaut) is greater than the Italian.

The greatest Italian influence on Andreu was Dante Alighieri. He and his younger contemporary Bernat Hug de Rocabertí were the Catalan poets most influenced by Dante. In 1429 in Barcelona, Andreu translated Dante's Divine Comedy into Catalan. He maintained the terza rima. His was the first verse translation to appear, Enrique de Villena's prose translation into Spanish having been published in 1428. Andreu's translation was praised by the Marqués de Santillana, who had commissioned Villena. Andreu dedicated his work to Alfonso the Magnanimous. It is preserved in a single manuscript of the late 15th century formerly owned by the Conde-Duque de Olivares, now El Escorial, L.II.18.

=== Editions ===
- Martí de Riquer, ed. Poesies. Barcelona: Barcino, 1951.
- Raquel Parera, ed. La versió d'Andreu Febrer de la Commedia de Dante: estudi del manuscrit i edició de l'Infern, I–XI. Universitat Autònoma de Barcelona, Facultat de Filosofia i Lletres, 2006.
