= Guerau de Massanet =

Catalan nobleman and poet

Guerau de Massanet or Maçanet (Catalan pronunciation: [ɡəˈɾaw ðə məsəˈnɛt]) was a Catalan nobleman and poet of the early fifteenth century. He is known only from his writings and those of others. Johan Basset dedicated his Letovari to him, whom he called a friend from temps passat ("times passed").

== Biography ==
Massanet debated in a partimen with the lawyer Gabriel Ferruç whether it was preferable to resolve conflicts militarily or judicially. Unsurprisingly, Ferruç the lawyer argued the latter while Massanet, probably of the knightly class, defended the private war. The poem runs eighty-eight lines, with the incipit Amichs Garaus, en cuy fis prets s'agença. The debaters present the historian with many interesting allusions to contemporary events, but failing to resolve their dilemma they instead asked two others to judge their debate. Massanet nominated Johan d'Olivella, but had recently been named veguer of Tàrrega and could not. Ferruç' nominee, Jacme Ripoll, another lawyer, found in favour of the judicial resolution.

Massanet also wrote an dansa the begins Amors joy mi renovelha. Each verse ends with the refrain mirant la flor de l'ametlha (or amenlha, "watching the flower of the almond tree"). This poem is praised both by Martí de Riquer i Morera and Josep Romeu i Figueras for its beauty, delicacy, and originality. Though written in the language and style of the troubadours of the "classical epoch" (c.1160–1220) and infused with the sentiments of courtly love, it lacks the desperation and the rhetorical flourish associated with Catalan poets of the late Middle Ages. A reference to "Sancta Marcelha" in the fourth stanza is enough to indicate the poet's piety. The first lines of the second stanza goes like this:

Per fin'amors naix e fulha
dins lo meu cor una branca,
que de tot cossir me despulha
contemplant-vos, domna franca.

For noble love is born and blossoms
within my heart a branch,
that dispels all my sorrows from me
contemplating you, honest lady.
