= Martí de Riquer i Morera =

Spanish-Catalan literary historian

The Most Excellent Martí de Riquer i Morera 8th Count of Casa Dávalos
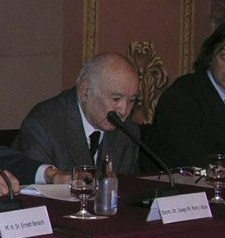
- Born: 3 May 1914; Barcelona, Spain
- Died: 17 September 2013 (aged 99); Barcelona, Spain
- Occupations: philologist; historian
- Awards: Creu de Sant Jordi

Seat H of the Real Academia Española
- In office 16 May 1965 – 17 September 2013
- Preceded by: Federico García Sanchiz
- Succeeded by: Félix de Azúa

Martí de Riquer i Morera, 8th Count of Casa Dávalos (Catalan pronunciation: [məɾˈti ðə riˈkej muˈɾeɾə], Spanish: Martín de Riquer y Morera) (3 May 1914 – 17 September 2013) was a Spanish literary historian and Romance philologist, a recognised international authority in the field. His writing career lasted from 1934 to 2004. He was also a nobleman and Grandee of Spain.

== Early life ==
Riquer was born in Barcelona in 1914, the grandson of Alexandre de Riquer i Ynglada, from whom he rehabilitated the noble title Count of Casa Dávalos in 1956, because it was in situation of expiry. He fought in the Spanish Civil War for the Nationalist side, in the Terç de Requetès de la Mare de Déu de Montserrat and later the propaganda service under Dionisio Ridruejo's direction.

In 1977, he was appointed a senator in the Cortes Constituyentes by the Spanish king Juan Carlos I. He was also appointed chief of the Romance literature section of the Consejo Superior de Investigaciones Científicas (CSIC, "Superior Council of Scientific Investigations").

== Scholarship and recognition ==
Riquer was a member of the Real Academia Española since 1965, president of the Real Academia de Buenas Letras de Barcelona, and corresponding member of numerous foreign institutions. He was the emeritus chair of Literaturas Románicas (Romance Literature) at the University of Barcelona, which he held from 1950 to 1984. He was viceroy of the university in 1965–6 and viceroy of the Autonomous University of Barcelona from 1970 to 1976. He is the founder and honorary president of the Sociedad Roncesvals, dedicated to the study of the chanson de geste and cantar de gesta.

Among the Romance languages Riquer studied were Occitan, French, Spanish, and Catalan. Specifically, he has written important and influential works on Don Quixote, the chansons de geste, the medieval novel (notably Amadis de Gaula), the troubadours, courtly love, the history of Catalan literature, and the social phenomenon of the knight-errant. He studied the influence of Ausiàs March, Juan Boscan, and the work of Miguel de Cervantes. Perhaps his most ambitious work was Historia de la Literatura Universal ("History of Universal Literature"), in collaboration José María Valverde. He and his disciple Albert Hauf were the most prominent authorities on courtly love in Spain in the late 20th and early 21st centuries.

Riquer was the recipient of many honours later in life. In 1962 he received the Premio March de Cataluña, in 1990 he received the fourth Menéndez Pelayo International Prize, in 1991 he received the Premio Nacional de Ensayo from the Ministry of Culture for his monograph Aproximació al Tirant lo Blanc, in 1997 he received the Premio Príncipe de Asturias de Ciencias Sociales, in 1999 he received the Premi Lletra d'Or for Quinze generacions d'una família catalana, and in 2000 he received the Premio Nacional de las Letras Españolas. He was elected to the American Philosophical Society in 1975. In 2005 he was made a Grandee of Spain by King Juan Carlos I. He received Doctor honoris causa degrees (honorary doctor) from the University of Rome and the University of Liège.

== Published works ==
=== His own ===
- L'humanisme català (1388–1494) Barcelona: Barcino, 1934.
- Humanisme i decadència en les lletres catalanes Barcelona: Revista de Catalunya, 1934.
- Comentaris crítics sobre clàssics catalans Barcelona: Barcino, 1935.
- Manual de heráldica española Barcelona: Apolo, 1942.
- La lírica de los trovadores Madrid: CSIC, 1948.
- Los cantares de gesta franceses, Madrid: Gredos, 1952.
- Historia de la literatura catalana, Barcelona: Ariel, 1964–1966.
- Historia de la literatura universal, Barcelona: Noguer, 1957–1959. (in collaboration with José María Valverde)
- Caballeros andantes españoles, Madrid: Espasa-Calpe, 1967.
- L'arnès del cavaller: armes i armadures catalanes medievals, Barcelona: Ariel, 1968.
- Cavalleria: fra realtà e letteratura nel Quattrocento, Bari: Adriatica, 1968.
- El combate imaginario: Las cartas de batalla de Joanot Martorell, Barcelona: Seix Barral, 1972. (in collaboration with Mario Vargas Llosa)
- Los trovadores, Barcelona: Planeta, 1975.
- Heràldica catalana des de l'any 1150 al 1550, Barcelona: Quaderns Crema, 1983.
- Vida i aventures de don Pero Maça, Barcelona: Quaderns Crema, 1984.
- Heráldica Castellana en tiempos de los Reyes Católicos, Quaderns Crema, 1986.
- Estudios sobre el Amadís de Gaula, Barcelona: Sirmio, 1987.
- Cervantes, Passamonte y Avellaneda, Barcelona: Sirmio, 1988.
- Cervantes en Barcelona, Barcelona: Sirmio, 1989.
- Aproximació al Tirant lo Blanc, Quaderns Crema, 1990
- Tirant lo Blanch, Novela de historia y de ficción, Barcelona: Sirmio, 1992.
- Les poesies del trobador Guillem de Berguedà, Barcelona: Quaderns Crema, 1996.
- Quinze generacions d'una família catalana, Barcelona: Quaderns Crema, 1998.
- Llegendes històriques catalanes, Barcelona: Quaderns Crema, 2000.
- Para leer a Cervantes, Barcelona: Acantilado, 2003.
- Vida y amores de los trovadores y sus damas, Barcelona: Acantilado, 2004.

=== Edited works ===
- Antoni Canals, Scipió e Anibal. De providència. De arra de ànima, Barcelona: Barcino, 1935.
- Jordi de Sant Jordi, Poesies, Barcelona: Catalònia, 1935.
- Bernatz de Ventadorn, Poesías, Barcelona: Yunque, 1940.
- Sebastián de Covarrubias, Tesoro de la lengua castellana o española, Barcelona: Horta, 1943.
- Miguel de Cervantes, Don Quijote de la Mancha, Barcelona: Juventud, 1944.
- Jacinto Verdaguer, L'Atlàntida, Barcelona: Ayuntamiento de Barcelona, 1946.
- Pero Martínez, Obras, Barcelona: CSIC, 1946.
- Cerverí de Girona, El trovador Cerverí de Girona, Barcelona: Universitat de Barcelona, 1946.
- Joanot Martorell, Martí Joan de Galba, Tirant lo Blanc, Barcelona: Selecta, 1947.
- Joanot Martorell, Martí Joan de Galba, Tirante el Blanco: traducción castellana de 1511, Barcelona: Asociación de Bibliófilos, 1947–1949.
- Andreu Febrer, Poesies, Barcelona: Barcino, 1951.
- Gilabert de Próixita, Poesies, Barcelona: Barcino, 1954.
- Juan Boscán, Obras poéticas, Barcelona: Facultat de Filosofia i Lletres, Universitat de Barcelona, 1957. (with Antoni Comas and Joaquim Moles)
- Guillem de Berguedà, Guillem de Berguedà, Espluga de Francolí: Abadia de Poblet, 1971.
- Alonso Fernández de Avellaneda, Don Quijote de la Mancha, Madrid: Espasa-Calpe, 1972.
- Fernando de Rojas, La celestina, Madrid: Alfaguara, 1974.
- Chrétien de Troyes, Li contes del graal, Madrid: Espasa-Calpe, 1961.
- Alan Chartier, La belle dame sans merci, Barcelona: Quaderns Crema, 1983.
- La chanson de Roland. El Cantar de Roldán y el Roncesvalles navarro, Barcelona: El Festín de Esopo, 1983.
- Arnaut Daniel, Poesías, Barcelona: Quaderns Crema, 1994.

== Notes ==
Spanish nobility
Preceded by Alexandre de Riquer	Count of Casa Dávalos; 11 June 1956 – 17 September 2013	Incumbent
Preceded by New creation	Grandee; 23 April 2005 – 17 September 2013	Incumbent
