= Jordi de Sant Jordi =

Valencian poet and knight

Jordi de Sant Jordi (Valencian pronunciation: [ˈdʒɔɾði ðe ˈsaɲ ˈdʒɔɾði]; late 1390s – c. 1424) was a Valencian poet and knight. Along with his contemporary Ausiàs March, Sant Jordi was among the earliest and most representative figures of the so-called Valencian Golden Age, one of the peak periods of the Valencian literature. He was patronised by Queen-Dowager Margarida of Aragon-Prades, widow of King Martí I.

Sant Jordi was born in the Kingdom of Valencia, the son of a freed morisco slave. He was Chamberlain at the court of King Alfons V of Aragon (Alfons III of Valencia) but he is best known for his poetry.

Sant Jordi took part in King Alfonso's expedition to the Kingdom of Naples, where he was captured by the forces of Francesco Sforza on 30 May 1423. During his captivity, he wrote one of his best-known poems, 'Prisoner'.

He died around 1424. Among later writers who appear to draw from his work is Joan Roís de Corella. Iñigo López de Mendoza's work The Coronation of Lord Jordi is dedicated to him.
