= Lisa de Londres =

Composer in Old Occitan

Lisa de Londres (fl. c. 1220–1250) was a trobairitz, a female composer in Old Occitan. Her work is known only from three lines quoted in Italian translation in the Reggimento e costumi di donna of Francesco da Barberino (died 1348), who also mentions her in his Documenti d'amore. The three lines are:

Madonna Lisa di Londres disse:
che debole era il cuor di quella donna
che, per vana laude e per vana vista,
dava onore altrui del suo dispregio.

Translation:

M'lady Lisa di Londres said:
that weak was the heart of that woman
who, for vain praise and a false perspective,
gave honour to others, bringing contempt on herself.

It is unclear what kind of poem the three lines are taken from, perhaps a tenso, an ensenhamen or a cobla esparsa. In a tenso with Hugolin de Forcalquier, the Comtessa de Dia seems to allude to this poem by Lisa. In the Commentario of his Documenti, Barberino gives a Latin summary of a six-stanza tenso between Lisa (now called domina Lysa) and Felip Engles on courtly love. From the Latin summaries alone, the work appears "masterful" (meisterliche), according to Angelica Rieger.

Saverio Guida and Gerardo Larghi tentatively identified Lisa with Salvatja de Londra, who judged a partimen between Lanfranc Cigala and Lantelm. Antoine Thomas suggested that Lisa was the same person as Auliane de Anglia, mentioned elsewhere by Barberino.

"Londres" has sometimes been taken to refer to London (as in Friedrich Christian Diez), partially on the basis that her interlocutor's name, Felip Engles, means "Philip the Englishman". It more likely refers to a place in southern France. Locations in Hérault, Gard, Bouches-du-Rhône and Lot-et-Garonne have been suggested. Rieger opts for Saint-Martin-de-Londres.

== Bibliography ==
- Guida, Saverio; Larghi, Gerardo (2014). Dizionario biografi co dei trovatori. Mucchi.
- Barberino, Francesco de (1842). Guglielmo Manzi (ed.). Del reggimento e de costumi delle donne. Giovanni Silvestri.
- Nappholz, Carol Jane (1994). Unsung Women: The Anonymous Female-voice in Troubadour Poetry. Peter Lang.
- Ortiz, Ramiro (1904). "Il 'Reggimento' del Barberino ne' suoi rapporti colla letteratura didattico-morale degli 'ensenhamens'". Zeitschrift für romanische Philologie. 28 (6): 649–675. doi:10.1515/zrph.1904.28.6.649. S2CID 162843410.
- Paden, William D. (2018). "The Lives of the Troubadours: A New Biographical Dictionary". Romance Philology. 72 (1): 111–124. doi:10.1484/J.RPH.5.115124.
- Parenti, Marco Antonio, ed. (1826). Scelta di novelle antiche. Modena.
- Rieger, Angelica (1991). Trobairitz: Der Beitrag der Frau in der altokzitanischen höfischen Lyrik. Edition des Gesamtkorpus. Max Niemeyer Verlag. doi:10.1515/9783110933413. ISBN 978-3-484-52233-6.
- Thomas, Antoine (1883). Francesco da Barberino et la litterature provençale au moyen âge. Ernest Thorin.
