= Falquet de Romans =

Italian troubadour

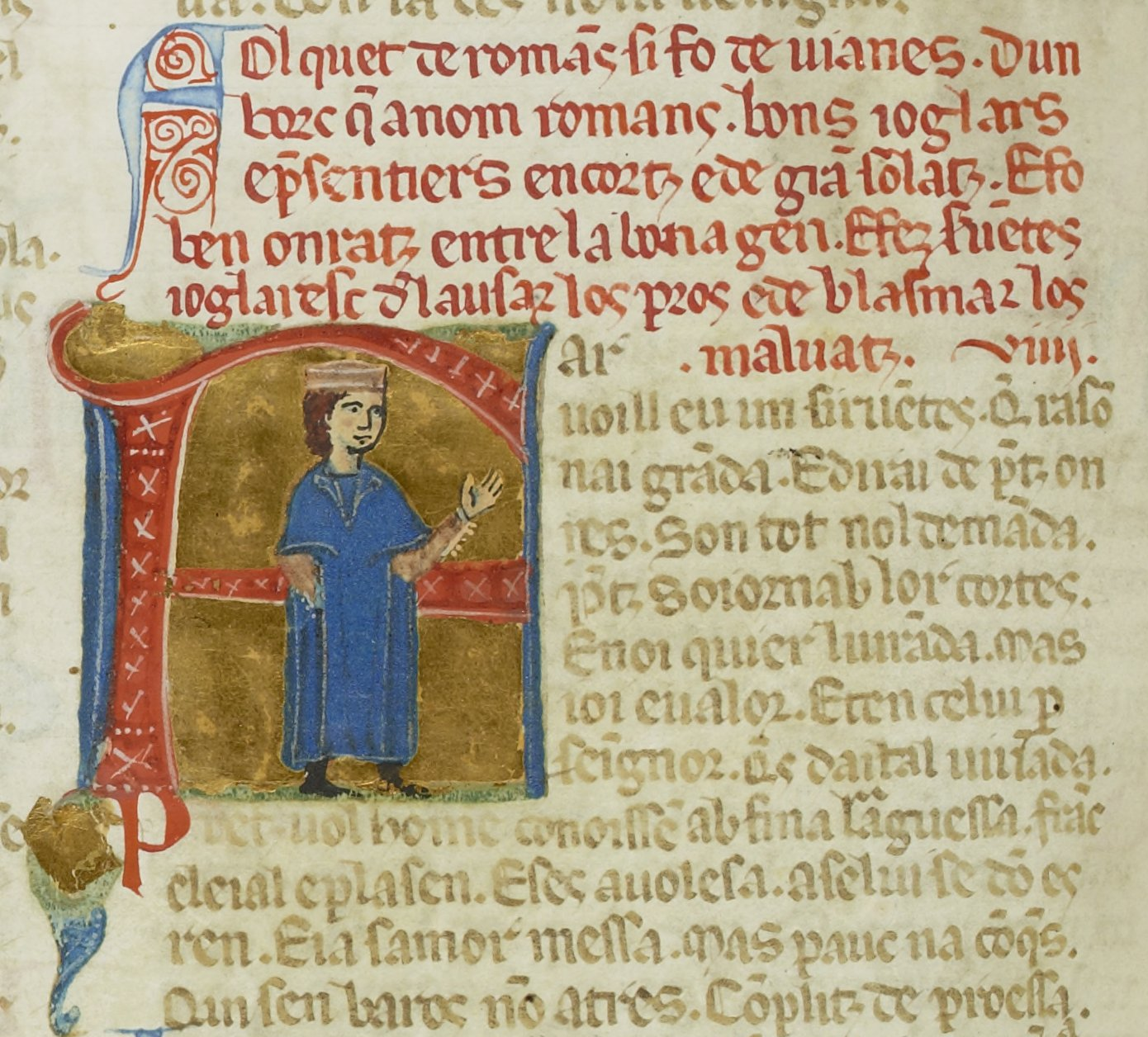
A miniature of Falquet below his vida (red text)

Falquet (or Folquet) de Romans (fl. 1215–1233) was the most famous troubadour attached to the court of Frederick II, Holy Roman Emperor, where he garnered a high reputation despite the fact that his career began as a jongleur. His surviving work consists of fourteen or fifteen pieces: seven sirventes (two religious and two canso sirventes as well as one Crusade song), three tensos (each two coblas long), two or three cansos on courtly love, a salut d'amor (or epistola) of 254 lines, and a religious alba. His poetry is, in general, clear and elegant, and he was apparently very religious.

Falquet was originally from Romans d'Isèra, a birthplace shared by the trobairitz Bieiris de Romans. According to his vida he was "at ease in the courts and of pleasant conversation. . . well-honoured among high society."

== Career in Italy and Provence ==
Falquet spent much of his career in Italy. Sometime before December 1220, he wrote the homesick Una chanso sirventes from Montferrat and addressed it to his lady across the Alps. He confessed to being unable to cease thinking pus parti de Vianes ("the greater part about Viennois"). Besides the court of Montferrat, there are allusions in Peire de la Mula which may place Falquet at the court of Ottone del Carretto as well. It was probably there, between 1220 and 1226, that he wrote his sirventes urging the emperor to "rescue" the Holy Land.

Falquet was in communication with the trouvère Hugues IV de Berzé (N'Ugo de Bersie) who wrote a poem to Falquet (calling him Fouquet or Fouquez) asking him to join him on an imminent Crusade outra mar (overseas). Hugues's poem was sent with the jongleur Bernart (or Bernarz) d'Argentau. It is rife with information about the poets. According to Hugues, neither he nor Falquet were young at the time. Indeed, he was dead by August 1220, which provides an ante quem date for the poem. Hugues also states that Falquet had once been a jongleur, a detail also furnished by Falquet's vida. Though the poetic exchange had been dated to 1201 or November 1220–September 1221, the former date is too early and the latter invalidated by Hugues's death. Recently, dates of 1215, 1216, 1217, and 1219 have been proffered. Hugue's poem, written in Old French, is preserved in the chansonniers with an Occitan razo.

Falquet was back in Provence in 1226–1228, when he wrote a tenso, En chantan volh quem digatz, with Blacatz. This is the only tenso he composed outside of Italy, where he composed with Nicoletto da Torino (Nicolet, gran malenansa) and the Count of Biandrate (Pois vezem qu'el tond e pela). In 1228, Falquet composed an additional song encouraging Frederick II to depart on the Sixth Crusade.

== Poetry ==
Connection to chivalric romance

Falquet was very learned and well-read. References to contemporary literature (primarily chivalric romance) abound in his poetry. In his Ma bella domna, per vos dei esser gais he references Floire et Blancheflor (the former whom he calls Flori), the Roman d'Andrieu de Fransa, and the Raoul de Cambrai. On two other occasions he was given to referencing Floire et Blancheflor and in his 254-line letter he refers to the Roman de Renart and Tristans and Ysout. Elsewhere he refers to the latter as Tristanz and Ysolt.

Religion

In total, Falquet composed three religious songs, two sirventes, and one famous alba. This last, Vers Dieu, el vostre nom e de Sancta Maria, was addressed to God and the Virgin Mary. It ends on the high note of a sunrise (alba):

La nuech vai e.l jorns ve ab clar cel e sere, e l'alba no.s rete ans ven belh'e complia.	The night goes and the day comes to a clear sky and serene, and the sunrise does not hold back before becoming beautiful and complete.

Politics

Of Falquet's political views very little would be known if he had not left behind a sirventes written against the rich and powerful which contains a prescription for socio-political reform:

Ben volgr'aguessem un senhor ab tan de poder e d'albir qu'als avols tolges la ricor e no.ls laisses terra tenir, e dones l'eretatge a tal que fos pros e prezatz qu'aissi fo.l segles comensatz, e no.i gardes linhatge, e mudes om los rics malvatz, cum fan lombart las poestatz.	I wish we had a lord with so much power and judgement that from the base he took their riches and did not leave them land to hold, and gave their heritage to the worthy and admired that thus the world began, and not respecting lineage,. . .. . .

Besides this one clear statement, Falquet composed other sirventes joglarescs (attacks/insult on jongleurs, often in the manner of jongleurs) in order, so his vida puts it, "to praise the good and to blame the bad."

Crusades

In the early 1220s Falquet had urged the emperor his patron to go on Crusade and in 1228 he mentioned his departure. In between he wrote Quan lo dous temps ven e vai la freidors, one of the most powerful Crusade songs ever written. The central theme of the work is the tumult of Europe engulfed in a conflict between the Papacy and the Emperor and the Albigensian Crusade.
