= Azalais d'Altier =

Occitan trobairitz

Azalais or Azalaïs d'Altier was an early-13th-century trobairitz. She was from Altier in the Gévaudan. She has sometimes been confused with Almucs de Castelnau.

Azalais wrote "Tanz salutz e tantas amors", the only salut d'amor by a woman. It comprises 101 verses of rhyming couplets. Its purpose was to reconcile two lovers, and it was addressed to a woman, possibly Clara d'Anduza. Its similarity in tone to Clara's canso "En greu esmay et en greu pessamen" gives the impression that it may have been written in response. Azalais was well known in troubadour circles, for Uc de Saint-Circ addressed his "Anc mais non vi temps ni sazo" to her in its tornada. Nonetheless, the great troubadour ignored her when composing the vidas.

Azalais herself was a woman of learning, and she must have been familiar with the Matter of Rome through the Roman de Troie of Benoît de Sainte-Maure, which she references in her salut:

| Brizeida, (Note: Brizeida is also spelled Briseida or Breseida. It is the Occitan name of Briseis, the Cressida of later medieval invention.) qar ilh for cangiare sos cors, qar laiset Troilus' per amar lo fil Tideus. | Cressida, because she was inconstant of heart, left Troilus to love Tydeus' son. |

There is today a street named "Rue Azalais d'Altier" in Montpellier.

== Sources ==
- Bruckner, Matilda Tomaryn. "The Trobairitz" in: A Handbook of the Troubadours, edd. F. R. P. Akehurst and Judith M. Davis. Berkeley: University of California Press, 1995. ISBN 0-520-07976-0.
- Bruckner, Matilda Tomaryn; Shepard, Laurie; and White, Sarah. Songs of the Women Troubadours. New York: Garland Publishing, 1995. ISBN 0-8153-0817-5.
- Klinck, Anne Lingard; Rasmussen, Ann Marie. Medieval Woman's Song: Cross-Cultural Approaches. Pittsburg: University of Pennsylvania Press, 2002. ISBN 0-8122-3624-6.
