= Tribolet (disambiguation) =

Tribolet can refer to:

- Tribolet, an obscure troubadour, known only for one song
- José Tribolet (b. 1949), Portuguese computer scientist
- Louis de Tribolet, Swiss Olympic fencer
