= Luca Grimaldi =

Italian composer

Luca Grimaldi (fl. 1240–1275) was a Genoese troubadour and Guelph politician and diplomat. None of his poetic work survives.

Jean de Nostredame listed one Luco ou Lucas de Grymaud, natif de Grymauld en Provence as a Provençal troubadour, and speculated that his birthplace may also have been Gennes. However, it is more probable that he was of the Grimaldi family of Genoa. He was once identified with a Luchetto Grimaldi from the same period, but a medieval document, Liber Jurium Januae, mentions both a Luca and a Luchetto de Grimaldo.

The first mention of a Luca Grimaldi is in a document formalising the alliance between Genoa and Milan against the Emperor Frederick II in 1240. There was a Luca, son of Grimaldo de Grimaldi, who was the brother of Bovarello, the Genoese ambassador to Charles I of Provence in 1252. This was probably the troubadour, not to be confused with another Luca Grimaldi, son of one Ugo and first cousin of the poet, who was podestà of Florence in 1257. In 1255, a certain Luca Grimaldi married his daughter Alasina to Pasqualino Usodimare, who promised not to consummate the marriage until she was twelve. It is not known if this was the troubadour or his cousin.

In 1242 Luca Grimaldi appears as podestà of Milan. By 1253 he had returned to Genoa, where he appears in several acts of the podestà along with Alberto Fieschi. In that year he purchased a precious throne from the cash-strapped Conrad IV; he re-sold it to Manfred a few years later. In 1258 he was sent as an ambassador of Genoa to the court of Pope Alexander IV and in 1262 he was elected, along with fellow troubadour Jacme Grils and other citizens, as rector of the city. Luca Grimaldi was also familiar with the troubadours Simon Doria and Luchetto Gattilusio, beside both of whom he appears in a document of 1267. In 1269 Luca and his brother Bovarello were charged by Charles of Provence, now King of Naples, with receiving the ambassadors of the "Sultan of Babylonia", actually the Abbasid caliph then in Cairo, Al-Hakim I, in Genoa.

Luca Grimaldi was ever a Guelph at heart. In 1271 he was elected podestà in Ventimiglia and he spent his term there working for the Guelph cause. The Ghibellines in Genoa, however, rebelled, and, on 28 October 1271, in a major battle, the Guelphs were defeated and many were captured, including Luca Grimaldi, who was imprisoned for twenty three years. He had died by 18 April 1275, when a Genoese document refers to him and his brother Bovarello as dead. Nostradamus dated his death to 1308, but this is certainly wrong.

== Sources ==
- Bertoni, Giulio (1915). I Trovatori d'Italia: Biografie, testi, tradizioni, note. Rome: Società Multigrafica Editrice Somu.
- Hughes, Daine Owen. "Urban Growth and Family Structure in Medieval Genoa." Past and Present, No. 66. (Feb., 1975), pp. 3–28.
- Cronologia di Firenze
- Cronologia di Milano dal 1226 al 1250
