= Gormonda de Monpeslier =

- Origin: Montpellier, France
- Occupation: Trobairitz
- Years active: 1226–1229

Na Gormonda de Monpeslier or Montpelher (fl. 1226–1229) was a trobairitz from Montpellier in Languedoc. Her lone surviving work, a sirventes, has been called "the first French political poem by a woman."

She wrote a response, Greu m'es a durar, to the famous anti-papal sirventes of Guilhem Figueira, following Figueira's poem in metre and rhyme for about twenty stanzas. Instead of blaming the papal legate Pelagius of Albano for the failure of the Fifth Crusade, she laid the blame on the "foolishness" of the wicked. She went on to justify the Crusade against the heretics at home on the grounds that the heresy was more dangerous than Islam and the heretics had falser hearts. Finally, she expressed a desire to see Figueira tortured to death. Her poem fell well within the bounds of orthodox piety and her position, far from being radical, was that of the Church as expressed by Pope Innocent III and contemporary troubadour Lanfranc Cigala.

Though nothing is known of Gormonda save what can be confidently gleaned from her sirventes, it seems plausible that she was associated closely with the orthodox clergy of southern France and had sympathies for the Papacy and the French monarchy. She was possibly a Dominican.

== Sources ==
- Bruckner, Matilda Tomaryn. "Fictions of the Female Voice: The Women Troubadours." Speculum, Vol. 67, No. 4. (Oct., 1992), pp. 865–891.
- Chambers, Frank M. "Imitation of Form in the Old Provençal Lyric." Romance Philology, 6 (1952/1953), pp. 104–121.
- Städtler, Katharina. "The Sirventes by Gormonda de Monpeslier." The Voice of the Trobairitz: Perspectives on the Women Troubadours. William D. Paden, ed. Philadelphia: University of Pennsylvania Press, 1989.
- Throop, Palmer A. "Criticism of Papal Crusade Policy in Old French and Provençal." Speculum, Vol. 13, No. 4. (Oct., 1938), pp. 379–412.
