= Salut d'Amour (disambiguation) =

Salut d'Amour may refer to:

- Salut d'amor, an Occitan lyric genre
- Salut d'Amour, a musical piece by the English composer Edward Elgar
- Salut d'Amour (TV series), a South Korean television series broadcast in 1994–5
- Salut d'Amour (film), a 2015 South Korean film
