= Ottone del Carretto =

Italian noble

- Died: 1237×42
- Title: Margrave of Savona (c. 1185–91)
- Spouse: Alda (possibly)
- Children: Ugo (Hugh); Enrico (Henry); Manfredo (Manfred)

Ottone del Carretto (died 1237×42), a patron of troubadours and an imperialist, was the margrave of Savona (c.1185–91) and podestà of the Republic of Genoa (1194–95) and of Asti (1212). He was the founder of the Del Carretto family.

== Childhood ==
The earliest record of Ottone dates to 1179, when he subscribed with his younger brother, Enrico (II), to the charter of their father, Enrico Guercio, whereby the commune of Savona was granted fiscal and judicial independence. In 1181, the brothers again subscribed their father's chatter, this time granting the commune of Noli the right to hold a market and to fortify itself, in return for the commune's recognition of the marquis's suzerainty, including the right to fodder and the ban.

The same year (1181), Ottone, still a minor, witnessed the treaty between Manfred II of Saluzzo, his relative, and the commune of Alba. As a result of this agreement, Manfred released some merchants of Alba whom he had been holding hostage.

== Career ==
=== Inheritance ===
The first act of Ottone and Enrico after they had come of age was to swear to the Compagna of the Republic of Genoa, on 20 July 1182, that they would reside in the city for three months of the year during time of war and for one month a year during peacetime. After the death of Enrico Guercio, between 1184 and 1186, the brothers divided their inheritance. Whether this was in accordance with their father's testament or of their own accord is unclear. Both brothers held the title "margrave (marchio) of Savona".

Ottone, as the elder brother, took Savona, the lordships of Albisola and Quiliano and the castles of Cairo, Dego and Cortemiglia. These villages lay on the road from coastal Savona to the subalpine Langhe. The cities of Savona and Noli were now largely independent of seignorial authority, and in the former the family's power was wielded most effectively by the bishop, Ambrogio, another younger brother of Ottone.

=== Loss of Savona ===
On 10 April 1191 Ottone sold to the commune of Savona all his banal rights and patrimony in the city's territory—except the castellanies of Quiliano and Albisola, the latter being a fief of William V of Montferrat—for 1,500 lire of Genoa. The independence of Savona was confirmed by a diploma of the Emperor Henry VI on 18 November. The margrave continued to be influential in the city, however. In 1193, Ambrogio died and the cathedral elected another brother, Boniface, to replace him. In 1202, Ottone's son Ugo (Hugh) served a term as podestà of Savona.

Ottone now resided mostly in Carretto, a castle near Cairo. From this he began to take the name "de Carreto" in documents, replacing the usage of "margrave of Savona". On 22 November 1192, he completed the process begun the previous year and sold Quiliano and his rights in Albisola to Savona for 5,000 Genoese lire. The next year (1193), Ottone's wife, Alda, a daughter of the Crusader lord Hugh III of Giblet of the Embriaco family, appears in the record for the first time when she ratified the sale of Quiliano and Albisola.

From the sale of his rights in Savona and his control of the trade route from the city to the mountains, Ottone gained enormous wealth. He turned his court into a centre of culture, capable of competing with that of the margraves of Montferrat, and he patronised Occitan poets. (Note: Occitan was the vernacular "prestige" language for lyric poetry at the time.) His patrimony served as a "buffer state" between the margraviate of Montferrat and the nascent subalpine communes, like Alba and Asti. This placed him at the centre of the regional diplomatic web, and he had good relations with Asti, Genoa and Montferrat.

=== Alliance with Montferrat ===
In 1194 Ottone joined Boniface I of Montferrat and the Republic of Genoa in aiding Henry VI in his conquest of Sicily, which he claimed in right of his wife, Constance. Ottone, in accordance with his oath of 1182, was staying in Genoa when the podestà, Oberto di Olevano, died of a fever. Ottone was chosen to succeed him in an impromptu election, where legal forms were not followed. Henry VI had promised Genoa as a reward for its services Syracuse and the Val di Noto in Sicily, but he used the illegality of Ottone's election as an excuse to not hand over the territories. The next year (1195), the Genoese chose a man from Milan to replace Ottone as podestà.

In 1196 Ottone witnessed the act of infeudation by which Manfredi Lancia was enfeoffed to Boniface of Montferrat.

When war broke out in 1198 between Montferrat and the allied communes of Asti and Alessandria, Ottone and his brother Enrico joined Boniface and served guarantors for his alliance with the commune of Ivrea. In 1199 he stood as a witness to the treaty of peace signed at San Germano in the Casalese between Boniface and the communes of Asti, Alessandria and Vercelli. He took from Alessandria the castle of Montechiaro. Later that year, in August, he witnessed the peace treaty between Manfredi Lancia and the commune of Alba. In 1200, he witnessed the act whereby the lords of Manzano gave their castle to Alba.

After Boniface of Montferrat left on the Fourth Crusade, Ottone entered into an alliance with Alba. In March 1202 he signed an agreement with Alessandria whereby he would buy land in the city and contribute soldiers to its militia. The commune committed to preventing the formation of an independent town between Bestagno and Santo Stefano. In 1203 Alba and Alessandria agreed to renounce armed intervention against Ottone or his brother Enrico. In 1204, Ottone and Enrico joined William VI of Montferrat, the Del Vasto family, the commune of Alba and the seignorial league of the Astisio (Note: The Astisio was the region around Asti.) in a grand alliance against the communes of Asti and Cuneo.

=== Alliance with Asti and Genoa ===
On 6 July 1209 Ottone reached an understanding with Asti. He ceded the commune all his possessions in the Po Valley—including Castano, Cortemiglia, Torre di Bormida and Torre Uzzone—for 1,000 Genoese lire and received them back as fiefs: "as a military and hereditary fief" (in rectum et gentile feudum) in the words of the charter. As a result of this treaty, Ottone was forced to close the highway passing through this territory to merchants from Alba. In 1210 Ottone was a witness to the imperial privileges granted to Asti by the Emperor Otto IV during his stay there. Ottone followed the imperial court to Turin, where he witnessed an imperial diploma in favour of the monastery of Casanova.

When conflict broke out between Otto IV and the heir of Henry VI, Frederick Roger, Ottone followed Asti in siding with Frederick. In 1212 he was elected podestà of Asti. After leaving office, Ottone, with the agreement of his son Ugo, ceded to Genoa the castles of Cairo and Dego and half of the castle of Carcare, among other places, with all their banal rights, and agreed to respect the alliances the city had made. He promptly received the castles back as fiefs: "so-called military and hereditary fiefs" (nomine recti et gentilis feudi) in the words of the charter. The chief purpose of Ottone's friendship to the citie of Asti and Genoa was to keep the trade route that passed through his territory open and to maintain a good link with the powerful margraves of Montferrat. In 1217 Ottone secured the passage of Asti's goods to Savona, and in 1218 he swore an oath to the latter city that he would own a house there and recruit men for service in the commune.

In 1219 Ottone witnessed the treaty of alliance between Manfred III of Saluzzo and Asti. When the town of Ventimiglia rebelled against Genoa that same year, Ottone and his brother Enrico joined the Genoese army that besieged the rebellious town. On 22 November 1220 Ottone attended the imperial coronation of Frederick in Rome. In response to Genoa's pleas, Frederick confirmed their lordship over Ventimiglia and charged Ottone with imposing the same. After his envoys to Ventimiglia were jailed, Ottone pronounced the imperial ban on the city, prohibiting any other imperial subject from coming to its aid.

Ottone's only break with Genoa came shortly after this. Genoa had arbitrated a dispute over the castle of Pareto between Enrico di Ussecio and Ottone del Bosco (Note: A charter of 1228 suggests he was a member of the Del Vasto feudal network.) in favour of Enrico. Ottone's son Ugo, related to the Del Bosco family, occupied Pareto with the support of his father. Enrico responded by selling the castle to Genoa. The republic's army failed to take the castle in its first expedition, but its second succeeded. Ottone was forced to go to Genoa and renew his oath to the republic and confirm the cession of Dego and Cairo. When Genoese men came to possess these last two places, Ugo put up resistance and was again defeated. Ottone was forced to pay compensation to the republic.

In 1224 Ottone witnessed a new treaty between Manfred III of Saluzzo and Asti. In 1225 he witnessed a treaty between his brother Enrico and Asti. In that year war broke out between the Asti–Genoa alliance on the one hand and the other communes of the Po Valley on the other. Ottone and Enrico joined the Genoese army going to Asti's defence at Gavi Ligure. There Ottone renewed his treaty of 1209 with Asti, securing his continued control of the trade routes. In 1226 he and Enrico promised to recognise the treaty between Genoa and the emperor. When Frederick II came to Italy in 1227, the communes of the Po Valley rose in revolt against Genoa, hoping for imperial assistance. Enrico joined the revolt, while Ottone joined the Genoese army sent to the Riviera di Ponente to put down the revolt. He was present when the castle of Stella was surrendered. He was also at Savona in May when Enrico was forced to surrender. That same year he stood as guarantor to Boniface II of Montferrat for the alliance of Genoa and Asti in an effort to prevent Alessandrian expansion.

In August 1228 Ottone witnessed a military treaty between Genoa and Asti. In November he swore before the two communes and the members of the Del Vasto network that he would close his highway to merchants from Alessandria and Alba and not make a separate peace with either commune.

=== Final years ===
Ottone's final years were spent mostly on internal affairs, but he maintained his contacts with Asti and the emperor. Within his own fiefs, he converted the myriad obligations of the inhabitants of the towns and villages into annual rents. In November 1233 he renounced his rights at Cortemiglia to fodder and to the goods of those who died intestate (ab intestato) in exchange for an annual rent. The same exchange was made in Cairo in light of the town's "weakness, vulnerability and poverty" (debilitatem, passibilitatem et paupertatem).

About 1234 the Emperor Frederick II granted an imperial vicariate to Ottone, although the exact nature of this appointment is unknown. Ottone, acting as vicar, did grant to a certain Guglielmo Piloso di Santa Vittoria the right to impose a toll on the road that passed through his domains.

In 1235 Ottone sold his rights at Dego to a certain Giovanni Embriaco for 500 Genoese lire. That same year the monastery of San Pietro di Mesema challenged his sale of rights in Cairo in 1233, claiming that certain lands and the tithes collected in the territory, which earlier in 1235 Ottone had confirmed to the people of Cairo, belonged to the monastery. Finally, that year the Hospitaller priory of Lombardy claimed the tithes of Rocchetta in Ottone's domain belonged to them. The case was referred to Ugo, schoolmaster (magiscola) of the cathedral of Genoa.

Ottone's last recorded act was to arbitrate a dispute between the commune of Asti and the lords of Calamandrana and Canelli in 1237. The date of his death is not recorded, but it must have been in or before 1242. His eldest son, Ugo (Hugh), was the podestà of Savnoa in 1202, of Asti in 1212 and 1225 and of Alba in 1217. He predeceased his father in 1228. His second son, Enrico (Henry), married Beatrice, daughter of Boniface I of Montferrat. (Note: She is called Bel Cavalher (Fair Knight) in some songs of Raimbaut de Vaqueiras composed in the 1190s.) A third son, Manfredo (Manfred), is only attested in one document of 1242 in the Codex Astensis.

== Patronage of troubadours ==
Ottone was a patron of several troubadours, composers of Old Occitan lyric poetry. He is prominent in the vida (short vernacular biography) of Peire de la Mula. In one manuscript his name is given as miser N'Ot del Carret ("mister Lord Otto of Carretto"), in another as messer Ot del Caret, without the title "lord" (Occitan en or n′). There are allusions in the work of Peire de la Mula that may place Falquet de Romans at the court of Ottone del Carretto also. It was probably there, between 1220 and 1226, that Falquet wrote a sirventes urging the emperor to "rescue" the Holy Land. The charter of Ottone dated November 1233 was witnessed by one "Guillelmus de la Turri", possibly the same person as the troubadour Guilhem de la Tor. Palaizi and Bernart de Bondeills may also have stayed at Ottone's court. The troubadours were unanimous in praising their host as brave and generous.

== Sources ==
- Negri, Antonella (2006). Le liriche del trovatore Guilhem de la Tor. Rubbettino Editore.
- Nuti, Giovanni (1988). "Del Carretto, Ottone, marchese di Savona". Dizionario Biografico degli Italiani, Volume 36: De Fornari–Della Fonte (in Italian). Rome: Istituto dell'Enciclopedia Italiana. ISBN 978-8-81200032-6.
