= Peire de la Mula =

Italian troubadour

Peire (or Pietro) de la Mula (fl. c. 1200) was an Italian troubadour. Of his writings a pair of couplets and one sirventes are all that survive. According to his vida, he was a joglars and trobaire (troubadour) who stayed for a long time in Montferrat, Cortemilia, and the Piedmont at the court of Ottone del Carretto (fl. 1190–1233). This places Peire's activity before 1209, when Ottone lost Cortemilia.

It has been suggested that Peire's surname could be a misreading of de Lamula, as there are several places called Lamula are known, or of da Lama. It may instead be a corruption of de l'Amola, indicating origins in Amola, a town in Frignano. There did exist in the High Middle Ages a locale called Mulum southeast of Mantua and which may be the basis for a "Mula" family name, though evidence for this is lacking in other sources. There was also a poet named only "Mola" who exchanged some verses with Guilhem Raimon. He may be the same individual as Peire de la Mula, but he has also been identified with the joglars Tremoleta.

One of Peire's surviving couplets, Ia de razon no.m cal metr'en pantais, can be dated to before 1185 on the basis of a reference to Androin(e), that is, Andronicus I Comnenus, who died that year. It was a screed against the young and rich. Peire's other couplet, Una leig vei d'escuoill, was also an attack on minstrels (joglars), who, at his time, were bringing their "insolence" from across the Alps into the presence of the pros (powerful) of Italy. Peire refers in this work to both Breton (Bretz) and Norman (Normans) minstrels.

Peire's only full-length work to survive, Dels joglars servir mi laisse, is a sirventes joglaresc, a sirventes insulting the minstrels (joglars), whom Peire says are "breeding like leverets". Minstrels (mere performers) are in the business for money, but troubadours (composers), in Peire's view, are honorable. For his sirventes Peire imitated the metre of Raimbaut d'Aurenga's Er quant s'emba.l foill del fraisse. Otherwise, Peire was influenced metrically and rhythmically by the works of Giraut de Bornelh.

== Sources ==
- Bertoni, Giulio. I Trovatori d'Italia: Biografie, testi, tradizioni, note. Rome: Società Multigrafica Editrice Somu, 1967 [1915].
- Riquer, Martín de. Los trovadores: historia literaria y textos. 3 vol. Barcelona: Planeta, 1975.
- The Vidas of the Troubadours. Margarita Egan, trans. New York: Garland, 1984. ISBN 0-8240-9437-9.
