= Marco da Saliceto =

Marco da Saliceto (c. 1245 – after 1297) was an Italian notary and administrator from Bologna, who served as a tutor of the future monarch Andrew III of Hungary. Some scholars identified him with Marco Lombardo, a character in Dante's Purgatorio.

== Early life ==
Marco da Saliceto was born around 1245 in Bologna, as the son of Simone di Taccone da Saliceto. Italian historian Francesco Filippini considered that Simone is identical to that Simone di Domenico di Taccone, who was registered among the notaries public of Bologna in 1259. It is uncertain whether Marco originated from the same Saliceto family, members of the local ancient Guelph nobility, which produced famous legal experts, for instance, Bartolomeo da Saliceto. It is plausible that Marco came from a lower social status and his family moved to Bologna from Saliceto only in the 13th century. Marco had two sons from his unidentified wife, Mattiolo and Giovanni. Marco had a brother Matteo, father of two sons, Cristoforo and Alle. The family lived in the street Borgo della Paglia (present-day via delle Belle Arti), which then belonged to the jurisdiction of the San Martino dell'Aposa parish church.

Marco first appears in contemporary records in December 1265, when, after passing the notary exam, he was ceremonially installed among the notaries public of Bologna in the presence of podestà Guido da Montecchio. Several members of the family became notaires, six of Marco's relatives functioned in this position by 1294 too. Marco was drafted in the municipal army and registered in the "venticinquina" of San Martino dell'Aposa in 1273. Similarly to all the men of his family and like the inhabitants of his district in general, he was registered in the Società dei Vai in 1274.

== Exile ==
The Salicetos were considered Ghibellines which caused them to flee Bologna when the Guelphs took control of the city in 1274. The city magistrate marked Padua as the place of exile for the Saliceto family – brothers Marco and Matteo, together with each of their minor sons. According to the verdict, they could not leave the walls of the city, their presence was constantly checked by the local authorities. In Padua, Marco also worked as a notary since 1275, while Matteo joined the order of Humiliati.

By 1281, the political orientation of the brothers diverged: while Matteo returned to Bologna and swore loyalty to the Guelphs, which resulted in the restoration of his citizenship, Marco remained in exile and moved to Venice with the permission of the authorities. There, he entered the service of Albertino Morosini, then podestà of Chioggia, who employed him as a notary from 1283 at the latest. It is possible that Baldo da Passignano arrived at the household of Morosini in the same period. Morosini entrusted Marco to educate his nephew, the young Andrew, son of the late Stephen the Posthumous, an alleged member of the Árpád dynasty and former claimant to the Hungarian throne. Zsuza Kovács argued that Marco's title of magister was a mere honorific denomination, which reflects only his illustrious status in the Morosini household. Marco stayed in Venice in the upcoming years. In November 1289, he returned to Bologna for a brief time and was involved in a lawsuit over a clash in Saliceto alongside Matteo before the court of podestà Giacone Giaconi.

Andrew traveled to Hungary in early 1290, where he ascended the throne and was crowned king in July 1290, after the local lords recognized him as a legitimate offspring of the Árpád dynasty. In July 1291, Marco submitted a request to the People's Council of Bologna, in which he requested permission to leave Venice and follow his former disciple to Hungary, which permission was granted to him. It is possible that Marco started his journey in the accompaniment of Queen Tomasina Morosini, the mother of Andrew III, also involving a Venetian official state delegation in September 1291. The ships of the delegation spent a long time wandering off the coast of Dalmatia in the following months, because of the piracy activity of the Šubići, partisans of Andrew's rival, the Capetian House of Anjou. The queen and her entourage successfully landed in Hungary and met Andrew III in July 1292. Nothing is known about Marco's activity in Hungary. Emilio Orioli considered that he became a councilor in the royal court, without a specific position. He definitely stayed in Hungary in September 1294, according to a letter written by Corso Donati, the podestà of Bologna.

== Later life ==
Marco da Saliceto left Hungary by May 1296, when he resided in Mantua, together with his son Mattiolo. It is possible that Marco decided to leave the kingdom just after the death of Queen Tomasina. At that time, Mantua was a stronghold of the Ghibelline faction, where Marco and his family lived in the house of Bonaventura dei Gonzaga. Marco commissioned his cousin Simone di Bonacosa to represent him in a submission appraising his remaining possessions and wealth in Bologna. His complaint describes capital worth a total of 1,300 Bolognese lire, which allows to conclude that his service in Venice and Hungary resulted in serious financial gain for Marco.

In October 1296, Marco and his family were allowed to return to Bologna and their citizenship was restored after more than twenty years. In January 1297, Marco swore loyalty to the Guelph administration. This is the last information about him. Both Marco and Mattiolo died by 1304, when his other son Giovanni ordered an appraisal of his inherited fortune of possessions worth 1,000 Bolognese lire. Francesco Filippini claimed that Marco and Mattiolo were killed in the 1298–1299 war against Azzo VIII d'Este, but this is mere speculation and there is no source for that.

== Legacy ==
Emilio Orioli identified his person with Marco Lombardo, a character in Dante's Purgatorio, where he appears to discuss morality and corruption. Marco asks Dante the pilgrim to pray for his soul. He was commonly regarded as a very courteous and well-learned man, but disdainful and choleric. Orioli claimed there are many similarities between Saliceto's biography and what has been said about the character (Ghibelline courtier and a well-educated man). Francesco Filippini accepted his identification.

Modern scholars – e.g. Guido Zaccagnini, Gina Fasoli and Massimo Giansante – rejected the identification of Marco da Saliceto with Dante's character, based on chronological and geographical reasons. Accordingly, there is an impossibility of accepting the hypothesis that Dante defined as "Lombard" a character of whom, due to the direct and personal knowledge manifested in the poem, he could not have ignored the Bolognese origin and the bond constantly kept alive, even during the years of exile, with a city that in Dante's geography certainly belonged to Romagna and not to Lombardy. In addition, the character Marco Lombardo appeared as a subject of anecdotes and short stories even before Dante's creation of the Divine Comedy, which suggests, that he is a non-existent figure typifying the learned Italian man.

== Sources ==
- Bácsatyai, Dániel (2023). "A széplelkű kamaraispán és más szerencselovagok. III. András olaszai [The Belletrist Chamber Ispán and other Adventurers. The Italians of Andrew III]". Századok (in Hungarian). 157 (6). Magyar Történelmi Társulat: 1171–1193. ISSN 0039-8098.
- Giansante, Massimo (2007). "MARCO da Saliceto". Dizionario Biografico degli Italiani (in Italian). Vol. 69. ISBN 9788812000326.
- Kovács, Zsuzsa (1998). "Italiani alla corte di Andrea III, re d'Ungheria (1290–1301) [Italians in the Court of Andrew III, King of Hungary (1290–1301)]". In Jankovics, József; Monok, István; Nyerges, Judit; Sárközy, Péter (eds.). La civiltà ungherese e il cristianesimo I. / A magyar művelődés és a kereszténység I. (in Italian). Nemzetközi Magyar Filológiai Társaság—Scriptum Rt. pp. 132–139. ISBN 963-8335-54-8.
- Orioli, Emilio (1910). "A bolognai Marco da Saliceto, az utolsó Árpád nevelője [Marco da Saliceto from Bologna, the Tutor of the Last Árpádian]". Századok (in Hungarian). 44 (10). Magyar Történelmi Társulat: 789–801. ISSN 0039-8098.
