= Baldo da Passignano =

Italian poet and Hungarian official

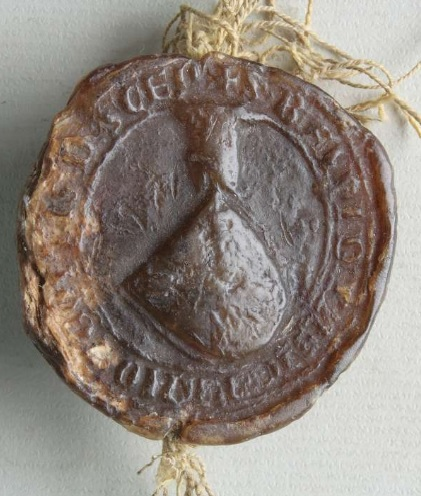
- Seal of Baldo da Passignano, 1291

Ispán of Szepes
- Reign: 1291–1301
- Predecessor: Kuzel (?)
- Successor: Dominic Rátót
- Born: c. 1244; Republic of Florence
- Died: c. 22 June 1332 (aged 87–88); Bologna
- Noble family: Passignano
- Issue: Andrea; Niccolò
- Father: Iacopo da Passignano

Baldo da Passignano (Latin: Baldus de Pasignano, Hungarian: Bald; c. 1244 – c. 22 June 1332) was an Italian noble and poet from the Republic of Florence. He was expelled from Florence in 1268, because of his staunch Ghibelline position. He lived in exile in the Kingdom of Hungary for a decade in the 1290s, during the reign of Andrew III. As a member of the royal court, Baldo served as ispán (count) of Szepes County from 1291 to 1301 and, simultaneously, ispán of the royal chamber between 1291 and 1292.

== Early life ==
His family originated from Passignano located near Tavarnelle Val di Pesa (present-day a frazione of Barberino Tavarnelle). In the early 13th century, they moved to Florence. Baldo was born around 1244, as the son of Iacopo. Alongside his father, he was a prominent Ghibelline in the city. As a result, the Passignanos were expelled from Florence in 1266 or 1268, following the Battle of Benevento and its aftermath. Baldo fled to Bologna and became a member of the Società dei Toschi, a medieval institution of Bologna for people from Tuscany (whose members could only be over 25 years old), in 1269. He took shelter in the house of a certain Pellegrini de Garixendis by 1274. When the local pro-papal Guelphs defeated the Ghibellines in the same year, Baldo had to flee again. The next period of his life is uncertain. Italian historian Guido Zaccagnini considered that Baldo settled down in Padua thereafter, together with other Ghibellines, for instance, Marco da Saliceto. It is possible that Baldo operated as a merchant during his exile years.

Baldo had a brother Pagno and a sister Aldimaringa, who married Gerardo Cipriani, also an exiled Ghibelline man from Florence. Their marriage produced two children, Guetto – who entered the service of future Andrew III – and Giovanna.

His only surviving love poem ("Donzella il core sospira"), which he wrote in his youth, is an example of the Old Occitan troubadour lyric poetry in Tuscany. He wrote that poem during his stay in Bologna and was copied into a late 13th-century anthology of love poems by local poets and troubadours from Tuscany, Bologna, including Guido Guinizelli, Brunetto Latini and Chiaro Davanzati. It is possible that eight poems without marked authorship following Baldo's poem in the anthology were written by him too.

== Career in Hungary ==
It is plausible that both Baldo and his nephew Guetto Cipriani became confidants of Andrew in the 1280s, who stayed in Venice and was a pretender to the Hungarian throne against Ladislaus IV. By that time, the aforementioned Marco da Saliceto served as tutor of the young prince as a member of the household of Albertino Morosini, Andrew's maternal uncle. Baldo was among those Italians, alongside Marco and Guetto, who escorted the young pretender to Hungary in early 1290. Following the assassination of Ladislaus IV in July in that year, he attended the coronation of Andrew III took place in late July or early August 1290.

Andrew III appointed him ispán of Szepes County by April 1291 at the latest. In this capacity, he was commissioned to recover the formerly lost royal estates in the region for the crown. In August 1291, he represented the king during a royal donation in favor of the cathedral chapter of Esztergom, incorporating them into their new ownership. Most of the other documents always show him in this role: at the sales, exchanges and donations of goods his person represented the royal authority. Some documents instead testify that, in addition to intervening in the execution of the royal donations, and performing almost notary functions, he himself donated privileges, prepares reports for the king, e.g. of a problematic case of competence of ecclesiastical taxes. Beside his position as ispán of Szepes County, Baldo also headed the local royal chamber (later known as Szepes Chamber or Camera Scepusiensis) with the title of comes camere domini regis, at least from 1291 to 1292.

It is possible that Baldo is identical with that unidentified Italian official "der Drizkaer" or "der Dreisker", mentioned with only this epithet by Ottokar aus der Gaal's Steirische Reimchronik ("Styrian Rhyming Chronicle"), who was present at the conclusion of the Peace of Hainburg in August 1291, which ended the Austrian–Hungarian war took place in that year. Dániel Bácsatyai considered that the epithet reflected to Baldo's position as ispán of the royal chamber and the tax thirtieth, the collection of which was probably also his portfolio. Baldo also befriended with Lodomer, the Archbishop of Esztergom, who called him "dear friend" in one of his letters in 1293, while Baldo referred to the archbishop as his "benefactor". The seal of Baldo was preserved from the years 1291 and 1294 with the transcriptions "+S. BALDI D. PASIGNANIO. CO(M)ITIS D. SCEP." and "+S. BALDI. D. PA. IGPANO COITIS D. SCEP.", respectively, depicting on a helmeted shield with heraldic leaning to the right, two objects crossing each other (possibly arrowheads), with a rose between their upper stems. The name of two of his deputies (vice-ispáns) are known, Perfectus in 1296 and Jordan in 1299. Upon the intervention of Baldo, Andrew III donated the estate Sebes, an accessory of Sáros Castle in Upper Hungary to his nephew Guetto Cipriani in 1300, with the stipulation that the monarch can take it back at any time for the village Palocsa (present-day Plaveč, Slovakia), which also includes a castle along the Polish border.

== Later life ==
Andrew III died suddenly on 14 January 1301, which cut short Baldo's promising career in Hungary. Amidst evolution of an interregnum in the kingdom, the majority of the Hungarian lords soon invited the young Bohemian prince Wenceslaus to the Hungarian throne. When King Wenceslaus II accompanied his son to Hungary in August 1301, Baldo sold the castle of Szepes (present-day Spiš, Slovakia) to them and decided to left Hungary. Veronika Rudolf incorrectly considered that this transaction occurred when Wenceslaus II invaded Hungary in May 1304, claiming that Baldo handed over the fort without resistance.

Both Baldo and his nephew Guetto returned to Italy. The latter moved to Florence, but after the Black Guelphs came to power in 1302, Guetto again had to leave the city. It is plausible that Baldo never visited his birthplace again during his life. As a rich man with the title of comes, Baldo settled down in Bologna, he is frequently mentioned together with his brother Pagno from 1303 to 1306. He was granted citizenship in 1304 and lived a luxurious life there. He possessed a large palace and several other properties in Tizzanello, a wealthy borough of the city. When the Black Guelphs took control over Bologna in 1307, Baldo moved to Padua.

The exiled poet Francesco da Barberino met Baldo in Padua, describing him "most noble and morose count". According to his narration in Documenti d'amore, Baldo wrote a book titled Liber spei ("The Book of Hope"), which has lost since then. Francesco wrote that Baldo compiled his work "on many novelties, by the tenor of which there was great hope for the nations laziness is removed, and honesty is commanded by his curosity". Since Francesco compared his own work with Baldo's to avoid the accusation of plagiarism, literary historian Zsuzsa Kovács attempted to reconstruct the content of the Liber spei, which was a work of moral content, but it is not clear whether it was a book of Italian poetry, or a Latin treatise, or possibly a combination of both like that of Francesco da Barberino, who wrote of that hope that allures lovers, not of that, in a more general moral sense, which takes away laziness and induces probity treated by Baldo. According to Pietro Corcadi, a historian from Bolsena, Baldo also wrote a historical chronicle on the life and reign of Andrew III, but this work has not survived either.

Baldo returned to Bologna, where he married off his niece Giovanna in 1309. Because of his ailing health, Baldo bequeathed his estate in Tizzanello to his two sons, Andrea and Niccolò in 1310. Despite this, he lived for many years. He joined the Order of the Blessed Virgin Mary by 1316. His name occurs in real estate matters until 1329. Baldo compiled his last will and testament on 22 June 1332. The beneficiaries were a nephew and two grandchildren.

== Sources ==
- Bácsatyai, Dániel (2023). "A széplelkű kamaraispán és más szerencselovagok. III. András olaszai [The Belletrist Chamber Ispán and other Adventurers. The Italians of Andrew III]". Századok (in Hungarian). 157 (6). Magyar Történelmi Társulat: 1171–1193. ISSN 0039-8098.
- Dardano, Maurizio (1963). "BALDO da Passignano". Dizionario Biografico degli Italiani (in Italian). Vol. 5. ISBN 9788812000326.
- Kovács, Zsuzsa (1998). "Italiani alla corte di Andrea III, re d'Ungheria (1290–1301) [Italians in the Court of Andrew III, King of Hungary (1290–1301)]". In Jankovics, József; Monok, István; Nyerges, Judit; Sárközy, Péter (eds.). La civiltà ungherese e il cristianesimo I. / A magyar művelődés és a kereszténység I. (in Italian). Nemzetközi Magyar Filológiai Társaság—Scriptum Rt. pp. 132–139. ISBN 963-8335-54-8.
- Rudolf, Veronika (2023). Közép-Európa a hosszú 13. században [Central Europe in the Long 13th Century] (in Hungarian). Arpadiana XV., Research Centre for the Humanities. ISBN 978-963-416-406-7.
- Weisz, Boglárka (2010). "Kamaraispánok az Árpád-korban [Ispáns of Chamber in the Age of Árpáds]". Turul (in Hungarian). 83 (3). Magyar Heraldikai és Genealógiai Társaság: 79–87. ISSN 1216-7258.
- Zsoldos, Attila (2011). Magyarország világi archontológiája, 1000–1301 [Secular Archontology of Hungary, 1000–1301] (in Hungarian). História, MTA Történettudományi Intézete. ISBN 978-963-9627-38-3.

Political offices
Preceded by (?) Kuzel	Ispán of Szepes; 1291–1301	Succeeded by Dominic Rátót
