= Nicoletto da Torino =

Italian composer

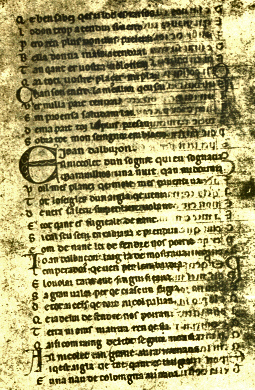
Nicoletto's tenso with Joan d'Albusson. The large "E" in the centre of the page begins the line En Nicolet ...

Nicoletto da Torino (Occitan: Nic(c)olet de Turin or Nicolez de Turrin) was a Piedmontese jongleur and troubadour of the first half of the thirteenth century, probably from Turin, though some believe that to be his father's name. He produced three surviving tensos with Joan d'Albusson, Falquet de Romans, and Uc de Saint Circ.

Nicoletto is probably the same person as the "Nicolet" who appears in a list of jongleurs in Li fol e.il put e.il filol, a sirventes of Aimeric de Peguilhan, which was written at the Malaspina court, probably in or around 1220. Chronologically such an identification is possible based on Nicoletto's surviving works and the references they contain. Based on his tenso with Falquet, Nicoletto evidently travelled in Burgundy, where he found the people annoying, and returned to Italy to the court of Biandrate.

Nicoletto also exchanged verses with Uc de Saint Circ. These lamented the fact that Adelaide di Vidalliana (today Viadana) had not been received with as much honour as Donella di Brescia and Selvaggia (perhaps Selvaggia d’Auramala, daughter of Conrad I Malaspina). This tenso has been customarily dated to c. 1225, when it is known Selvaggia was in the flower of youth.

== Sources ==
- Bertoni, Giulio. I Trovatori d'Italia: Biografie, testi, tradizioni, note. Rome: Società Multigrafica Editrice Somu, 1967 [1915].
- Paterson, Linda. "Joan d'Albuzon – Nicolet de Turin: En Nicolet, d'un sognie qu'ieu sognava (BdT 265.2 = 310.1)." Lecturae tropatorum, 1 (2008), pp. 1–18.
