= Almucs de Castelnau =

12th-century Occitan female troubadour

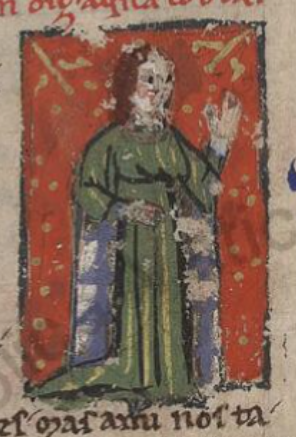
- Almucs de Castelnau depicted in a c. 1275 manuscript
- Born: c. 1140 near Avignon
- Died: c. 1184
- Occupation: trobairitz (female troubadour)
- Notable work: Dompna n'Iseus, s'ieu saubes

Almucs de Castelnau or Castelnou (c. 1140–c. 1184) was a trobairitz (a female troubadour) from a town near Avignon in Provence. (Note: Regarding her first name, Almucs, the following variants have been documented: Almuc, Almou, Almodis, Almurs, Aelmudis, Almaudis, Adalmudis, Adalmua, Adalmues, and Azalmuers.)

== Works ==
Almucs' only known work is a stanza in a two-stanza tenso (poetic exchange) with Iseut de Capio, another trobairitz.

Each stanza of the song, found in a thirteenth-century manuscript chansonnier, is introduced by a razo and accompanied by an illuminated miniature. It tells how Iseut de Capio begged Almucs de Castelnau to pardon Gigo (Gui), lord of Tournon (Tornon) in the Vivarais and Iseut's knight, who had committed "a great fault" against Almucs. Gigo, however, neither repented nor sought forgiveness, and so Almucs responded to Iseut in a stanza of her own:

Dompna n'Iseus, s'ieu saubes
qu'el se pentis de l'engan
qu'el a fait vas mi tan gran
ben fora dreich que n'agues
merces; mas a mi no.s taing
pos que del tort no s'afraing
ni.s pentis del faillimen,
que n'aja mais chauzimen;
mas si vos fiitz pentir
leu podretz mi convertir.

—Almucs de Castelnau:
Dompna n'Iseus, s'ieu saubes
Translation:

Lady Iseut, if he showed some contrition
he might be able to erase
the effects of his disgrace
and I might grant him some remission;
but I think I'd be unwise
since by his silence he denies
the wrong he's done, to in any way relieve
a man who was so eager to deceive.
Still, if you can get him to repent his perfidy
you'll have no trouble in converting me.

—Meg Bogin

For other translations into English, see Bruckner and Keelan.

Travers (2021) places the portrayals of speaking women in Dante's contemporaneous Vita Nova in a broader cultural context by comparing them with the stances expressed by Almucs and other trobairitz in the chansonnier.

Some scholars assert that Almucs is mentioned (reading Dompna Na Mieils as dompna nal murs) in stanza VII of the poem Ia de chantar non degra aver talan by the trobairitz Castelloza.

=== Interpretations ===
The jazz vocalist Cécile McLorin Salvant has interpreted the stanza in live performance and in a studio album recording.

Stevie Wishart, a composer, improviser, and performer on the hurdy-gurdy and violin, directed the group Sinfonye in a recording as part of a compendium of trobairitz lyrics set to music played on reproductions of medieval instruments.

== Commemoration ==
Almucs de Castelnau's name is one of many inscribed on the Heritage Floor, a component of The Dinner Party, a 1979 mixed-media artwork by Judy Chicago. In the associated Heritage Panels, the artist links Almucs to Eleanor of Aquitaine, a noted patron of troubadours.

== Identification ==
=== Almodis de Caseneuve ===
Bogin believes that Almucs can be identified with a certain Almodis of Caseneuve. Caseneuve is not far from Avignon and near Les Chapelins, which may have been the home of Iseut de Capio. Chronologically, Almodis and Almucs would have been contemporaries, and the lords of Caseneuve have documented relationships with other troubadours. Almodis was the second wife of Guirand I de Simiane, who also ruled Apt and Gordes. She gave birth to four sons, including Raimbout d'Agould, the second eldest, who, in 1173, accompanied his father on Crusade. Since Raimbout must have been old enough at the time to make such an arduous journey and Guirand's first wife had died in 1151, Almodis's marriage can be placed, according to Bogin, between that date and c. 1161, assuming that the son would have been at least twelve at the time of the Crusade. Bogin suggests that a widower of Guirand's standing would have quickly remarried, and that Almodis was therefore probably born not much later than 1140.

=== Wife of Guigo de Randon ===
It is also possible that Almucs was the wife of Guigo de Castelnou de Randon, who flourished around 1200.
