= Clara d'Anduza =

Clara d'Anduza was a trobairitz from the first third of the 13th century. She was probably born to the ruling family of Anduze, or else married into it: Bernard d'Anduze is sometimes theorized to have been her father, or perhaps her husband. She wrote her works in the Provençal dialect of Occitan and is believed to have possibly been from Languedoc.

Her only surviving work is a canso beginning En greu esmay et en greu pessamen ("In grave distress and great trouble"). This poem describes her suffering and attributes her separation from her amic to the harm done by slanderers (lauzingier). The poem connects to other common motifs in other works by women troubadour: unfailing infidelity, self-reflexivity, and metaphors representing love, pain, and desire.

She was mentioned in a long razo to a canso of Uc de Saint Circ and was probably the addressee of a salut of Azalais d'Altier. A narrative commentary on Uc de Saint Circ's "Anc mais non vi temps ni sanzo" identifies Uc as Clara's secretary and would-be lover. She was probably acquainted with Pons de Capduelh.

== Sources ==
- Bruckner, Matilda Tomaryn; Shepard, Laurie; and White, Sarah. Songs of the Women Troubadours. New York: Garland Publishing, 1995. ISBN 0-8153-0817-5.
