= Guillelma de Rosers =

Guillelma de Rosers (fl. 1235–1265), also spelled Guilleuma, Guillielma, Guilielma, or Guilhelma, was a Provençal trobairitz of the mid-thirteenth century, one of the last known trobairitz. She was originally from Rougiers but lived in Genoa for a long time, where she met Lanfranc Cigala, who wrote about her in some songs. These and Lanfranc's vida form the major source of information about her life. She is also the addressee—la flor de cortezia, the flower of courtliness—of an anonymous canso, "Quan Proensa ac perduda proeza" (when Provence had lost prowess), which bemoans her long stay in Genoa.

Guillelma's only surviving piece of poetry is a partimen, "Na Guillelma, maint cavalier arratge", with Lanfranc, in which he posed her the dilemma:

Dame Guilllelma, a band of weary knights
abroad in the dark, in most dismal weather,
wished aloud in their own tongues that they might
find shelter. Two lovers happened to over-
hear while on their way to their ladies who
lived close at hand; one of them turned back to
help the knights, the other went to his lady:
which of the two behaved most fittingly?

Guillelma answered that l'autre fes ben ("the other did well") for "the man who keeps his word is held in much / higher esteem than he whose plans are in flux."

== Bibliography ==
- Bogin, Meg (1976). The Women Troubadours. Scarborough: Paddington. ISBN 0-8467-0113-8.
- Bruckner, Matilda Tomaryn; Shepard, Laurie; and White, Sarah. (1995). Songs of the Women Troubadours. New York: Garland Publishing. ISBN 0-8153-0817-5.
- Egan, Margarita (1984). The Vidas of the Troubadours. New York: Garland. ISBN 0-8240-9437-9.
- Healy, Elliott D. (1948). "Lanfrance Cigala, Poet of the Dolce Stilnuovo in Provençal." Studies in Philology, 45, pp. 432–45
- Kehew, Robert; Pount, Ezra; and Snodgrass, William De Witt (2005). Lark in the Morning: The Verses of the Troubadours. Chicago: University of Chicago Press. ISBN 0-226-42932-6.
