= Iseut de Capio =

12th century noblewoman and troubadour

Damaged image accompanying Iseut's razo and song in chansonnier H

Iseut de Capio (born c. 1140) was a noblewoman and trobairitz from Gévaudan. She was a neighbour and contemporary of the trobairitz Almucs de Castelnau, with whom she shared the composition of a tenso. It is her only surviving piece of work.

== Life ==
Iseut's origins are a matter of conjecture. What can be said with certainty is that she was from the castrum [castle] de Capione, medieval Occitan Capio or Capion, identified with either modern Chapieu or Chapelins. The castle stood atop the Mont Mimat above the river Mende. She may have belonged to the family of the lords of Tournel, one of the eight baronies of Gévaudan, and the one in which Chapieu lay. Tournel belonged to the Diocese of Mende and only on the death of Bishop Aldebert (III) de Tournel in 1187 did it return to the family of Chapieu. Since the family adopted the exclusive use of the Tournel surname around 1250, Iseut's floruit is sometimes placed between those dates.

There is a long razo (explanatory gloss) preceding the exchange of stanzas (coblas) between Iseut and Almucs. It tells how Iseut begged Almucs to pardon Gigo (Gui), lord of Tournon (Tornon) in the Vivarais. Gigo was Iseut's knight, but had committed "a great fault" against Almucs. Since he neither repented nor sought forgiveness, Almucs responded to Iseut's request in a cobla of her own. This exchange has been dated to around 1190.

== Sources ==
- Bogin, Meg. The Women Troubadours. Scarborough: Paddington, 1976. ISBN 0-8467-0113-8.
- Bruckner, Matilda Tomaryn; Shepard, Laurie; and White, Sarah. Songs of the Women Troubadours. New York: Garland Publishing, 1995. ISBN 0-8153-0817-5.
