= Francesco da Barberino =

Tuscan notary, doctor of law and author (1264–1348)

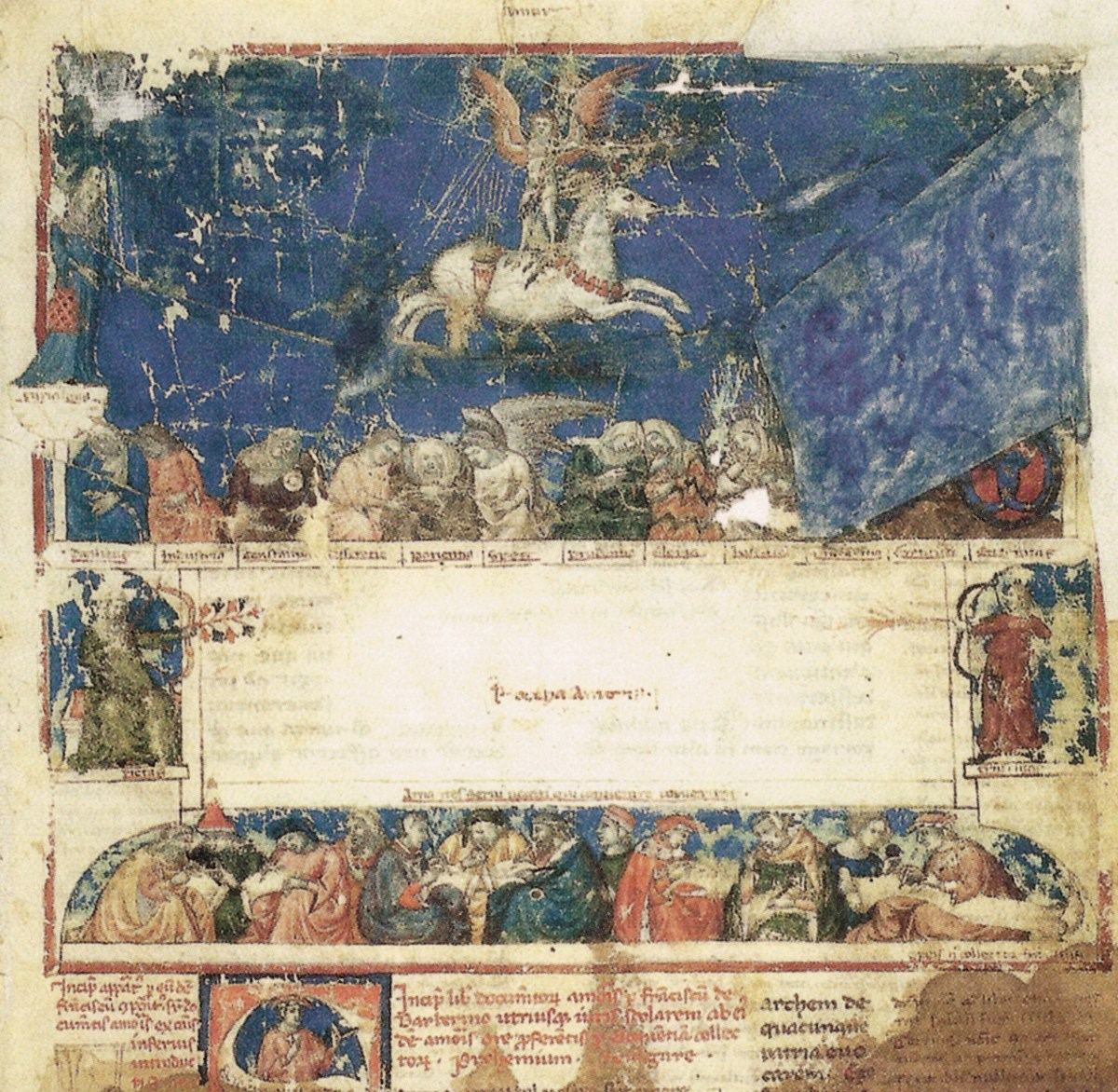
Frontispiece of a copy of the Documenti d'amore made by Francesco himself (Barb.lat. 4076)

Francesco di Neri di Ranuccio, known better as Francesco da Barberino (1264–1348), was a Tuscan notary, doctor of law and author.

He first went to Florence to study in 1281. Between 1303 and 1314 and again between 1315 and 1317, he was exiled from the city on account of his Ghibelline political leanings. He worked for a time as a diplomat for Venice and passed his exile at courts in Provence, France and Spain. After his return to Florence, he gained respect as a notary and lawyer, but was not admitted to political office until the last three years of his life.

He is best known for two didactic works on virtue, the Documenti d'amore for men and the Reggimento e costume di donna for women, written in a mixture of prose and verse in both Tuscan and Latin. They are notable for their citations of other authors from classical antiquity to his own time, including numerous vernacular authors not known from any other source.

== Life ==
Francesco was born into a noble family in Barberino Val d'Elsa in 1264. He was not related to the Barberini. His father, Neri di Ranuccio, was a political Ghibelline who relocated from the city of Florence to the countryside. He was Francesco's first educator. Between 1281 and 1290, he studied the liberal arts in Florence. In the 1290s, he studied at the University of Bologna, where by 1294 he had he received his licence in civil law and became a notary. At some point he took minor orders.

Upon his father's death in 1296, Francesco returned to Barberino. Between 1297 and 1303, he worked in Florence as a notary of the bishop of Florence. There he adopted the toponymic surname "da Barberino" in preference to the patronymic "di Neri di Ranuccio". In Florence, he met the painters Cimabue and Giotto. He married around 1303. In 1304, he was exiled from Florence as a Ghibelline.

Francesco lived in Padua from 1304 to 1308, where he continued his studies in law and philosophy. In 1308, he moved to Treviso, perhaps to work for the podestà Corso Donati. From 1309 to 1313, he lived at various courts beyond the Alps. He was the ambassador of the Republic of Venice to Pope Clement V in Avignon, where he was the personal friend of Cardinal Pietro Colonna. He stayed at the court of King Philip IV of France in Paris and then that of King Louis I in Navarre. He continued to act as a mediator with Venice.

On 28 March 1313, Francesco received a doctorate of both laws by papal bull, although the bishop of Florence would not confirm it for five years. In 1313, he returned to Italy, residing in Venice. His first wife died that year and he married Barna di Tanuccio Rinieri. He returned to Florence in 1314–1315, but soon left again for other cities, including Mantua. He returned definitively to Florence in 1317–1318.

In 1321, Francesco acted as Florentine ambassador to Pisa. In 1322–1323, he was the executor of Bishop Antonio d'Orso and advised the sculptor Tino da Camaino on the decoration of the bishop's tomb. He took part in the legal and economic affairs of the Florentine republic in his capacity as a doctor of both laws, but he was excluded from politics on account of his Ghibellinism until 1345, when he and his son Filippo were elected councillors. In 1347, he and Francesco Salviati were named consuls of the college of judges. In 1348, he was elected to the Signoria. Among his fellow Florentine literati, Francesco had a good reputation for his public service. Filippo Villani included an entry on Francesco in biographical dictionary of Florence and Giovanni Boccaccio praises him in Genealogia deorum gentilium.

Francesco died in early April 1348 of the Black Death. He was buried in the basilica of Santa Croce. He had five children, all sons, by his first wife: Galazzo, Filippo, Antonio, Taddeo and Raineri. He had another child by his second wife.

== Works ==
In Bologna, Francesco first came into contact with the literary circle influenced by Guido Guinizzelli. During his second period in Florence, he became acquainted with the stilnovisti, including Dante Alighieri and Guido Cavalcanti. His earliest known works date to this period, but are both lost: some lyric poems for a certain Costanza and the Flores novellarum (Italian Fiori di novelle), a collection of tales of Provençal origin.

During his transalpine sojourn, he wrote a letter in Latin to the Emperor Henry VII. Like Dante, he was convinced that a powerful emperor was the key to peace in Europe. It was probably also during his exile that he wrote his two surviving longer works in the Tuscan vernacular, Documenti d'amore ('lessons about love') and Reggimento e costume di donna ('rules on good behaviour for women'). His citation of authors from Aristotle down to Jean de Joinville, in both Latin and various vernaculars, demonstrates the breadth of his reading. His knowledge of the Occitan poetry of the troubadours was unparalleled in contemporary Italy.

Francesco's works were not widely read, but they are now regarded as standing at the head of the Italian etiquette tradition of Il Cortegiano and Il Galateo.

=== Documenti d'amore ===
The Documenti was probably begun by 1309 and completed by 1315. It is a didactic work aimed at a male bourgeois audience. It is written in Tuscan verse with accompanying Latin translation and explanatory glosses by Francesco. It is an allegorical work, divided into twelve sections of unequal length, each containing the words of a female personification of a virtue, relaying the precepts of chivalry and good behaviour that Love dictated to Eloquence. The verse forms vary. Most of the citations of other authors are in the Latin commentary.

The Documenti is a historically valuable text. It contains evidence for dating the composition of the Divine Comedy. It also contains citations of 13th- and 14th-century Occitan, Italian and French poets known from no other source. Francesco was also up to date with the latest literary trends in Italy. Besides Alighieri, Guinizzelli and Cavalcanti, he cites Brunetto Latini, Dino Compagni, Baldo da Passignano and Albertino Mussato.

The Documenti is contained in five surviving codices. Two now in the Vatican Library are Barb.lat. 4076 and Barb. lat. 4077. The former is an autograph manuscript, which Francesco himself copied and illustrated, while the second is a partial autograph, the illustration of which was supervised by Francesco.

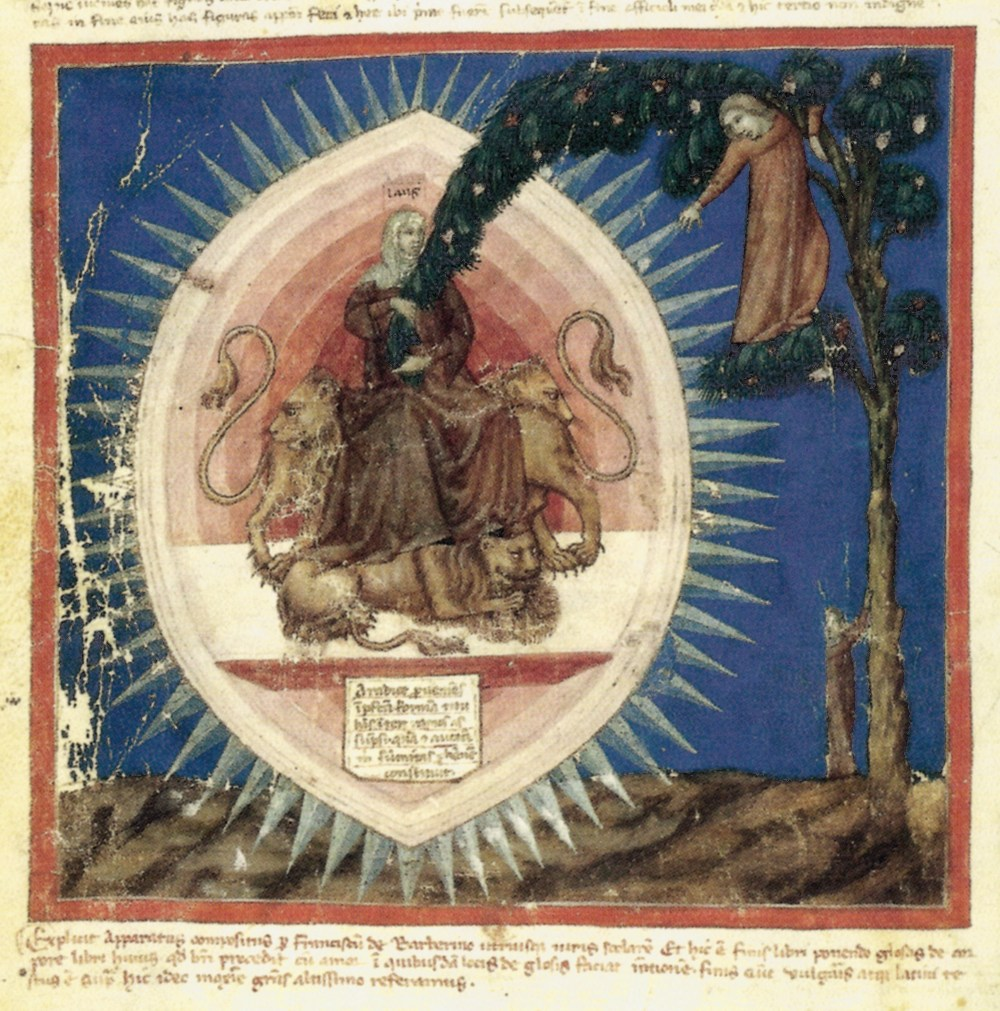
Triumph of fame from Barb.lat. 4076

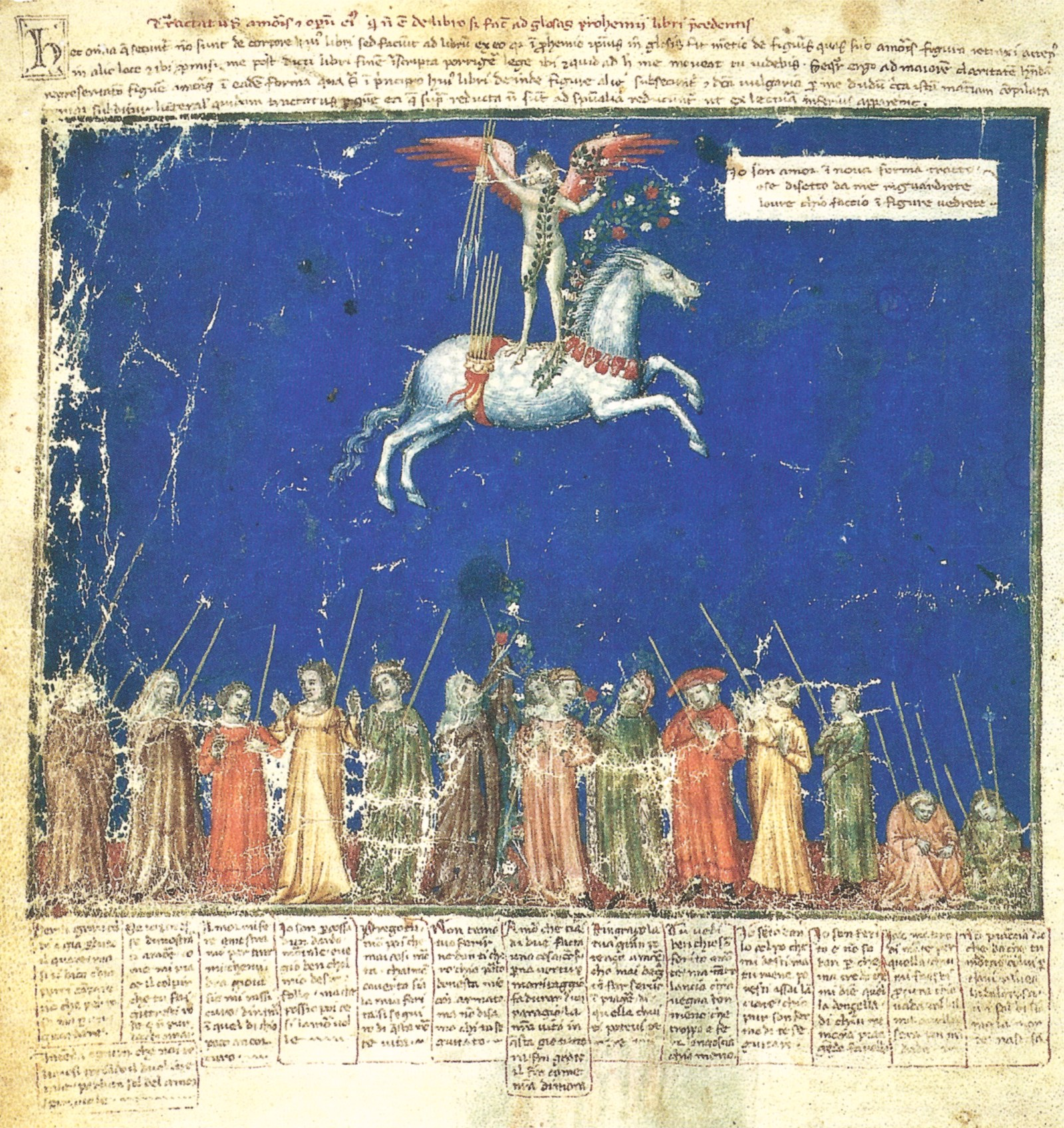
Triumph of love from Barb.lat. 4076

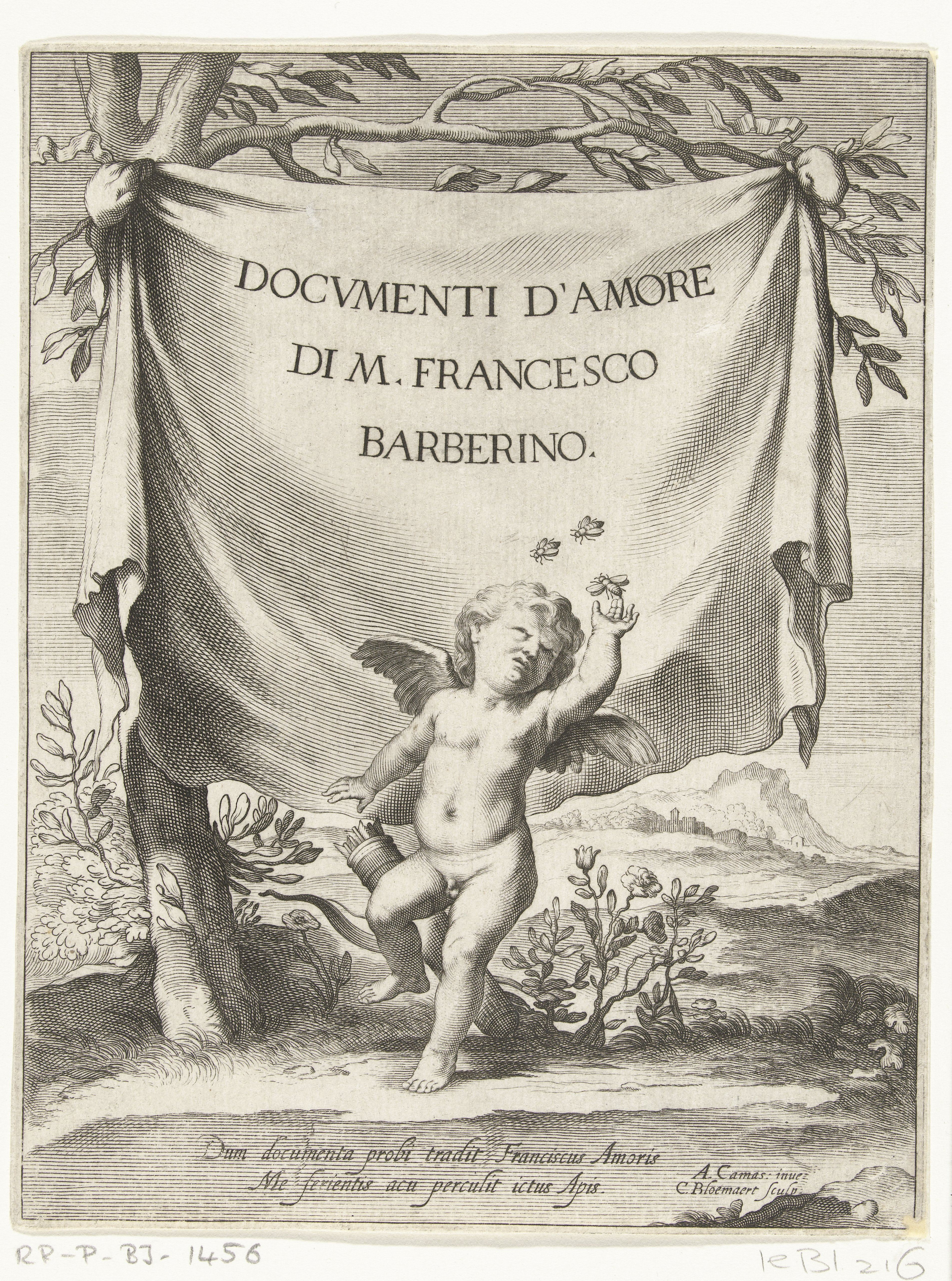
Title page of an edition printed at Rome, 1640

=== Reggimento e costume di donna ===
The Reggimento was completed by 1320, slightly later than the Documenti. Francesco claims to be writing at the request of an unnamed lady. It is a courtesy book that complements the Documenti for women. Divided into twenty sections on different virtues, it was intended to be illustrated. It is written entirely in Tuscan, but in a mixture of prose and verse. Certain passages are reminiscent of the cantari. It is of interest as a historical source for the domestic customs and interests of women. It contains the only surviving verses (in translation) of the trobairitz Lisa de Londres.

The Reggimento is known from two copies in a single manuscript tradition, both now in the Vatican: Barb.lat. 4001 and its copy, Capponiano 50.

== Bibliography ==
- Allaire, Gloria (2004). "Francesco da Barberino". In Christopher Kleinhenz (ed.). Medieval Italy: An Encyclopedia. Vol. 2. Routledge. pp. 364–365.
- Bischetti, Sara (2021). "Il punto sui manoscritti dei Documenti d'Amore". In Sara Bischetti; Antonio Montefusco (eds.). Francesco da Barberino al crocevia: Culture, società, bilinguismo. De Gruyter. pp. 13–36.
- Davie, Mark (2002). "Francesco Da Barberino". In Peter Hainsworth; David Robey (eds.). The Oxford Companion to Italian Literature. Oxford University Press.
- Paden, William D. (2018). "The Lives of the Troubadours: A New Biographical Dictionary". Romance Philology. 72 (1): 111–124.
- Pasquini, Emilio (1997). "Francesco da Barberino". Dizionario Biografico degli Italiani (in Italian). Vol. 49: Forino–Francesco da Serino. Rome: Institute of the Italian Encyclopaedia. ISBN 978-88-12-00032-6.
- Stoppino, Eleonora (2009). "The Italian Reggimento e costumi di donna (selections) and Documenti d'amore (selections) of Francesco da Barberino". In Mark Johnston (ed.). Medieval Conduct Literature: An Anthology of Vernacular Guides to Behaviour for Youths with English Translations. University of Toronto Press. pp. 127–183. doi:10.3138/9781442697614-006.
