= Bernart de Bondeills =

Bernart de Bondeills (or Bondeilhs) was a 13th-century Occitan troubadour known from only one composition, the canso Tot aissi·m pren com fai als Assesis, found in chansonnier M, BnF Paris, f.f. 12474. Although originally from the Auvergne, he worked at the court of the north Italian nobleman Ottone del Carretto, a prolific patron of troubadours.

Tot aissi·m pren com fai als Assesis is a love poem. Bernart begins by comparing himself to an Assassin in his devotion to love: "Just as the Assassins serve their master unfailingly ... so I have served Love with unswerving loyalty". This is in contrast to the use of the same trope in Aimeric de Peguilhan, written about the same time, who considers himself an Assassin in devotion to his lady. The Assassins were an Islamic sect whose devotion to their leader, the Old Man of the Mountain, had become legendary in Europe through the Crusades. The first troubadours to use the name, like Bernart and Aimeric, associate the term primarily with fanatical devotion and not political murder.

In the tornada, Bernart sends his poem "to the brave marquis of Carretto" (al pro marqes del Carret) in a place called Point, probably Ponti, not far from Alessandria. Ottone and his son Ugo possessed a castle there in 1209, when they sold it to the city of Asti. It was reacquired by the Carretto family at some point before 1269. The most likely date for the poem, however, is the 1220s, when Ottone's patronage was at its height and he still possessed economic and feudal rights in Ponti.
