= Guilhem de la Tor =

Italian composer

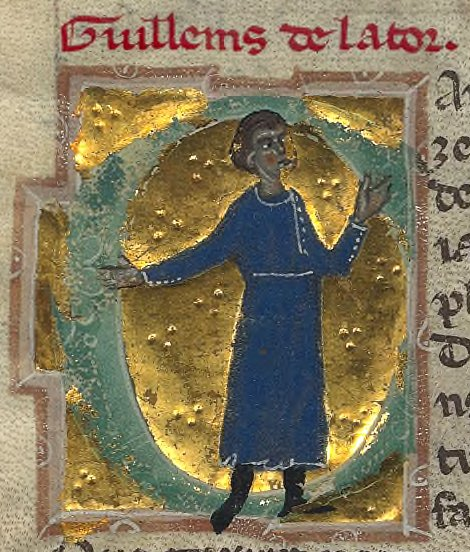
Guilhem de la Tor

Guilhem de la Tor (Old Occitan: [ɡiˈʎɛm de la ˈtuɾ] fl. 1216–1233) was an early 13th-century jongleur-troubadour from the Périgord who spent most of his active career in northern Italy. He circulated between the courts of the Este, Malaspina, and Da Romano families.

== Life ==
The tor (tower, castle) that was Guilhem's birthplace, does not survive. It lay in the vicinity of the modern town of La Tour-Blanche, Dordogne. Guilhem first composed in the Occitan language in 1216–1220, during which period he produced the panegyric Pos N'Aimerics a fait mesclança e batailla, a song in which the noble women of Italy put an end to a feud for supremacy at court between Selvaggia and Beatrice di Oramala, daughters of Conrad Malaspina. The Treva ("truce"), as it is called, was a sequel to an earlier work (now lost) by Aimeric de Pegulhan describing the feud.

Guilhem is dignified with a long vida, but much of it cannot be trusted. Among the more trustworthy parts is this description of his character and routine:

And he knew many songs, and created and sang well and graciously, and he also invented (trobaire). But when he wanted to recite his songs, he made his discussions of the explanation (razo) longer than the song itself.

The subsequent narrative of the vida is an invention. It relates how he fell in love with a young and beautiful barber's wife in Milan and abducted her to Como, where they married and "he loved her more than anything in the world." When she died, Guilhem went mad over the loss and began to believe that she was posing as dead in order to leave him. For ten days he reglularly removed her from the tomb and kissed her and hugged her and asked her to tell him if she were alive or dead and, if dead, to tell him what sufferings she were experiencing so that he could alleviate it with masses and alms. But when the leading men of the city heard this, they expelled him and he went wandering around looking for a sorcerer or sorceress who could bring his wife back to life. He encountered a "trickster" who told him to recite daily the entire Psalter and 150 Paternosters and to give alms to seven poor men before he ate each day, then she would come back to life, but would never eat, drink, or talk. Guilhem set out to do as he was told, but she had not returned to him, he despaired and died. This bizarre legend is related to a partimen between Guilhem and Sordello, Un amics et un'amia, in which the former posed the dilemma of whether it is better to follow a deceased lover to death or to move on. The partimen can be dated to 1224–1226, before Sordello's kidnapping of Cunizza da Romano (Na Cuniza in the poem).

== Works ==
Guilhem was a Ghibelline in sympathy and he wrote Un sirventes farai d'una trista persona to attack the Guelph podestà Ponzio Amato di Cremona. He lampoons the hated Guelph politician as Porc Armat ("armed pig") de Cremona. This song was written before Ponzio's death in 1228.

Guilhem's last song was Canson ab gais motz plazens, inspired by the death in November 1233 of Giovanna d'Este. A charter of Ottone del Carretto dated that same month was witnessed by one "Guillelmus de la Turri", possibly the same person as the troubadour.

== Sources ==
- Egan, Margarita, ed. The Vidas of the Troubadours. New York: Garland, 1984. ISBN 0-8240-9437-9.
- Negri, Antonella. Le Liriche del trovatore Guilhem de la Tor. Rubbettino Editore, 2006.
- Riquer, Martín de. Los trovadores: historia literaria y textos. 3 vol. Barcelona: Planeta, 1975.
