= Jacme Grils =

Italian composer

Jacme or Iacme Gril(s) (Italian: Giacomo Grillo; fl. 1244–1262) was a Genoese troubadour of the mid-thirteenth century. He wrote two tensos which survive, one with Lanfranc Cigala and another (fragmentary) one with Simon Doria.

There are several "Giacomo Grillos" mentioned in thirteenth-century documents from Genoa and it is difficult to definitively identify the troubadour with one. Chronologically, the Giacomo mentioned in an act of 15 August 1281 was probably not the troubadour. There were a Giacomo Grillo di Andrea and another di Alberto, but these are also unlikely candidates. The most likely is a judge who appeared in an act of 4 June 1257 concerning a division of property of the margraves of Ponzone. He was definitely a contemporary of Lanfranc. This is probably the same Giacomo as was responsible for providing lodging for Pope Innocent IV at Stella in 1244 and appears in an act of 7 March 1247 in the Liber Jurium Januae. He was also elected one of the fifteen reggitori della città (rectors of the city) in 1262 after the overthrow of Guglielmo Boccanegra. Luca Grimaldi, another troubadour, was one of the others.

Though little is known of him and his surviving poetry is limited, Jacme was an esteemed poet to his contemporaries in Genoa. In a tenso with Simon Doria, Lanfranc alluded to Jacme's judicial profession:

A'n Iacme Gril, en cui es conoissenza, Amics Symon, trametam la tenzon, Q'en cobleian en don drecha sentenza.	To Sir Jacme Grils, in whom is knowledge, friend Simon, send this tenso, so that he can impose a just sentence on the verses.

In a subsequent poem, Lanfranc connected Jacme with a Na Flors-de-lis (or Fiordiligi), a senhal for an unnamed Genoese woman, whom he submits to the Jacme's judgement. Segne'n Iacme Grils, e.us deman, Jacme's tenso with Simon Doria, is modeled on one between Sordello and Peire Guilhem de Tolosa and it is written in an effort to mock the former. Jacme's tenso with Lanfranc begins Per o car vos fegnetz de sotilment entendre.

== Sources ==
- Bertoni, Giulio. I Trovatori d'Italia: Biografie, testi, tradizioni, note. Rome: Società Multigrafica Editrice Somu, 1967 [1915].
- Meneghetti, Maria Luisa. "Intertextuality and dialogism in the troubadours." The Troubadours: An Introduction. Simon Gaunt and Sarah Kay, edd. Cambridge: Cambridge University Press, 1999. ISBN 0-521-57473-0.
