= Marco Lombardo =

Venetian nobleman

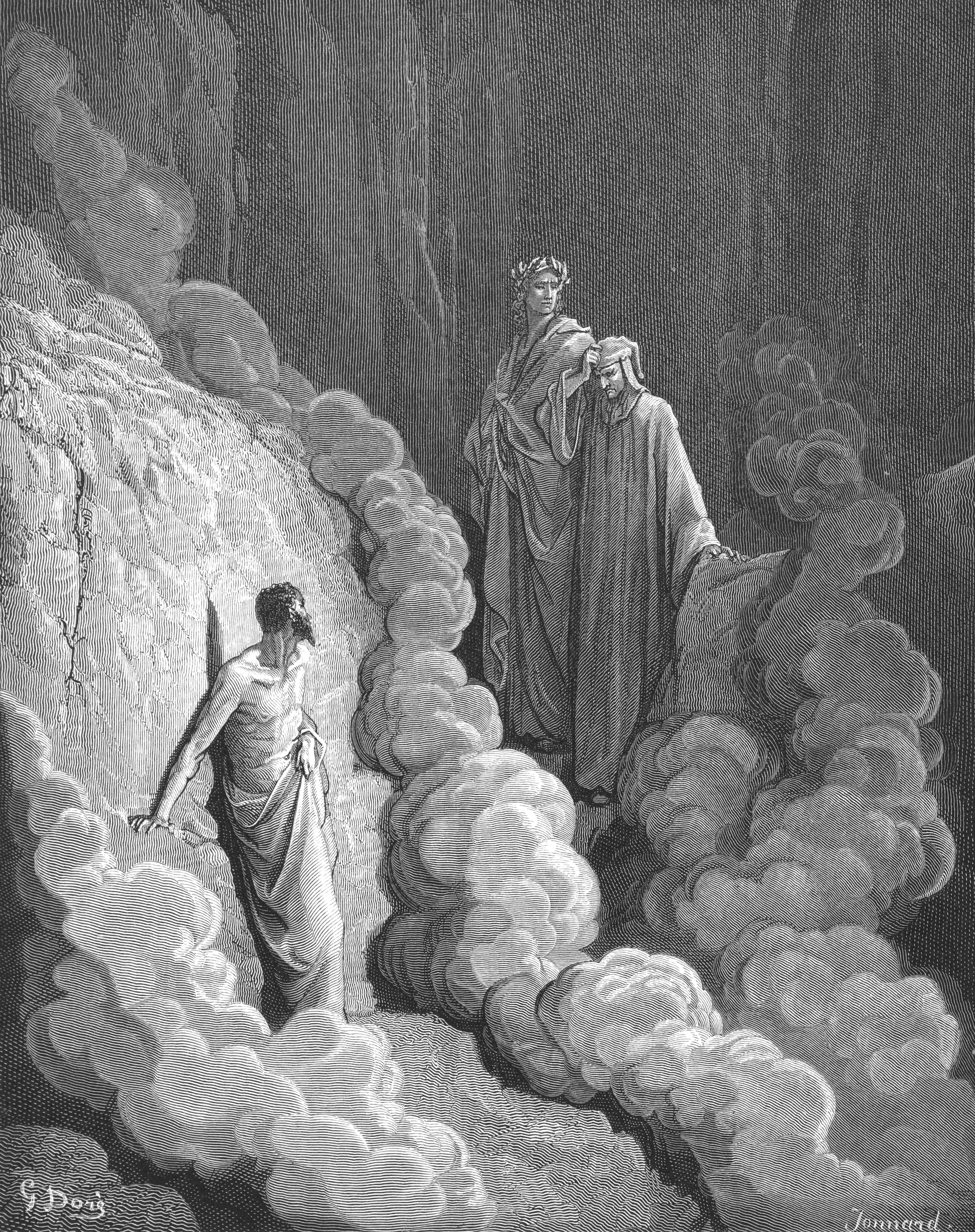
Dante and Virgil encounter Marco Lombardo in Purgatorio 16, as illustrated by Gustave Doré

Marco Lombardo (fl. c. 1275) was a courtier from medieval Lombardy. His date of birth and true identity are unknown, but he is thought to have lived during the second half of the thirteenth century. He is also believed to have served many courts and possibly those of Gherardo III da Camino and Ugolino della Gherardesca. Some historians – e.g. Emilio Orioli and Francesco Filippini – identified him with Marco da Saliceto. He was widely known in medieval Italy and appeared as a character of anecdotes and short stories even before Dante's creation of the Divine Comedy.

Marco was commonly regarded as a very courteous and well-learned man, but disdainful and choleric. He appears as a character in Canto 16 of Purgatorio, the second canticle of Dante Alighieri's Divine Comedy, to discuss morality and corruption. Marco asks Dante the pilgrim to pray for his soul.

He is also mentioned anecdotally in a thirteenth-century collection of short stories entitled Novellino, Francesco da Buti's commentary to the Divine Comedy, and the Nuova Cronica by Giovanni Villani.
