= Alamanda de Castelnau =

French troubadour

Alamanda was a trobairitz whose only surviving work is a tenso with Giraut de Bornelh called S'ie us qier conseill, bella amia Alamanda. In the past she was usually considered fictitious and the "tenso" was considered a piece of Giraut's writing. However, an Alamanda is mentioned by three other troubadours, including the trobairitz Lombarda, indicating that she was probably real and quite prominent in Occitan poetic circles.

Her tenso with Giraut de Bornelh mirrors in form a canso by the Comtessa de Dia.

The trobairitz is often identified with Alamanda de Castelnau or Castelnou who was born around 1160. She was probably poetically active only briefly while spending her youth at the court of Raymond V of Toulouse (reigned 1148-1194). She left his court to marry Guilhem de Castelnou and later became a canoness of Saint-Étienne at Toulouse, dying in 1223.
