= Joan d'Aubusson =

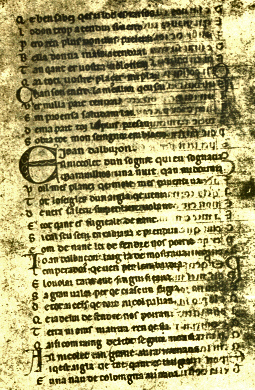
Joan's tenso with Nicoletto. The large "E" in the centre of the page begins the line En Nicolet ... Above the first line is the name of the first speaker, Joan dalbuzon.

Joan d'Aubusson or d'Albusson (fl. 1229), known as Johan or Johanet to Occitan contemporaries (Giovanni in Italian), was an Limousin troubadour and a Ghibelline. Only three of his works survive: two tensos and a cobla.

Joan was often present at the court of the viscount Peter of Aubusson and his wife Margaret. He also stayed at the court of Blacatz sometime between 1200 and 1236. He was apparently often present at the court of the Emperor Frederick II.

Joan wrote songs about Frederick and his war with the Lombard League. Along with Terrisio d'Atina, he described Frederick as the lord of the four elements—air, earth, fire, and water—which he could thus command in his campaigns against the enemies of the Holy Roman Empire. The only certain date in Joan's life is 1229, for he mentions the strengthening of the bond between Boniface II of Montferrat and the emperor in that year.

Joan wrote a famous tenso with Sordello da Goito, "Digatz mi s'es vers zo c'om brui" ("Tell me if you are truly what you proclaim"), in which he informs us that the Italian troubadour was forced to be a jongleur at the court of Azzo VII of Este before becoming a troubadour in Provence. Besides his tenso with Sordello, Joan also composed a tenso with another Italian troubadour, Nicoletto da Torino.

== Sources ==
- Bertoni, Giulio. I Trovatori d'Italia: Biografie, testi, tradizioni, note. Rome: Somu, 1967 [1915].
- Lewis, Frank R. "Peter of Aubusson" in Notes and Documents. The English Historical Review, Vol. 55, No. 219. (Jul., 1940), pp. 419–423.
- Musca, Giosuè. Il mezzogiorno normanno-svevo e le crociate. Bari: Edizioni Dedalo, 2002. ISBN 88-220-4160-7.
- Paterson, Linda. "Joan d'Albuzon – Nicolet de Turin: En Nicolet, d'un sognie qu'ieu sognava (BdT 265.2 = 310.1)." Lecturae tropatorum, 1 (2008), pp. 1–18.
- Sordello da Goito presented by Rotary International, Mantua
