= Simon Doria =

Italian statesman and writer (1250–1293)

Simon Doria (Italian: Simone, Occitan: Symon; fl. 1250–1293) was a Genoese statesman and man of letters, of the important Doria family. As a troubadour he wrote six surviving tensos, four with Lanfranc Cigala, one incomplete with Jacme Grils, and another with a certain Alberto. He was the son of a Perceval Doria, but not the Perceval Doria who was also a troubadour and probably his cousin.

== Identification ==
A Simon Doria is first recorded in 1253 at Tunis, carrying money and gold cloth. In 1254 and 1256, he is recorded as the husband of a Contessina, sister of Giacomino, of the house of the margraves of Gavi. In 1257, he accepted some money in mutuum. In 1267, he was absent from Genoa and represented there by a proxy. He was dead by 13 March 1275. Obviously a banker or merchant, this Simon is difficult to identify with the troubadour.

It is more probable that the troubadour was the Simon Doria who appears as an ambassador to Ceuta in a treaty of 6 September 1262. He was podestà of Savona in 1265–1266. He would then be one of many such podestà-troubadours of which the 13th century furnishes examples, many from Genoa. On 13 January 1265, this Simon was sent as an ambassador to Genoa to request Tommaso Malocello as the future podestà of Savona. In 1267, he was in Genoa again, and on 8 July he signed a document ratifying the peace between the Genoese and the Knights Templar under Thomas Berard. This Simon is last mentioned in 1293 when he was named podestà of Albenga.

A certain Simon Doria was in possession of a galley at Genoa in 1311. This was probably not the troubadour, but rather the same Simon as he who was ambassador to the pope in 1271 or 1281. There are thus probably three Simons of the Doria family. It is impossible to perfectly distinguish them, but the tenso with Alberto must have been written before 1250, based on a reference to the Emperor Frederick II in line 40, so the mid-century ambassador-podestà is most likely. The ship-owner of 1311 is almost impossible.

== Works ==
The tenso with Jacme Grils is preserved in two manuscripts: troubadour MS "O", which is a 14th-century Italian work on parchment, now "Latin 3208" in the Biblioteca Vaticana in Rome; and a^{1}, an Italian paper manuscript from 1589, now in the Biblioteca Estense in Modena. It is begun by Simon:

Segne'n Iacme Grils, e.us deman,
car vos vei larc e ben istan
e qar per ric pretz sobeiran
e per saver es mentaubutz,
qe me digatz per q'es perdutz
solatz e domneis mal volgutz.

Translation:

Lord Jacme Grils, I appeal to you,
as you are liberal and full of worth,
and rich, prestigious, elevated,
and wise in reputation,
tell me why worldly pleasure is lost
and gallantry accompanied by bad intentions?

The tenso with Alberto, possibly Alberto Fieschi, N'Albert, chauçeç la cal mais vos plaira, is found only in chansonnier called "troubadour manuscript T", numbered 15211 in the Bibliothèque nationale de France, where it is kept today. It is originally a late 13th-century Italian work. This tenso is the only datable work in Simon's oeuvre, thanks to his stanza #5:

Be.m meravigll, N'Albert, q'en tuta guisa,
no m'autreas del plac so q'eu vos dic,
qe qan ieu tenc midons senes camisa,
l'enperador non evei Frederic,
q'eu sai q'ell'es blancha e frescha e lisa;

Translation:

I am very astonished, Sir Albert, that in any case,
you do not concede the point I made to you,
that when I hold my lady without a shirt—
the emperor Frederick I do not envy—
I know she is white and fresh and pretty.

== Sources ==
- Bertoni, Giulio. I Trovatori d'Italia: Biografie, testi, tradizioni, note. Rome: Società Multigrafica Editrice Somu, 1967 [1915].
- Meneghetti, Maria Luisa. "Intertextuality and dialogism in the troubadours." The Troubadours: An Introduction. Simon Gaunt and Sarah Kay, edd. Cambridge: Cambridge University Press, 1999. ISBN 0-521-57473-0.
