= Lanfranc Cigala =

Italian composer

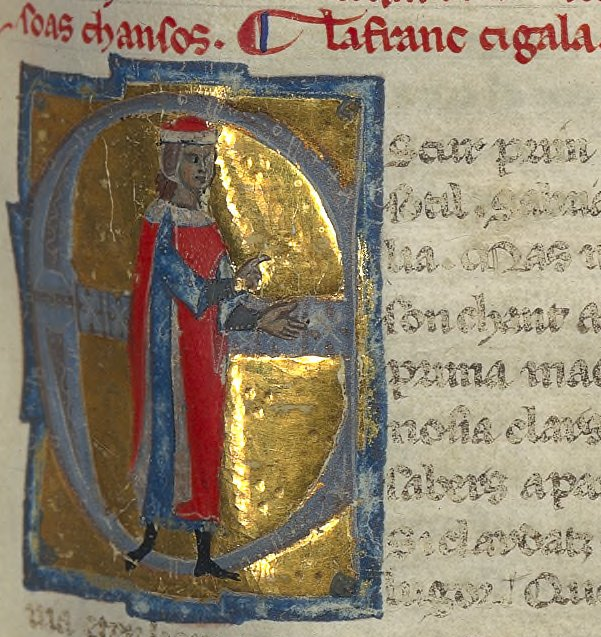
Lanfranc Cigala

Lanfranc Cigala (or Cicala) (Italian: Lanfranco, Occitan: Lafranc; fl. 1235–1257) was a Genoese nobleman, knight, judge, and man of letters of the mid thirteenth century. He remains one of the most famous Occitan troubadours of Lombardy. Thirty-two of his poems survive, dealing with Crusading, heresy, papal power, peace in Christendom, and loyalty in love. Lanfranc represented a tradition of Italian, Occitan-language trovatori who berated the Papacy for its handling of the Crusades.

Lanfranc's surviving corpus consists of thirty-two poems, including seven cansos of courtly love; four religious cansos; three sirventes; two crusading songs; and one planh. Among the thirty works attributed to him are nine tensos composed with other troubadours: four with Simon Doria and one each with Jacme Grils, Guilleuma de Rosers, Lantelm, Rubaut, and an otherwise unknown "Guilhem".

== Biography ==
Lanfranc was first mentioned in 1235 as a iudex (judge). In 1241, he was an ambassador from the Republic of Genoa to the court of Raymond Berengar IV of Provence, where he probably met Bertran d'Alamanon. In 1248, he was in Ceuta on a mercantile expedition. He was last mentioned alive in a document dated 16 March 1257, and he was recorded as deceased on 24 September 1258. Contrary to legend, he was not assassinated in Monaco in 1278.

== Religious poetry ==
Lanfranc was both a critic of the crusading policies of the Papacy and a supporter of the Albigensian Crusade. Echoing Innocent III's declaration that the Cathars were worse than the Saracens (1208), in his poem Si mos chans fos de joi ni de solatz (directed at the Count of Provence, then Charles of Anjou), Lanfranc wrote:

Coms Proensals, tost fora deliuratz
Lo Sepulchres si vostra manentia
Poges tan aut com lo prets qui vos guia, . . .
Mas del passar non ai cor que'us destregna,
C'obs es qe sai vostra valors pro tegna
A la gleiza d'aitals guerreiadors.
Ja de lai mar non queiratz Turcs peiors!

Count of Provence, would soon be freed
The [Holy] Sepulchre if your means
Corresponded to the esteem you inspire, . . .
But I do not have the heart to urge you to cross [the sea],
Because there is need for your valour to defend
The Church from its attackers.
On the other side of the sea there are not Turks who are worse!

This poem was written immediately after the loss of Jerusalem to the Mamelukes in 1244 and concurrent with the last Albigensian rising. More securely, it can be dated to between August 1244 and 17 July 1245. Lanfranc blamed the loss of Jerusalem on the lack of peace between Christian states, which was the first prerequisite of a successful Crusade in the East. Though he explicitly refused to lay the blame at the feet of either emperor (Frederick II) or pope (Innocent IV), his last words attack the pope's policy as war for profit.

In another poem, Quan vei far bon fag plazentier, written early in 1248, Lanfranc bemoaned the coming fall of Christianity with a metaphorical Sepulchre, which the Saracens, he said, had already destroyed. Christianity, therefore, was doomed and could not be recovered, because it had already been brought down by the infidels. This extreme metaphor was only part, however, of Lanfranc's desire to encourage peace amongst Christians for the sake of the survival of their religion.

Among Lanfranc's religious songs (cansos) are three on Marian themes, the most prominent of which is Gloriosa sainta Maria.

== Love poetry ==
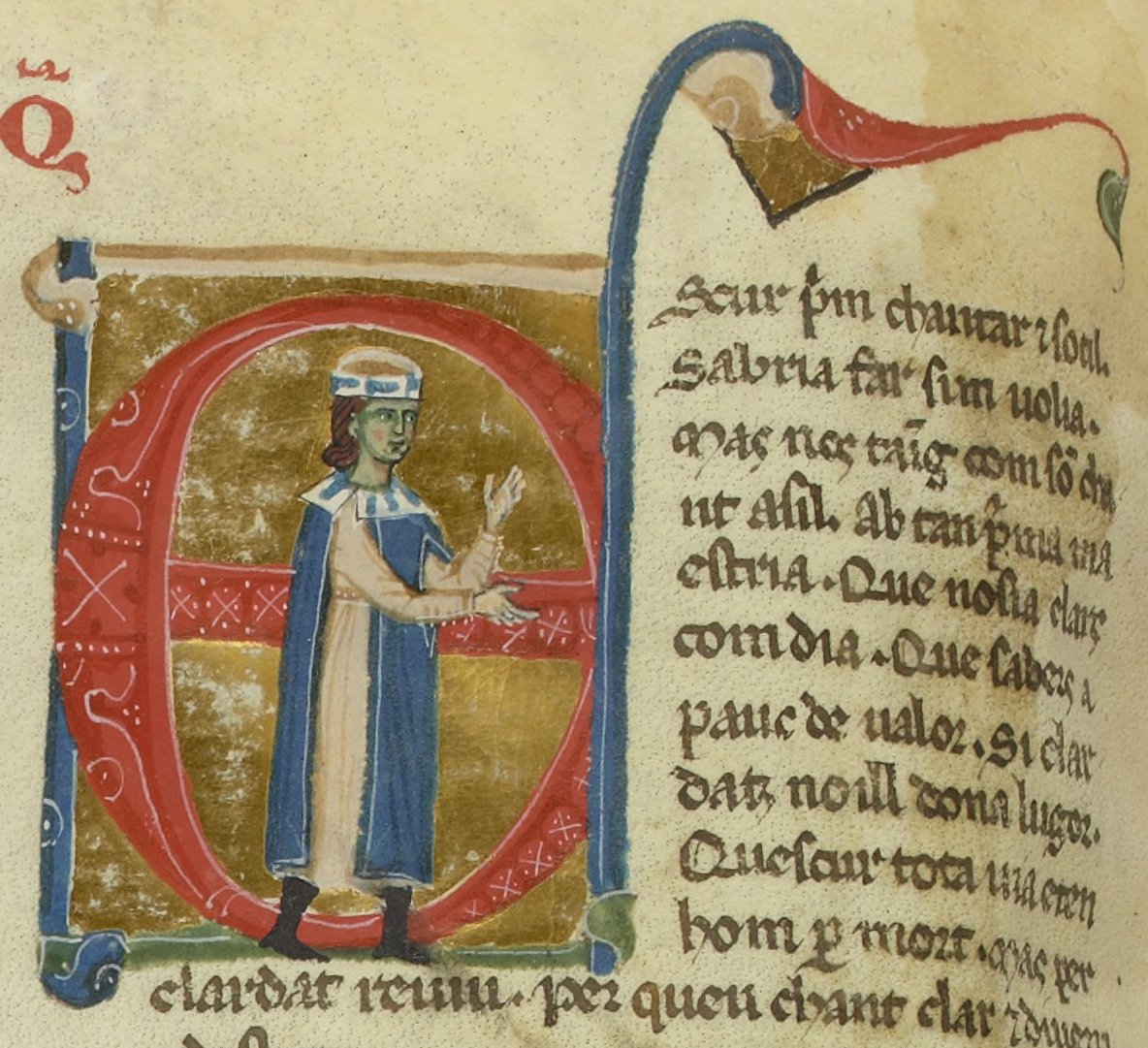
Lanfranc in a 13th-century chansonnier

Some of Lanfranc's work presaged the dolce stil nuovo, as when he wrote in his poem Quant en bon luec that ques amors pren en lejal cor naissenza (love is born in loyal hearts). His poetry idealised women and emphasised the need for loyalty. In another poem, Lanfranc praised the deceased countess of Este thus:

. . . la vol dieus en cel far regnar,
e si tot sai en reman dechaenza
li saint angel la'n portaran chantan.

Among the ladies (dompnas) Lanfranc celebrated in his poetry were Berlenda and one de Villafranca, on whose surname the poet composed many puns, as in Tan franc cors de dompn'ai trobat. This last woman may have been Alasia, the daughter of Guglielmo Malaspina. Lanfranc's only planh was composed for a lady named Luresana, whom Lanfranc called chan-plor. It begins Eu non chant ges per talan de chantar.

In Francesco da Barberino's Flores novellarum, a collection of Boccaccian novellas, there is a short biography of Lanfranc in which the troubadour is torn by the "duties of hospitality" and the "claims of lady-service". This novella is taken as an example of the early date at which the scene was transferred "from the street to the human soul."

== Other work ==
Lanfranc also wrote a violent sirventes beginning Estier mon grat mi fan dir vilanatge attacking Boniface II of Montferrat in July 1245. A lighter composition was Escur prim chantar e sotil, a defence of the trobar leu genre.
