= Tribolet =

Troubadour

The first stanza and the refrain (italics) from the translation of Paden and Paden:

A fucker who was not in love
With any girl but wanted to fuck
Always had a hard on, and was eager
To fuck any woman he could fuck.
He always had so strong an urge to fuck
That he was called Sir Fucker,
A fucker, alas! unhappy and sad,
And he said, "He dies badly and lives worse
Who doesn't fuck the one he loves."

Tribolet was an obscure troubadour, known only for one song, the obscene Us fotaires que no fo amoros. The song's rubric was read as t'bolet by Giulio Bertoni, who identified its composer as Tremoleta, but Alfred Jeanroy suggested the reading "Tribolet", which is widely accepted. He also suggested that the composition attributed to him is a parody of a piece now lost. The song is preserved in one chansonnier (G, folio 128) dating from the final third of the thirteenth century, the same period in which the song may have been written.

The phrase "the one he loves" (le qui ama) found in the ninth and eighteenth verses has caused some confusion, since le seems masculine: "the one [man] he loves." On this reading, it appears that the composer is a frustrated homosexual, who has plenty of sex with women but misses sex with the man he desires. It has been argued that an overt expression of homosexuality would have been impossible in a medieval court setting; the poet, however, may mean merely to hint at it.

Francesco Carapezza, however, argues that just as celes ("any woman") is an aberrant form of the usual celas, so le is just an unusual form of feminine la, in which case the poem is a comic exaggeration of heterosexual lust. According to C. H. Grandgent, the masculine form le may indicate influence from Old French, and François Zufferey has catalogued other instances of the normal masculine lo replaced by le in Old Occitan.
