= Tremoleta =

Tremoleta was a Catalan troubadour mentioned by the Monge de Montaudon in his satire of contemporary troubadours (c.1195). No works attributed to him survive, but many scholars have suggested identifying him with one of the known troubadours. The Monge provides the following information:

E.N Tremoleta.l catalas
que fai sonez levez e plas,
e sos chantars es de nien;
e tenh son cap con fai auras:
ben a trent'ans que for'albas
si no fos pel negre ongnimen.

And Lord Tremoleta the Catalan
who composes light, plain melodies,
and whose singing is nothing;
and whose head is dyed like the fools':
for a good thirty years he's been white-haired
except for that black ointment.

It is evident that Tremoleta was an old man when the Monge mocked him. If so, his composing career probably belongs to the mid-twelfth century. Manuel Milà i Fontanals, reading the first line as entre Moleta.l catalas, proposed that Tremoleta was the Mola who exchanged coblas in a tenso with Guilhem Raimon. In the eighteenth century, Giovanni Mario Crescimbeni, assuming Catala to be his surname, identified Tremoleta with Arnaut Catalan. Martí de Riquer i Morera rejects all these.

There is an obscene song, U fotaires que no fo amoros with a rubric Giulio Bertoni read as t'bolet and identified as referring to Tremoleta, but Alfred Jeanroy reads it as "Tribolet".
