= Trobairitz =

Occitan female troubadours of the 12th and 13th centuries

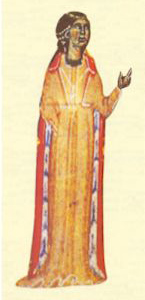
A medieval depiction of Comtessa de Diá

A chantar m'er
The only existing song by a trobairitz which survives with music, by Comtessa de Diá.

The trobairitz (Occitan pronunciation: [tɾuβajˈɾits]) were Occitan female troubadours of the 12th and 13th centuries, active from around 1170 to approximately 1260. Trobairitz is both singular and plural.

The word trobairitz is first attested in the 13th-century romance Flamenca. It comes from the Provençal word trobar, the literal meaning of which is "to find", and the technical meaning of which is "to compose". The word trobairitz is used very rarely in medieval Occitan, as it does not occur in lyrical poetry, grammatical treatises or in the biographies (vidas) of the trobairitz or troubadours. It does occur in the treatise Doctrina d'acort by Terramagnino da Pisa, written between 1282 and 1296. He uses it as an example of a word the plural and singular of which are the same.

Trobairitz composed, wrote verses, and performed for the Occitan noble courts. They are exceptional in musical history as the first known female composers of Western secular music; all earlier known female composers wrote sacred music. The trobairitz were part of courtly society, as opposed to their lower class counterparts the joglaressas. Although troubadours sometimes came from humble origins—Bernart de Ventadorn might have been the son of a castle's baker—the trobairitz were usually nobly born. The most important trobairitz were Alamanda de Castelnau, Azalais de Porcairagues, Maria de Ventadorn, Tibors de Sarenom, Castelloza, Garsenda de Proença, Gormonda de Monpeslier, and the Comtessa de Diá.

== Sources of information ==
There are very few extant sources of information on the individual trobairitz. Almost all information which exists about them come from their vidas (biographies) and razós (contextual explanations of the songs), the brief descriptions that were assembled in song collections called chansonniers. The vidas are notoriously unreliable, since they frequently consisted of little more than romanticized extrapolations from the poems of the trobairitz themselves. The names of about twenty female poets from the 12th and 13th centuries survive, with an estimated thirty-two works attributed to the trobairitz. There are about 5 percent as many trobairitz as there are troubadours, and the number of surviving compositions by trobairitz amounts to around 1 percent of those we have by the troubadours. The earliest surviving lyric written by a trobairitz is that of Bels dous amics, written by Tibors around 1150. Only one survives with musical notation intact, "A chantar" by Comtessa de Diá (see below). Some works which are anonymous in the sources are ascribed by certain modern editors to women, as are some works which are attributed to men in the manuscripts. For comparison, of the 460 male troubadours, about 2600 of their poems survive. Of these, about one in 10 survive with musical notation intact.Only two trobairitz have left us with more than one song apiece. Those two women are Comtessa de Dia, who leaves us with four cansos, and Castelloza, with three cansos and a fourth that is anonymous.

The early chansonniers did not separate the works of the male troubadours from those of the trobairitz. It was only in later Italian and Catalan chansonniers that the works of the trobairitz were found in different sections than those of their male counterparts.

== Position in medieval society ==
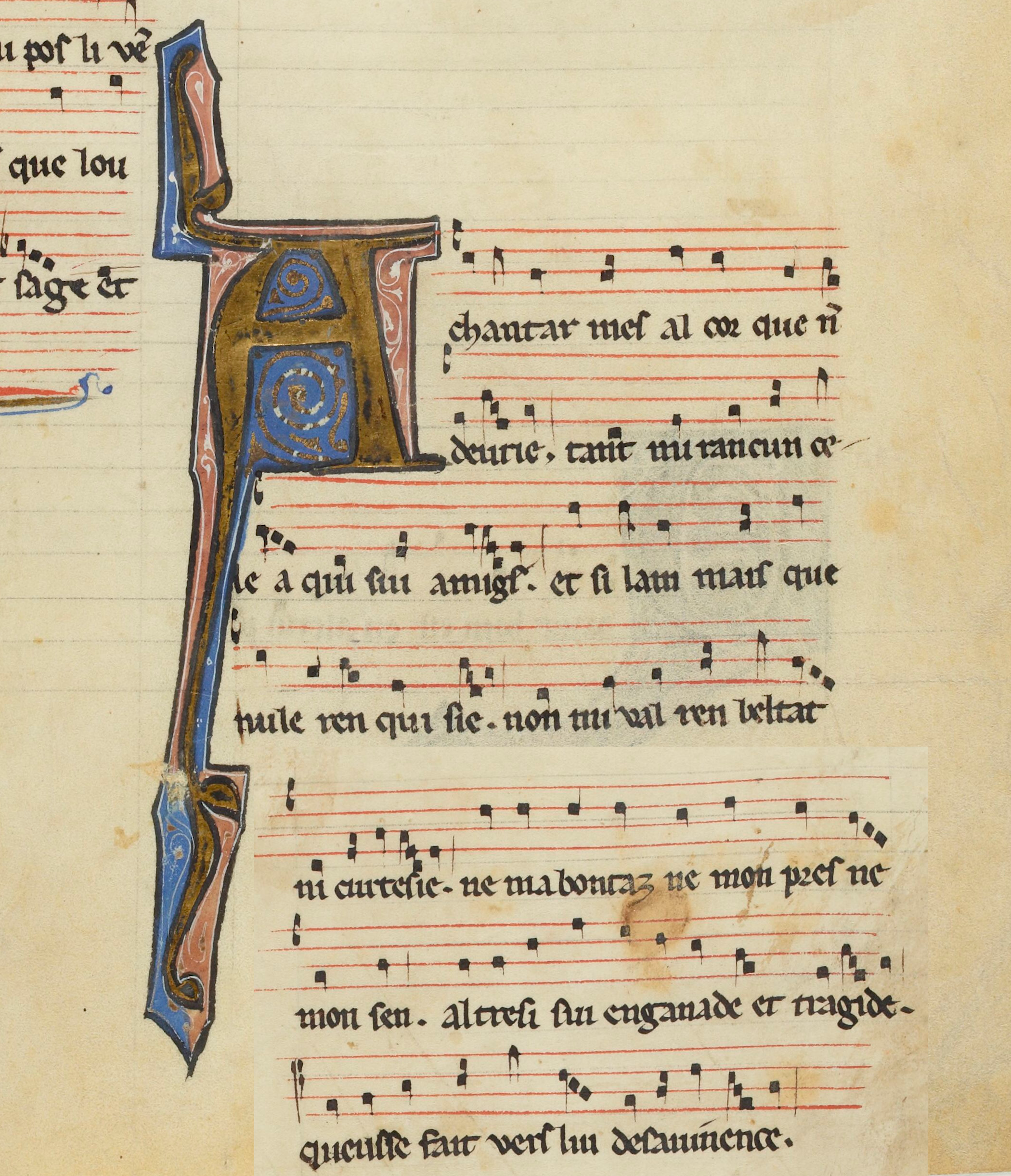
"A chantar" by Comtessa de Dia.

Throughout the 13th century, women of the court were expected to be able to sing, play instruments, and write jocs partis, or partimen (a debate or dialogue in the form of a poem). The cultivation of these womanly skills may have led to the writings of the trobairitz.

The trobairitz may also have arisen due to the power women held in southern France during the 12th and 13th centuries. Women had far more control over land ownership, and Occitan society was far more accepting of women than were most other societies of the time. During the Crusades many men were away, which left women with more administrative responsibility, and thus, power. Nevertheless, this society was not "feminist", nor was fin' amor, which exalted women while at the same time circumscribing many aspects of their lives and behavior.

There is difficulty in labeling the trobairitz as either amateurs or professionals. The distinction between these two roles was complicated in the medieval era, since professionals were generally lower class, and amateurs had as much time as professionals to devote to their craft. Joglaresse were lower class, professional composers far less respected than the trobairitz.

Both troubadours and trobairitz wrote of fin' amors, or courtly love. Women were generally the subject of the writings of troubadours, however: "No other group of poets give women so exalted a definition within so tightly circumscribed a context of female suppression." The tension between the suppression of women present in the poetry of the troubadours and similar themes in the poetry of the trobairitz is a major source of discussion for modern commentators. Trobairitz poetry pertaining to love tended to offer a less idealized conception of the subject than the poetry of their male counterparts, with a more conversational and less flourished style of writing intended to more closely emulate a more grounded vision of relationships. The trobairitz wrote in the canso (strophic song) and tenso (debate poem) genres. Besides cansos and tensos, trobairitz also wrote sirventes (political poems), planh (lament), salut d' amor (a love letter not in strophic form), alba (dawn songs), and balada (dance songs). Judging by what survives today, the trobairitz wrote no pastorelas or malmariee songs, unlike their troubadour counterparts Furthermore, in keeping with the troubadour tradition, the trobairitz closely linked the action of the singing to the action of loving. Comtessa de Dia demonstrates this in her poem Fin ioi me don'alegranssa, stating that "Fin ioi me dona alegranssa/per qu'eu chan plus gaiamen," translated as "Happiness brings me pure joy/which makes me sing more cheerfully."

== Attribution ==
The number of works attributed to the trobairitz is estimated at thirty-two songs, but ranges anywhere from 23 to 46. There are a number of reasons why an exact number is not known. In the courtly love tradition it was common for poems to be written as an exchange of letters, or a debate, as in a tenso. Some of these may have been originally written by one poet; however, some were originally an actual exchange of epistles, later gathered together in a manuscript. Some of these were between men, and some were between a man and a woman. Some modern editors attribute these solely to the man who originated the exchange, and some attribute them to both the man and the woman involved. There is a long history of attributing these solely to men, even when all evidence points to the contrary.

Since poetry was highly stylized, it is difficult to determine when a poet speaking as a woman actually was a woman, or a man speaking as a woman. This adds to the difficulty of attribution, especially of anonymous writers. There is some debate as to whether or not the poems by the trobairitz represent genuine feminine voices, since they worked within the highly circumscribed conventions of the troubadours. Matilda Bruckner suggests that the trobairitz "spoke in her own voice as channeled through the voices of many others". By manipulating the strict constructs of troubadour lyric, the trobairitz were able to create their own "fictions of the female voice".

There is one notable instance where clear attribution is given to a woman, Bieiris de Romans (also given as Beatritz), but the subject of the poem is another woman, Na Maria. In the poem "Na Maria" Beatritz expresses her love for Maria in the traditional fin' amors style, both in terms of physical longing and courtly admiration. This poem, if not clearly marked as by a woman, would be assumed to be by a man. Some controversy surrounds the works of the Bieiris de Romans, as scholars have suggested that her canso expresses "lesbian desire." The troubadour would typically speak to the domna (woman); the fact that the lyrical dialogue takes place exclusively between one woman and another is an extreme rarity.

== List of trobairitz ==
- Alais Iselda and Carenza: Na Carenza al bel cors avinen
- Alamanda de Castelnau: S'ie'us quier conseill, bel'amig'Alamanda
- Almucs de Castelnau and Iseut de Capio: Domna n'Iseutz, s'ieu saubes, Domna n'Almucs, si-us plagues
- Azalais d'Altier: Tanz salutz e tantas amors
- Azalais de Porcairagues: Ar em al freg temps vengut
- Beatriz de Diá: Fin joi me don'alegransa, Ab joy et ab joven m'apais, A chantar m'er de so qu'eu no volria, Estat ai en greu consirier
- Beatritz de Romans: Na Maria, pretz e fina valors
- Castelloza: Amics, s'ie-us trobes avinen, Ja de chanter non degr'aver talan, Mout aurez fag lonc estage, Per joi que d'amor m'avegna
- Clara d'Anduza: En greu esmay et en greu pessamen
- Felipa
- Garsenda de Proença: Vos que-m semblatz dels corals amadors
- Gaudairença: Coblas e dansas (not extant)
- Gormonda de Monpeslier: Greu m'es a durar
- Guillelma de Rosers: Na Guillelma, maint cavalher aratge
- Domna H.: Rofin, digatz m'ades de cors
- Lisa de Londres
- Lombarda: Nom volgr'aver per Bernard Na Bernarda
- Maria de Ventadorn: Gui d'Uisel, be.m pesa de vos
- Tibors de Sarenom: Bels dous amics, ben vos puosc en ver dir
- Ysabella

== See also ==
- List of troubadours and trobairitz
- Medieval music
- Provençal literature
- Marie de France – the only female composer from northern France: the northern term trouvère did not have a female equivalent (as trobairitz is the female equivalent of troubadour)
- List of medieval composers
- List of female composers
- Qiyan – female entertainers at Islamic courts, including Moorish ones
  - Medieval Arabic female poets
  - Andalusian classical music
