= Salut d'amor =

Type of Occitan poetry

A salut d'amor (Note: Alternatively spelled salu d'amors in Occitan.) (Occitan: [saˈlyd daˈmuɾ], Catalan: [səˈlud dəˈmoɾ, saˈlud daˈmoɾ]; "love letter", lit. "greeting of love") or (e)pistola ("epistle") was an Occitan lyric poem of the troubadours, written as a letter from one lover to another in the tradition of courtly love. Some songs preserved in the Italian Quattrocento and Cinquecento chansonniers are labelled in the rubrics as saluts (or some equivalent), but the salut is not treated as a genre by medieval Occitan grammarians. The trouvères copied the Occitan song style into Old French as the salut d'amour. There are a total of nineteen surviving Occitan saluts and twelve French ones, (Note: There are another seven French poems labelled complainte or requeste that may be classified as saluts.) with a Catalan examples (of the salutació amorosa) also.

The poetic form probably derives from the classical Latin love letter and through a blending of the ars dictaminis and the early Occitan canso. Occitan scholar Pierre Bec argued that the salut was tripartite, possessing an introduction, body, and conclusion. Christiane Leube believes that the Latin five-part division of salutatio, captatio benevolentiae, narratio, petitio, and conclusio formed the basis for the salut, but that the salutatio and captatio blended into one segment and all but the conclusio being less rigidly delineated. Dietmar Rieger regards the salut less as a letter than as a variant of the canso intended not to be sung in performance but to be read. The Occitan saluts do not have stanzas or refrains, but several French ones do (salut à refrains). Structurally they are usually octosyllabic rhyming couplets, but a few are hexasyllabic and Raimon de Miraval wrote a heterometric salut. They often end with a one-word verse, unrhymed with anything previous, that gives the addressee: Domna or Dompna.

The first salut d'amor was probably Domna, cel qe'us es bos amics, written by Raimbaut d'Aurenga and he served as a model for many later troubadours. Arnaut de Mareuil wrote five saluts, the most of any individual, and Don Alfred Monson has crowned him the maître incontesté du salut ("the uncontested master of the salut"). They served as a model for Amanieu de Sescars, who wrote two precisely datable saluts in 1278 and 1291. Falquet de Romans wrote a salut d'amor (epistola in the rubric) of 254 lines. The only female author of a salut was Azalais d'Altier. Her 101 verses of rhyming couplets were designed to reconcile two lovers and were addressed to a woman, possibly Clara d'Anduza. In French the only named author of a salut with refrains is Philippe de Rémi.

Destret d'emors mi clam a vos is a 708-line long anonymous Catalan salut.

== Sources ==
- Asperti, Stefano, ed. (2001). "Salut d'amor". Repertorio Informatizzato dell'antica Lirica Catalana (in Italian).
- Bertoni, Giulio (1915). I Trovatori d'Italia: Biografie, testi, tradizioni, note (in Italian). Rome: Società Multigrafica Editrice Somu (published 1967).
- Bruckner, Matilda Tomaryn; Shepard, Laurie; White, Sarah (1995). Songs of the Women Troubadours. New York: Garland Publishing.
- Chambers, Frank M. (1985). An Introduction to Old Provençal Versification. Diane.
- Klinck, Anne Lingard; Rasmussen, Ann Marie (2002). Medieval Woman's Song: Cross-Cultural Approaches. Philadelphia: University of Pennsylvania Press.
- Meyer, Paul (2000). Salut d'amor : nouvelles catalanes inédites (in French). Alacant: Biblioteca Virtual Joan Lluís Vives.
- Newcombe, T. H. (April 1972). "A Salut d'amour and its Possible Models". Neophilologus. 56 (2): 125–132. doi:10.1007/bf01515370. S2CID 162357458.
- Paden, William Doremus (January 1985). "Review of Grundriss der romanischen Literaturen des Mittelalters by Erich Köhler". Speculum. 60 (1): 153–155. doi:10.2307/2852154. JSTOR 2852154.
- Riquer, Martín de (1975). Los trovadores: historia literaria y textos (in Spanish). Vol. 3. Barcelona: Planeta.
