= Comtessa de Dia =

French artist (fl. c. 1175 or c. 1212)

Comtessa de Dia Béatrix de Viennois
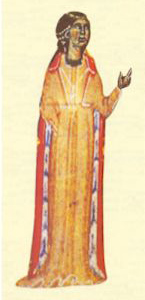
- Beatriz de Dia from Bibliothèque Nationale, MS cod. fr. 12473, 13th century

Background information
- Born: c. 1140; Die, Provence
- Origin: Provence
- Died: c. 1212 (aged 71–72) Provence
- Occupation: Trobairitz

The Comtessa de Dia (Countess of Die), possibly named Beatritz or Isoarda (fl. c. 1175 or c. 1212), was a trobairitz (female troubadour).

She is only known as the comtessa de Dia in contemporary documents, but was most likely the daughter of Count Isoard II of Diá (a town northeast of Montelimar now known as Die in southern France). According to her vida, she was married to William of Poitiers, but was in love with and sang about Raimbaut of Orange (1146-1173). Bruckner, Shepard, and White cite Angela Rieger's analysis of the songs, which associates them, through intertextual evidence, with the circle of poets composed of Raimbaut d'Aurenga, Bernart de Ventadorn, and Azalais de Porcairagues. Marcelle Thiébaux, and Claude Marks have associated her not with Raimbaut d'Aurenga but with his nephew or great nephew of the same name. If her songs are addressed to Raimbaut d'Aurenga's nephew Raimbaut IV, the Comtessa de Dia may have been urging the latter to support Raymond V of Toulouse.

It has been hypothesised that the Comtessa de Dia was in fact married to Guillem's son, Ademar de Peiteus, whose wife's name was Philippa de Fay, and that her real lover was Raimbaut de Vaqueiras.

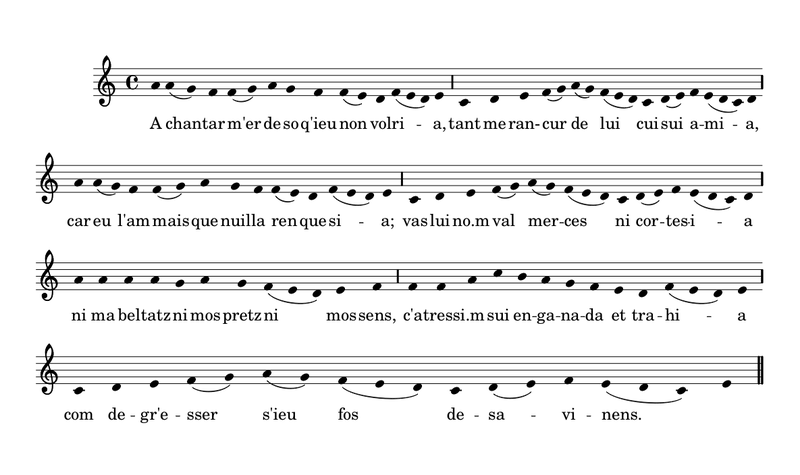
First verse of A chantar m'er de so qu'eu no volria in modern notation A chantar m'er de so qu'eu no volria The only existing song by a trobairitz which survives with music.

Five of the Comtessa's works survive, including 4 cansos and 1 tenson. Scholars have debated whether or not the Comtessa authored Amics, en greu consirier, a tenso typically attributed to Raimbaut d'Aurenga. One reason for this is the similarities between this composition and her own Estat ai en greu consirier. A second reason references the words in her vida, Et enamoret se d'En Rambaut d' Aurenga, e fez de lui mantas bonas cansos ("And she fell in love with Sir Raimbaut d'Aurenga, and made about him many good cansos").

A tenso between Giraut de Bornelh and Alamanda de Castelnau closely matches the structure of A chantar m'er de so qu'ieu non volria ("I must sing a song I'd rather not"). The phrase in it, vestida ni nuda ("dressed nor nude") echoes en lieig e quand sui vestida ("in bed and when I am dressed") in Estat ai en greu cossirier ("I dwell in sorrow"). The tenso may have been composed as a response to these songs.

Her song A chantar m'er de so qu'eu no volria in the Occitan language is the only canso by a trobairitz to survive with its music intact. The music to A chantar is found only in Le Manuscript du roi (f. 204r-v), a collection of songs copied around 1270 for Charles of Anjou, the brother of Louis IX.

Her extant poems are:

- Ab joi et ab joven m'apais
- A chantar m'er de so qu'ieu non volria
- Estât ai en greu cossirier
- Fin ioi me don'alegranssa

Typical subject matter used by Comtessa de Dia in her lyrics includes optimism, praise of herself and her love, as well as betrayal. In A chantar, Comtessa plays the part of a betrayed lover, and although she has been betrayed, continues to defend and praise herself. In Fin ioi me don'alegranssa, however, the Comtessa makes fun of the lausengier, a person known for gossiping, comparing those who gossip to a "cloud that obscures the sun." In writing style, Comtessa uses a process known as coblas singulars in A chantar, repeating the same rhyme scheme in each strophe, but changing the a rhyme each strophe. Ab ioi, on the other hand, uses coblas doblas, changing the rhyme sounds every two strophes, with a rhyme scheme of ab' ab' b' aab'. A chantar uses some of the motifs of Idyll II of Theocritus.

== In popular culture ==
She is the subject of a series of historical novels by the East German author Irmtraud Morgner.
