= Matilda Bruckner =

American scholar of medieval French literature

Matilda Tomaryn Bruckner is an American scholar of medieval French literature. She is an authority on French romance from the twelfth and thirteenth century, and author and editor of four books on romance, Chrétien de Troyes, and the women troubadours.

== Professional career ==
Bruckner received her A.B. from Bryn Mawr College and her M.Phil. and Ph.D. from Yale University. She taught at Princeton University for eight years, before accepting a position at Boston College in 1983, where she is professor emerita of French.

== Publications ==
- Chrétien Continued: A Study of the Conte du Graal and its Verse Continuations. New York: Oxford UP, 2009.
- Songs of the Women Troubadours, with Laurie Shepard and Sarah White. New York: Garland, 1995 (revised paperback edition 2000).
- Shaping Romance: Interpretation, Truth, and Closure in Twelfth-Century French Fictions. Philadelphia: U of Pennsylvania P, 1993.
- Narrative Invention in Twelfth-Century French Romance: The Convention of Hospitality (1160-1200). Lexington: French Forum, 1980.
