= Liber instrumentorum vicecomitalium =

The Liber instrumentorum vicecomitalium (Latin for "Book of the Instruments of the Viscounts"), sometimes called the Trencavel Cartulary (CT) or Cartulaire de Foix, is a high medieval cartulary commissioned by the Trencavel family. It preserves either 585 or 616–7 charters, the earliest of which dates to 1028 and the latest to 1214. The charters preserve a record of important feudal customs relating to the lands of the Trencavel, namely Albi, Agde, Béziers, Carcassonne, Nîmes, and Razès, all of which—save Carcassonne, which was a county—were viscounties, hence the cartulary's name. It is preserved in a twelfth-century manuscript, now kept with the Société Archéologique de Montpellier, where it is MS 10.

The compilation of the Liber began probably between 1186 and 1188, under the direction of Roger II Trencavel. It was completed in two stages and occupies 248 folios. The initial work was done by two scribes in a clear but highly abbreviate "proto-gothic documentary script", with a few decorated initials. In 1206 a few charters from the 1190s and the first years of the new century as well as some older documents from 1176–85 that were omitted in the initial compilation were added by a different scribe, using a smaller, rounder script. The final addition to the charter was a record of the surrender of Bernard Ato VI Trencavel to Simon de Montfort in 1214. The earliest eleventh-century charters generally concern Albi, the first Trencavel viscounty, but the majority of charters date to the mid–late twelfth century.

Of the charters 321 (55%) are oaths of fealty, 79 are "grants, recognitions, sales, mortgages" of fiefs, and 57 are convenientiae (accords). A small proportion of the oaths reference other convenientiae, but it is clear from the proportions of documents in the cartulary that "the power of the Trencavels rested on the oath."

Its organisation implies its use as an argument for Trencavel power. For example, it contains the supposed will of Roger the Old, the founder of the house. Its contents are geographically organised, arranged so as to present Trencavel lordship as regional and territorial. This form of organisation is mirrored in the contemporary Liber feudorum maior (and its companion piece, the Liber feudorum Ceritaniae) of Catalonia and the Liber instrumentorum memorialium of the Guilhems of Montpellier, with which it is often compared. The Trencavel Cartulary contains no documents concerning the church, secular or monastic, and does not appear to have been used on a regular basis by its commissioners. It was only periodically augmented, and seems more to have been a monument to Trencavel power.

== Editions ==
- Débax, Hélène (2025). Le cartulaire des Trencavel: Languedoc, XIe-XIIIe siècle. Paris: CTHS. ISBN 978-2-7355-0988-1..
- Dovetto, Joseph. 1997. Cartulaire des Trencavel: analyse détaillée des 617 actes, 957–1214. Centre de recherches et d'information historiques des conférenciers de la Cité. Carcassonne, 1977. B000WXR47M.
