= Liber feudorum maior =

Twelfth-century cartulary

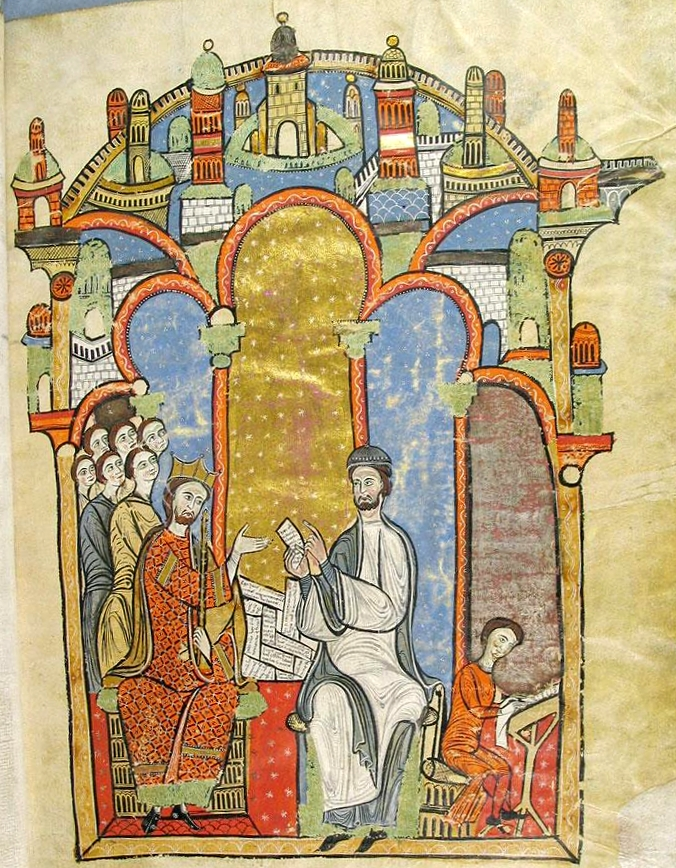
Ramon de Caldes (right) reading documents from the royal cartulary to Alfonso II. Some of the documents in the miniature can be identified with specific items in the cartulary. Frontispiece.

The Liber feudorum maior (or LFM, medieval Latin for "great book of fiefs"), originally called the Liber domini regis ("book of the lord king"), is a late twelfth-century illuminated cartulary of the Crown of Aragon. It was compiled by the royal archivist Ramon de Caldes with the help of Guillem de Bassa for Alfonso II, beginning in 1192. It contained 902 documents dating as far back as the tenth century. It is profusely illustrated in a Romanesque style, a rarity for utilitarian documents. The LFM is an indispensable source for the institutional history of the emerging Principality of Catalonia. It is preserved as a file in the Arxiu de la Corona d'Aragó (ACA), Cancelleria reial, Registres no. 1, in Barcelona.

== Manuscript history ==
Only 114 of the original 888 folios of the LFM remain, but only ninety-three of the original 902 documents have been completely lost, and thus a near-complete reconstruction of its contents remains possible. The prologue to the document, written by Ramon de Caldes, describes the work as being in duo volumina (two volumes), but its present division dates only from its re-binding in the nineteenth century. Whether the planned second volume was ever bound or even begun cannot be known. The original volumes sustained damage during the French Revolution and the French invasion of Spain, but their indices (one dating back to 1306) survived, as well as most of the parchment charters that were copied in the Liber. Its modern editor, Francisco Miquel Rosell, has reconstructed the order and rubrics of the documents. The folios were trimmed, however, eliminating any evidence of their earlier physical states.

Two smaller books of fiefs related to the LFM project are also preserved. The Liber feudorum Ceritaniae concentrates on Cerdany and Roussillon and may represent a failed initiative to create regional cartularies modelled on the LFM. The Liber feudorum formae minoris is a continuation of the LFM including documents from the early thirteenth century. Only two other secular cartularies survive from the same period: the Liber instrumentorum memorialium of the Lords of Montpellier and the Liber instrumentorum vicecomitalium of the Trencavels.

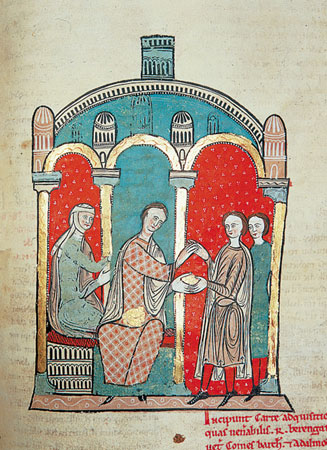
Ramon Berenguer I of Barcelona and his wife, Almodis de la Marche, counting out 2,000 ounces of gold coins as payment to William Raymond and Adelaide, count and countess of Cerdanya, in return for their rights over Carcassonne in 1067.

== Compilation ==
=== Dating ===
The compilation of the LFM was probably related to Alfonso's renewed drive to control the castellans of his domains. In 1178–80 he launched a series of lawsuits for power of access to various castles. The LFM was the product of intense research into the archives of the Crown in support of its claims. From 1171 to 1177 a review of the comital archives was found necessary for asserting the Alfonso's rights in the County of Carcassonne, which may have inspired archival reform. In 1178, 144 comital charters that had thitherto been in the hands of Ramon de Gironella, the count's vicar in Girona, were handed over to Guillem de Bassa; many of these later appeared in the LFM.

Accepting the prologue at face value, Francisco Miquel Rosell assumed that the work was presented to Alfonso II and that it was therefore completed before the count's death in 1196. Thomas Bisson has argued that the work was presented to Alfonso complete in August 1194 at the same ceremony where Ponç III de Cabrera came to terms with the king. Since Ramon de Caldes's work on the LFM is last recorded in April that year, it is assumed that he pushed himself to complete the work in the following months. A third line of argument, pursued by Anscari Mundó, sees the LFM as complete by 1192, when the latest of its charters was issued. Three charters from the final four years of Alfonso's reign are contained in the LFM, but in a hand distinct from that of its two main scribes. All of these pertain to Ponç de Cabrera, his capitulation and his oath of fealty to Peter II in April 1196. Since the last document would have been added only after Alfonso's death, it is possible that the others were added simultaneously, that the completion of the cartulary was unrelated to Ponç's settlement, and that the work was in the main finished by 1192. Since documents of an earlier date than November 1192 appear to have been inscribed on blank folios after documents from that year, it is probable that 1192 represents the "finish" date of the original version (or the date of presentation).

It is also possible that the work that had begun as early as 1178 was renewed sometime around 1190–94. Bisson connects any renewed effort on the part of Ramon de Caldes before his retirement from court in late 1194 with a series of challenges to the authority of Alfonso II. In February 1194 Berenguer, Archbishop of Tarragona, was assassinated by Guillem Ramon II de Montcada, which to Bisson indicates the weakness of the Peace and Truce of God at that time and since 1190, when the baronage had first rejected it.

According to Lawrence McCrank, the LFM was unfinished at the king's death in 1196 and at Ramon's in 1199. The prologue was written in anticipation and a second volume was never begun, only planned. Both Bisson and Adam Kosto agree that the work was completed in 1192 and presented in 1194, but that it was never a "completed", rather the "closing of the selection of instruments" was the "beginning of continuous work".

[H]is instrumentis ad memoriam revocatis, unusquisque ius suum sortiatur, tum propter eternam magnarum rerum memoriam, ne inter vos et homines vestros, forte oblivionis occasione, aliqua questio vel discordia posset oriri.

[W]ith these instruments recalled to mind, each person should receive his due, and that on account of the undying recollection of great matters, no dispute or conflict should arise between you and your men because of forgetfulness.

—Ramon de Caldes explaining the function of the LFM in the prologue

=== Purpose ===
The LFM was treated by its modern editor, Rosell, as little more than a written record of the aggrandisement of the domain of the counts of Barcelona. Lawrence McCrank connected the beginnings of the cartulary enterprise with the Treaty of Cazola in 1179, by which Alfonso secured recognition of his rights to Valencia by Alfonso VIII of Castile. On this view, Alfonso "slowed the Reconquest" in order to concentrate on unifying his various realms into a single crown. Critiquing this view, Kosto points out that while papal bulls and treaties with the military orders regarding Aragon are found at the start of the cartulary, the relative dearth of charters relating to castleholding and landholding in Aragon suggests that the unification of Aragon and Catalonia juridically (i.e. more than symbolically) was not high on the minds of the compilers or their patron.

The LFM introduced no "new principles of feudal organization", but it does represent "a more abstract notion of comital and royal power". It has been compared to the Usatges de Barcelona as a failure in "practical or bureaucratic terms". It is essentially an expression of power, conceived territorially and principally with regards to Catalonia. The cartulary is not a record of the union of Catalonia with Aragon. Rather, it is a record of a vast new authority including Aragon, parts of Occitania (Carcassonne, Razès, Béziers, and the County of Provence), and all the Catalan counties, including Ausona, Barcelona, Besalú, Cerdanya, Girona, Roussillon, and Pallars Jussà, which were all possessed by Alfonso II, as well as the Empúries and Urgell, which were not. Bisson writes that in the LFM "feudal principles, applied to serve administrative [...] needs, remained subordinated to a conception of territorial sovereignty," yet he also says that the LFM was "exclusively a land book concerned with proprietary or reversionary right [and not] concerned with any systematic effort to strengthen suzerain rights or vassalic obligations." Kosto, to an extent, disagrees, arguing that the work is a combination of land book and case book, in which some charters are presented to explain the proper working of the feudal system. The rubrics and section headings are evidence of the ambiguity of Alfonso's position and that of the various regions. While Aragon is termed a regnum (kingdom, realm), Cerdanya and Roussillon are comitati (counties), Tarragona is listed as a civitas (city), and Provence and the County of Melgueil are not described. In other cases charters are named for the lord that issued them or confirmed them. .

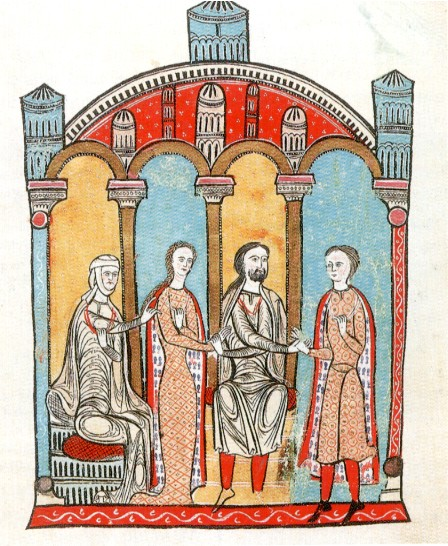
Ermengard of Carcassonne, standing between her mother, Cecilia of Provence, and her father, Bernard Ato IV of Nîmes, is being betrothed to Gausfred III of Roussillon.

== Contents ==
=== Text ===
The documents in the LFM are organised by county, viscounty, or lineage (usually associated with a given castle or estate). Sometimes sections are indicated by rubrics. Sections and subsections were separated by blank folios, which Rosell thought were intended for earlier documents that were yet to be retrieved, but which others suggested were intended for expansion. In fact both new documents and earlier ones were added to blank folios. Within a given subsection the documents are usually ordered chronologically, and sometimes grouped (by blank folios) into periods.

A comital archive for the counts of Barcelona is only mentioned for the first time in 1180. Ramon de Caldes refers to omnia instrumenta propria et inter vos vestrosque antecessores ac homines vestros confecta ("all of your own documents and those drawn up between you and your ancestors and your men"), but the location of these documents is uncertain. The archive may have been centralised yet itinerant, or perhaps there were subsidiary archives at the various comital centres. The archive sent by Ramon de Gironella to Guillem de Bassa contained mostly documents pertaining to the County of Girona, for instance. The copyists of the LFM may have made use of an itinerant commission which collected or copied charters throughout Alfonso's domains, where needed. At least two charters in the LFM were definitely from outside sources: a grant by Raymond Berengar IV of Barcelona to Santa Maria de l'Estany in 1152 and a privilege of Charlemagne held at the monastery of Sant Llorenç del Munt. Further, 109 documents from the archives of the County of Pallars Jussà, acquired by Alfonso on 27 May 1192, were incorporated into the LFM almost immediately.

=== Illustration ===
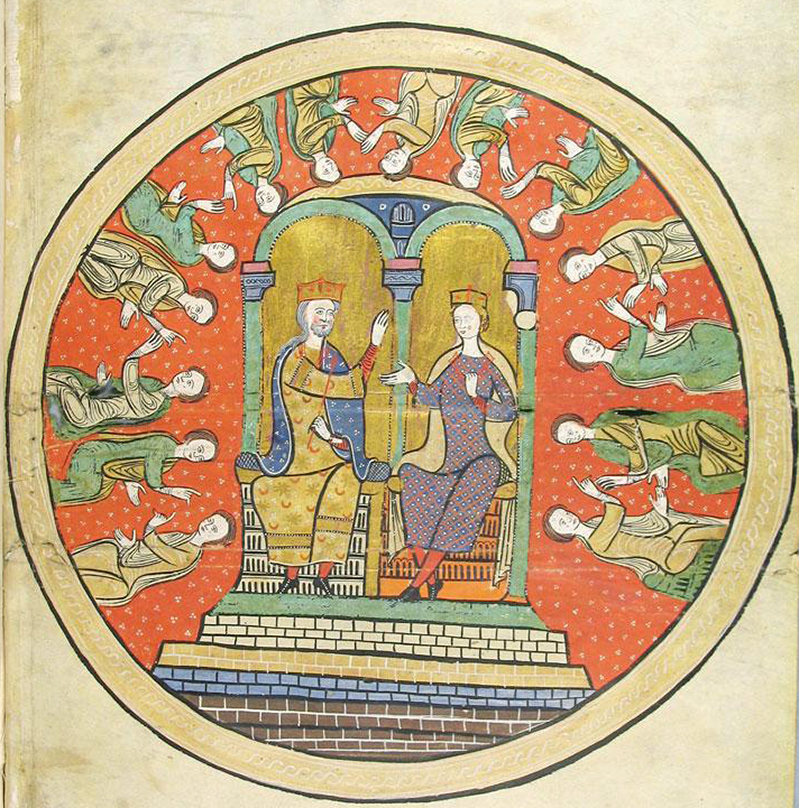
Alfonso II and Sancha (sometimes said to be Raymond Berengar IV of Barcelona and Petronila of Aragon) surrounded by the ladies of their court.

Though it is rare as an example of an illuminated cartulary, the LFM is not the only example from the twelfth century, nor even from Spain. In fact, there exist four Spanish exemplars from the first half of the century: the Libro de los testamentos of the cathedral of Oviedo, Tumbo A from Santiago de Compostela, the Libro de las estampas of León, and the Becerro antiguo of the monastery of Leire. French examples exist from the same time period as the LFM: from Vierzon (c.1150), Mont-Saint-Michel (c.1160), and Marchiennes (c.1195).

Kosto has identified two styles and thus two hands at work in the miniatures of the LFM, one conservative and local, the other expert and international. Joan Ainaud dated the painting to the first quarter of the thirteenth century (after the completion of the text), but it was probably planned from the start.

The LFM preserves 79 images, though there were once more. Many of the images are connected with specific charters in the cartulary and depict various specific actions of feudal politics. They are among the earliest depictions of the act of homage (hominium), of the placing of a vassals hands between those of his lord. Oaths and pledges are depicted by raised right hands and agreements by hand-holding. The Treaty of Zaragoza (1170) is depicted by Alfonso II and his Castilian counterpart, Alfonso VIII, as sitting on two thrones, holding hands. All these images reinforced the royal conception of power and the subordination of vassals.

The first two images of the cartulary, however, are counter the hierarchical spirit of the rest. In the first, Alfonso and Ramon, seated at equal levels, with a scribe at work in the background, gesture towards a pile of charters. The charters are the centre of attention. The king is depicted as working (administering his realm). In the second, the king and the queen, Sancha of Castile, are surrounded by a circular array of seven pairs of noblewomen engaged in conversation. The king and queen, too, appear engaged in conversation. The image is probably a depiction of the court and its culture, which was a home to many troubadours.
