= Folquet de Marselha =

Troubadour and bishop of Toulouse (c. 1150–1231)

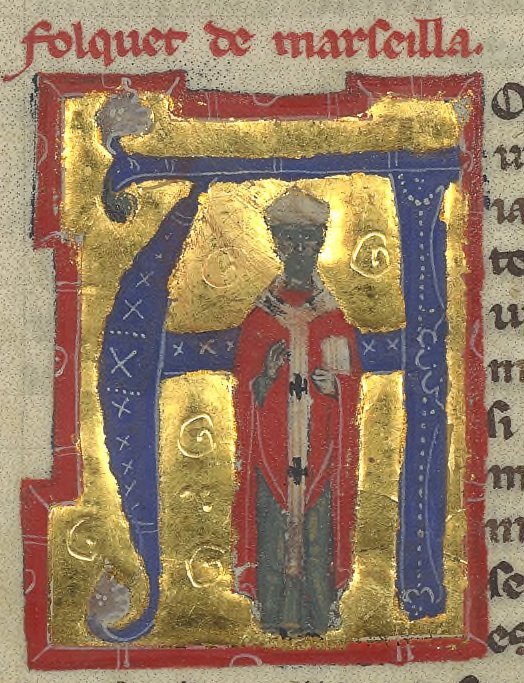
Folquet de Marseilla in a 13th-century chansonnier, depicted in his episcopal robes

Folquet de Marselha (alternatively Folquet de Marseille, Foulques de Toulouse, Fulk of Toulouse; c. 1150 – 25 December 1231) came from a Genoese merchant family who lived in Marseille. He was a celebrated troubadour who, after a religious conversion, became a Cistercian monk and later the bishop of Toulouse.

== Troubadour ==
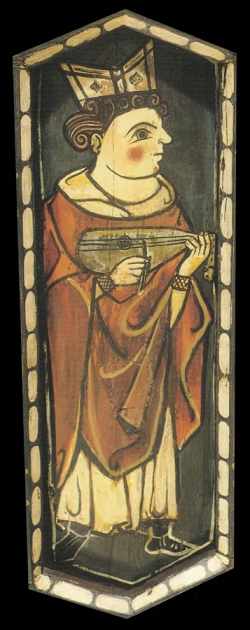
Painting from Teruel Cathedral of musician clergy, possibly Folquet de Marseille

Initially famed as a troubadour, he began composing songs in the 1170s and was known to Barral of Marseille, Richard the Lionhearted, Alfonso VIII of Castile, Raymond-Roger of Foix, Alfonso II of Aragon and William VIII of Montpellier. Primarily famed for his love songs, which were lauded by Dante, he wrote 14 surviving cansos, one tenson, one lament, one invective, three crusade songs and possibly one religious song (although its authorship is disputed). Like many other troubadours, he was later credited by the Biographies des Troubadours with having conducted love affairs with the various noblewomen about whom he sang (allegedly causing William VIII to divorce his wife, Eudokia Komnene), but all evidence suggests that Folquet's early life was considerably more prosaic and in keeping with his status as a wealthy citizen. A contemporary, John of Garland, later described him as "renowned on account of his spouse, his progeny, and his home", all marks of bourgeois respectability.

== Bishop ==
Folquet's life and career abruptly changed around 1195 when he experienced a profound religious conversion and decided to renounce his former life. He joined the strict Cistercian Order, entering the monastery of Thoronet (Var, France), and appears to have placed his wife and two sons in monastic institutions as well. He soon was elected its abbot, which allowed him to help found the sister house of Géménos to house women, quite possibly including his wife.

Folquet was elected Bishop of Toulouse in 1205, after two Cistercian Papal legates had been sent to the region to reform it. Pope Innocent III was particularly concerned by the prevalence of both heresy and episcopal corruption in the Languedoc and used the Cistercians to combat both. The legates had deposed the previous Bishop, Raimon de Rabastens, and were probably instrumental in arranging Folquet's nomination for the position.

As Bishop of Toulouse, Folquet (now traditionally referred to by his proper name, Foulques, Fulk, or Folc, instead of the diminutive Folquet) took a very active role in combatting heresy. Throughout his episcopal career he sought to create and encourage outlets for religious enthusiasm that were Catholic in an effort to woo believers away from heresy (primarily identified as Cathar and Waldensian). In 1206 he created what would become the convent of Prouille to offer women a religious community that would rival (and, where necessary, replace) those of the Cathars. He participated in the initial preaching mission of Saint Dominic that was led by Dominic's superior, Bishop Diego of Osma. He continued to support this new form of preaching after Bishop Diego's death by backing Dominic and his followers, eventually allotting the nascent Dominicans property and a portion of the tithes of Toulouse to ensure their continued success.

== Proponent of the Albigensian Crusade ==
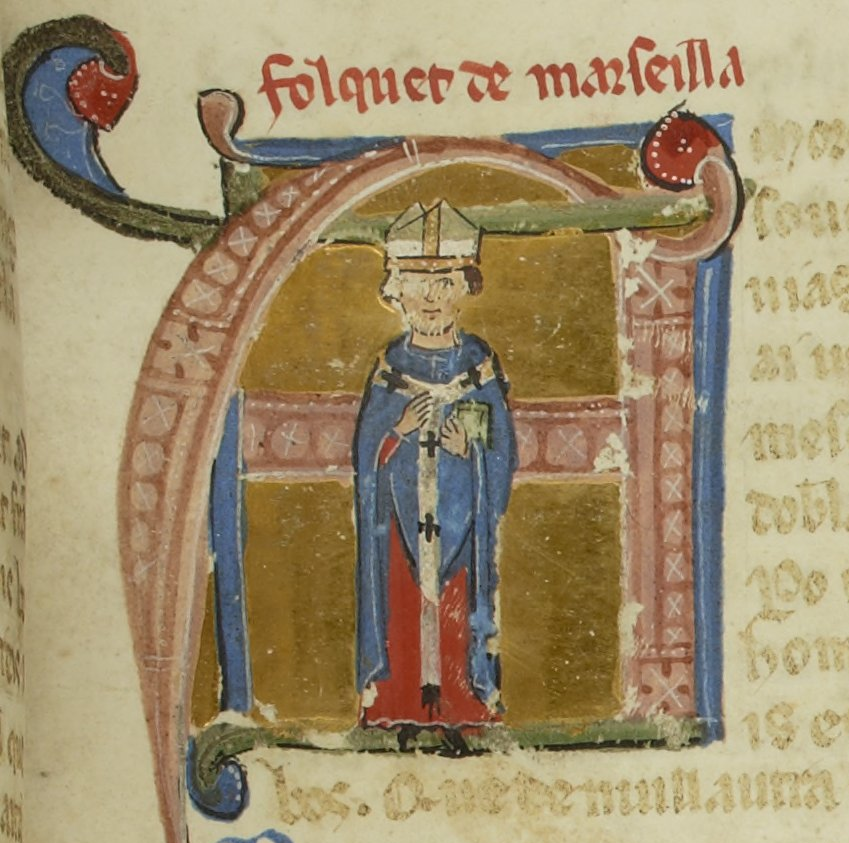
Folquet depicted holding a bible in BnF ms. 854 folio 61

Bishop Foulques had tumultuous relations with his diocese, in part due to his support of the Albigensian Crusade, which was popularly perceived as a war of foreign aggression against the region. But he also took sides in factional disputes among the Toulousians, and between them and the Count, which predated the crusade and coloured how he was perceived.

He had gone to Rome to advise Pope Innocent III about the situation in his diocese in March 1208 when the pope decided to call the crusade and excommunicate the Count Raymond VI of Toulouse for the assassination of the papal legate Pierre de Castelnau. As the Count worked to lift his excommunication and avoid losing his land to the crusaders, Bishop Foulques supported a faction of Toulousians known as The White Confraternity, which led to armed conflict within Toulouse. He also worked with the papal legate Arnaud Amalric to lift restrictions on Toulouse, and to preach against usury in the surrounding countryside. He traveled in the North of France preaching the crusade.

After it became clear in 1211 that the Count of Toulouse would not be able to protect his lands from the crusade, or get the excommunication of himself lifted, Count Raymond confronted the bishop, threatening to kill him if he did not leave Toulouse. He fled and joined the crusading army at Lavaur. After that town was taken by the crusaders, he demanded that the Toulousians break with their count or suffer the same fate. When they declined, he ordered all the clergy to leave the city and the crusading army attacked.

After the crusaders failed to take Toulouse, he spent the next three years "in exile." He traveled through the North of France preaching the Crusade in 1211 with Guy of les Vaux-de-Cernay . and later to Paris and the Low Countries in 1213. He also traveled with the crusading army in the South, participated in several church councils, and supported the nascent nunnery of Prouille which he had founded and which received many grants of appropriated land from crusaders.]

He took a highly visible and prominent role when the crusaders confronted the much larger army of the King of Aragon at Muret in 1213, blessing the crusaders and offering up prayers for their success. The Toulousians violently rejected his offers to negotiate a surrender and even after they were defeated in battle, would not reconcile with the church .

He finally returned to his see after the Council of Montpellier in January 1215 gave him the Toulousian residence of the count, the Château Narbonnais, and assigned secular rule to Simon de Montfort. He began rebuilding the catheral and installing the supports for what became the Dominican Order. But he, and Simon de Montfort, faced resistance. After an unsuccessful revolt by the Toulousians in 1216, he tried to relinquish his position, claiming that it was impossible to manage the diocese, but his requests to the pope were refused. In 1217 the Toulousians successfully rebelled when both he and Simon de Montfort were away, and welcomed their former count, Raymond VI into Toulouse.

In October 1217, when Simon was besieging Toulouse once more, he sent a group of sympathisers to Paris to plead for the help of king Philippe-Auguste. This group included Simon's wife, the countess Alix de Montmorency, as well as Foulques. They began their journey clandestinely, "through the forest", to avoid attacks by faidits (knights dispossessed by the Crusaders) They returned more flamboyantly, in May 1218, bringing a party of new Crusaders including the dashing Amaury de Craon. When, on 25 June 1218, Simon de Montfort was killed on the battlefield, Foulques was among the clerics who received his body.

Foulques spent much of the following decade outside his diocese, assisting the crusading army and the Church's attempts to bring order to the region. He was at the Council of Sens in 1223.

After the Peace of Paris finally ended the crusade in 1229, Foulques returned to Toulouse and began to construct the institutions that were designed to combat heresy in the region. He helped to create the University of Toulouse and administered the newly created Episcopal Inquisition. He died in 1231 and was buried, beside the tomb of William VII of Montpellier, at the abbey of Grandselves, near Toulouse, where his sons, Ildefonsus and Petrus had been abbots.

== Notes ==
=== Sources ===
- Hasenohr, Geneviève; Zink, Michel, eds. (1964). Dictionnaire des lettres françaises: Le Moyen Age. Fayard.
- Schulman, Nicole M. (2001). Where Troubadours Were Bishops : the Occitania of Folc of Marseille, 1150–1231. New York: Routledge. ISBN 978-1-136-06490-6. OCLC 861692073.
- Sibly, W. A.; Sibly, M. D. (2003). The Chronicle of William of Puylaurens: The Albigensian Crusade and its Aftermath. Woodbridge: Boydell. ISBN 0-85115-925-7.
