= William IX of Montpellier =

William IX (Occitan Guilhem or Guillem) was the lord of Montpellier from 1202 until 1204. He was the last lord of the Guilhem lineage.

William IX was the eldest son of William VIII of Montpellier. His mother, Agnes (Spanish Inés), was related to the kings of Aragon. She was William VIII's second wife, married in 1187 after he left his first wife, Eudokia Komnene, who was the mother of his daughter and heiress, Mary. William VIII struggled to get the church, the townspeople and neighbouring lords to recognise the legitimacy of his second marriage and his son. William IX had five full brothers and two full sisters.

William IX succeeded his father in 1202 in accordance with the latter's final will and testament (dated that same year) and in contravention of the marriage treaty with Eudokia. William's government included many features, such as a Council of Fifteen, that were new in Montpellier. These had been created by his father in an effort to get the townspeople to accept his chosen heir. In 1204, Mary married the divorced King Peter II of Aragon, who thus obtained a claim on Montpellier. The townspeople rebelled against William's government and drove him and the council from the town. They invited Peter and Mary to take over the lordship. After he was exiled from Montpellier, William IX held the castle of Paulhan until his death.

Both Peter II's divorce case and the case of William IX's legitimacy were litigated in Rome in 1212–13. Pope Innocent III decided in favour of Peter, legitimising his marriage to Mary and their children, in January 1213. He decided against William, rejecting his father's marriage to Agnes as adulterous and declaring him illegitimate, in April 1213.

== Notes ==
Preceded by William VIII	Lord of Montpellier; 1202–1204	Succeeded by Mary
