= Peire Vidal =

12th-century Occitan troubadour

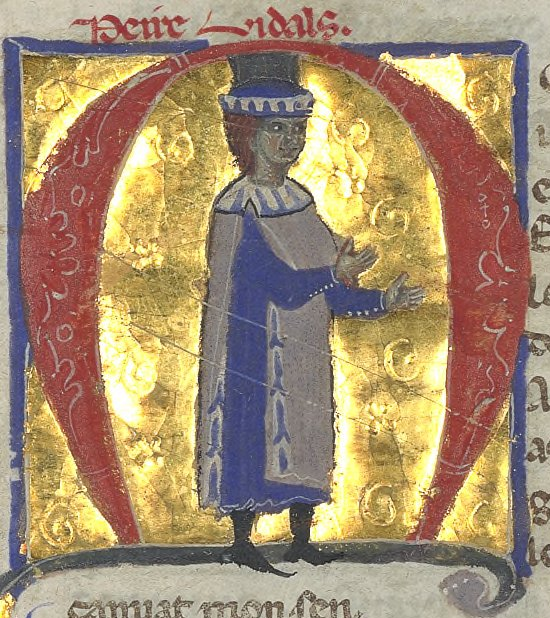
Peire Vidal (his name is written at top) as portrayed in a 13th-century chansonnier.

Peire Vidal (fl. 12th century) was an Old Occitan troubadour. Forty-five of his songs are extant. The twelve that still have melodies bear testament to the deserved nature of his musical reputation.

There is no contemporary reference to Peire outside of his works of poetry. His vida (a short Occitan biography)—composed about fifty years after his death—and two razos (short commentaries on specific poems) are probably fictionalised works built on episodes from his poems. Only the opening line of the vida is probably reliable. It says that he "was from Toulouse, the son of a furrier": si fo de Tolosa, fils d'un pelissier. The fur and leather industry was well established in Toulouse, near the church of Saint Pierre des Cuisines, in the twelfth century. The rest of the vida is mostly invention based on Peire's poems, but it does contain the only reference to Peire having a wife:

...he took a Greek woman who had been given to him in marriage in Cyprus; and he claimed that she was the niece of the Emperor of Constantinople and through her he should have the right to the Empire. He gathered together all he could obtain to make ships, in order to set out to conquer the empire.

This fantastic story may be based on the historical marriage of Thierry of Flanders and the Damsel of Cyprus, who together laid claim to Cyprus in 1203.

Peire with his wife and a crown, as depicted in chansonnier A

Peire started his career, along with the troubadour Bernart de Durfort, at the court of Count Raymond V of Toulouse around 1176. He continued there until 1190, when he left to seek another patron after quarrelling with the count. Many of his early poems were addressed to Vierna de Porcellet, a relative of the count's. In some poems Peire, Vierna and Raymond form a love triangle. From Toulouse Peire went to the court of King Alfonso II of Aragon, where he remained in good favour until the king's death in 1196. Afterward he continued to occasionally visit the court of Alfonso's son, Peter II. In the rivalry between the rulers of Toulouse and Aragon, Peire took the side of Aragon. He visited the court of King Alfonso VIII of Castile at Toledo in 1195 and intermittently thereafter until 1201. He also stayed for a time at the court of King Alfonso IX of León, where the Galician–Portuguese lyric was favoured over the Occitan. Among Peire's many lesser patrons were Lord William VIII of Montpellier and his wife, the Byzantine princess Eudokia Komnene. (William was both a vassal of Peter II and his father-in-law.) Peire attended the Aragonese court during some of its visits to Narbonne, but although the ruling viscountess of that city, Ermengarde, was a notable patron of troubadours (like Azalais de Porcairagues) there is no indication that she patronised Peire or that he wrote songs for her.

Peire was also associated with Raimon Jaufre Barral, viscount of Marseille and brother-in-law of Vierna. Barral's son-in-law, Hugh of Baux, was a patron of Peire Vidal. The troubadour Blacatz, a relative of Hugh's of modest wealth, was also a patron.

Peire Vidal is referenced in Ezra Pound's poem Pierre Vidal Old, and Ford Madox Ford's novel The Good Soldier, as well as in Leopold von Sacher-Masoch's novella Venus in Furs. George W. Cronyn wrote a fictionalized biography of Vidal entitled The Fool of Venus: The Story of Peire Vidal (1934), which contains many lines from his poetry, some in Provençal, some in English translation.
