= William III, Lord of Montpellier =

William III (or in Occitan: Guilhem III) was the Lord of Montpellier from 1025 until his death in 1058. He was the son of William II and husband of Beliardis. His son and successor was William IV. He is the last of the "shadowy" lords of Montpellier, none of whose charters are conserved in the family cartulary, the Liber instrumentorum memorialium.

Titles of nobility
Preceded by William II	Lord of Montpellier; 1025–1058	Succeeded by William IV
