= Liber feudorum =

Liber feudorum may refer to:

- Book of Fees, a list of fiefs compiled c. 1302 for the use of the English Exchequer
- Liber feudorum maior, a list of fiefs held from the Crown of Aragon, compiled c. 1192
- Liber feudorum formae minoris, a continuation of the Liber feudorum maior
- Liber feudorum Ceritaniae, a list of fiefs held from the County of Cerdagne, compiled in the early 13th century
- Libri feudorum, a Lombard treatise on feudal law in two volumes
