= Bernat de Puigcercós =

Bernat de Puigcercós (O.P.) (...Girona – 1342) was a Catalan Dominican friar that lived during the 14th century. He was general Inquisitor of the Crown of Aragon.

== Works ==
He wrote a short treatise in Latin called Quaestio disputata de licitudine contractus emptionis et venditionis censualis cum conditione revenditionis (Disputed Matter on the Lawfulness of the purchase and sale contract of censals with the condition of reselling). It was transcribed and published by Josep Hernando i Delgado. The text that was used was taken from the manuscript nº 42 of the Monastery of Sant Cugat, that can be found in the General Archive of the Crown of Aragon. In this short treatise he accepts the lawfulness of the censals and violaris, that would be the right to get an income after for a certain period, or even for a lifetime after paying a certain amount of money. They were very common in Catalonia and the Crown of Aragon during the Middle Ages, and this matter was very discussed in medieval Canon law.

This work had a decisive influence in Francesc Eiximenis' opinion in favour of the censals and violaris lawfulness in his Tractat d'usura (Treaty on usury).
