= Cartulary of Mont-Saint-Michel =

Illuminated manuscripts from Normandy

- Bibliothèque Intercommunale, Avranches
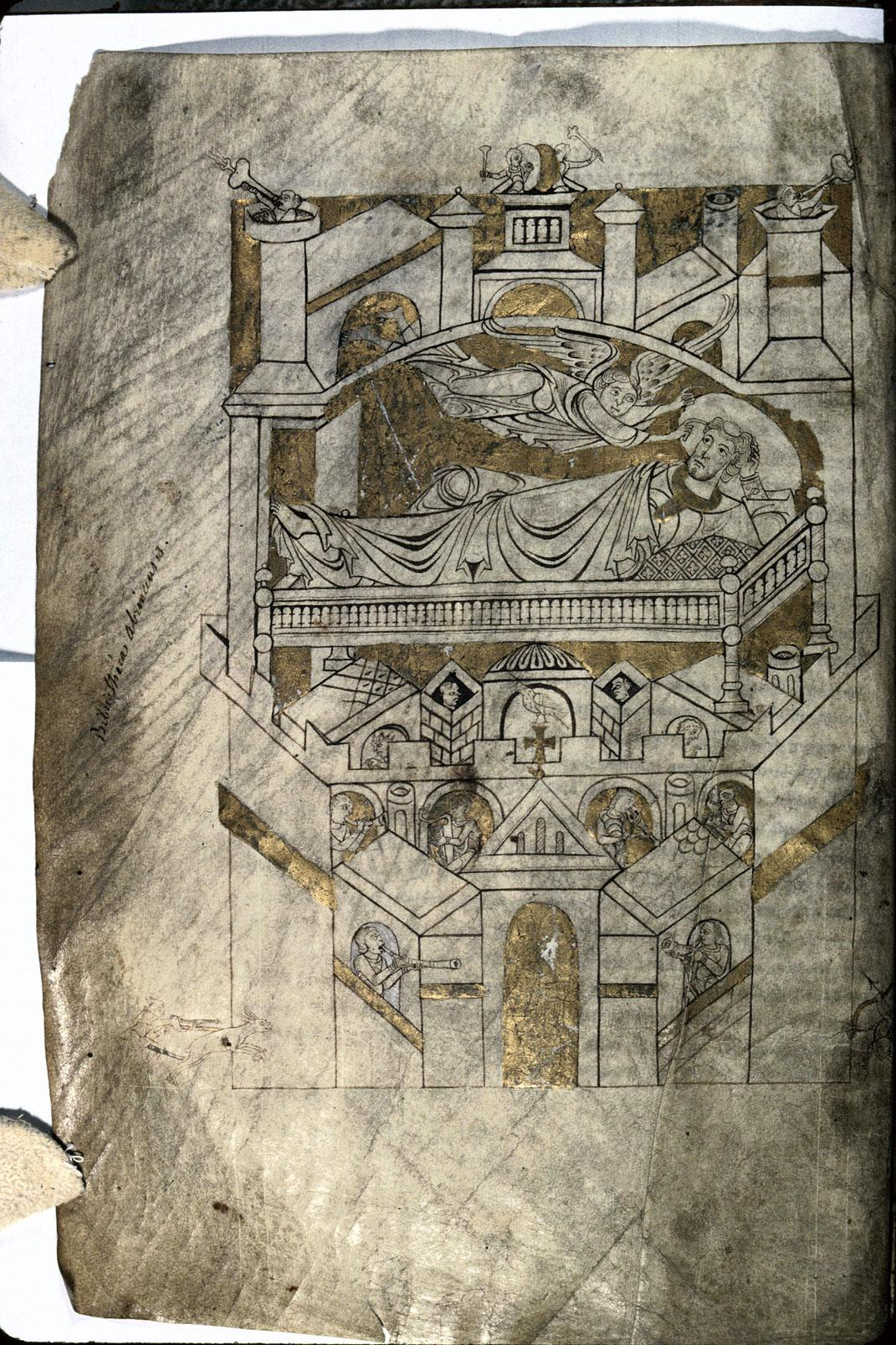
- The Vision of St. Aubert, f.4^{v}
- Type: Cartulary
- Date: Mid-12th century, with later additions up to the 14th century
- Place of origin: Mont-Saint-Michel Abbey
- Language: Latin
- Compiled by: Bernard the Venerable or Robert of Torigni
- Illuminated by: Anonymous
- Material: Parchment
- Size: 26 x 22.5 cm.
- Contents: Charters and historical documents relating to Mont-Saint-Michel Abbey

The Cartulary of Mont-Saint-Michel is a collection of illuminated manuscript charters from Mont-Saint-Michel Abbey in Normandy. It was begun in the mid-12th century in the abbey's scriptorium, but more documents were added up to the 14th century. It is currently kept in the ancient collection of the Bibliothèque Intercommunale, Avranches (MS. 210).

== History ==
The cartulary was intended to compile the temporal charters of Mont-Saint-Michel Abbey. Its precise date is debated by historians, with some arguing from the dates contained in the oldest charters that it was initiated by Bernard the Venerable, abbot until 1149, then continued under his successor Abbot Geoffroy. This corresponds to an eventful period for the abbey during which its privileges were contested by the Dukes of Normandy. The cartulary would have served to justify these privileges granted by the Pope, the King of France and the former dukes. For others, compilation began only under the abbacy of Robert of Torigni, in 1154. It seems that a first part is dated before 1154 and that additional parts were added in another writing between 1155 and 1159. Other elements, charters and other texts, were added in the 12th, 13th and 14th centuries.

When the abbey closed during the French Revolution, all the books kept there were transferred to Avranches, along with those from the other libraries of the abbeys in the district, while the archives were transferred to Saint-Lô. While the cartulary should have followed the archival documents, it was classified with the books and is therefore found in Avranches. It belonged first to the library of the central school of the city, then, after the suppression of the latter, this library became municipal. These are the last remaining charters of the Mont-Saint-Michel Abbey, those preserved in Saint-Lô having mostly been destroyed by fire during the bombardment of the city in 1944.

== Description ==
=== The text ===
This is a manuscript of 138 bound folios, containing:

- ff.3–4^{v}. A chronicle of the translation of the relics of Saint Magloire from Léhon Abbey to the Abbey of St. Magloire in Paris (Translatio sancti Maglorii). This is a later addition to the beginning of the cartulary, dated to the end of the 12th century.
- ff.5–10. A history of the apparition of Saint Michael to Saint Aubert (Revelatio), then a summary history of Normandy.
- ff.10–15. A history of the installation of the monks of the abbey, which evokes the arrival of the first Benedictines on Mont-Saint-Michel (Introductio monachorum). Followed by a false bull of Pope John XIII and a diploma of king Lothair.
- ff.17–112^{v}. The cartulary proper, with a difference in hand between the charters before 1154 (ff.17–108) and those dated after.
- ff.112^{v}–118. Various literary and historical texts from the 12th to the 14th centuries: an abridged chronicle of Mont-Saint-Michel from the abbacy of Robert de Torigny, various charters and documents dated up to 1337/1345, then some texts from the 14th century.

=== The decoration ===
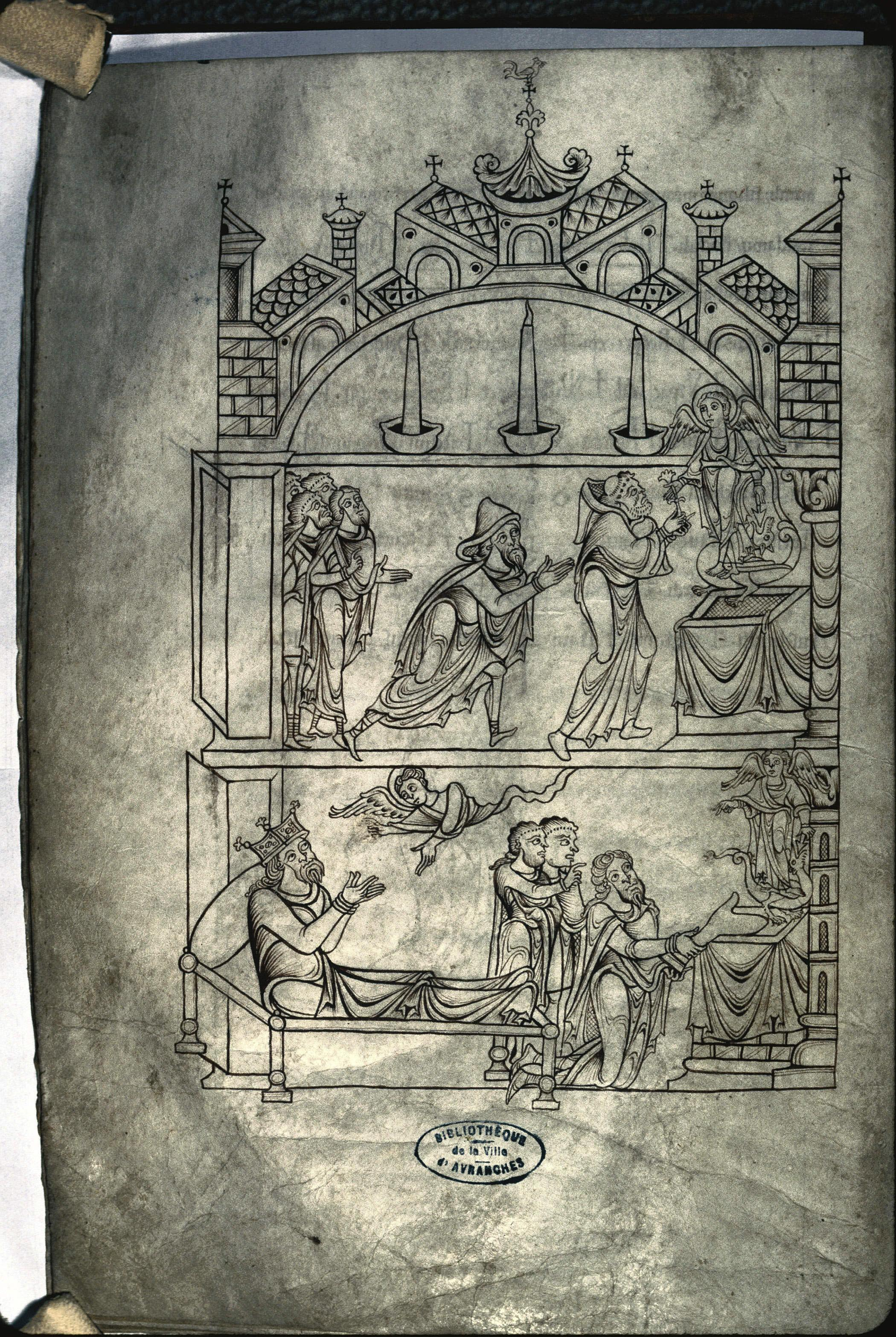
Edward the Confessor and Robert I, Duke of Normandy, f.25^{v}

The original cartulary of the manuscript, dated to the middle of the 12th century, is decorated with several ornate initials: they are placed at the beginning of each charter. The letters are very little varied, as it is most often an "I" or "L", but each letter has a different decoration. The initials of the oldest part are black in colour, and contain fantastic animals mixed with interlacing: unicorns, billy goats, owls and werewolves, inspired by Physiologus or by folklore. Other initials are blue or red. The manuscript also contains four miniatures covering all or most of their page:

- The apparition of Saint Michael to Saint Aubert (f.4^{v}): The legend behind the first religious foundation of Mont-Saint-Michel. The miniature, unlike the others, is embellished with gold.
- The privilege of Pope John XIII: it illustrates the pope's bull authorizing the Benedictines to settle on the Mount in 965, Abbot Maynard I receiving his document; then its confirmation by King Lothaire and by Duke Richard I of Normandy.
- The donation of Duchess Gunnor (f.23^{v}) In 1015, widow of Duke Richard, she is the donor of much land for the abbey. She is represented in the company of her son Robert the Dane, archbishop of Rouen and makes an act of donation to Abbot Hildebert I.
- The last large miniature (f.25v.) Represents Duke Robert of Normandy ceding his rights over the abbey of Mont-Saint-Michel to the archangel who immediately cedes them to the abbot, then, just below, perhaps Edward the Confessor making a donation to Saint Michael of St Michael's Mount in Cornwall by the symbol of the gift of a glove on an altar.

The style of these miniatures is not inspired by the Norman Romanesque illumination of this period, but is similar to that of illuminations made on the banks of the Loire or in the region of Le Mans, certain details being reminiscent of the stained glass windows of Le Mans Cathedral. It is possible that the illuminator who came to decorate the work in the scriptorium of the Mount came from this city. He may have been a layman.

== Editions ==
- Poulle, Emmanuel; Bouet, Pierre; Desbordes, Olivier (2005). Cartulaire du Mont Saint-Michel: fac-similé du manuscrit 210 de la Bibliothèque municipale d'Avranches. Le Mont-Saint-Michel: Les Amis du Mont-Saint-Michel. ISBN 2952490805.
- Keats-Rohan, K. S. B., ed. (2006). The Cartulary of the Abbey of Mont-Saint-Michel. Donington, Lincs.: Shaun Tyas. ISBN 9781900289696.
