= Tractat d'usura =

The Tractat d'Usura (Treaty about Usury) is a literary work written by Francesc Eiximenis in Catalan around 1374 possibly in Catalonia.

== Content ==
This book deals with usury, which is a matter that was very discussed by the medieval Canon law.

According to the index, it consisted in twenty-eight chapters, but only fourteen have been preserved. Moreover, there are five chapters of this work that are literally copied in the Terç del Crestià (Third Book of the Christian), in the part of this book that deals with the sin of avarice.

In the preserved part, Francesc Eiximenis has in general a restrictive point of view regarding usury. The starting point is Luke 6, 35, which says that if anything is lent, nothing else must be demanded in exchange. It has a relationship also with the general principle of Christian charity, which is so important in the Franciscan school, to which he belongs.

Nevertheless, he accepts some cases, where usury could be allowed. He accepts also the lawfulness of the censals and violaris, that would be the right to get an income for a certain period, or even for a lifetime after paying a certain amount of money. They were very common in Catalonia and the Crown of Aragon during the Middle Ages, and this matter was very discussed in medieval Canon law. The source that Eiximenis uses in order to justify the lawfulness of censals and violaris is a short treatise about this matter that was written by the Dominican Bernat de Puigcercós.

== Influences ==
This book is influenced by several Canon law sources.

Therefore, together with classical works of medieval Canon law such as the Gratian's Decree or the Decretals of Gregori IX, several important canonists can be pointed out: Henry of Segusio, saint Raymond of Penyafort or Geoffrey of Trani. The influence of other scholastical authors such as the Franciscans Alexander of Alessandria and Duns Scotus and even the Dominicans (although Eiximenis himself was a Franciscan) saint Thomas Aquinas and Durandus of Saint-Pourçain is also remarkable.

== Transcription and edition ==
It was transcribed and published by Josep Hernando i Delgado in 1985. The text that was used was taken from the manuscript nº 42 of the Monastery of Sant Cugat, that can be found in the General Archive of the Crown of Aragon.

== The Tractat d'usura inside Francesc Eiximenis' complete works on line ==
- Francesc Eiximenis' complete works (in Catalan and in Latin).
