= Liber instrumentorum memorialium =

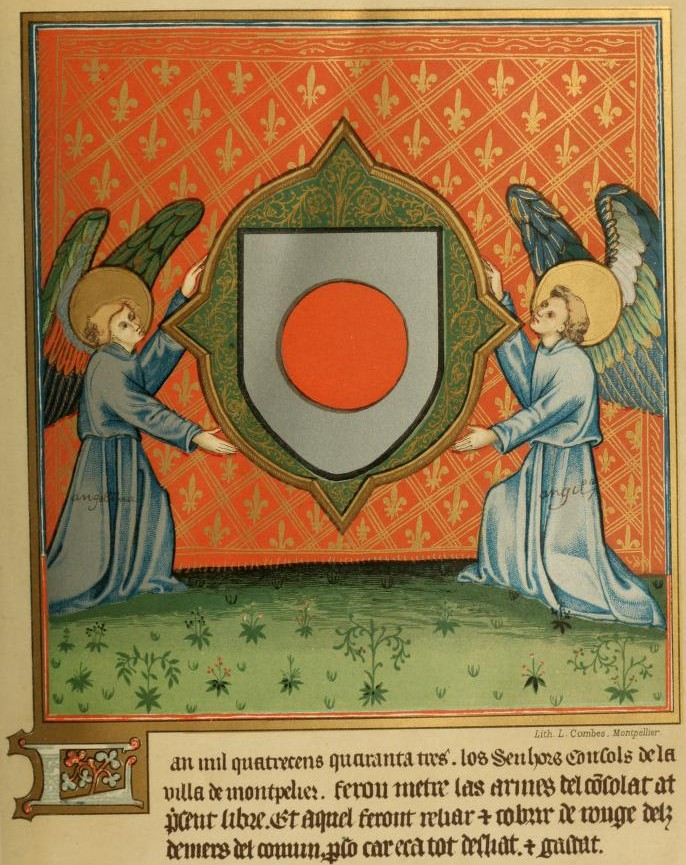
Page of Liber Instrumentorum memorialium

The Liber instrumentorum memorialium is the surviving cartulary of the Lords of Montpellier, the Guilhems (Guillems), and an important source for their history. It was compiled in the early thirteenth century, under the patronage of William VIII, whose lordship is extensively catalogued in it. Its earliest documents date to 1059; its latest to 1204. Its 570 instruments are organised by both type and geography. According to the cartulary's preface, the documents are of two main types: those dealing with the lord's possessions in the Diocese of Maguelonne (which includes papal privileges, privilegia) and those dealing with his possessions elsewhere. Of these 150 record oaths of various sorts, while only 30 are convenientia (conventions). The earliest documents record some agreements of William IV involving the castles of Pouget and Saint-Pons-de-Mauchiens in 1059. The last few documents record the brief independent rule of William VIII's daughter Mary before her marriage (15 June 1204) to Peter the Catholic brought the lordship into the Crown of Aragon.

On the exceptional completeness of the cartulary of the Guilhems, Archibald Ross Lewis wrote:

The Cartulary of the Guillems of Montpellier presents an unusually full record of the activities of a noble family of southern France between the last decades of the eleventh century and the earliest years of the thirteenth. Only the Cartulary of the Trencavels of Beziers, still unpublished, or the Liber feudorum of the Counts of Barcelona can be compared to it; and each of these is much less complete. The Cartulary is preserved primarily because after 1204 most of the heritage of the Guillems was taken over by the commune or town of Montpellier in a corporate sense. Since the town wished to exercise the rights that originally were those of its noble seigneurs, it was to the advantage of the townsmen to preserve intact the record of those rights and privileges which were contained in the Cartulary.

Some of the earliest provisions of the Coutumes de Montpellier, dating from 1190, can be found in the Liber. The Liber also gives evidence of the weakness of the King of France in the south of his realm during the twelfth century, when he figures only as a tool for dating documents; real authority lay with the Popes. The twelfth-century population of Montpellier has been estimated based on the Liber at 6,000–7,500 for the city and 9,000 when its rural environs are included.

== Editions ==
- Liber instrumentorum memorialium ou cartulaire des Guillems de Montpellier, 3 vols. A. Germaine and C. Chabanneau, edd. Montpellier: La Société Archéologique de Montpellier, 1884–86.
  - Third volume at GoogleBooks
