= Odile Favaron =

French mathematician

Odile Zink-Favaron (born May 3, 1938) is a French mathematician known for her research in graph theory, including work on well-covered graphs, factor-critical graphs, spectral graph theory, Hamiltonian decomposition, and dominating sets. She is retired from the Laboratory for Computer Science (LRI) at the University of Paris-Sud.

Favaron earned a doctorate at Paris-Sud University in 1986. Her dissertation, Stabilité, domination, irrédondance et autres paramètres de graphes [Independence, domination, irredundance, and other parameters of graphs], was supervised by Jean-Claude Bermond.

== Personal life ==
Her father was poet and professor Georges Zink. Michel Zink and Anne Zink are her siblings.
