= William V of Montpellier =

French noble and crusader (died 1121)

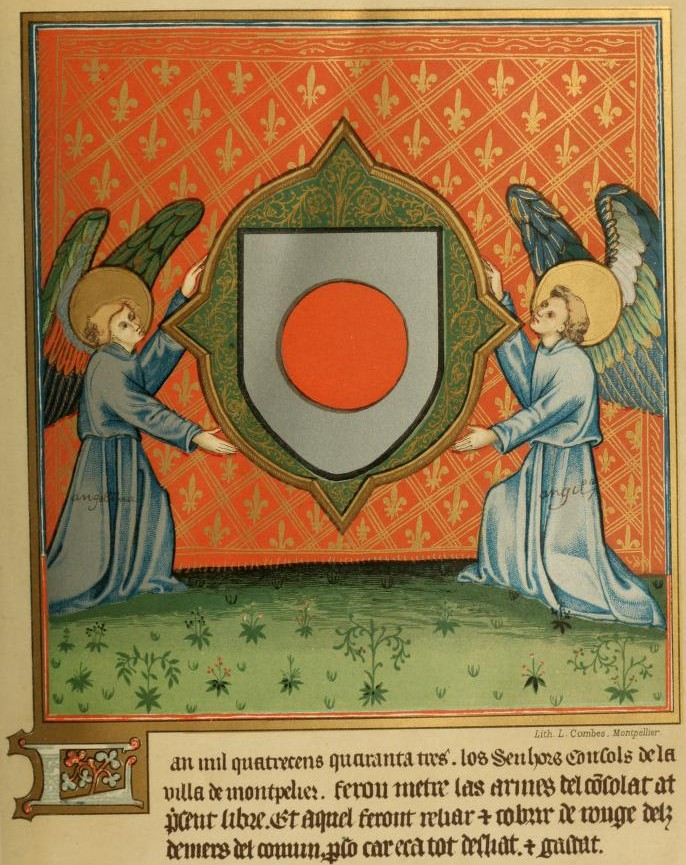
Coat of arms of the Montpellier family

William V (or Guilhem V; died 1121) was the Lord of Montpellier from 1068 until his death. He was the son of William IV.

== Biography ==
Soon after his father's death, his mother, Ermengarde, quit Montpellier to marry the Lord of Anduze. William IV had confided the tutelage of his son to the child's grandmother, Beliarde, and to his nearest relatives: William Arnold, Raymond Stephen, and William Aymoin. After a short conflict with the bishop of Maguelonne, William V rendered homage to the bishop on 10 December 1090 and was recognised as lord of Montpellier.

At the call of Pope Urban II, William took up the cross of the First Crusade in the army of Raymond IV of Toulouse. He served notably at the capture of the small Syrian village of Ma'arrat al-Numan in 1098. After the fall of Jerusalem in 1099, William remained in the Holy Land for a while. He remained at the side of Godfrey de Bouillon and accompanied him to the siege of Antioch in December 1097. He did not return to Montpellier until 1103, bringing with him a relic of Saint Cleopas.

When William returned, he found that the Aimoin brothers to whom he had confided the administration of the lordship in his absence had usurped many seigniorial rights and that he was obligated to recognise much of their newfound authority, which diminished his own, in order to retain his position.

William participated in the army of Raymond Berengar III of Barcelona which captured Mallorca from the Moors in 1114. The rest of his reign was marked by the important acquisition of nearby territories, which greatly recouped his power: Montarnaud, Cournonsec, Montferrier, Frontignan, Aumelas, Montbazin, Popian.

== Family ==
By his marriage to Ermensenda, daughter of Peter, Count of Mauguio, he had six children:

- William VI
- William of Aumelas
- Bernard, Lord of Villeneuve
- Guillelme
- Ermeniarde
- Adelaide

Upon his death, he was succeeded by his son William as Lord of Montpellier.

== Sources ==
- Riley-Smith, Jonathan (1998). The First Crusaders, 1095-1131. Cambridge University Press. pp. 158, 226, 266. ISBN 978-0-521-64603-1.
- Runciman, Steven, A History of the Crusades, Volume One: The First Crusade and the Foundation of the Kingdom of Jerusalem, Cambridge University Press, London, 1951, pp. 160, 259

== Notes ==
Titles of nobility
Preceded by William IV	Lord of Montpellier; 1090–1121	Succeeded by William VI
