= Monastery of Our Lady of Prouille =

Dominican monastery in Aude, France

Coordinates: 43.1878°N 2.0344°E

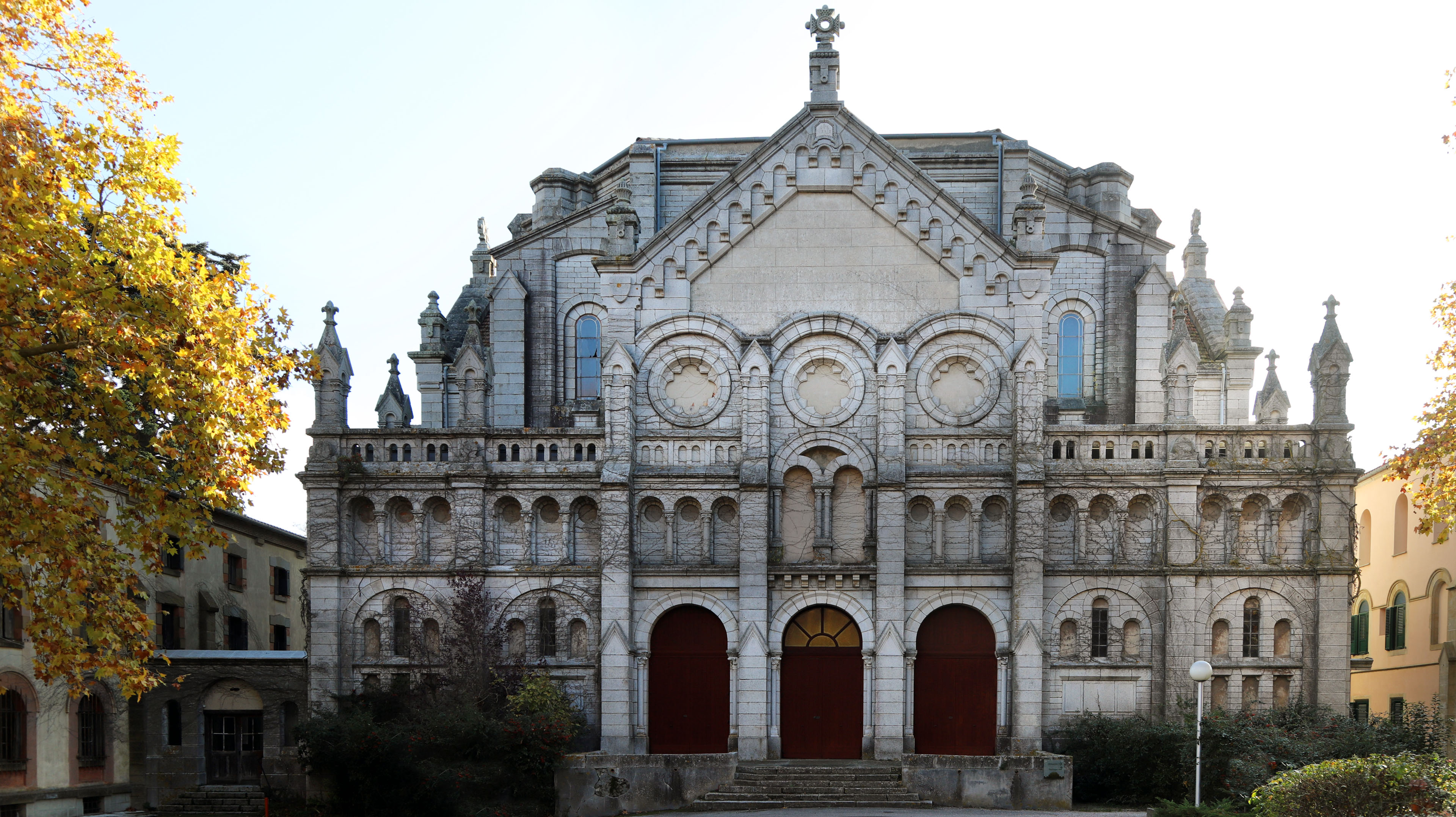
The Monastery of Prouille, France

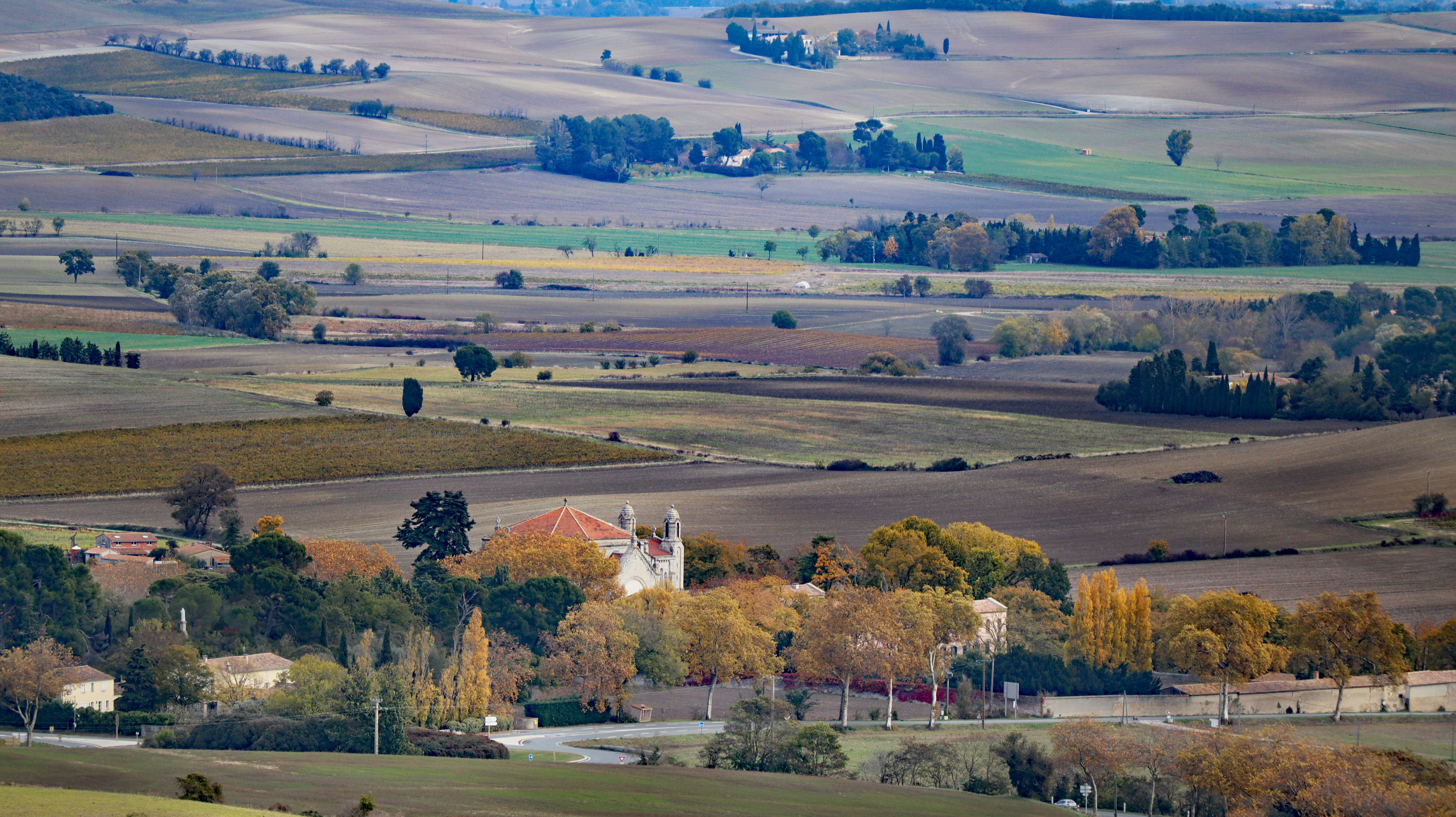
Panoramic view of the Monastery of Our Lady of Prouille

The Monastery of Our Lady of Prouille or Prouilhe (from Occitan: Prolha), is the "cradle of the Dominicans", where the first Dominican house, a monastery of nuns, was founded in late 1206 or early 1207. It is located in a hamlet in Languedoc, France, lying between Fanjeaux and Bram (now in the département of Aude), at the point where the road from Castelnaudary to Limoux crosses the road from Bram to Mirepoix.

In the early 13th century, Prouille was a decayed village, a fortified enclosure with a few buildings surrounding a crumbling church attached to the parish of Fanjeaux. Diego de Acebo, Bishop of Osma, and his canon, Dominic Gúzman, established themselves at Prouille, deep in Cathar country, in late 1206. Bishop Foulques of Toulouse allowed them to use the church, and, more important, Guillaume and Raymonde Claret of Prouille gave themselves and their cottage. On 17 April 1207 — the first certain date in the history of Notre-Dame-de-Prouille — Bérenger, the Bishop of Narbonne gave the new establishment the revenues of the Church of Saint-Martin at Limoux, though this gift was destined to be disputed by the Abbey of Saint-Hilaire. In 1211 Foulques gave the revenues of Prouille itself, part of his own income as bishop, to the house. The most generous donor was Simon de Montfort, 5th Earl of Leicester, leader of the Albigensian Crusade, and others followed his example.

The house thus established was intended partly as a refuge for women who had previously lived in Cathar religious houses but had formally converted to Catholicism, and partly the first established base of operations for Dominic and his followers. About twelve women, including Raymonde Claret, were the first nuns of Prouille, living under the Rule of St. Augustine: for several months some of them lodged at Fanjeaux, perhaps in the house of the first prioress of Prouille, Guillelmine de Fanjeaux, because the buildings at Prouille were scarcely habitable.

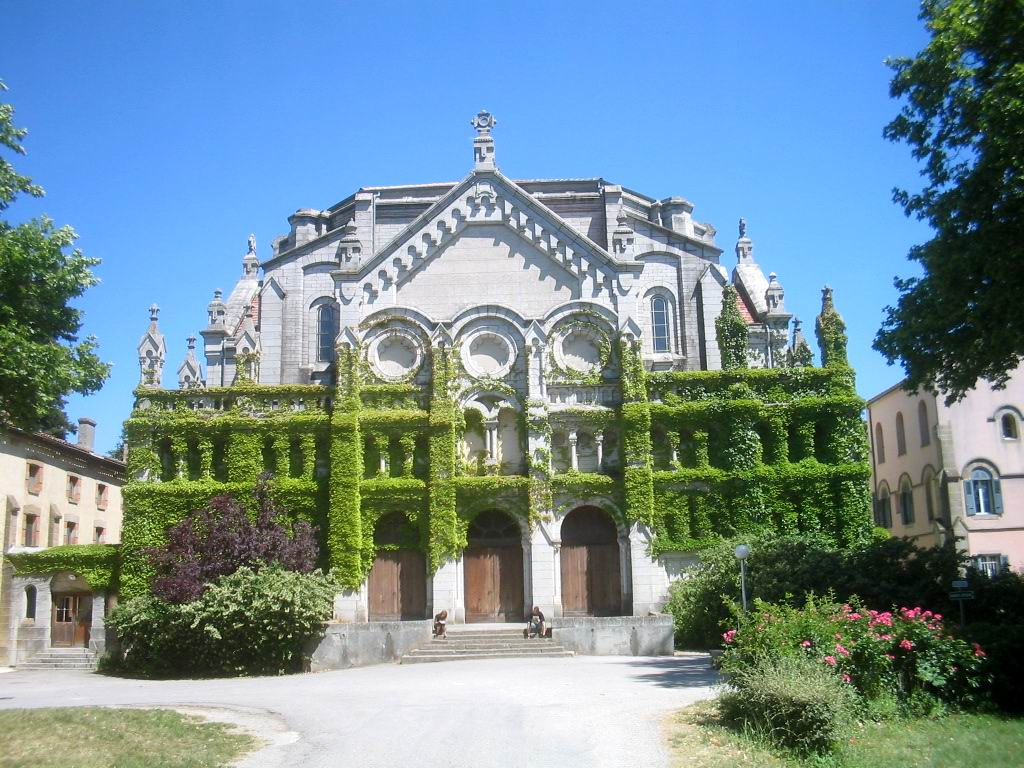
West end of the monastery church, rebuilt in the 19th century

The house was governed, however, by men, initially Dominic himself — the first procurator or prior — and Guillaume Claret. Dominic was succeeded as prior by Brother Noel and then by Guillaume Claret. Other men lived there too, because the second purpose of Prouille was to serve as a base for the itinerant preachers who conducted the work of conversion of the Cathars begun by Diego and Dominic. As such, the house is sometimes named Sacra Praedicatio, the "Sacred Preaching", in early documents. It has many other names, "church", "abbey", or (in a document of 1211) "the converted ladies living the religious life by the Church of Sainte-Marie of Prouille".

Dominic himself placed a special importance on the enclosure of women, yet it was not until 1294, many years after his death, that Prouille became a fully enclosed house. From that date onwards its nuns are described in documents as sorores inclusae, "enclosed sisters".

The monastery was so thoroughly razed during the French Revolution that only one arch keystone remains. Its triumphal rebuilding was a personal project of Henri-Dominique Lacordaire, who was the catalyst of the return of the banned Dominicans to France under the French Second Empire;

== Prouille and the origin of the Holy Rosary ==
Histories of the Holy Rosary often attribute its origin to Saint Dominic, inspired by a vision of the Blessed Virgin Mary at Prouille. Our Lady of the Rosary is the title received by the reported Marian apparition to Saint Dominic in 1208 in the Church of Prouille, in which the Virgin Mary gave the rosary to him.

== Bibliography ==
- Cartulaire de Notre-Dame de Prouille ed. Jean Guiraud. Paris: Picard, 1907.
- M.-H. Vicaire, Saint Dominic and his times; translated by Kathleen Pond. London: Darton, Longman and Todd, 1964.
- M.-H. Vicaire, "La naissance de Sainte-Marie de Prouille" in Pierre Mandonnet, Saint Dominique: l'idée, l'homme et l'oeuvre (Paris: Desclée De Brouwer, 1938) vol. 1 pp. 99–114.
