= William II of Montpellier =

French nobleman

William II (or in Occitan: Guilhem II) was the second Lord of Montpellier.

Titles of nobility
Preceded by William I of Montpellier	Lords of Montpellier; 1019–1025	Succeeded by William III of Montpellier
