= Raymond Geoffrey of Marseille =

12th Century Frank Noble

Raymond Geoffrey, Viscount of Marseille, usually called Barral of Marseille, was the third son of Hugh Geoffrey of Marseille and his wife Cécile of Aurons. Barral of Marseille was a patron of troubadours, including Folquet of Marseille and Peire Vidal.

Barral was first married to Alasacie Porcellet, daughter of Hugues Sacristan and Galberge Porcellet. They had one daughter, Barrale. He later repudiated Adelaide and married Marie of Montpellier in 1192 or shortly before, but died in the same year.

His daughter, Barrale, was married to Hugh III des Baux, son of Bertrand I des Baux and Tiburge of Orange (daughter of William of Aumelas). Their son was Barral des Baux.
