= Anne Zink =

French historian

Academic background
- Doctoral advisor: Pierre Goubert

Academic work
- Discipline: History

Anne Zink is a French historian and honorary professor of modern history. A student of Pierre Goubert, she specializes in the history of the Ancien Régime.

== Biography ==
She is the daughter of the poet Georges Zink and Marthe Cohn. Her brother is writer Michel Zink and her sister is mathematician Odile Favaron. Anne Zink was a student at the École normale supérieure de Sèvres, studying history and geography, receiving a third-cycle doctorate in 1965 and a State doctorate in 1985.

=== Career ===
She was an assistant professor at the Université de Paris X-Nanterre. She was named professor of modern history at the université Clermont-Ferrand-II.

Her works in social history are based on extensive archival research, reconstructing the lives of small communities. She has become one of the foremost experts on rural life in southwestern France under the Ancien Régime. Her research takes place at the École des Hautes études en sciences sociales (EHESS) in Paris. Her work is situated at the crossroads of history, geography, ethnology, and law. She has made several studies of the history of Sephardic Judaism in France, particularly in the southwest.

== Publications ==
- Azereix. La vie d'une communauté rurale à la fin du XVIIIe siècle, Paris : S.E.V.P.E.N., 1969.
- Pays et paysans gascons sous l'ancien régime, Lille 3 : ANRT, 1987.
- L'Héritier de la maison : Géographie coutumière du Sud-ouest de la France, Paris : Éditions de l'ÉHESS, 1993. ISBN 271320996X.
- Clochers et troupeaux : Les communautés rurales des Landes et du Sud-ouest de la France avant la Révolution, Talence : Presses universitaires de Bordeaux, 1997. ISBN 2867811813.
- Pays ou circonscriptions : Les collectivités territoriales de la France du Sud-Ouest, Paris : Publications de la Sorbonne, 2000. ISBN 2859443894.
- She has also published numerous articles which have been compiled in works such as:
  - Études réunies en l'honneur de Pierre Goubert, Toulouse, 1984
  - Mélanges en l'honneur de Robert Mandrou, Paris, 1985
