= Katharine Keats-Rohan =

British historian of the Middle Ages (born 1957)

Katharine Stephanie Benedicta Keats-Rohan (/ˈkiːts ˈroʊən, roʊˈhæn/; born 1957) is a British history researcher, specialising in prosopography. She has produced seminal work on early European history, and collaborated with, among others, Christian Settipani. Keats-Rohan is widely regarded as one of the founders of modern prosopographical and network analysis research, which has become highly computer-dependent.

== Works ==
- 1997: (Ed.) Family Trees and the Roots of Politics: the Prosopography of Britain and France from the Tenth to the Twelfth Century. Woodbridge, Suffolk: Boydell Press
- 1997: Domesday Names: an Index of Latin Personal and Place Names in Domesday Book; with David Thornton
- 1999: Domesday People: a Prosopography of Persons Occurring in English Documents, 1066–1166. I. Domesday Book Woodbridge, Suffolk: Boydell Press
- 1999: Prosopography of Post-Conquest England: the Continental Origin of English Landowners, 1066–1166
- 2000: Onomastique et Parenté dans l'Occident médiéval; with Christian Settipani
- 2002: Domesday Descendants: a Prosopography of Persons Occurring in English Documents, 1066–1166. II
- 2002: Resourcing Sources: Texts, Technology and Prosopography
- 2006: The Cartulary of the Abbey of Mont-Saint-Michel; with Shaun Tyas
- 2007: Prosopography Approaches and Applications: a Handbook (Prosopographica et Genealogica)
