= William I of Montpellier =

William I

Lord of Montpellier
- Tenure: 985–1025
- Successor: William II of Montpellier
- House: Guilhem
- Religion: Roman Catholicism

William I (or in Occitan: Guilhem I) was the founder of a dynasty which bears his name, the Guilhems, Lords of Montpellier. He received his fief (a manor) of Monspestularius (Montpellier) on 26 November 985 from Bernard, Count of Mauguio, with the permission of Ricuin, Bishop of Maguelone.

Without descendants after his death, his nephew Guilhem II of Montpellier succeeded him.

Titles of nobility
Preceded by (first)	Lords of Montpellier; 26 November 986 – 1019	Succeeded by William II of Montpellier
