= Michel Zink =

French writer, medievalist, philologist and professor (born 1945)

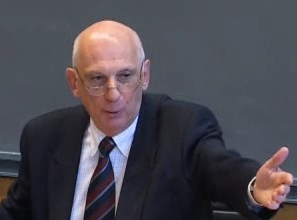
- Zink in 2009
- Born: 5 May 1945 (age 81); Issy-les-Moulineaux, France
- Known for: Member of the Académie française

Academic background
- Education: École normale supérieure
- Thesis: Recherches sur les pastourelles médiévales (1970)
- Doctoral advisor: Pierre le Gentil

Academic work
- Discipline: French medieval literature

Michel Zink (French pronunciation: [miʃɛl zɛ̃k]; born 5 May 1945) is a French writer, medievalist, philologist, and professor of French literature, particularly that of the Middle Ages. He is the Permanent Secretary of the Académie des Inscriptions et Belles-Lettres, a title he has held since 2011, and was elected to the Académie française in 2017. In addition to his academic work, he has also written historical crime novels, one of which continues the story of Arsène Lupin.

== Biography ==
Zink was born in Issy-les-Moulineaux near Paris to the poet Georges Zink and Marthe Cohn. Historian Anne Zink and mathematician Odile Favaron are his sisters. He graduated from the École normale supérieure in 1968, and completed his doctoral thesis, Recherches sur les pastourelles médiévales, in 1970 under the direction of Pierre le Gentil while working as an assistant professor at Paris-Sorbonne University. Working with Le Gentil, Zink completed a second thesis, La Prédication en langue romane avant 1300 in 1975, and the following year became a full professor at the University of Toulouse-Le Mirail. He returned to the Sorbonne in 1987 as a professor, then moved to the Collège de France in 1994, where he became the chair of Literatures of Medieval France. The chair position was created specifically for Zink after having been vacant for twenty years. Zink left the Collège de France in 2016.

He was elected to the Académie des Inscriptions et Belles-Lettres in 2000, filling the vacant seat of medievalist Félix Lecoy. He was named chair of the board of directors of the École normale supérieure in 2004, resigning his seat the following year in protest of Monique Canto-Sperber becoming the head of the institution. He received a Balzan Prize in 2007. In 2017, Zink was elected to seat 37 of the Académie française, filling the vacancy left by the death of historian René Girard.

== Honours and awards ==
=== Honours ===
- 2021 : Grand Officier of the Legion of Honour
- 2020 : Commander of the Ordre des Arts et des Lettres
- 2019 : Gold and Silver Star of the Order of the Rising Sun
- 2015 : Commander of the Order of Merit of the Italian Republic
- 2001 : Commander of the Ordre des Palmes académiques

=== Awards ===
- 2014 : Prix Provins-Moyen Âge
- 2007 : Balzan Prize
- 2001 : Medal of the Consistori del Gay Saber
- 1996 : Grand Gold Medal of the Arts-Sciences-Letters Society
- 1987 : Prize of the International Association for French Studies

=== Honorary degrees ===
- 2023 : Sofia University
- 2014 : University of Bucharest
- 2004 : University of Sheffield

== Works ==
=== Literary essays and critical editions ===
- La Pastourelle : poésie et folklore au Moyen Âge, Paris, Bordas, coll. Études, 1972, 160 p.
- La Prédication en langue romane avant 1300, Paris, Champion, coll. Nouvelle Bibliothèque du Moyen Âge, 1976, 580 p.; 2^{e} éd. revue, 1982.
- Belle : essai sur les chansons de toile, suivi d'une édition et d'une traduction, Paris, Champion, coll. Essais sur le Moyen Âge, 1978, 184 p.
- Roman rose et rose rouge : le Roman de la Rose ou de Guillaume de Dole de Jean Renart, Paris, Nizet, 1979, 127 p.
- Le Roman d’Apollonius de Tyr, édition, traduction et présentation, Paris, U.G.E. coll. 10/18. Série Bibliothèque médiévale No. 1483, 1982, 315 p.; puis nouvelle édition revue, Paris, LGF, coll. Le Livre de poche. Lettres gothiques No. 4570, 2006, 285 p.
- La Subjectivité littéraire autour du siècle de saint Louis, Paris, PUF, coll. Écriture, 1985, 267 p.
- Rutebeuf, Œuvres complètes, texte établi, traduit, annoté et présenté avec variantes, Paris, Garnier, coll. Classiques Garnier, 1989–1990, 2 vol., 514 p. et 535 p.; réédition dans une nouvelle édition revue et mise à jour, Paris, LGF, coll. Le Livre de poche. Lettres gothiques n° 4560, 2001, 1054 p.
- Le Moyen Âge : littérature française, coll. Phares, Presses Universitaires de Nancy, 1990, 167 p. réédition augmentée sous le titre Introduction à la littérature du Moyen-Âge, Paris, LGF, coll. Le Livre de poche. Références, 1993, 186 p. ISBN 978-2-253-06422-0
- Les Voix de la conscience : parole du poète et parole de Dieu dans la littérature médiévale, Caen, Paradigme, 1992, 418 p. [recueil d'articles].
- Littérature française au Moyen Âge, Paris, PUF, coll. Premier cycle, 1992, X-400 p.; 2e édition revue et mise à jour, 2001.
- Le Moyen Âge et ses chansons ou Un passé en trompe-l'œil, Paris, Éditions de Fallois, 1996, 231 p.
- Froissart et le temps, Paris, PUF, coll. Moyen Âge, 1998, 225 p.
- Le Jongleur de Notre-Dame : contes chrétiens du Moyen Âge, Paris, Le Seuil, 1999, 204 p.
- Déodat ou La transparence : un roman du Graal, Paris, Le Seuil, 2002, 153 p.
- Poésie et conversion au Moyen Âge, Paris, PUF, 2003, 346 p.
- Le Moyen Âge de Gaston Paris, Paris, Éditions Odile Jacob, 2004, 342 p.
- Le Moyen Âge à la lettre : abécédaire médiéval, Paris, Tallandier, 2004, 137 p.
- Livres anciens, lecture vivante, Paris, Éditions Odile Jacob, 2010, 352 p.
- D’autres langues que la mienne, Paris, Éditions Odile Jacob, 2014, 288 p.
- Bienvenue au Moyen Âge, Equateurs / France Inter, 2015, 184 p.
- L'Humiliation, le Moyen Âge et nous, Paris, Albin Michel, 2017, 261 p.

=== Novels ===
- Le Tiers d'amour : un roman des troubadours, Paris, Éditions de Fallois, 1998, 205 p.
- Arsène Lupin et le mystère d’Arsonval, Paris, Éditions de Fallois, 2004, 153 p.; réédition, Paris, LGF, coll. Le Livre de poche n° 35026, 2006 ISBN 2-253-11528-2
- Un portefeuille toulousain, Paris, Éditions de Fallois, 2007, 153 p.; réédition, Paris, LGF, coll. Le Livre de poche n° 31604, 2009 ISBN 978-2-253-12447-4
- Bérets noirs, bérets rouges, Paris, Éditions de Fallois, 2018, 220 p.

=== Memoir ===
- Seuls les enfants savent lire, Paris, Taillandier, 2009, 121 p. ISBN 978-2-84734-353-3. Réédition : Paris, Les Belles Lettres, 2019, 150 p. ISBN 978-2-251-44886-2.

=== Collaborations ===
- Commentary on Girart de Roussillon ou L'épopée de Bourgogne, with M. Thomas, adaptation into modern French of R.-H. Guerrand, Paris, Philippe Lebaud, 1990.
- Histoire européenne du roman médiéval : esquisse et perspectives, with M. Stanesco, Paris, PUF, coll. Écriture, 1992, 218 p.
- Revised edition of Dictionnaire des lettres françaises. Le Moyen Âge with Geneviève Hasenohr, Paris, LGF, coll. Le Livre de poche. La Pochothèque, 1992; repr. 1994 ISBN 2-213-59340-X, originally by Robert Bossuat, Louis Pichard and Guy Raynaud de Lage, Paris, 1939–64.
- L'Art d'aimer au Moyen Âge, with M. Cazenave, D. Poirion, and A. Strubel; Éditions du Félin, Ph. Lebaud, 1997, Un nouvel art d'aimer, p. 7-70.
- Pages manuscrites de la littérature médiévale, with Geneviève Hasenohr, Paris, LGF, coll. Le Livre de poche. Lettres gothiques, 1999, 95 p.
- L'Œuvre et son ombre : que peut la littérature secondaire ?, edited by Michel Zink, other contributions by Yves Bonnefoy, Pierre Bourdieu, Pascale Casanova, Antoine Compagnon, Michael Edwards, Marc Fumaroli, Michel Jarrety, Hubert Monteilhet, Carlo Ossola, Harald Weinrich, Paris, Éditions de Fallois, 2002, 154 p.
- Le Moyen Âge de Gaston Paris : la poésie à l'épreuve de la philologie, edited by Michel Zink, Paris, Éditions Odile Jacob, coll. Collège de France, 2004, 343 p.
- Naissance, Renaissances, Moyen Âge – XVI e siècle, with Frank Lestringant, Paris, PUF, 2006, 1063 p.
- Froissart dans sa forge, edited by Michel Zink, colloquium held in Paris, 4–6 November 2004, Paris, Académie des Inscriptions et Belles-Lettres – Collège de France, Éd. de Boccard, 2006, p. 5-6, 85-89 et 231–234.
- Moyen Âge et Renaissance au Collège de France, with Pierre Toubert, Paris, Fayard, 2009, 665 p.
