= Pierre Bouet =

French historian (born 1937)

- Born: 19 July 1937 (age 89); Caen, France
- Occupation: Historian
- Known for: Professor at the University of Caen Normandy

Pierre Bouet (born 19 July 1937 in Caen) is a 20th-century French historian specializing in Norman and Anglo-Norman historians of Latin language (tenth-twelfth centuries).

== Works ==
- Guillaume le Conquérant et les Normands au XI (in French). Charles Corlet. 2000. ISBN 978-2-84706-106-2.
- Hastings; 14 octobre 1066 (in French). Tallandier. 2010. ISBN 9782847346275.
- Rollon; Le chef viking qui fonda la Normandie. Biographies (in French). Paris: Tallandier. 2016. p. 320. ISBN 979-10-210-1746-7.

Works in collaboration:

- François Neveux (1995). Les évêques normands du XIe siècle; Colloque de Cerisy-la-Salle (30 September - 3 October 1993) (in French). Caen: Presses universitaires de Caen. p. 330. ISBN 2-84133-021-4.
- Véronique Gazeau (préf. David Bates) (2003). La Normandie et l'Angleterre au Moyen Âge; Colloque de Cerisy-la-Salle (4-7 October 2001) (in French). Caen: Publications du CRAHM. p. 364. ISBN 2-902685-14-9.
- Pierre Bouet; François Neveux (2002). Les Normands en Méditerranée : dans le sillage des Tancrède : actes du colloque de Cerisy-la-Salle (1992). Presses Universitaires de Caen. p. 288. ISBN 2841331563.
