= Geneviève Hasenohr =

French medievalist and philologist (born 1942)

Geneviève Hasenohr (born 3 July 1942) is a French philologist and prolific scholar of medieval and Renaissance French literature. She has authored or contributed to more than forty books, written at least fifty academic articles and reviews, and prepared numerous scholarly editions.

She contributed to two of the most widely used books in the field of medieval French literature. One is Introduction à l'ancien français, by Guy Raynaud de Lage, revised by Hasenohr. With Michel Zink, she revised volume 1 of the monumental Dictionnaire des lettres françaises, subtitled Le Moyen Age. Zink and Hasenohr also co-edited the international academic journal Romania.

Her earliest publications were under the name Geneviève Esnos, then from 1969 to 2002 much of her work appeared under the name Geneviève Hasenohr-Esnos.

Long a professor at the Sorbonne university in Paris and at the Section Romane of the Institut de Recherche et d'Histoire des Textes at the Centre National de Recherche Scientifique (CNRS) in Paris, she remains affiliated with the Ecole Pratique des Hautes Etudes and the Centre de recherche sur la création littéraire en France à la Renaissance.

She has been honored as a Knight of the National Order of Merit (France), and as a Chevalier des Palmes académiques. Since the year 2000, she has been a correspondent of the Académie des Inscriptions et Belles-Lettres.

Professor Hasenohr continues to publish careful studies of Latin and French manuscripts, with expertise in medieval philology, paleography, French literature, Christian spirituality, and women's writing.

== Selected bibliography ==
Selected bibliography of Geneviève Hasenohr
Year	Title / Work	Publication / Venue
1967	"Les traductions médiévales françaises et italiennes des Soliloques attribués à Saint-Augustin"	Rome: Ecole Française de Rome; Paris: De Boccard
1968	"Les anciennes traductions italiennes du De civitate dei"	Thesis
1969	"Le respit de la mort" par Jean Le Fèvre	Thesis (Paris: A. and J. Picard). Summary
1970	"Un recueil inédit de lettres de direction spirituelle du XVe siècle : le manuscrit Vat. lat. 11259 de la Bibliothèque Vaticane."	Mélanges d'archéologie et d'histoire 82.1, p. 401-500
1973	"Gace de La Bigne, maître chapelain de trois rois de France"	Mélanges Félix Lecoy, p. 181-192
1973	Paléographie du Moyen Âge (with Jacques Stiennon)	Paris: Armand Colin (also 1982, 1991)
1975	"Les traductions romanes du De Civitate Dei. I - La traduction italienne"	Revue d'histoire des textes 5, p. 169-238
1976	Lettres communes (Tome 3, fasc. 2, under dir. of Michel Hayez)	Rome: École française de Rome, p. 383-672
1978	"Un recueil de "distinctiones" bilingue du début du XIVe siècle: le manuscrit 99 de la Bibliothèque municipale de Charleville"	Romania 99, p. 47-96 and p. 183-206
1979	Tradition du texte et tradition de l'image: à propos d'un programme d'illustration du Theodolet	Ghent: E. Story-Scientia
1981	"A propos de la Vie de Nostre Benoit Saulveur Jhesus Crist"	Romania 102, p. 352-391
1981	Culture et travail intellectuel dans l'occident médiéval (co-edited with Jean Longère)	Paris: Centre national de la recherche scientifique
1982	"Méditation méthodique et mnemonique: un témoignage figuré ancien (XIIIe - XIVe siècles)"	Mélanges Jacques Stiennon, p. 365-382
1983	"Un manuscrit autographe de l'"Instruction de la vie mortelle" de Jean Baudouin de Rosiéres-aux-Salines"	Romania 104, p. 257-260
1984	Le Cur Deus homo d'Anselme de Canterbury et le De arrha animae de Hugues de Saint-Victor (co-edited)	Louvain-la-Neuve: Institut d'études médiévales de l'Université catholique de Louvain
1984	"La locution verbale figure dans l'oeuvre de Jean Le Fèvre"	Le Moyen français 14/15, p. 229-281
1984	"Note sur un lexique technique monolingue de la fin du XVe siècle"	Romania 105, p. 114-129
1984	Pierre Crapillet, recteur de l'Hôpital du Saint-Esprit de Dijon	Louvain-la-Neuve: Institut d'études médiévales de l'Université catholique de Louvain
1984	"La vie quotidienne de la femme vue par l'Église au bas Moyen Âge"	Medium Aevum Quotidianum 4, p. 17-20
1985	"Écrits moraux et lectures religieuses à la fin du Moyen âge: étude et édition de quelques textes en langue vernaculaire"	Thesis
1985	"Le sermon sur la passion de Jean Courtecuisse: étude de la tradition manuscrite et édition"	Le Moyen Français 16 (1985-1986), p. 7-114
1986	"Modèles de vie féminine dans la littérature morale et religieuse d'oc"	La femme dans la vie religieuse du Languedoc, p. 153-170
1986	"La vie quotidienne de la femme vue par l'Église: l'enseignement des "journées chrétiennes" de la fin du Moyen Age"	Frau und spätmittelalterlicher Alltag (Vienna: Österreichischen Akademie der Wissenschaften), p. 19-101
1987	"Aperçu sur la diffusion et la réception de la littérature de spiritualité en langue française au dernier siècle du Moyen Age"	Wissenorganisierende und wissensvermittelnde Literatur im Mittelalter (Wiesbaden: Reichert), p. 57-90
1988	"Le christianisme méridional au miroir de sa littérature (XIIIe-XIVe siècles)"	Heresis 11, p. 29-40
1988	"La littérature religieuse"	La littérature française aux XIVe et XVe siècles (Heidelberg: Carl Winter), p. 266-305
1989	"L'essor des bibliothèques privées aux XIVe et XVe siècles"	Histoire des Bibliothèques françaises 1, p. 215-263
1989	"Place et rôle des traductions dans la pastorale française du XVe siècle"	Traduction et traducteurs au Moyen Age (Paris: Editions du CNRS), p. 265-275
1989	"Le "Stabat mater dolorosa": poésie et spiritualité aux derniers siècles du moyen âge"	La Maison-Dieu 176, p. 81-115
1989	"Les traductions françaises du Stabat mater dolorosa"	Recherches Augustiniennes et patristiques 24, p. 241-355
1990	"Bibles et psautiers"	Mise en page et mise en texte du livre manuscrit, p. 316-327
1990	"Discours vernaculaire et autorités latines"	Mise en page et mise en texte du livre manuscrit, p. 289-315
1990	Introduction à l'ancien français (by Guy Raynaud de Lage, revised by G. Hasenohr)	Paris: SEDES (ISBN 2718116536 / ISBN 978-2718116532)
1990	"Les origines monastiques. Le rythme et la versification. Les chansons de geste. Les romans en vers"	Mise en page et mise en texte du livre manuscrit, p. 231-243
1990	"La prose"	Mise en page et mise en texte du livre manuscrit, p. 264-271
1990	"Les recueils lyriques. Les manuscrits théâtraux. Vers une nouvelle esthétique"	Mise en page et mise en texte du livre manuscrit, p. 329-352
1990	"Les systèmes de repérage textuel"	Mise en page et mise en texte du livre manuscrit, p. 272-287
1990	"Traductions et littérature en langue vulgaire"	Mise en page et mise en texte du livre manuscrit. VIII, p. 229-352
1991	"Aspects de la littérature de spiritualité en langue française, 1480-1520"	Revue de l'histoire de l'église en France 77, p. 29-45
1991	"Note sur une ancienne traduction lorraine (XIIe siècle ?) du Benjamin minor"	Revue d'histoire des textes 21, p. 237-242
1991	"Vie culturelle et vie spirituelle des hôpitaux bourguignons dans la seconde moitié du XVe siècle"	Les sources littéraires et leurs publics dans l'espace bourguignon 31.1, p. 93-100
1992	"Bible française"	Dictionnaire des lettres françaises. Le Moyen Âge, p. 179-196
1992	Dictionnaire des lettres françaises vol. 1, Le moyen âge (revised by Michel Zink and G. Hasenohr)	Paris: Le Livre de Poche / Fayard (also 1994 ed.)
1993	"De l'écriture à la lecture: réflexion sur les manuscrits d'Erec et Enide"	Les Manuscrits de Chrétien de Troyes, Pt. 1, p. 97-148
1993	"Le Credo apostolique dans la littérature française du Moyen Âge"	Pensée, image et communication en Europe médiévale, p. 175-178
1995	"Copistes italiens du Lancelot: le manuscrit fr. 354 de la Bibl. Nationale"	Lancelot, Lanzelet. Hier et aujourdhui, p. 219-226
1995	Études de lexicologie et dialectologie (co-edited with Jacqueline Picoche and Nelly Andrieux-Reix)	Paris: Conseil international de la langue française
1995	"Un nouveau témoignage de la concurrence entre futur II et subjonctif imparfait en moyen français"	Mélanges Jacques Chaurand, p. 43-48
1995	"Représentations et lectures de la Nativité à l'aube de la Renaissance"	Marguerite de Navarre 1492-1992. Actes du colloque international de Pau, p. 365-401
1996	"Le dit de l'arbre"	Ensi firent li ancessor : mélanges de philologie médiévale offerts à Marc-René Jung, p. 559-572
1996	"Du bon usage de la galette des rois"	Romania 114, p. 445-467
1996	"Religious Reading Amongst the Laity in France in the Fifteenth Century"	Heresy and Literacy, 1000-1530 ( Cambridge University Press), p. 205-221
1997	"Un exemple d'accommodation linguistique au début du XVIe siècle"	Les formes du sens : études de linguistique française... offertes à Robert Martin, p. 167-174
1997	"Note sur un fragment de la Naissance du chevalier au cygne (Beatrix)"	Romania 115, p. 250-258
1998	"Abréviations et frontières de mots"	Langue Française 119, p. 24-29
1998	"En Auvergne au XVe siècle: le chanoine Roger Benoiton et ses livres"	Mélanges André Vernet, p. 421-466
1998	"La prédication aux fidéles dans la première moitié du XIIe siècle: l'enseignement des sermons 'limousins'"	Romania 116, p. 34-71
1999	"Les recueils littéraires français du XIIIe siècle: public et finalité"	Codices Miscellanearum (Brussels), p. 37-50
1999	Pages manuscrites de la littérature médiévale (with Michel Zink)	Paris: Librairie Générale Française / Le Livre de Poche
1999	"La tradition du Miroir des simples âmes au XVe siècle: de Marguerite Porète († 1310) à Marguerite de Navarre"	Comptes rendus des séances de l'Académie des Inscriptions et Belles-Lettres 4, p. 1347-1366
2000	"Un Donat de dévotion en langue d'oc du XIIIe siècle: le Liber divini amoris"	Eglise et culture en France méridionale, p. 219-243
2000	"Les prologues des textes de dévotion en langue française (XIIIe-XVe siècles): formes et fonctions"	Les prologues médiévaux, p. 593-638
2001	Les langues du sud: entre érosion et emergence (ed. Geneviève Hasenohr-Esnos)	Paris: Comité des travaux historiques et scientifiques, 2004 (ISBN 9782735505425)
2002	Œuvres complètes de Marguerite de Navarre, vol. 4, Théâtre (co-edited)	Paris: Honoré Champion
2002	"Écrire en latin, ecrire en roman: réflexions sur la pratique des abréviations dans les manuscrits francais des XIIe et XIIIe siècles"	Langages et peuples d'Europe, p. 79-110
2002	"Quelques opuscules spirituels du XIIIe siècle en langue d'oc (ms. Egerton 945)"	Mélanges Nicole Cazauran, p. 493-509
2002	"Typologie spirituelle et morphologie lexicale. Remarques sur le vocabulaire français de la solitude (XIIe-XVe siècles)"	Cultura neolatina 62.3-4, p. 229-245
2003	"Une exposition 'humaniste' du Pater en langue d'oïl du XIIIe siècle"	Religion et mentalités au Moyen Âge (Presses Universitaires de Rennes), p. 271-281
2004	"Variation régionale, réception des textes et localisation des témoins quelques remarques à propos d'un manuscrit occitan du premier quart du XIVe siècle"	Les langues du Sud, p. 43-50
2005	"Dire la verité", "oir la verité": quelle vérité ? À propos de quelques occurrences de vérité relevées dans les sermons de Gerson"	La transmission des savoirs au Moyen Âge et à la Renaissance 1, p. 13-28
2005	"Une Passion provençale inédite du XIVe siècle"	Mélanges Jean Duvernoy, p. 207-231
2006	"D’une « poésie de béguine » à une « poétique des béguines ». Aperçus sur la forme et la reception des textes (France, XIIIe-XIVe s.)"	Comptes rendus des séances de l'Académie des Inscriptions et Belles Lettres 150, p. 913-943
2006	"Un enseignement de vie chrétienne du XIII siècle et sa postérité: la 'Regle des coeurs ordonnés'"	Romania 124.3, p. 324-360
2007	"Deux chansons franciscaines françaises du XIIIe siècle"	Revista portuguesa de história do livro 10, p. 35-69
2009	"Un faux Pierre de Luxembourg, un vrai Arnoul de Bohéries un Isidore travesti dans la bibliothèque de Marguerite d'York"	Miscellanea in memoriam Pierre Cockshaw (1938-2008), p. 175-193
2009	"'Lacrimae pondera vocis habent': Typologie des larmes dans la littérature de spiritualité française des XIIIe-XVe siècles"	Le Moyen Français 37.1, p. 45-63
2009	"Réflexions sur la genèse du Livre des oraisons"	Froissart à la cour de Béarn (Turnhout: Brepols), p. 223-247 (ISBN 978-2-503-52867-0)
2010	"Isidore de Séville, auteur ascétique 'français'?"	Romania vol. 128 (2010) p. 299-351 and vol. 129 (2011) p. 23-56
2014	"Retour sur les caractères linguistiques du manuscrit de Chantilly et de ses ancêtres"	Marguerite Porete et le “Miroir des simples âmes” (Paris: Vrin), p. 103-126 (ISBN 9782711625246)
2014	"La seconde vie du Miroir des simples âmes en France : Le Livre de la discipline d’amour (XVe-XVIIIe s.)"	Marguerite Porete et le “Miroir des simples âmes” (Paris: Vrin), p. 263-317 (ISBN 9782711625246)
n.d.	"Note sur une traduction française de la Règle de Saint Benoît à Saint-Germain-des-Prés (14.-16. siècles)"	Le livre et l'historien: études offertes en l'honneur du professeur Henri-Jean Martin, p. 25-39
n.d.	"Si 'de picart en franczoys': de l'ancien au moyen français"	Source & date unknown, p. 145-152
