= Maria of Montpellier =

Queen of Aragon from 1204 to 1213

Marie
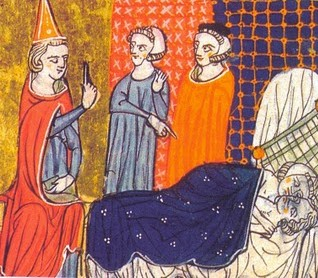
- The consummation of Marie and Peter II's marriage.

Lady of Montpellier
- Reign: 15 June 1204 – 21 April 1213
- Predecessor: William IX
- Successor: James I
- Co-ruler: Peter

Queen consort of Aragon
- Tenure: 15 June 1204 – 21 April 1213
- Born: 1182
- Died: 21 April 1213 (aged 30–31); Rome
- Spouses: Barral of Marseille (m. 1192; died 1192) Bernard IV of Comminges (m. 1197; div. 1201) Peter II of Aragon (m. 1204)
- Issue: Matilda, Viscountess de la Barthe; Petronila, Countess of Astarac; Infanta Sancha; James I
- House: Guilhem
- Father: William VIII of Montpellier
- Mother: Eudokia Komnene

Marie of Montpellier (adapted from Occitan: Maria de Montpelhièr) (1182 – 21 April 1213) was Lady of Montpellier and by her three marriages Viscountess of Marseille, Countess of Comminges and Queen of Aragon.

She was the daughter of William VIII, Lord of Montpellier, and Eudokia Komnene, a niece of Byzantine Emperor Manuel I Komnenos.

== Life ==
Since her birth, Marie was the legitimate heiress of the Lordship of Montpellier, because a clause of the marriage contract of her parents established that the firstborn child, boy or girl, would succeed in Montpellier on William VIII's death.

In April 1187, William VIII repudiated Eudokia Komnene and married a certain Agnes, a relative of the Kings of Aragon. They had eight children, six sons and two daughters. Although Eudokia entered in a convent in Aniane as a Benedictine nun, William VIII's second marriage was declared invalid and all the children born from this union declared illegitimate, so Marie remained as the undisputed heiress of Montpellier.

Marie married Viscount Raymond Geoffrey II of Marseille, also named Barral, in 1192 or shortly before, but was widowed at the end of that year. Her second marriage, in December 1197, was to Count Bernard IV of Comminges, and at the insistence of her father, Marie renounced her rights over Montpellier in favor of her eldest half-brother William (IX), son of Agnes.

From her marriage with Bernard IV, Marie had two daughters, Mathilde (by marriage viscountess of la Barthe) and Petronille (by marriage countess of Astarac). The marriage was, however, notoriously polygamous (Bernard IV had two other living wives) and was finally annulled (some say on Marie's insistence, some say on that of King Peter II of Aragon) in 1201. Marie was once more heir to Montpellier with this annulment, but her father never recognized her and openly acknowledged his son William IX as his heir.

William VIII died in 1202. Marie's half-brother William IX had taken control of the city, but she asserted her right to it. On 15 June 1204 Marie married Peter II of Aragon, and thanks to a revolt against William IX, she was recognized as Lady of Montpellier.

From her marriage with Peter II, Marie gave birth to two children: Sancha (born in 1205, died aged one) and James (born on 1 February 1208). Peter II attempted to divorce her, hoping both to marry Maria of Montferrat, queen of Jerusalem, and to claim Montpellier for himself. Marie's last years were spent in combating these political and matrimonial maneuvers. Pope Innocent III finally decided in her favor, refusing to permit the divorce. Marie died in Rome (21 April 1213) on her way back to Aragon, and Peter II a few months later (14 September 1213) at the Battle of Muret. Marie and Peter II's only surviving child, James, inherited Aragon and Montpellier.

== Sources ==
- Graham-Leigh, Elaine (2005). The Southern French Nobility and the Albigensian Crusade Hardcover. The Boydell Press.
- Guillaume de Puylaurens, Chronique 1145-1275 ed. and tr. Jean Duvernoy (Paris: CNRS, 1976) pp. 62–3.

== Bibliography ==
- J. M. Lacarra, L. Gonzalez Anton, 'Les testaments de la reine Marie de Montpellier' in Annales du Midi vol. 90 (1978) pp. 105–120.
- Nique, Christian (2013), Les deux visages de Marie de Montpellier (1182-1213) (PDF) (in French), Montpellier: Académie des Sciences et Lettres de Montpellier
- M. Switten, 'Marie de Montpellier: la femme et le pouvoir en Occitanie au douzième siècle' in Actes du Premier Congrès International de l'Association d'Etudes Occitanes ed. P. T. Ricketts (London: Westfield College, 1987) pp. 485–491.
- Varzos, Konstantinos (1984). Η Γενεαλογία των Κομνηνών [The Genealogy of the Komnenoi] (PDF) (in Greek). Vol. B. Thessaloniki: Centre for Byzantine Studies, University of Thessaloniki. pp. 346–359.

Maria of Montpellier Guilhem dynasty Born: circa 1182 Died: 18 April 1213
French nobility
Preceded by William IX	Lady of Montpellier; 1204–1213	Succeeded by James I
Royal titles
Preceded by Sancha of Castile	Queen consort of Aragon; 1204–1213	Succeeded by Eleanor of Castile
