= Liber feudorum Ceritaniae =

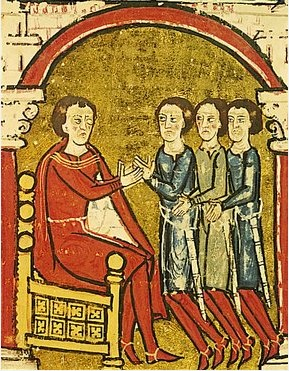

The Liber feudorum Ceritaniae is, as its Latin title indicates, a book (liber, in fact a chartulary) registering the fiefs (feudi) within the counties of Cerdagne (Ceritania), Roussillon and Conflent, and the feudal obligations of the count and his vassals. It is preserved in the Arxiu de la Corona d'Aragó (Cancelleria Reial, reg. no. 4) and consists of 272 charters in 379 folios with 32 colourful miniatures on a golden background. It was probably originally copied from a part of the Liber feudorum maior (LFM), which is several decades older. It contains all the documents pertaining to Cerdagne and Roussillon found in the LFM and in exactly the same order, as well as six documents more. Most of the charters in it cover the years 1172–6.

The text of the Liber probably dates to between 1200 and 1209, though Lawrence McCrank has dated it later, to 1237–41. In the latter year Peter II of Aragon, who held the counties of Cerdagne and Roussillon, bestowed them on his uncle Sancho, who had been dispossess of them in 1185 by his brother, Peter's father, Alfonso II, who was king during the period when most of the charters were made. The oldest charter in the collection dates from the reign of Lothair I. It may represent the first and only completed part of a larger project of regional libri feudorum made to accompany the LFM, which itself was left uncompleted.

== Illustrations ==
The 32 miniatures are, with the exception of the one on the first folio, from the hand of a single artist. There is one for each document in the chartulary and they are consistent in size, with a maximum height of 11.5 cm and maximum width of 9.5 cm. They are all alike in content, depicting the count either receiving his vassals' hands in his own or negotiating with them from his throne. The scene is always set in an interior marked by large arches and columns. Despite this, the miniatures have not been the object of any serious artistic or iconographic study.

The first folio, by a different artist from the rest, depicts Isarn and Dalmau, lords of Castellfollit, rendering homage to Wifred II of Cerdagne. It is of a higher calibre than the other miniatures and is painted in the Byzantinist style that was becoming dominant in Catalonia around 1200. This artist has been identified with the painter of the altar fronts at Sant Sadurní de Rotgers and Aviá. He also illustrated a manuscript of Augustine of Hippo's De civitate Dei. It is more artistic than the Liber, but the Byzantine influence is still acutely felt.

The lesser artist of the remaining 31 miniatures was probably a native Catalan accustomed to painting altars. He appears influenced by contemporary enamel production, especially of the south French school centred on Limoges and active in the late twelfth and early thirteenth centuries. Twelve of the miniatures are unfinished and reveal that the colour and the golden background was added on top of a prior drawing. Though his miniatures are not artistically noteworthy, they are a rich documentary record of the major Catalan figures of the era:

- Folio 6v. depicts a convention between Folch, Bishop of Urgell, and count William I of Cerdagne concerning the castle of Cardona, of which Folch was lord.
- Folio 9v. depicts Saint Ermengol, Bishop of Urgell, swearing an oath of fealty to Wifred II.
- Folio 71 depicts the betrothal of the Gausfred III of Roussillon to the Ermengarda, daughter of the Trencavel viscount Bernard Ato IV and his wife Cecilia. Such depictions were rare in medieval manuscripts.
- Folio 73 depicts Alfonso, King of Aragon, receiving the homage of the men of the deceased count of Roussillon, Guinard II.
