= Eudokia Komnene, Lady of Montpellier =

Spouse of William VIII of Montpellier

Eudokia Komnene
- Lady of Montpellier
- Born: c. 1160
- Died: c. 1203
- Noble family: Komnenos
- Spouse: William VIII of Montpellier
- Issue: Maria of Montpellier

Eudokia Komnene (or Eudocia Comnena) (Greek: Εὐδοκία Κομνηνή, Eudokia Komnēnē) (c. 1160 – c. 1203) was a relative of Byzantine Emperor Manuel I Komnenos, and wife of William VIII of Montpellier.

== Life ==
Eudokia Komnene's parentage has been subject to scholarly dispute. She is not mentioned in any contemporary Byzantine source, while western sources describe her ambiguously as kinswoman of Manuel I Komnenos (r. 1143–1180). As such, her precise placement within the Komnenoi remains uncertain, with recent scholars suggesting that she was daughter of Manuel's brother, the sebastokrator Isaac Komnenos, son of the Byzantine emperor John II Komnenos (r. 1118–1143), or of his nephew, protostrator Alexios Komnenos, son of sebastokrator Andronikos Komnenos, likewise son of Emperor John.

Eudokia Komnene was sent to Provence by Manuel in 1174 to be betrothed to a son of the royal family of Aragon-Barcelona. According to untrustworthy troubadour narrative, her projected husband was to be their eldest son, King Alfonso II of Aragon (who had just married Sancha of Castile). The Annals of the city of Pisa report that the intended bridegroom was to be Alfonso's younger brother, Ramon Berenguer III, Count of Provence. The projected marriage aimed at thwarting the influence of Emperor Frederick I through an Aragonese and Provençal alliance with Emperor Manuel I of Constantinople. However the betrothal was terminated by Emperor Frederick I as the liege lord of the County of Provence, the emperor proposing William of Montpellier as a suitable alternative to become her husband. The betrothal with Raymond Berenger was at end in 1179 at latest. Count Raymond died in 1181, incidentally in Montpellier.

As the troubadour Peire Vidal put it, the young king had preferred a poor Castilian maid to the emperor Manuel's golden camel.

After much indecision Eudokia married William VIII of Montpellier in 1180, having made it a condition (to which all male citizens of Montpellier were required to swear) that their firstborn child, boy or girl, would succeed him in the lordship of Montpellier.

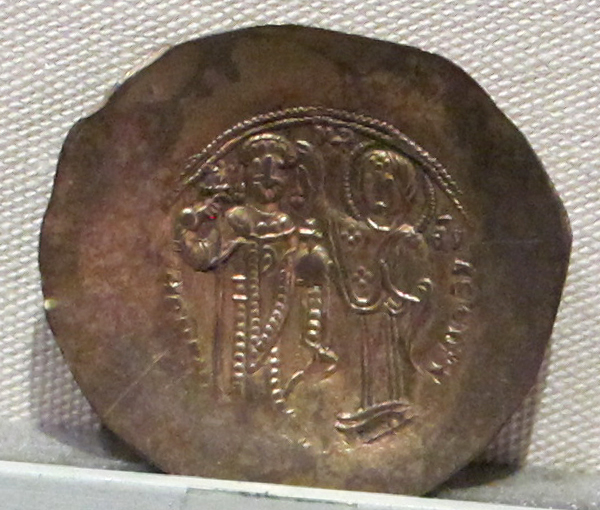
Coin of Manuel I, who sent Eudokia to the west.

Eudokia was sometimes described by contemporaries, including the troubadours Folquet de Marselha and Guiraut de Bornelh, as an empress (Occitan: emperairitz) and was commonly said to be a daughter of the Emperor Manuel, which has led to some confusion among modern authors about her family links. Other sources, such as Guillaume de Puylaurens, identify her simply as Manuel's kinswoman.

William VIII and Eudokia had one daughter, Maria of Montpellier, born in 1182. In April 1187 her husband divorced her (because she encouraged the advances of Folquet de Marselha, according to the Biographies des Troubadours; because William VIII wanted a male heir, according to documents likely to be more reliable). Eudokia was thereafter held at the monastery of Aniane and took the veil as a Benedictine nun. She died about 1203, shortly before her daughter's marriage to King Peter II of Aragon.

== Sources ==
- Annali Pisani. Continuazione volgara, 1179, pp 67..68
- Boutière, J. and A.-H. Schutz, eds., Biographies des troubadours (Paris: Nizet, 1964) pp. 476–481.
- Duvernoy, Jean (1976), Guillaume de Puylaurens, Chronique 1145-1275: Chronica magistri Guillelmi de Podio Laurentii, Paris: CNRS, ISBN 2-910352-06-4, pp. 62–63.
- Graham-Leigh, Elaine (2005). The Southern French Nobility and the Albigensian Crusade Hardcover. The Boydell Press.
- Hecht, Winfried (1968). "Zur Geschichte der "Kaiserin" von Montpellier, Eudoxia Komnena". Revue des études byzantines (in German). 26: 161–169. doi:10.3406/rebyz.1968.1403.
- Sharman, Ruth V.. The Cansos and Sirventes of the Troubadour Giraut de Borneil. Cambridge: Cambridge University Press, 1989. ISBN 0-521-25635-6, p. 59.
- Stiernon, Lucien (1965). "Notes de titulature et de prosopographie byzantines: Sébaste et gambros". Revue des études byzantines (in French). 23: 222–243. doi:10.3406/rebyz.1965.1349.
- Stronski, Stanislaw, Le troubadour Folquet de Marseille (Kraków: Académie des Sciences, 1910) pp. 156–158.
- Sturdza, M. D. (1999). Dictionnaire Historique et Généalogique des Grandes Familles de Grèce, d'Albanie et de Constantinople, 2nd ed. Paris.
- Varzos, Konstantinos (1984). Η Γενεαλογία των Κομνηνών [The Genealogy of the Komnenoi] (PDF) (in Greek). Vol. B. Thessaloniki: Centre for Byzantine Studies, University of Thessaloniki.
