= General Archive of the Crown of Aragon =

Coordinates: 41°23′43.68″N 2°11′15.01″E

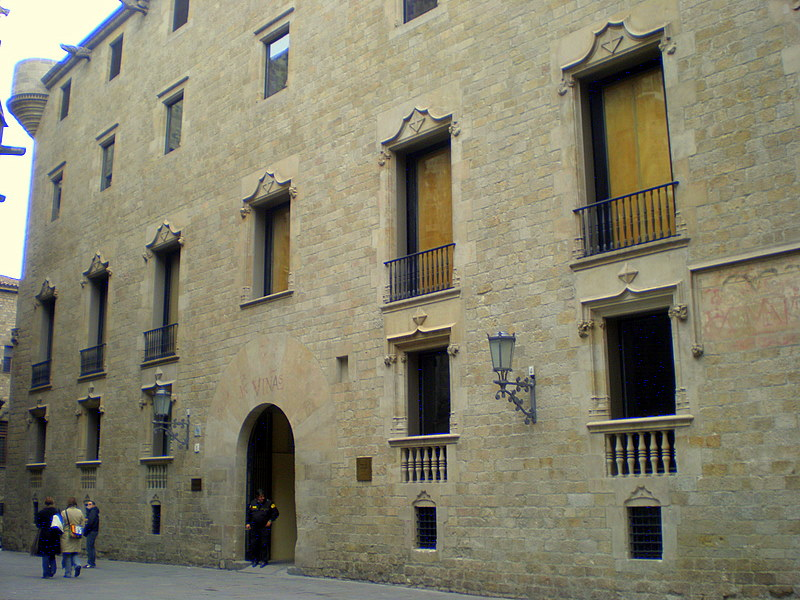
General Archive of the Crown of Aragon building until 1993.

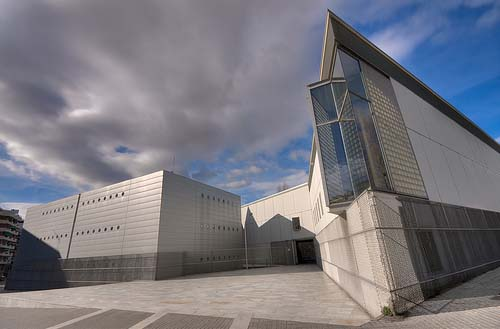
General Archive of the Crown of Aragon building since 1993

The General Archive of the Crown of Aragon (Catalan: Arxiu General de la Corona d'Aragó), originally Royal Archives of Barcelona (Catalan: Arxiu Reial de Barcelona), is an archive containing the background documents of the institutions of the former Crown of Aragon and currently also contains other historical resources.

The archive was originally based in the sixteenth century Palau del Lloctinent (Lieutenant Palace) in Barcelona. While the Palau remains open as a teaching and exhibition space, since 1994 the archive's headquarters have moved to a new building on Carrer dels Almogàvers.

== History ==
=== Precedents ===
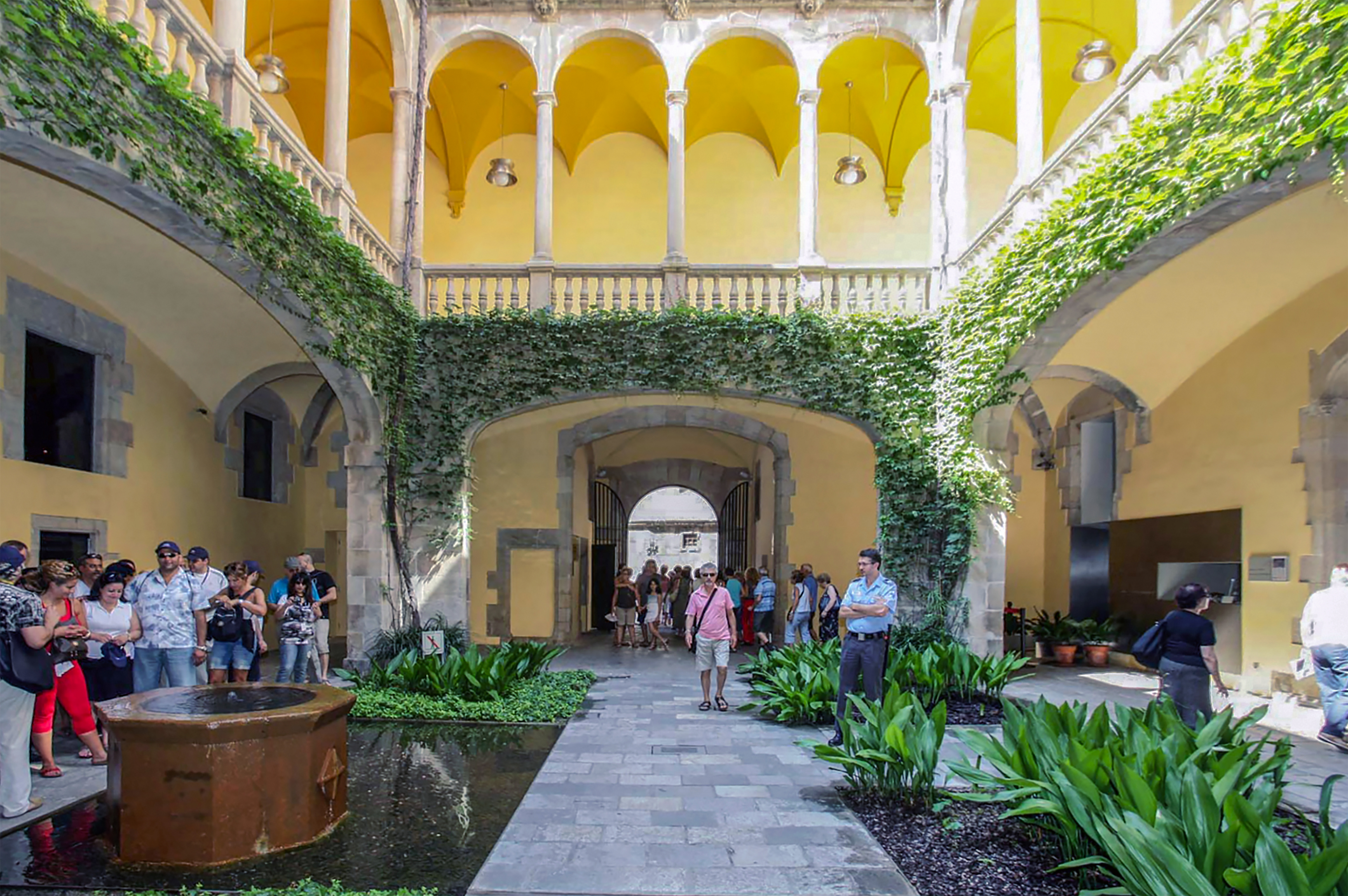
Palau del Lloctinent courtyard

The origins of the archive are collections of scrolls from the clerk's office of the first Counts of Barcelona and Kings of Aragon. Is mentioned for the first time a King's archive in October 25, 1180. In 1194 King Alfonso II of Aragon commissioned the compilation of the documents from the royal archive that were legally valid and could be useful for the rights of the Crown to Ramon de Caldes (jurist), Dean of the Cathedral of Barcelona and jurist. The result was the Liber feudorum maior. Ramon de Caldes himself said that the file was in in ordinatione confusa. With this compilation we know of more than one thousand documents, the oldest of the 9th century.

These early mentions does not mean that there is still a sorted archive but had cataloged several scrolls that could be geographically dispersed, and usually do not take these statements as a precedent for the current archive. The first mention of a real document depot is in 1255. This depot was located at the monastery of Santa Maria de Sixena, then located in the geographic center of the Crown.

The reign of James I of Aragon increased the use of paper, which increased the rate of production of documents and marks the beginning of the record of the royal chancery .

=== Establishment ===
The General Archive was founded in 1318 in Barcelona by the king James II of Aragon the Just as the unified archive of all the territories of the Crown of Aragon. It was the single central archive of the Crown from 1318-1348, in which the Courts of Zaragoza created the Archive of the Kingdom of Aragon. In 1419 the Royal Archives of Valencia where also created, which is where the funds of the courts of economic control of the administration of the kingdom and the Rational Master File of the Kingdom of Valencia were deposited.

In this way, the Royal Archives of Barcelona began to lose their character as a central archive: from Alfonso V documents issued in Naples, only the records were sent to Barcelona, after his death; Ferdinand II delegated to the lieutenant and the Court and his secretaries did not usually send their documents to the Barcelona Archives. Under the Habsburgs, the number of royal documents preserved in Barcelona was reduced considerably, from 1621 onwards the documentation relating to Aragonese and Valencians was sent to the Simancas archive in Castile. Finally, the royal records were no longer transferred to this archive, it only housed those generated in the Principality of Catalonia by the viceroy of Catalonia, and of the royal administration of the kingdoms of Majorca and Sardinia. The royal records and the corresponding viceroys were sent to the royal archives of Zaragoza and Valencia.

=== Reorganization ===
After the War of the Spanish Succession (1701 - 1714), Javier Garma (1740 - 1783) was appointed head of archive. He attempted to create an authentic Archive of the Crown of Aragon by gathering in the Royal Archives of Barcelona all funds of the royal administration of the territories of the former Crown of Aragon. The Garma project inspired the policy of Pròsper de Bofarull, chief of the archive between 1814 and 1849, and creator of the current General Archive of the Crown of Aragon.

From 1318 until 1993, the archive was headquartered in Palau del Lloctinent part of Palau Reial Major (the Royal Palace of Barcelona), and from that date it was partly transferred to Almogàvers street building, so it now has two locations: the historical palace for protocol events, exhibitions and courses, and the newer location for research and curation.

On 20 January 2007, the Spanish government, owner and manager of the Archive, authorized the creation of a Board of Trustees (Catalan: Patronat de l'Arxiu de la Corona d'Aragó, Spanish: Patronato del Archivo de la Corona de Aragón) located in the Lieutenant Palace of Barcelona. Members of this Board are the minister of Culture and the regional presidents of the former kingdoms of the Crown of Aragon (Aragon, Catalonia, the Valencian Community and the Balearic Islands.
