= Lords of Montpellier =

French nobles (986–1344)

The Lordship of Montpellier was a feudal jurisdiction in Languedoc with its centre in the city of Montpellier, that existed between 986 and 1344.

== Formation ==
Ricuin II, the bishop of Mauguio gave these lands in fief to a knight named Guiu I. He was succeeded by his son William I (985–1025) who received more lands around the city and died without descendants. The inheritance fell to his nephew William II, son of Trudgarda (William's sister) and Bernard.

Much younger than its neighbours in the region such as Nîmes, Narbonne, Béziers or Carcassonne, most of which were created in Roman times, the Lordship of Montpellier was only created in the 11th century. Situated between Spain and Italy, close to the Via Domitia and the port of Lattes, the city quickly experienced significant economic and cultural development, attracting gilders, goldsmiths, drapers and money changers. It thus became a centre of trade between northern Europe, Spain and the Mediterranean basin.

== List of lords of Montpellier ==
=== House of Montpellier ===
Arms of the Lords of Montpellier: Argent a torteau Gules.

- William I of Montpellier 26 November 986–1019
- William II of Montpellier 1019–1025, his nephew
- William III of Montpellier 1025–1058, his son
- William IV of Montpellier 1058–1068, his son
- William V of Montpellier 1090–1121, his son
- William VI of Montpellier 1121–1149, his son
- William VII of Montpellier 1149–c. 1172, his son
- William VIII of Montpellier c. 1172–1202, his son
- William IX of Montpellier 1202–1204, his son
- Maria of Montpellier 1204–1213, his sister, married to:
  - Peter II of Aragon, King of Aragon, Count of Roussillon and Cerdagne

The arms of the House of Barcelona: Or four pallets Gules.

=== House of Aragon ===
- James I of Aragon 1213–1276, their son
- James II of Majorca 1276–1311, his second surviving son
- Sancho of Majorca 1311–1324, his son
- James III of Majorca 1324–1344, his nephew

=== French royal domain ===
In 1344 James III sold the Lordship of Montpellier to King Philip VI of France: Montpellier became a possession of the crown of France.

In 1364, following his defeat in the Battle of Cocherel, King Charles II of Navarre negotaited a peace treaty in which he ceded to the French crown Mantes, Meulan and the county of Longueville in Normandy in exchange for the lordship of Montpellier.

== Sources ==
- Lewis, Archibald. The Guillems of Montpellier: A Sociological Appraisal, 1971.
