= Peter II of Aragon =

King of Aragon from 1196 to 1213

Peter II
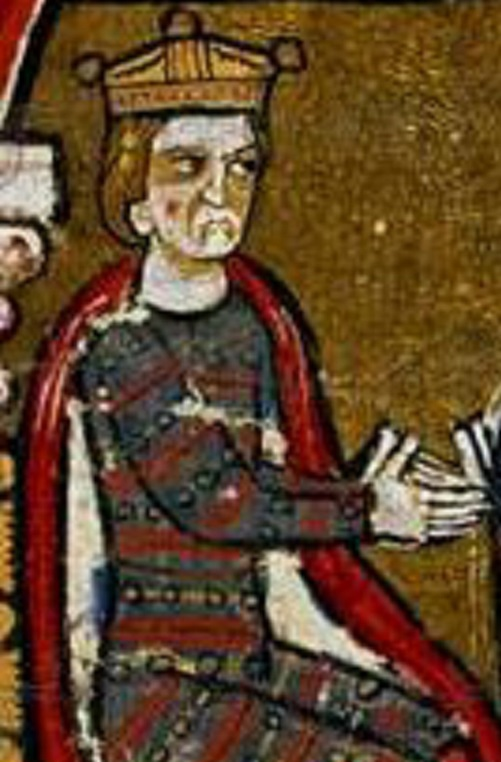
- The only known contemporary image of Peter, Liber feudorum Ceritaniae (1200–1209), pg. 64v.

King of Aragon Count of Barcelona
- Reign: 25 April 1196 – 12 September 1213
- Coronation: 1205 in Rome
- Predecessor: Alfonso II
- Successor: James I
- Born: July 1178; Huesca
- Died: 12 September 1213 (aged 35); Muret
- Burial: Priory of San Juan de Sijena
- Spouse: Marie of Montpellier (m. 1204; died 1213)
- Issue: James I of Aragon
- House: Barcelona
- Father: Alfonso II of Aragon
- Mother: Sancha of Castile

Peter II the Catholic (Catalan: Pere el Catòlic; Aragonese: Pero II o Catolico) (July 1178 – 12 September 1213) was the King of Aragon and Count of Barcelona from 1196 to 1213.

== Background ==
Peter was born in Huesca, the son of Alfonso II of Aragon and Sancha of Castile. In 1205 he acknowledged the feudal supremacy of the papacy and was crowned in Rome by Pope Innocent III, swearing to defend the Catholic faith (hence his epithet, "the Catholic"). He was the first king of Aragon to be crowned by the pope.

In the first decade of the thirteenth century Peter commissioned the Liber feudorum Ceritaniae, an illustrated codex cartulary for the counties of Cerdagne, Conflent, and Roussillon.

== Marriage ==
On 15 June 1204 Peter married (as her third husband) Marie of Montpellier, daughter and heiress of William VIII of Montpellier by Eudocia Comnena. She gave him a son, James, but Peter soon repudiated her. Marie was popularly venerated as a saint for her piety and marital suffering, but was never canonized; she died in Rome in 1213. Marie also perhaps bore Peter II a daughter, "Sancha", at Collioure in October 1205 according to Christian Nique. ("Sancha" was born in 1206 according to other accounts; in 1208 according to Mark Gregory Pegg, but February 1208 is more likely the year the couple's son was born). Sancha was betrothed to Raymond VII the son Count Raymond VI of Toulouse, not long after her birth, according to Nique, only days (sources differ as to how long). The marriage contract included Marie's inheritance, Montpellier, which was to be passed to the child immediately should something happen to Peter, says Nique, citing documents discovered in 1850, something Marie would at first not agree to, but finally agreed to a few months later, stating that she had agreed under pressure. However the child's younger brother James makes no mention of her and Sancha was apparently dead before the New Year, according to Nique's information.

== Warfare ==
Peter participated in the Battle of Las Navas de Tolosa in 1212 which marked the turning point of Muslim domination in the Iberian peninsula.

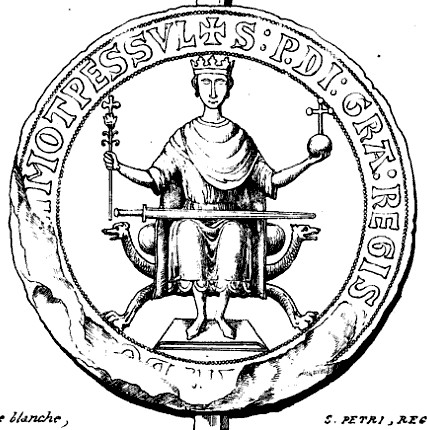
Engraving of a sealing of Peter II, ca 1196 to 1213

The Crown of Aragon was widespread in the area that is now southwestern France, but which at that time was under the control of vassal local princes, such as the Counts of Toulouse. The Cathars or Albigenses rejected the authority and the teachings of the Catholic Church. Innocent called upon Philip II of France to suppress the Albigenses. Under the leadership of Simon de Montfort a campaign was launched. The Albigensian Crusade, begun in 1209, led to the slaughter of approximately 20,000 men, women and children, Cathar and Catholic alike. Over the course of twenty years military campaigns essentially destroyed the previously flourishing civilization of Occitania and by 1229 brought the region firmly under the control of the King of France, and the Capetian dynasty from the north of France.

Peter returned from Las Navas in autumn 1212 to find that Simon de Montfort had conquered Toulouse, exiling Count Raymond VI of Toulouse, who was Peter's brother-in-law and vassal. Peter crossed the Pyrenees and arrived at Muret in September 1213 to confront Montfort's army. He was accompanied by Raymond of Toulouse, who tried to persuade Peter to avoid battle and instead starve out Montfort's forces. This suggestion was rejected.

The Battle of Muret began on 12 September 1213. The Aragonese forces were disorganized and disintegrated under the assault of Montfort's squadrons. Peter himself was caught in the thick of fighting, and died as a result of a courageous last stand. He was thrown to the ground and killed. The Aragonese forces broke in panic when their king was slain and Montfort's crusaders won a crushing victory.

The nobility of Toulouse, vassals of the Crown of Aragon, were defeated. The conflict culminated in the Treaty of Meaux-Paris in 1229, in which the integration of the Occitan territory into the French crown was agreed upon.

Upon Peter's death, the kingdom passed to his only son by Marie of Montpellier, the future James the Conqueror.

== Sources ==
- Sumption, Jonathan. The Albigensian Crusade. 2000.
- (in Spanish) Martín Alvira-Cabrer, 12 de Septiembre de 1213: El Jueves de Muret, Universitat de Barcelona, Barcelona, 2002.
- (in Spanish) Martín Alvira-Cabrer, Muret 1213. La batalla decisiva de la Cruzada contra los Cátaros, Ariel, Barcelona, 2008 and 2013.
- (in Spanish) Martín Alvira-Cabrer, Pedro el Católico, Rey de Aragón y Conde de Barcelona (1196–1213). Documentos, Testimonios y Memoria Histórica, 6 vols., Zaragoza, Institución Fernando el Católico (CSIC), 2010 (on line).
- Nique, Christian (2013), Les deux visages de Marie de Montpellier (1182–1213) (PDF) (in French), Montpellier: Académie des Sciences et Lettres de Montpellier

Regnal titles
Preceded by Alfonso the Troubadour	King of Aragon; Count of Barcelona; 1196–1213	Succeeded by James the Conqueror
