= Cartulary =

Medieval book of charters

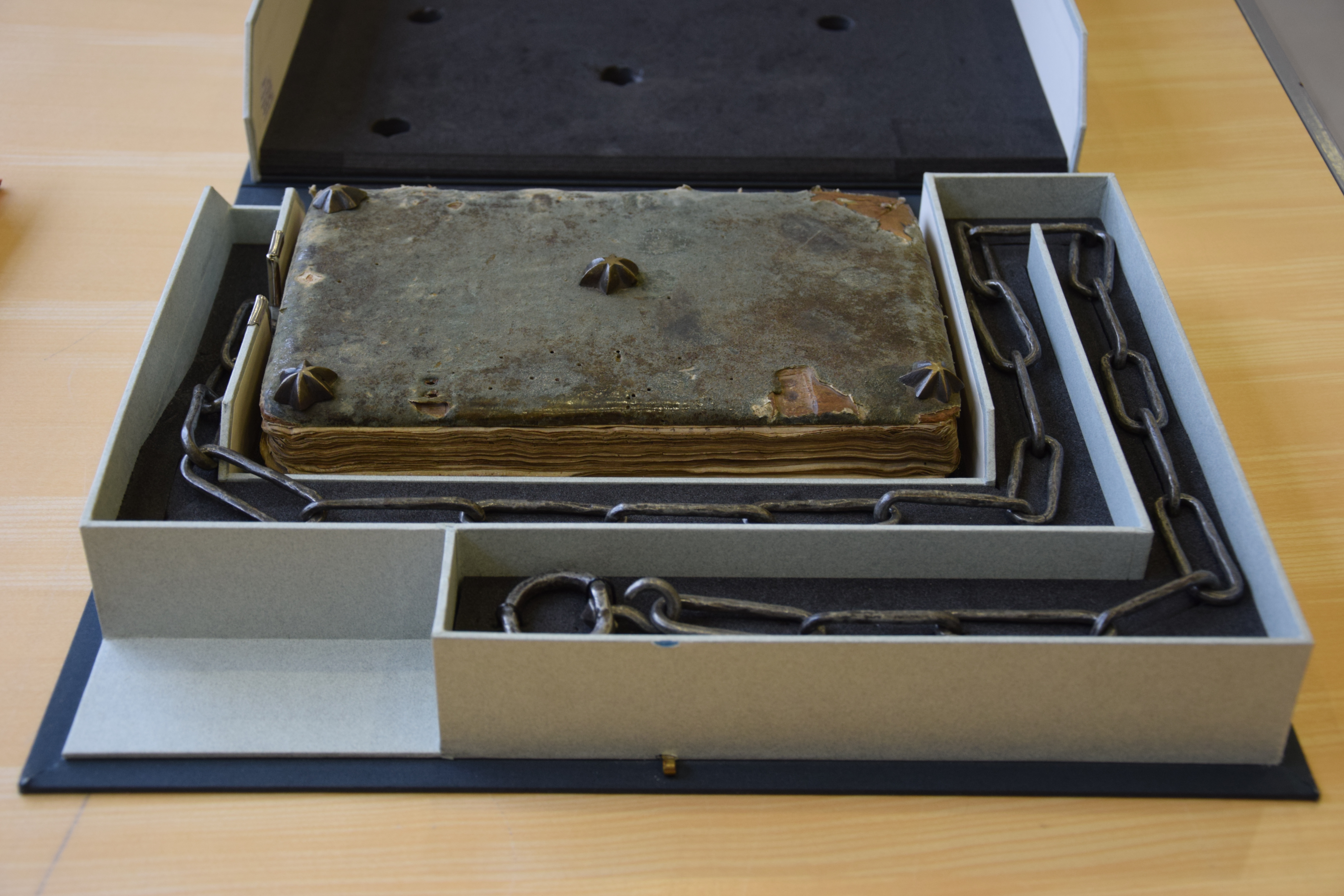
A chained Cartulary from Senlis, northern France.

A cartulary or chartulary (/ˈkɑːrtjʊləri/; Latin: cartularium or chartularium), also called pancarta or codex diplomaticus, is a medieval manuscript volume or roll (rotulus) containing transcriptions of original documents relating to the foundation, privileges, and legal rights of ecclesiastical establishments, municipal corporations, industrial associations, institutions of learning, or families. The term is sometimes also applied to collections of original documents bound in one volume or attached to one another so as to form a roll, as well as to custodians of such collections.

== Definitions ==
Michael Clanchy defines a cartulary as "a collection of title deeds copied into a register for greater security".

A cartulary may take the form of a book or a codex. Documents, chronicles or other kinds of handwritten texts were compiled, transcribed or copied into the cartulary.

In the introduction to the book Les Cartulaires, it is argued that in the contemporary diplomatic world it was common to provide a strict definition as the organized, selective, or exhaustive transcription of diplomatic records, made by the owner of them or by the producer of the archive where the documents are preserved.

In the Dictionary of Archival Terminology a cartulary is defined as "a register, usually in volume form, of copies of charters, title deeds, grants of privileges and other documents of significance belonging to a person, family or institution". In 1938, the French historian, Emile Lesne, wrote: "Every Cartulary is the testimony of the statement of the Archives in a Church at the time when it was compiled".

Related terms in other languages are: cartularium (Latin); Kopiar, Kopialbuch (German), Chartular (Oes.); cartolario, cartulario, cartario (Italian); cartulario (Spanish).

In medieval Normandy, a type of cartulary was common from the early 11th century that combined a record of gifts to the monastery with a short narrative. These works are known as pancartes.

== Development and contents ==
The allusion of Gregory of Tours to chartarum tomi in the 6th century is commonly taken to refer to cartularies. The oldest surviving cartularies, however, originated in the 10th century. Those from the 10th to the 13th centuries are very numerous.

Cartularies frequently contain historical texts, known as cartulary chronicles, which may focus on the history of the monastery whose legal documents it accompanies, or may be a more general history of the world. This link between legal and historical writings has to be understood in the context of the importance of past events for establishing legal precedence.

Sometimes the copyist of the cartulary reproduced the original documents with literal exactness. On the other hand, some copyists took liberties with the text, including modifying the phraseology, modernizing proper names of persons and places, and even changing the substance, so as to extend the scope of the privileges or immunities granted in the document. The value of a cartulary as a historical document depends not only on how faithfully it reproduces the substance of the original, but also, if edited, on the clues it contains to the motivation for those changes. These questions are generally the subject of scrutiny under well-known canons of historical criticism.

== Publication and surveys ==
Many cartularies of medieval monasteries and churches have been published, more or less completely. A listing of all known medieval cartularies of the British Isles, edited by Godfrey Davis, was published in 1958, and republished in a heavily revised and extended edition in 2010: the revised edition contains entries for about 2,000 cartularies, including those of both ecclesiastical establishments and secular corporations, dating from the 11th to 16th centuries, with details of dates, provenance, current location, and (where appropriate) publication. The Catalogue général des cartulaires des archives départementales (Paris, 1847) and the Inventaire des cartulaires etc. (Paris, 1878–9) were the chief sources of information regarding the cartularies of medieval France. There may be more recent developments in cataloguing.

== List of cartularies ==
- Cartularies of Valpuesta, two medieval cartularies from the north of Spain.
- Chartularium Sithiense or Abbey of Saint Bertin's cartulary, written in Latin and whose first part is attributed to Folquin (or Saint Folquin, died 14 December 855 in Esquelbeques)
- Cartulario de Óvila, of the monastery Santa María de Óvila
- Hemming's Cartulary, two cartularies bound together, the Liber Wigorniensis, made in England around the year 1000, and a second compiled by Hemming about a hundred years later. It is now in the British Library.
- Cartulary of Windsheim, O.E.S.A. made in Windsheim in Germany between 1421 and 1462.
- The English Register, a summarised English translation of the Latin charters of the Benedictine Godstow Nunnery, commissioned by abbess Alice Henley
- Liber feudorum maior, a twelfth-century cartulary of the Crown of Aragon
- Liber feudorum formae minoris, an early thirteenth-century continuation of the Liber feudorum maior
- Liber instrumentorum memorialium, an early thirteenth-century cartulary of the Lords of Montpellier
- Liber instrumentorum vicecomitalium, also called the Trencavel Cartulary and the Foix Cartulary, a thirteenth-century French collection
- Liber feudorum Ceritaniae, a thirteenth-century cartulary of the County of Cerdanya
- Supetar cartulary, a twelfth-century cartulary of the monastery of St Peter in Poljice, near Split in Croatia
- The Tropenell Cartulary, from the west of England estates of Thomas Tropenell, 15th century
- The Register of St Osmund, a 13th-century cartulary belonging to Salisbury Cathedral.
- Textus Roffensis (c. 1123), the first part is a collection of primarily secular documents written in Old English, whilst the second part is the cartulary of Rochester Cathedral written in Latin.

== Chartoularios ==
The late Roman/Byzantine chartoularios was an administrative and fiscal official. In the Greek Orthodox Church, the corresponding position was called chartophylax. This title was also given to an ancient officer in the Roman Church, who had the care of charters and papers relating to public affairs. The chartulary presided in ecclesiastical judgments, in lieu of the Pope.

== Sources ==
- Davis, G. R. C.; Breay, Claire; Harrison, Julian; Smith, David M., eds. (2010). Medieval Cartularies of Great Britain. London: British Library. ISBN 9780712350389.
