= William VIII, Lord of Montpellier =

12th-century Lord of Montpellier

William VIII of Montpellier
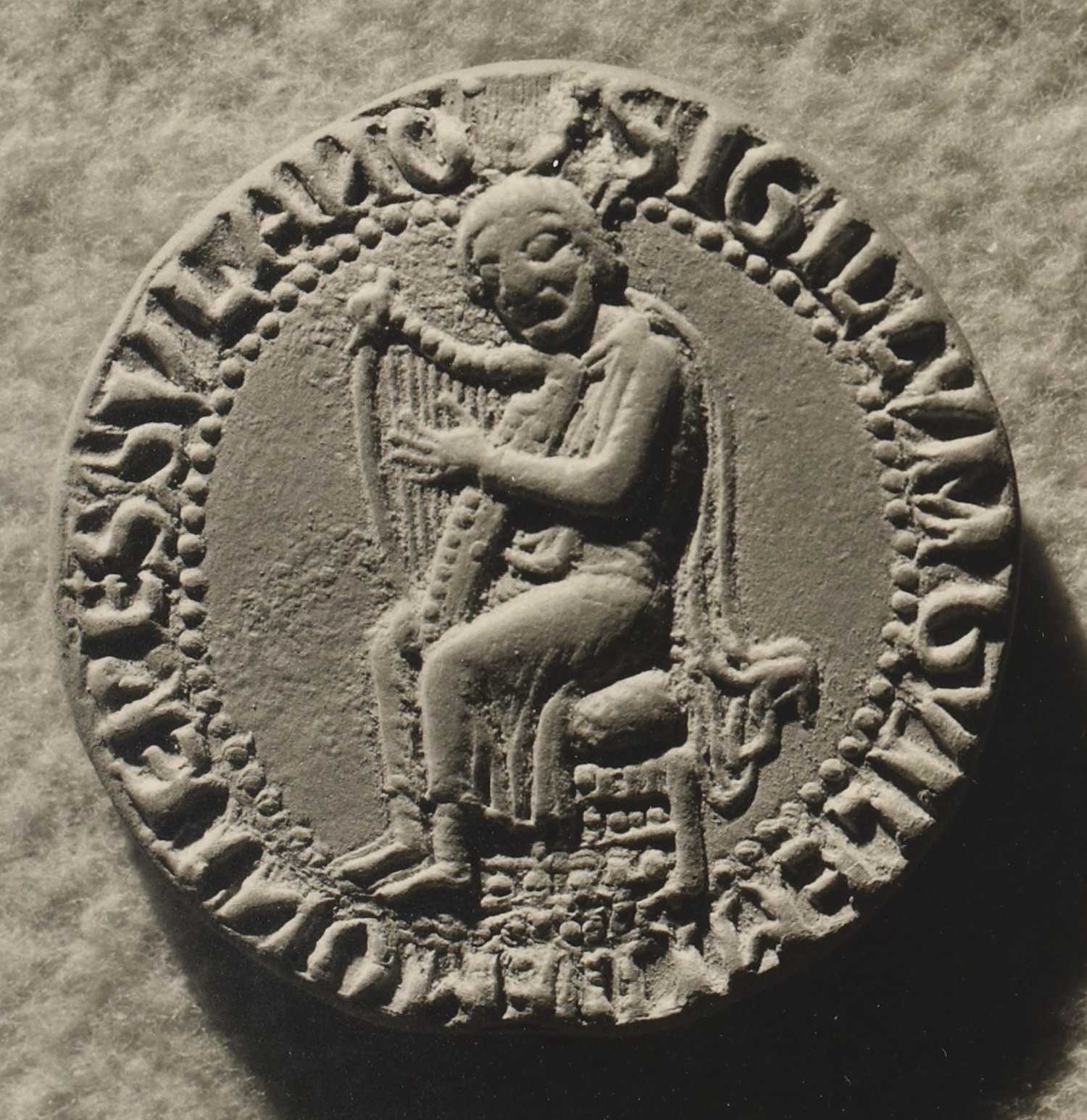
- Died: 1202
- Noble family: Guilhem
- Spouses: Eudokia Komnene; Agnes of Castile
- Father: William VII of Montpellier
- Mother: Matilda of Burgundy

William VIII (in Occitan: Guilhem; died 1202) was Lord of Montpellier, the son of William VII and Matilda of Burgundy.

William VIII married Eudokia Komnene, grand-niece of the Byzantine emperor Manuel I Komnenos. They had one daughter, Marie of Montpellier.

Lacking a male heir, William separated from Eudokia, sending her to a monastery in Ariane.
William then married Agnes of Castile and sired eight more children:

- William IX of Montpellier
- Aymard, d. 1199
- Bernat William, married Jussiana d’Entença, daughter of Ponç Hug d’Entença
- Tortoseta (Thomas)
- Bergunyo, a priest
- Gui, a priest
- Agnes, married in 1203 Raymond Roger Trencavel, viscount of Carcassonne, Béziers, Albi and Razès.
- Adalaïs.

The Pope ruled William's marriage to Agnes as illegitimate and Marie was given the throne.

William VIII was a patron of troubadours. Arnaut de Mareuil came to his court after fleeing from the entourage of Azalais of Toulouse, and at least one of Arnaut's poems is addressed to him.

Titles of nobility
Preceded by William VII	Lord of Montpellier c. 1172–1202	Succeeded by William IX
