= Roger II (disambiguation) =

Roger II most often refers to Roger II of Sicily (died 1154), the first king of Sicily from 1130.

Roger II may also refer to:

- Roger II of Laon (died 942), count
- Roger I of Foix (died 1064), also Roger II of Carcassonne
- Roger II (bishop of Châlons) (died 1065)
- Roger II of Montgomery (died 1094), earl of Shrewsbury
- Roger II of Foix (died 1124), count
- Roger II of Mont Saint-Michel (died 1124), abbot
- Roger II Trencavel (died 1194), vscount of Carcassonne, Béziers, Razès and Albi
- Roger II of Couserans (born 1182), viscount of Couserans, also Roger I of Pallars Sobirà
- Roger II of Pallars Sobirà (died 1256), count

== See also ==
- Roger I
- Roger III
- Roger IV
