= Raymond Trencavel =

Raymond Trencavel may refer to:

- Raymond I Trencavel (died 1167)
- Raymond II Trencavel (1207–1265)
- Raymond Roger Trencavel (1185–1209)
