= Pons d'Arsac =

Pons d'Arsac was the Archbishop of Narbonne from 1162 until 1181. He was archbishop at an important time in the history of Narbonne and Languedoc in general; a time when the Roman Catholic Church denounced the local religious way of life as heretical.

In 1165, Pons called a council (or colloquy) at Lombers, near Albi, to deal with the spreading Catharism in his archdiocese, largely in response to the council held at Tours in 1163 under Pope Alexander III. The council was a public debate between Cathars (who called themselves bos-homes or bos Crestias) and orthodox Catholic delegates. Constance, daughter of Louis VI of France, and most of the citizens of Albi and Lombers were present and the decision of the council in favour of orthodoxy is still preserved. The judges of the council had been decided upon by representatives of both the Cathars and the Catholics and the latter had been forced to agree to argue solely on New Testament grounds.

In 1166, Pons solemnly confirmed the decision of Lombers at a council in Capestang. However, the power and influence of the heretics was so demoralising to the faithful that some Cistercian monks from Villemagne near Agde abandoned their vows and their monastery to marry and the archbishop was unable to compel them to return without papal interference, which was probably ineffectual as well. In 1173, both Pons and Ermengard of Narbonne sent separate pleas to Louis VII of France for aid against, in Pons' words, "the oppression of heretics" which put "the ship of Saint Peter ... in danger of sinking."

In 1176, Pons was granted all the vicecomital rights in the town of Ferrals by Ermengard of Narbonne "for his fidelity and service." Pons was a close ally of Ermengard and they shared, on very amicable terms, the lordship in the city of Narbonne.

In 1178, Pons was part of a mission appointed by the kings of England and France, made up of the papal legate, Cardinal Peter of S. Crisogono, the Cistercian abbot of Clairvaux Henry of Marcy, Jean des Bellesmains, Peter of Pavia, and Garin, Archbishop of Bourges which was sent to fight Catharism and those lords of Languedoc who supported it or refused to actively campaign against it, among other perceived persecutors of the Church. Pons was the only member of the legation who came from the region to which it was sent and he was therefore most intimately aware of its politics.

In 1179, he attended the Third Lateran Council. Upon his return, in accordance with the twenty-seventh canon of III Lateran, he pronounced excommunication on Raymond V of Toulouse, Roger II of Carcassonne, and Bernard Ato VI of Nîmes. The twenty seventh canon prohibited the use of mercenaries, such as routiers, coterills, bascules, and Aragonese.

In 1181, Henry of Marcy returned as legate to Languedoc and this time deposed Pons from his archdiocese. The exact reasons for his deposition are not known, though a thirteenth-century Cistercian chronicle from Clairvaux says that he was "ineffective and blameworthy", but such a statement lacks any specification of fault. It is possible that archbishop had raised Henry's ire in the preceding legation by questioning the piety of Raymond of Toulouse, who had called in the Cistercians for aid against heresy, but who was an enemy of Pons close ally, Ermengard of Narbonne. Or perhaps he had been too closely aligned with Ermengard's ally, Roger of Carcassonne, to whom the papal legates took great offence. Whatever the case, not only Pons, but also three archdeacons and the sacristan were removed from the church of Narbonne and Pope Lucius III described it as "deprived of all personnel."

== Sources ==
- Cheyette, Fredric L. Ermengard of Narbonne and the World of the Troubadours. Ithaca: Cornell University Press, 2001.
- Graham-Leigh, Elaine. The Southern French Nobility and the Albigensian Crusade. Woodbridge: The Boydell Press, 2005. ISBN 1-84383-129-5
- Graham-Leigh, Elaine. "Hirelings and Shepherds: Archbishop Berenguer of Narbonne (1191-1211) and the Ideal Bishop." The English Historical Review, Vol. 116, No. 469. (Nov., 2001), pp 1083–1102.
- Lea, Henry Charles. A History of the Inquisition in the Middle Ages. Vol. 1. London: Sampson Low, Marston, Searle & Rivington, 1888.
