= Henry of Marcy =

Catholic cardinal bishop and abbot

Cardinal Henri de Marcy
- Cardinal Bishop
- Diocese: Albano (1189–1197)
- Elected: 11 March 1179
- Other post: Abbot of Clairvaux (1177–1179)

Orders
- Consecration: 6 May 1179 by Pope Alexander III
- Created cardinal: December 1182 by Pope Alexander III
- Rank: Cardinal Bishop

Personal details
- Born: c. 1136 Chateau de Marcy, Burgundy
- Died: 1 January 1189 (aged 52–53) Arras, Flanders
- Buried: Arras
- Residence: Hautecombe (Savoy), Clairvaux, Rome, Verona
- Occupation: heretic hunter, diplomat, administrator, courtier
- Profession: Cistercian monk, bishop

Henry of Marcy, or Henry de Marsiac, (c. 1136 – 1 January 1189) was a Cistercian abbot, first of Hautecombe in Savoy (1160–1177), and then of Clairvaux, from 1177 until 1179. He was created Cardinal Bishop of Albano by Pope Alexander III at the Third Lateran Council in 1179.

Henry was an important figure in the fight against the late-12th-century movements of Catharism and Waldensianism and was prominent at the Third Lateran Council. He supported the use of force to suppress heresy and a strong alliance between secular and ecclesiastic authority in the use of force.

== Early life ==
Henry, the son of noble but by no means royal parents, was named after his birthplace, Castro Marsiaco, or the Château de Marcy, near Cluny in Burgundy. He joined the Cistercian order in 1155 or 1156, becoming a monk at Clairvaux, under Abbot Robert, the second abbot of Clairvaux (August 1153 to April 1157). Four years after his profession as a monk, he was sent as the first abbot of the daughter house of Hautecombe in Savoy.

Following the murder of Abbot Gerard of Clairvaux by one of his own monks, Henry was elected seventh Abbot of Clairvaux in 1177. Shortly thereafter, in the same or the next year, having been ordered to preach the crusade, Abbot Henry was able to persuade the abbey's principal patron, Henry I, Count of Champagne, to take the crusader's cross, which he did around Christmas (1177?). He announced his achievement with great pleasure to Pope Alexander III, who had for many years been at odds with Count Henry.

In September 1177, Count Raymond V of Toulouse sent a letter to the Cistercian General Chapter, which was meeting at Citeux under the presidency of Abbot Alexander, for a mission to help him deal with the heresy of Catharism which was rampant in his domains and growing bolder. He remarks that he had already asked the king of France to take part in his action. He was wielding the temporal sword, since the spiritual sword had no effect. He asked for their advice and their prayers.

Dismayed at the advance of the Albigensian (Cathar) heresy in Aquitaine and Languedoc, King Henry II of England and King Louis VII of France decided to organize a mission to preach the true faith to the heretics. The leaders, who were expected to preach personally, were Cardinal Peter of S. Crisogono, the papal legate, the archbishop of Bourges, Archbishop Pons d'Arsac of Narbonne, Bishop Reginald of Bath and Wells, Bishop Jean des Bellesmains of Poitiers, Abbot Henry of Clairvaux, and many other ecclesiastics. The two kings also appointed Raymond V of Toulouse, the vicount of Turenne, and Raymond of Castro Novo to assist the cardinal and his associates. In a decree condemning certain heretics, Cardinal Petrus, the papal legate, remarked that the noblemen had been sent to rescue the bishop of Albi who was being held in the territory of Vicount Roger of Béziers on his order. They were accompanied by Bishop Reginald fitz Jocelin of Bath and Wells and Abbot Henry of Marcy, whose mission, as assigned by the papal legate, was, according to Henry himself, to get Vicount Roger to release the bishop of Albi and eliminate heretical opinions in the entire territory. The party arrived at Castres, the residence of the vicount's family, and, when Roger refused to comply, they excommunicated him. The mission, however, did not succeed in liberating the bishop of Albi, controlling Vicount Roger, or converting the schismatics of Béziers or Castres.

After his return from Toulouse, Henry attended the general synod of the Cistercian Order, and then hastened to Clairvaux.

Abbot Henry presided over the transfer of the remains of Bernard of Clairvaux from his tomb to a newly constructed monument, erected at the orders of Henry.

In 1178, on the death of Bishop Bertrand, Henry was elected bishop of Toulouse, but he wrote to Pope Alexander, begging to be released from the honor. He remarked that he was looking forward to seeing the pope face to face at the coming general council. Peter of Celle also wrote the pope a letter, stating more forthrightly the reasons why Henry wished to decline the bishopric.

Through the influence of Abbot Henry, King Henry II of England presented the abbey of Clairvaux with a new lead roof for the abbey church.

== Cardinal and papal legate ==
Abbot Henry attended Pope Alexander's Third Lateran Council, whose first session took place in the Lateran Basilica on 5 March 1179. On 11 March, Henry was appointed Bishop of Albano. He was consecrated a bishop by Alexander III personally on the Sunday after Easter, 6 May 1179, in the church of S. Maria called Narcissae. His earliest subscription as a cardinal to a papal document, a privilege granted to the canons of the cathedral of Concordia, came on 4 May 1179. His latest subscription for Pope Alexander took place on 8 December 1179. From 1180 to the Fall of 1182, he was in France, serving as papal legate against the Albigensian heretics.

In 1180, the legate Cardinal Henry of Marcy presided over a synod held at Limoges, dealing with a conflict between two churches in the diocese of Bordeaux, which had persisted through much of the 12th century. He held another synod at Nôtre Dame de Puy on 15 September 1181. Since Pope Alexander died in Rome on 30 August 1181, Cardinal Henry did not attend the election of his successor, Pope Lucius III (Ubaldo Allucingoli), on 1 September 1181.

In 1181, the legate Henry, in association with Jean de Montlaur, the bishop of Maguelonne (later Montpellier), and Bernard, the bishop of Béziers (Biterrensis), deposed Pons d'Arsac, the bishop of Narbonne, as well as three archdeacons and the sacristan of the cathedral chapter. The reasons for the deposition are unknown. The action was appealed to Rome, but, on 16 May 1183, Pope Lucius affirmed the decision of the bishops, evidently considering their reasons sufficient, and ordered the cathedral chapter of Narbonne to obey Henry's injunctions.

At Bazas, he held a synod on 24 November 1181. He held a synod at Limoges on 28 February 1182. He was in Poitiers on 1 April 1182, where he signed a document.

On 19 May 1182, Cardinal Henry, the Papal legate, was in Paris, and, with Bishop Maurice de Sully, consecrated the high altar of the newly completed choir of Notre-Dame de Paris.

He was back in Italy by 23 November 1182, when he began subscribing documents for Pope Lucius at Velletri, where the papal court was living in exile from Rome.

=== Suppression of the Cathars ===
In September 1177, Raymond V of Toulouse made a request to the Cistercian General Chapter for a legatine mission to help him deal with the heresy of Catharism which was rampant in his domains. On 13 September 1177, the Cistercian General Chapter decided to send Henry to Languedoc at the head of a papal legation which included Peter of Pavia, Cardinal Priest of S. Crisogono; Jean des Bellesmains, Bishop of Poitiers; Pons d'Arsac, Archbishop of Narbonne; and Gerard, Archbishop of Bourges. Roger of Howden may have accompanied him, as he is the source for the only account of the mission and he includes Henry's letter summarising their accomplishments. On the other hand, he also relied heavily on the letters between Henry and Pietro di San Chrysogono.

Henry encountered Peter Waldo in 1180, extracting from him a profession of orthodox Catholic faith.

Henry returned to the Languedoc in 1181 and led a military attack on Roger's town of Lavaur, which Roger's wife Adelaide immediately surrendered to him without giving a fight. Henry then went on to depose Pons d'Arsac from his see for being "useless and reprehensible." The 1181 expedition received mention in Gaufred de Vigeois and the Chronicon Clarevallensis besides Roger of Howden's Chronicon.

== Preaching the crusade ==
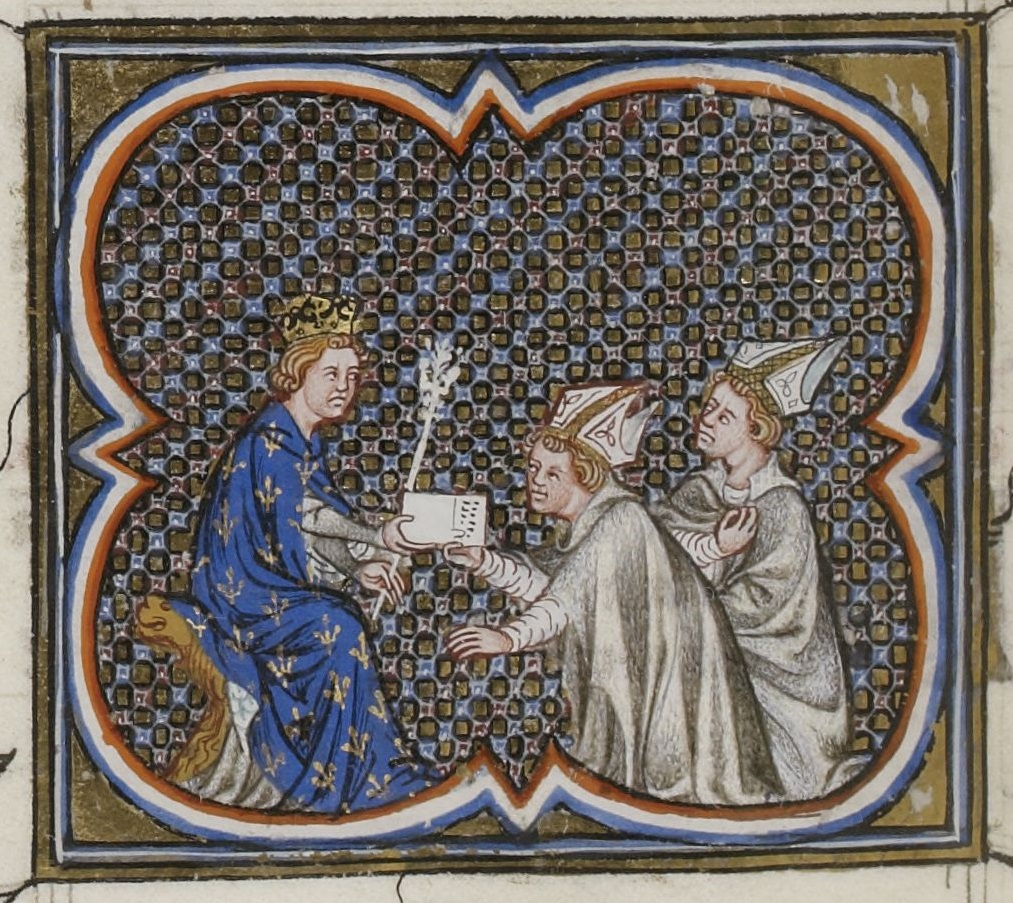
Philippe Auguste receiving messengers from the Pope calling him to the crusade

Towards the end of his life, Cardinal Henry sought the papal crown. In October 1187, when the papal court had reached Ferrara, he became a candidate to succeed Pope Urban III. He had two competitors in the election, Paolo Scolari and Alberto di Morra. In a dramatic speech, Henry withdrew from the competition, announcing that he wanted to preach the crusade, and Alberto di Morra was elected.

He subscribed for the new pope, Gregory VIII, from 31 October 1187 to 13 November 1187. At that point he was appointed papal legate to France, to attempt to arrange a peace between Philip II and Henry II. He travelled to Flanders, to Count Philip, so as not to favor either king with private conversations. He preached the Third Crusade, and was in Liège in March 1188.

He did a great deal to mediate between the leaders of the Crusade before his death at Arras, bringing Henry II of England and Philip II of France to reconcile, as well as healing the rift between the Emperor Frederick I and Philip I, Archbishop of Cologne. It was at the Tag Gottes ("God's Day") held in Mainz on 27 March 1188 that he induced Frederick to join the Crusade. His letter to the notables of the German kingdom about the event is preserved.

He died in Flanders in July, and was buried at Arras. The Cistercians celebrate his day on 14 July. The "Chronicon Clarevallense", however, states that he died on 1 January. He is considered beatified.

Among his surviving works, his letters (Epistolae) and his De peregrinante civitate Dei are published in the Patrologia Latina. They are individually analyzed and commented upon in the Histoire litteraire de la France Volume XIV.

== Sources ==
- Bruni, Gerardo (1932). "ENRICO di Marcy, vescovo di Albano." (in Italian) Enciclopedia Italiana (1932). [online at Treccani]
- Friedrich Wilhelm Bautz (1990). "Heinrich von Clairvaux". In Bautz, Friedrich Wilhelm (ed.). Biographisch-Bibliographisches Kirchenlexikon (BBKL) (in German). Vol. 2. Hamm: Bautz. cols. 673–674. ISBN 3-88309-032-8.
- Cheyette, Fredric L. Ermengard of Narbonne and the World of the Troubadours. Ithaca: Cornell University Press, 2001. ISBN 0-8014-3952-3
- Congar, Y. M.-J. "Henri de Marcy, abbé de Clairvaux, cardinal-évêque d'Albano et légat pontifical." Analecta monastica, ed. J. Leclercq. Rome, 1958.
- Graham-Leigh, Elaine. The Southern French Nobility and the Albigensian Crusade. Woodbridge: The Boydell Press, 2005. ISBN 1-84383-129-5
- Kienzle, Beverly Mayne. Cistercians, Heresy and Crusade in Occitania, 1145–1229: Preaching in the Lord's Vineyard. 2001. review
- Robinson, I. S. The Papacy, 1073–1198: Continuity and Innovation. Cambridge University Press, 1990.
- Watterich, J. B. M. (1862). Pontificum Romanorum qui fuerunt inde ab exeunte saeculo IX usque ad finem saeculi XIII vitae: ab aequalibus conscriptae (in Latin). Vol. Tomus II. Leipzig: G. Engelmann.
- Dictionnaire des noms, surnoms et pseudonymes latins de l'histoire littéraire du Moyen Age (1100 à 1530). (in French) ed. Alfred Franklin, Bibliothèque Mazarine. Paris: Librairie de Firmin-Didot et Cie, 1875.
- "Henri, Abbé de Haute-Combe, puis de Clairvaux, et enfin Cardinal Evêque d'Albano." (in French) Histoire litteraire de la France. Tome XIV. Paris: Firmin Didot 1817. pp. 451–462.

=== For further reading ===
- Graham-Leigh, Elaine. "Hirelings and Shepherds: Archbishop Berenguer of Narbonne (1191–1211) and the Ideal Bishop." The English Historical Review, Vol. 116, No. 469. (Nov. 2001), pp 1083–1102. [one passing reference]
