= County of Carcassonne =

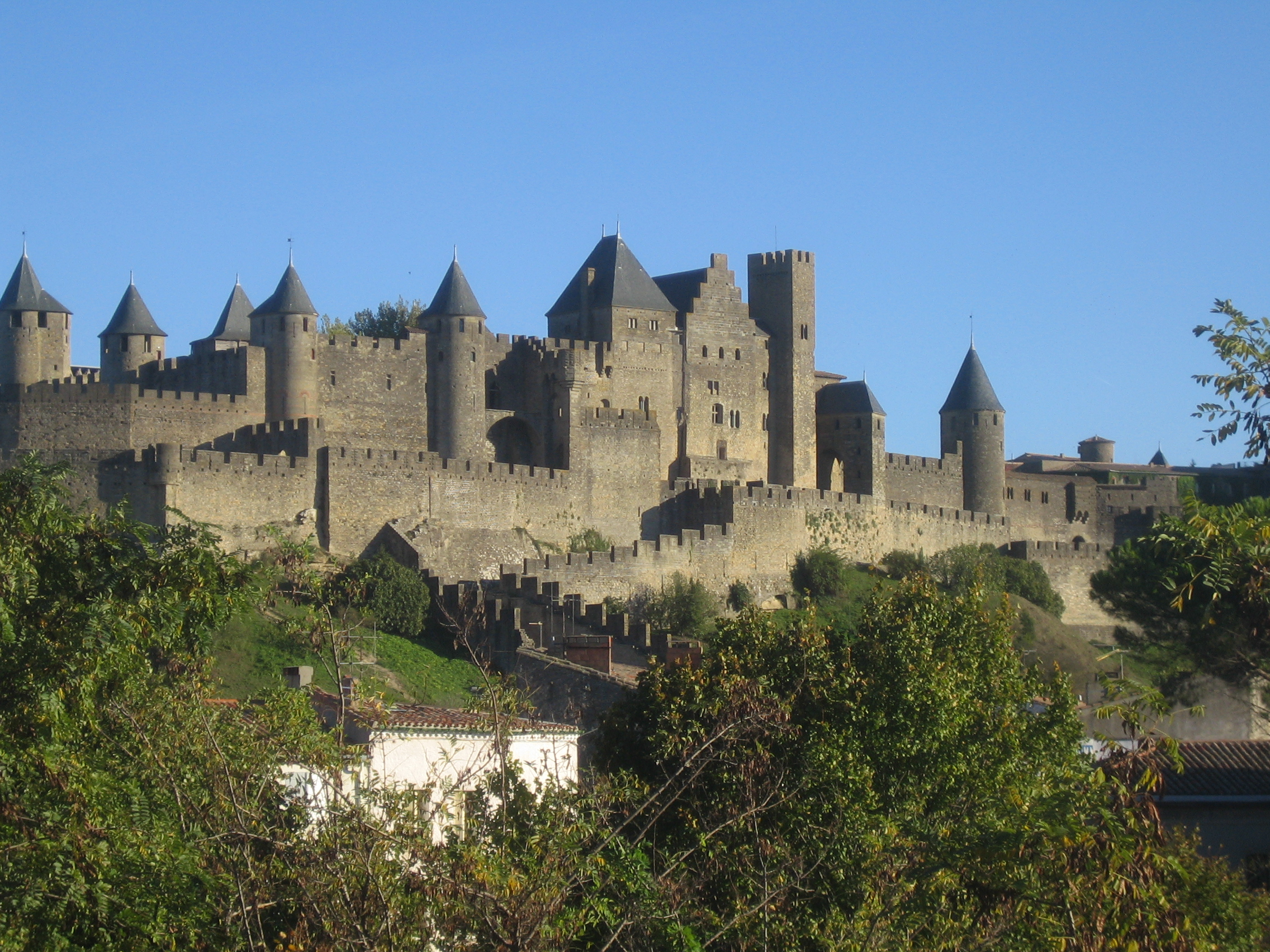

The County of Carcassonne (Occitan: Comtat de Carcassona) was a medieval fiefdom controlling the city of Carcassonne, France, and its environs. It was often united with the County of Razès.

The origins of Carcassonne as a county probably go back to the Visigothic period in Septimania, but the first count known by name is Bello of the time of Charlemagne. Bello founded a dynasty, the Bellonids, which would rule many honores in Septimania and Catalonia for the centuries.

Bello was a loyal Carolingian follower and his successor in the county were Carolingian appointees down to about the time of Oliba II, at which point the counties in the outlying regions were beginning to become hereditary possessions in the hands of locally well-endowed families. After Oliba, who ruled both Carcassonne and Razès, his patrimony was ruled jointly by his sons and grandsons. On the death of Acfred II in 933, Carcassonne passed to a woman and, by marriage, to the counts of Comminges.

The counts of Comminges continued the practice, extensive in the Midi, of associating brothers, sons, grandsons, and nephews in the government. In 1068, however, Carcassonne was divided among the three daughters of Peter II. In 1069, they sold their comital rights to Raymond Berengar I of Barcelona. The county was subsumed within Barcelona thereafter, though a viscounty was created in 1082 by Raymond Berengar II.

== Counts of Carcassonne ==
=== Bellonid Dynasty ===
- 790 – 810 Bello
- 810 – 821 Guisclafred, son of Bello
- 821 – 837 Oliba I, son of Bello

=== Guilhemides (Williami) ===
- 837 – 844 Bernard, also count of Barcelona, son of Saint William of Gellone

=== Visigoth rulers ===
- 844 – 845 Argila, son of Bera, first count of Barcelona
- 845 – 850 Bera II, also count of Razès
- 850 Miro Eutil

=== House of Rouergue ===
- 850 – 852 Fredelo, also count of Toulouse, son of Fulcoald of Rouergue
- 852 – 863 Raymond I, also count of Toulouse, son of Fulcoald of Rouergue

=== Hunfridings ===
- 863 – 864 Humphrey, also count of Barcelona

=== Bellonid Dynasty ===
- 865 – 872 Oliba II, son of Oliba I

=== Guilhemides (Williami) ===
- 872 Bernard II, also count of Barcelona, son of Bernard I, count of Poitou

=== Bellonid Dynasty ===
- 872 – 877 Oliba II, second time
- 877 – 906 Acfred I, son of Oliba I
- 906 – 908 Bencion I, son of Oliba II
- 908 – 934 Acfred II, son of Oliba II
- 934 Arsenda, daughter of Acfred II
  - 934 – 957 Arnold, also count of Comminges, husband of Arsenda. See House of Comminges below.

=== House of Comminges ===
- 957 – 1012 Roger I, son of Arsenda of Carcassonne and Arnold of Comminges
  - until 1010 Raymond II Roger, son of Roger I
  - until 1010 Peter I Roger, son of Roger I
- 1012 – 1034 William I, nephew of Roger I
  - 1012 – 1034 Peter II
- 1034 – 1068 Raymond II, second time
  - 1034 – 1059 Peter II, second time
  - from 1034 Peter III
  - from 1034 Bernard II
- 1068 – 1069 Garsenda,Ermengarde, and Adelaide, daughters of Peter II

Sold to County of Barcelona.

== Viscounts of Carcassonne and Razès ==
In 1069, Garsenda, Ermengarde, and Adelaide sold their comital rights to Carcassonne to Count Ramon Berenguer I of Barcelona. At some point, Ermengarde married Raymond Bernard of Nîmes, a member of the Trencavel family. Their son, Bernard Ato IV, retook Carcassonne in 1125.

=== Trencavels ===
- 1101 – 1129 Bernard Ato IV
- 1129 – 1150 Roger I, son of Bernard Ato IV
- 1150 – 1167 Raymond I, son of Bernard Ato IV
- 1167 – 1194 Roger II, son of Raymond I
- 1194 – 1209 Raymond Roger, son of Roger II
- 1224 – 1226 Raymond II, son of Raymond Roger

=== House of Montfort ===
- 1209 – 1218 Simon IV de Montfort, son of Simon de Montfort, lord of Montfort l'Amaury
- 1218 – 1224 Amaury de Montfort, son of Simon IV

Annexed to Crown of France between 1226 and 1240 and from 1247 permanently.
