= Trencavel =

Occitan noble family (900s–1200s)

Coat of arms of the Trencavel family

Map depicting Trencavel Lands

The Trencavel family was an important French noble family in Languedoc between the 10th and 13th centuries. The name "Trencavel" began as a nickname and later became the family's surname. The name may derive from the Occitan words for "Nutcracker" (trenca avelana). The name was traditionally restricted in actual use only to those family members named Raymond, but the last Trencavel viscount, Raymond II, preferred the surname over his given name and adopted it for his charters.

The first well-known member of the family was Ato I, viscount of Albi in the early 10th century. He was followed by five generations of viscounts of Albi in direct father-to-son descent. During this same period the family came to dominate the episcopacy of Languedoc. Each of the viscounts from Ato II on had a younger brother named Frotarius (or Frothaire) who was a bishop, be it of Albi, Cahors, or Nîmes.

== History ==
In 1069, the three daughters of Peter II of Carcassonne sold the Counties of Carcassonne, Razès, the Béziers and Agde to Raymond Berengar I of Barcelona for 4,000 mancusos. By marriage to Ermengard, daughter of Peter II, Raymond Bernard, son of Bernard Ato III, became viscount of Carcassonne. He had already acquired Nîmes. By 1070, he was viscount of Béziers. His son Bernard Ato IV was viscount of Albi, Béziers, Carcassonne, Nîmes, and Razès. He thus held all the lands of the counts of Carcassonne, but never assumed the comital title. Bernard Ato was formally proclaimed viscount after the death of his mother in 1101.

=== Division ===
The sons of Ato IV divided their inheritance. The eldest, Roger I, took Albi, Carcassonne, and Razès, but had no children. The second, Raymond I took Béziers and Agde. The youngest, Bernard Ato V, inherited Nîmes and married Guilhelma, daughter of William VI of Montpellier. In 1132, Roger and Raymond agreed that in the event of Roger's death without heirs, Carcassonne would pass to Raymond. In 1150, Roger died and his three viscounties all passed to Raymond. After a series of disputes, the viscounty of Agde was divided between Raymond and Bernard Ato, with the latter holding the title. The elder branch of Béziers-Albi-Carcassonne-Razès and the younger of Nîmes-Agde were to remain separate for the remainder of the family's existence. The practical capital of the elder branch was Béziers.

During this period considerable urban unrest emerged as the growing cities tried to assert their independence. Raymond I was killed during one such revolt in Béziers. There were also revolts in Carcassonne in 1107 and 1120–1124, during which four years the Trencavel were expelled from the city.

The Trencavels' lands in the centre of Languedoc gave them considerable power in the 11th and 12th centuries. The counts of Barcelona and Toulouse both had large territories to the east and west, and valued a potential alliance with a family that stood in the middle. For the most part, the Trencavels allied with Barcelona against Toulouse. But as a result of the Albigensian Crusade, the last Trencavels lost their lands and titles.

=== Decline ===
Roger II, son of Raymond I, inherited his father's four viscounties. His son, Raymond Roger, also held them, but was captured after the fall of Carcassonne to the Crusaders. He died in prison at the end of 1209. Meanwhile, Bernard Ato VI, son of Bernard Ato V, ceded his rights as viscount of Nîmes and Agde to the Crusading leader Simon de Montfort in 1214. Raymond Roger's son, Raymond II, formally ceded his titles in 1210, though he reclaimed Carcassonne in 1224, only to lose it to Louis VIII of France in 1226. He continued to call himself viscount until 1247, when he once again formally ceded his rights, this time to Louis IX, and symbolically broke his vicecomital seals, after several failed attempts to recover his patrimony. He and his sons are the last known Trencavels, ruling only the castle of Limoux.

Raymond II's granddaughter was living at Cesseras in 1332, but the family disappears thereafter.

== List of ruling members ==
Viscount	Viscounties
Ato I (died early 10th century)	Albi
Bernard Ato I (died 937)	Albi
Ato II (died 942)	Albi
Bernard Ato II (died 990)	Albi
Aton III (died 1030)	Albi
Bernard Ato III (died 1060)	Albi
Raymond Bernard (died 1074)	Albi, Béziers, Carcassonne and Nîmes
Bernard Ato IV (died 1129)	Agde, Albi, Béziers, Carcassonne, Nîmes and Razès
Roger I (died 1150)	Albi, Carcassonne and Razès
Bernard Ato V (died 1163)	Agde and Nîmes
Raymond I (died 1167)	Agde, Albi, Béziers, Carcassonne and Razès
Roger II (died 1194)	Albi, Béziers, Carcassonne and Razès
Raymond Roger (died 1209)	Albi, Béziers, Carcassonne and Razès
Bernard Ato VI (died after 1214)	Agde and Nîmes
Raymond II (died 1263/7)	Albi, Béziers, Carcassonne and Razès

== Sources ==
- Costen, Michael D. (2006). "Trencavel, Family". In Alan V. Murray (ed.). The Crusades: An Encyclopedia. Vol. 4 vols. ABC-CLIO. vol. 3, p. 1192.
- Graham-Leigh, Elaine (2005). The Southern French Nobility and the Albigensian Crusade. Boydell Press. ISBN 9781843831297.
