= Roger I =

Roger I may refer to:

In chronological order

- Roger I of Carcassonne (died 1012), Count of Carcassonne
- Roger I of Tosny (fl. 1013–c. 1040), Norman noble
- Roger I "de Berkeley" (died 1093), Norman noble, possibly the son of Roger I of Tosny - see Baron Berkeley
- Roger I of Sicily (1031–1101), Norman ruler of Sicily
- Roger I Trencavel (died 1150), Viscount of Albi, Carcassonne, and Razès
- Roger I of Fézensaguet (1190–1245), Viscount of Fézensaguet
