= Bernard Ato VI =

Viscount of Nîmes and Agde

Bernard Ato VI (born c. 1159) was the posthumous son and successor of Bernard Ato V, Viscount of Nîmes and Agde. He reigned from 1163 until 1214, when he surrendered his fiefs to Simon de Montfort, Earl of Leicester and leader of the Albigensian Crusade. Bernard Ato was not connected with Catharism, nor were his lands, but his relationship to Raymond Roger Trencavel (his first cousin) may have marked him off as an enemy of the Crusade by default, for he was a Trencavel, though he did not carry that name.

In 1179, Roger II Trencavel, Raymond V of Toulouse, and Bernard Ato had all been excommunicated by Pons d'Arsac under the twenty-seventh canon of the Third Lateran Council for their lack of strong opposition to heresy. In that same year Bernard Ato did homage to Alfonso II of Aragon for his viscounties and made an alliance with Alfonso against Raymond V.

In June 1187, Bernard Ato granted all his lands within the Diocese of Agde (omnes dominationes vicecomitatus) to the diocese and was then accepted into the cathedral church as a canon. In July, the donation was confirmed by Raymond V and in August Bernard Ato also, confirmed it in an extensive charter. The viscounty was de facto handed over to the bishop. He is also said by some authors to have given over Nîmes to Raymond that year, but this is contradicted by other sources.

Bernard Ato swore fealty to William VIII of Montpellier for part of his domains in 1189, January 1191, and finally 1195. On 2 May 1214 Bernard Ato and his wife Guillelma signed over their viscounties to Simon de Montfort, 5th Earl of Leicester, the leader of the Albigensian Crusade.
