= Raymond II Trencavel =

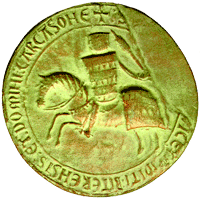
- Seal of Raymond II Trencavel, c.1248.
- Born: 1204 (likely Carcassonne)
- Died: 1263/1267
- Noble family: Trencavel
- Issue: Roger; Raymond-Roger
- Father: Raymond Roger Trencavel
- Mother: Agnès of Montpellier

Raymond II Trencavel (also spelled Raimond; 1207 – 1263/1267) was the last ruler of the branch of the Trencavel viscounts of Béziers. His entire life was occupied by efforts to reverse the downfall the Trencavel had experienced during the Albigensian Crusade, but he ultimately failed.

== Biography ==
=== The Albigensian Crusade ===
Raymond was only two years old when his father, Raymond Roger, died in prison on 10 November 1209. He would have automatically inherited the viscounties of Béziers, Carcassonne, Albi, and Razès, but Carcassonne was granted to Simon de Montfort immediately after Raymond Roger's death and Albi was granted to him in June 1210. On 25 November 1209, Agnes, Raymond's mother and guardian, relinquished her dowry in the Pézenas and Tourbes, which would have gone to Raymond, to Simon in exchange for a pension of 3,000 solidi annually and compensation of 25,000 solidi for her dowry, to be made in four annual payments. When Raymond was only three, his mother negotiated the surrender of all his remaining lands and titles at the siege of Minerve on 11 June 1210. The surrender was made in the presence of Arnaud Amalric, Fulk of Toulouse, and Berengar of Barcelona and confirmed by the Council of Narbonne in January 1211. Until the formal act of the council, the overlord of the Trencavel viscounties, Peter II of Aragon, had refused to recognise Simon's takeover.

Raymond's youth after his surrender of his hereditary offices and lands was spent in the care of Raymond Roger of Foix and his successor, Roger Bernard II of Foix. In 1224, when after a general rebellion Amaury VI of Montfort ceded his rights over Raymond's former lands to the Crown, Carcassonne was reconquered by Roger Bernard and Raymond VII of Toulouse, who bestowed it (and Béziers according to one charter) on Raymond Trencavel, now of age. During the next two years as viscount, Raymond removed Guy des Vaux-de-Cernay from the diocese of Carcassonne and replaced him with Berengar Raymond, and he restored the abbot Alet, Boso, who had been deposed by a papal legation in 1222. Raymond's attitude towards the Church in the Carcassès is indicative of the Crusaders' disdain for the local clergy and the way in which the local nobility persecuted by the Crusade came to the support of the persecuted clergy. Raymond could not hold the town against King Louis VIII in 1226, however, and he was again dispossessed. His loss was less formal the second time and he continued to employ his title and act in his capacity as viscount into 1227. At that time he had achieved his majority and was even granting property to his former guardian, the count of Foix.

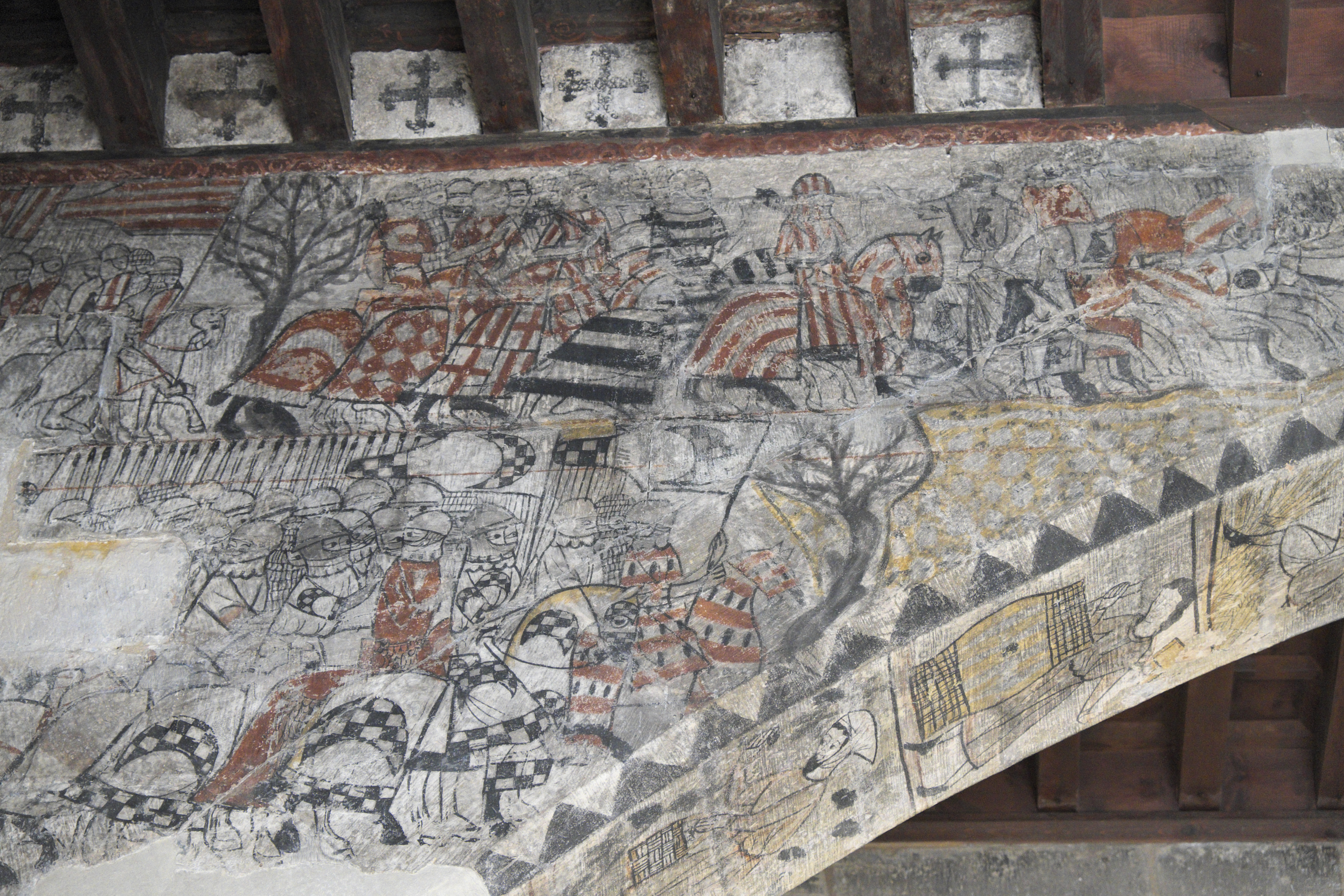
Mural depicting the conquest of Valenica, Castle of the Calatravos. Trencavel can be seen leading cavalry below, wearing gules and argent (red and white).

=== Exile ===
Raymond continued to rule Limoux as a vassal of the count of Foix until the Treaty of Paris of 12 April 1229, when all formerly Trencavel lands were surrendered to the French crown. After that he went into exile, probably to either the court of Foix, Aragon, or Catalonia. Following Gauthier Langlois, Raymond was welcomed into the court of James I of Aragon; a mural painting in Castle of the Calatravos depicts him leading an attack in the crusade against Valencia in 1238. Unlike the host of Iberian knights portrayed, here, Trencavel wears a unique enclosed helmet. Moreover, he is shown leading the banners of the De Luna family, prompting Langlois to suggest that he married into the Aragonese aristocracy south of the Pyrenees.

=== Return and Renunciation ===
In 1240 he made an attack on Carcassonne in an attempt to retake it. But though he had the help of Olivier de Termes and besieged the city from 17 September until 11 October, a royal army forced him to relent and flee to Montréal, where he was himself besieged. He escaped and went into exile again until 1247, when he finally surrendered to Louis IX and symbolically broke his vicecomital seals. Raymond was allowed to continue to rule Limoux, where he was in power as late as 1263. He left a wife and two sons, Roger and Raymond Roger, who succeeded him, but their history and that of all subsequent Trencavels is obscure in the extreme. Raymond was dead by 1267, when his son is first recorded as "of Béziers", the family name.

Throughout his life and career after his surrender in 1210, Raymond always called himself simply "Trencavel" in his own charters, a practice not thitherto common in his family. The name Trencavel had been reserved for members named Raymond and it appears that Raymond II preferred it to his given name, or desired to assert his familial connexions through its preeminence.

Coat of arms of the Trencavel family

== Sources ==
- Graham-Leigh, Elaine. The Southern French Nobility and the Albigensian Crusade. Woodbridge: The Boydell Press, 2005. ISBN 1-84383-129-5.
- Langlois, Gauthier. À Propos d’une Représentation du Vicomte Trencavel sur une Peinture Murale de la Conquête de Valence : l’Exil du Dernier Vicomte de Béziers, Albi et Carcassonne dans les états de la Couronne d’Aragon. Bulletin de la Société d'Études Scientifiques de l'Aude, 2014.
