= Acfred =

Acfred is a masculine given name of Germanic origin. It may refer to:

- Acfred, Count of Toulouse (r. 842–43)
- Acfred I of Carcassonne, count (r. 877–906)
- Acfred II of Carcassonne, count (r. 908–33)
- Acfred, Duke of Aquitaine (r. 926–27)
