= Cité de Carcassonne =

Medieval citadel of Carcassonne, France

Historic Fortified City of Carcassonne
UNESCO World Heritage Site
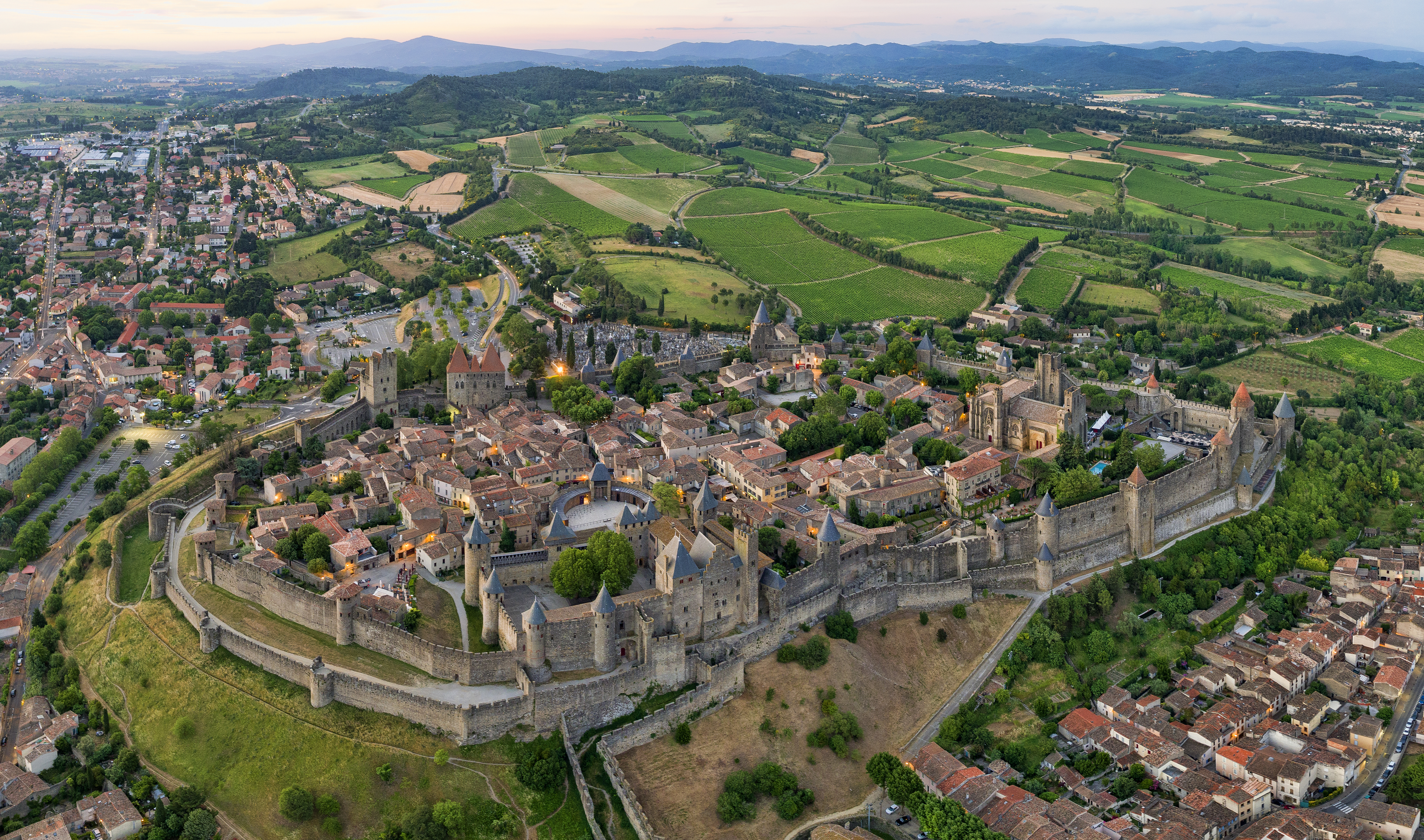
- The Cité, built in the 14th century and classified as a monument historique since 1926

- Location within Occitanie Location within France
- Location: Carcassonne, Aude, Occitanie, France
- Criteria: Cultural: (ii), (iv)
- Reference: 345rev
- Inscription: 1997 (21st Session)
- Area: 11 ha (27 acres)
- Buffer zone: 1,358 ha (3,360 acres)
- Website: http://www.remparts-carcassonne.fr/en/
- Coordinates: 43°12′24″N 2°21′50″E

The Cité de Carcassonne (Occitan: Ciutat de Carcassona [siwˈtat de kaɾkaˈsunɔ]) is a medieval citadel located in the French city of Carcassonne, in the Aude department, Occitania region. It is situated on a hill on the right bank of the river Aude, in the south-eastern part of the city proper.

The citadel was restored at the end of the 19th century by the theorist and architect Eugène Viollet-le-Duc. In 1997, it was added to the UNESCO list of World Heritage Sites because of its exceptional testimony to the architecture and planning of a medieval fortress town.

== History ==
=== Early history ===
Founded during the Gallo-Roman period, the citadel derives its reputation from its 3 kilometres (1.9 mi) long double surrounding walls interspersed by 52 towers. The town has about 2,500 years of history and has been occupied in different ages by Romans, Visigoths, and Crusaders. At the beginning of its history it was a Gaulish settlement; in the 3rd century CE, the Romans decided to transform it into a fortified town. The Roman defences were in place by 333 CE, when the town is described as a castellum. The original walls were supported by between 34 and 40 towers, spaced from 18 to 30 metres apart along the curtain wall. Each tower was semicircular in plan and about 14 metres tall. There were probably 40 main entrances to the town. The Gallo-Roman walls were rebuilt during the town's occupation by the Visigoths in the 5th and 6th centuries, but the original structure remained in place.

=== Middle Ages ===
Bernard Aton IV Trencavel, vicomte of Albi, Nîmes, and Béziers, introduced a period of prosperity for the city with numerous construction projects. During this period, a new sect known as Catharism sprang up in Languedoc. In 1096, the Viscount of Trencavel authorised the construction of the Basilica of Saint-Nazaire with the blessing of Pope Urban II. In 1107, the citizens rejected his sovereignty and called on Ramon Berenguer III, Count of Barcelona to remove him. Bernard Aton V, with the help of Bertrand, Count of Toulouse, regained control of the Cité. In 1120, there was a second revolt, but Bernard Aton re-established order a few years later. In 1130, he started construction of a palace for himself and restoration of the Gallo-Roman fortifications. The Cité of Carcassonne was surrounded by a complete fortification for the first time. At this time, the city had a large population of three to four thousand, including the residents of the two settlements below the walls of the Cité: the bourg Saint-Vincent on the north and the bourg Saint-Michel south of the Narbon gate.

In 1208, Pope Innocent III called on the barons of the north to mount a crusade against the Cathars, beginning with the Albigensian Crusade. The Count of Toulouse, accused of heresy, as well as his principal vassal, the Viscount of Trencavel, were the main target of this attack. On 1 August 1209, the Cité was besieged by the Crusaders. Raimond-Roger Trencavel surrendered quickly on 15 August in exchange for the lives of the citizens. The town around the Cité was destroyed and the citizens driven out. The vicomte died of dysentery in his own château on 10 November 1209.

His lands were given to Simon de Montfort, the leader of the crusaders. When he died in 1218 at the siege of Toulouse, his son, Amaury de Montfort, took possession of the Cité, but was unable to maintain it. He ceded it to Louis VIII of France, but Raymond VII of Toulouse and the counts of Foix allied themselves against him. In 1224, Raimond II Trencavel retook the Cité. However, Louis VIII launched another crusade in 1226. From that time forth, the Cité became a royal domain.

After 1226, an additional line of fortifications was added outside of the Roman walls. The town was finally annexed to the Kingdom of France in 1247. It provided a strong French frontier between France and the Crown of Aragon. During this period, the inner Roman walls were largely demolished and replaced, while the new outer walls were reinforced and extended to the south. The new towers built during this work were mainly circular, but two were square. Construction continued into the reign of King Philip IV in the early 14th century.

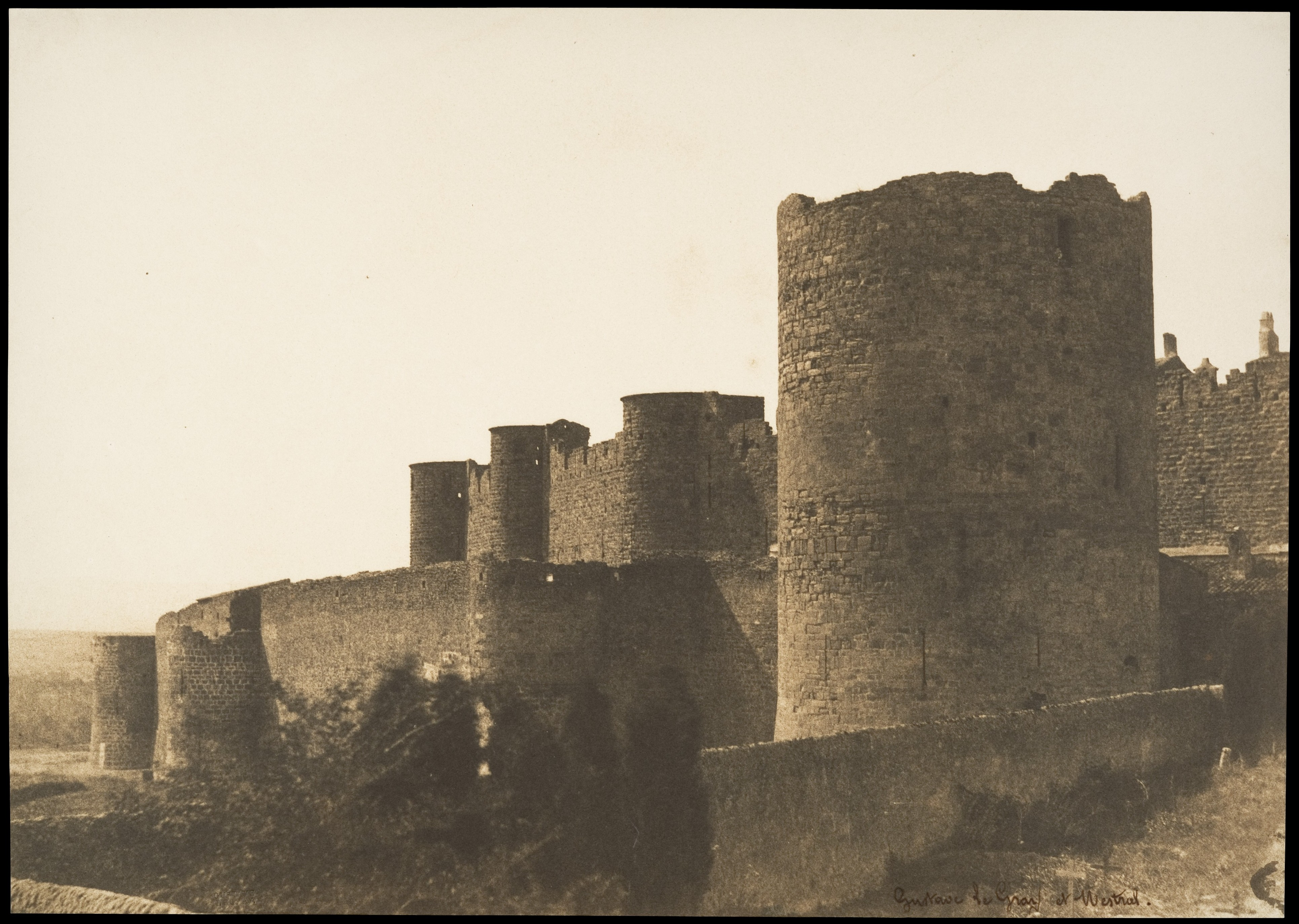
View of the ramparts in 1851, prior to their restoration

In 1659, after the Treaty of the Pyrenees, the province of Roussillon became a part of France and the town lost its military significance. Fortifications were abandoned and the town became one of the economic centres of France, concentrating on the woolen textile industry. In November 1793, the Revolutionary town council burned the Cité's archives and in 1804 Napoleon officially demilitarized the fortress, turning over ownership of most of the fortifications to civil authorities.

=== Restoration ===
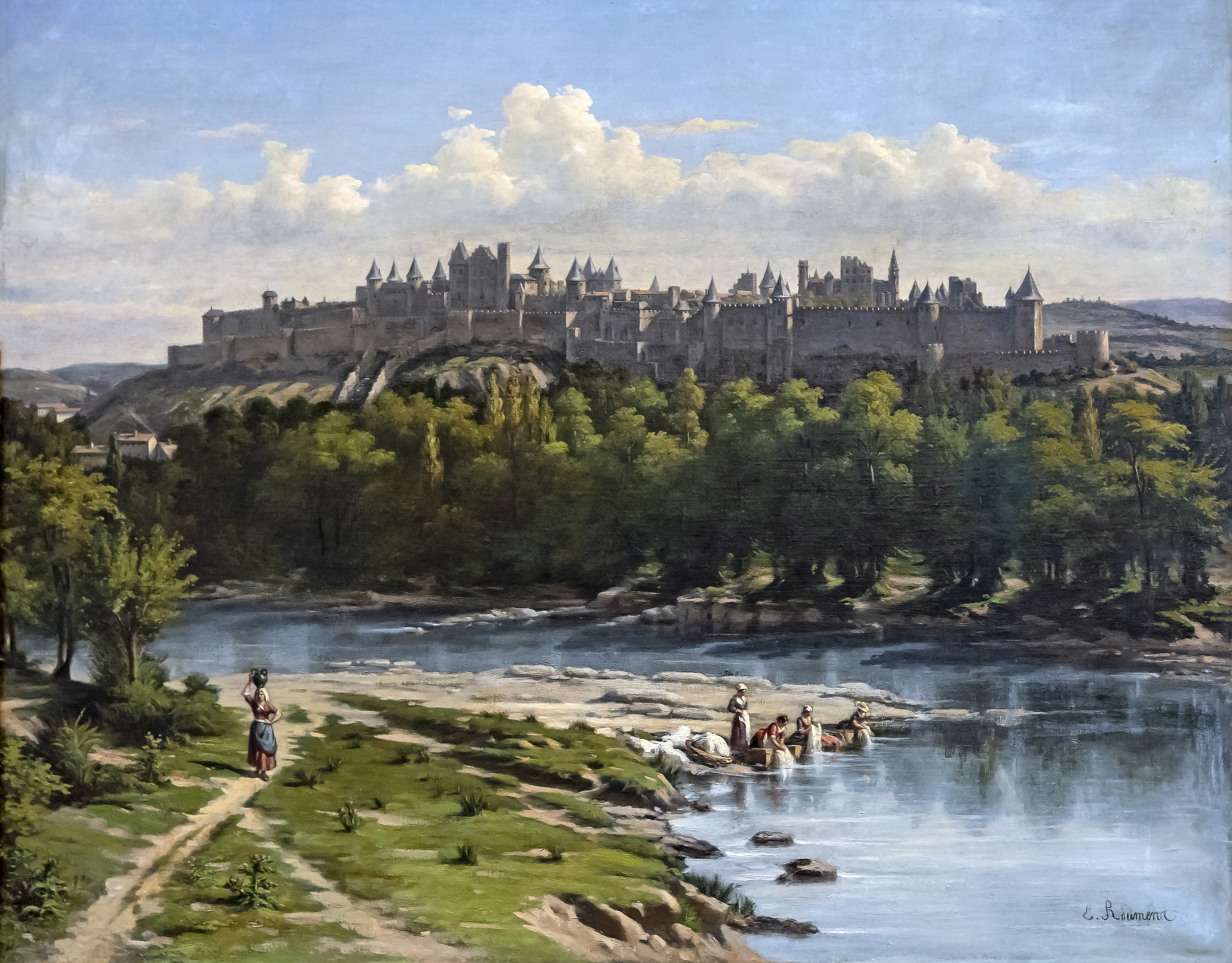
The restored city, painted c. 1900 by Émile Roumens

In 1849, the Government of France decided that the city fortifications should be demolished. This decision was strongly opposed by the local people. Jean-Pierre Cros-Mayrevieille and literary personality Prosper Mérimée, both noted archaeologists and historians, led a campaign to preserve the fortress as a historical monument. The government later reversed its decision and in 1853 restoration work began. The architect Eugène Viollet-le-Duc was charged with renovating the fortress. Viollet-le-Duc's work was criticised during his lifetime as inappropriate to the climate and traditions of the region, for example by adding slate roofs appropriate to northern France rather than terracotta tiles. After his death in 1879, the restoration work was continued by his pupil, Paul Boeswillwald, and later by the architect Nodet. An image of the historic city of Carcassonne appears on the emblem of local rugby league team, AS Carcassonne.

== Panorama ==
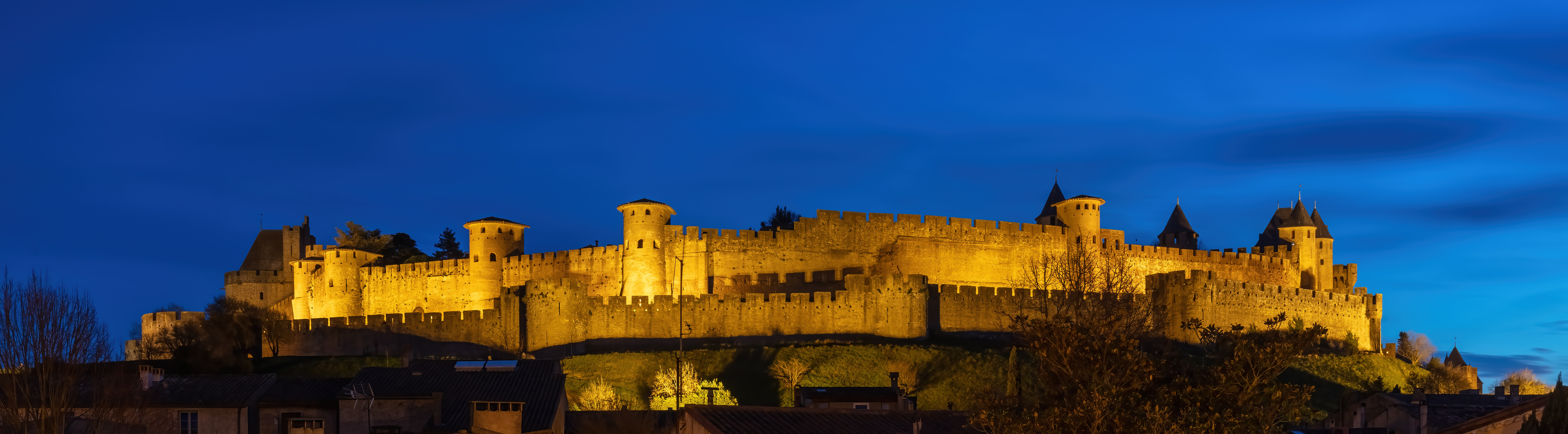
Night view

== Places of interest ==
=== Chateau Comtal ===
Situated in the Cité de Carcassonne, the Chateau Comtal was the fortress that housed the Viscounts of Carcassonne. Built at the beginning of the 12th century, it underwent several later modifications. From 1240 to 1250, major work was carried out to strengthen the walls, incorporating more round towers, the barbican advanced to the entrance gate and the moat.

== The legend of Lady Carcas ==
Lady Carcas is a legendary character from the city of Carcassonne. According to the legend, she is the wife of Ballak, the Muslim prince of Carcassonne, who was killed in action against Charlemagne. Lady Carcas, following the death of her husband, allegedly took charge of the city's defence against the Frankish army and repelled it. Princess Carcas first used a trick consisting of making fake soldiers, which she had manufactured and placed in each tower of the city. The siege lasted five years.

But by the beginning of the sixth year, food and water were becoming increasingly scarce. Lady Carcas wanted to make an inventory of all the reserves left. The city was Saracen, so a part of the population, being Muslim, did not consume pork. The villagers brought her a pig and a bag of wheat. She then had the idea of feeding the pig with the sack of wheat and then pushing it from the highest tower of the city at the foot of the outer ramparts.

Charlemagne and his men, believing that the city was still overflowing with soldiers and food to the point of wasting a wheat-fed pig, ended the siege. Seeing Charlemagne's army leaving the plain in front of the city, Lady Carcas was filled with joy at the victory of her ploy and decided to ring all the city's bells. One of Charlemagne's men then shouted: "Carcas is ringing!", in French "Carcas sonne!" thus creating the name of the city.
