= Raymond I Trencavel =

Occitan noble (died 1167)

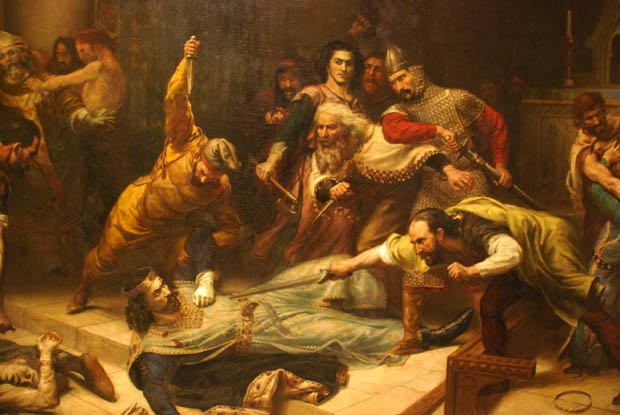
The murder of Raymond Trencavel.jpg

Raymond I Trencavel (also Raimond) (died 1167) was the Viscount of Agde and Béziers from 1130 and Viscount of Albi, Carcassonne, and Razès from 1150. He was a member of the Trencavel family, ruling the lands of the elder branch.

He was the second son of Bernard Ato IV and Cecilia of Provence. When his father died in 1129, he redistributed his six viscounties among his three sons. The eldest, Roger I, received Carcassonne, Albi, and Razès; Raymond received Béziers and Agde; while the youngest, Bernard Ato V, received Nîmes. In 1132 Roger and Raymond agreed that in the event of Roger's death without heirs, Carcassonne would pass to Raymond. In 1150 Roger died and his three viscounties all passed to Raymond. After a series of disputes, the viscounty of Agde was divided between Raymond and Bernard Ato, with the latter holding the title.

In November of the same year that he inherited his brother's viscounties, Raymond made a treaty with Raymond Berengar IV, Count of Barcelona whereby he swore fealty to the count of Barcelona and agreed to hold Carcassonne, Razès, and Lautrec from the count as a vassal. The 16th-century historian Gerónimo Zurita wrote in the Anales de la Corona de Aragón ("Annals of the Crown of Aragon") that Raymond Berengar IV marched an army to Narbonne to intimidate Raymond to submit, but there is no primary contemporaneous source which verifies this. However, Raymond Berengar IV had been at Arles in September to negotiate a truce with Raymond des Baux to put an end to the Baussenque Wars and was probably accompanied by an armed host, so it is at least probable that he had an army present in the region at the time when he made the treaty with Raymond. In 1151 Raymond made a mutual defence treaty with Ermengard of Narbonne, but he included a clause which prohibited him from being required to wage war on Toulouse. That Raymond was still trying to maintain his rapidly disintegrating alliance with Toulouse following his submission to Barcelona may imply that his submission had not been voluntary. In 1152 Raymond acquired Mèze in a purchase from his nephew Gerald de Roussillon. In 1158 the agreement with Raymond Berengar was renewed.

Throughout his career Raymond had very good relations with Alfonso Jordan, Count of Toulouse, and accompanied him on the Second Crusade in 1147. He remained with Alfonso until the latter died in 1148. After his return to Europe, however, relations with Toulouse went sour—possibly concerning Raymond's sworn allegiance to Barcelona—and he quarrelled with Alfonso's son Raymond V, who imprisoned him in 1153. He was released only on the payment of a ransom of 3,000 marks in 1154. Though William of Newburgh states that Raymond was deprived of his lands by the count of Toulouse, charter evidence from 1155 to 1157 indicates that he lost no major possession. Out of hatred for the count of Toulouse, Raymond participated in Henry II of England's expedition against Toulouse in 1159. By 1163 he had made peace with Toulouse and the count had reimbursed him for the ransom of 1153.

In 1131, at the very onset of his reign, Raymond was confronted with the formation of a consulate, a political office then becoming popular in the cities of southern France. Consuls were usually high-ranking citizens, but they could also be noblemen or courtiers. Towards the end of his reign Raymond seems to have supported the nobles against the citizens and this got him murdered in the cathedral of Béziers in 1167. While he was campaigning with his nephew Bernard Ato VI against Raymond of Toulouse, he was forced to mediate between a knight and a citizen and, choosing in favour of the knight, he punished the citizen (apparently moderately). Nonetheless, there was outrage among the citizenry and Raymond arranged a meeting in Béziers. The bourgeoisie arrived secretly armed and, on a signal, assaulted and killed the viscount. By his wife Saure, Raymond left a son and successor, Roger II, who inherited all his viscounties, but was unable to occupy Béziers until 1168, despite a siege led by Alfonso II of Aragon on his behalf in 1167. Roger punished the citizens of Béziers by permitting the Aragonese troops to enter the city and kill them.

Raymond's death possibly forms the subject matter of the poem A People Grieving for the Death of their Lord by Guillem Augier Novella. His death is recorded by such diverse chroniclers as William of Newburgh, Robert of Torigny, Gaufred de Vigeois, and Peter of Vaux-de-Cernay. The chronicle of Newburgh, however, refers to Raymond as "Guillem" and can thus not be counted as completely reliable, though the details surrounding his death are largely corroborated. Vaux-de-Cernay, on the other hand, describes the massacre of 7,000 citizens of Béziers by the Albigensian Crusade in 1209 as divine justice on the city for the treachery shown to their lord and their bishop, who had had his teeth knocked out trying to defend Raymond from attack.

== Sources ==
- Fredric L. Cheyette, Ermengard of Narbonne and the World of the Troubadours, Cornell University Press, 2001.
- Graham-Leigh, Elaine. The Southern French Nobility and the Albigensian Crusade, The Boydell Press, 2005. ISBN 1-84383-129-5.
