= Constance of France =

Constance of France may refer to:

- Constance of France, Princess of Antioch (1078–1125), daughter of Philip I of France
- Constance of France, Countess of Toulouse (1124–1176), daughter of Louis VI of France
