= Giraut de Salignac =

French troubadour

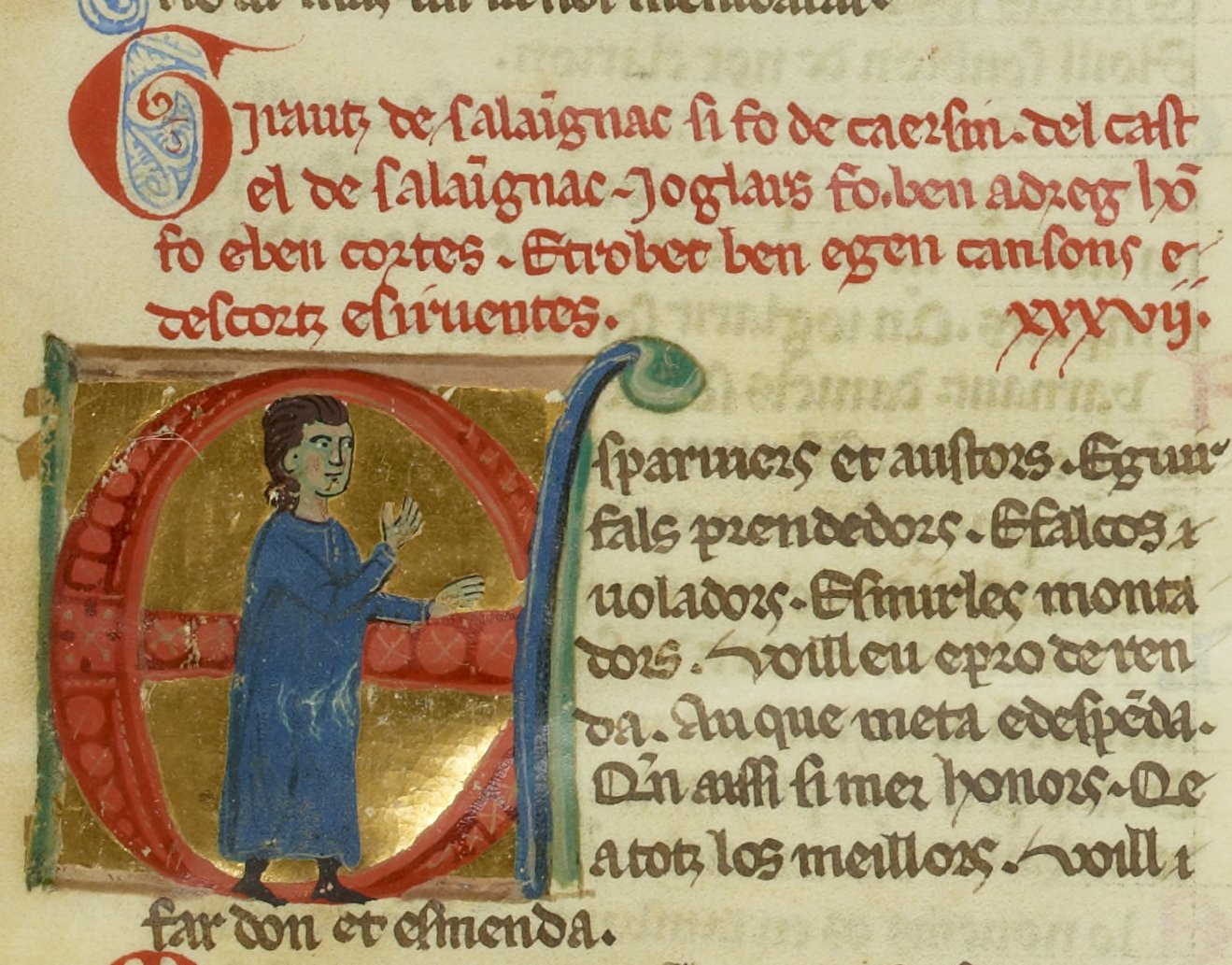
Giraut de Salignac

Giraut (or Guiraut) de Salignac (or Salinhac) was a jongleur and troubadour from the Quercy. His castle was Salignac. According to his vida he composed cansos, sirventes, and descortz, though only one canso and one descort survive. His composition were characterised, so his biographer says, by "grace and skill". He may have written under the patronage of Azalais of Toulouse, whom he mentions in his poetry. His name is sometimes erroneously given as Guilhem.

== Sources ==
- Egan, Margarita, ed. The Vidas of the Troubadours. New York: Garland, 1984. ISBN 0-8240-9437-9.
