= Azalais of Toulouse =

French noblewoman

Coat of Arms of the vicountcy of Béziers.

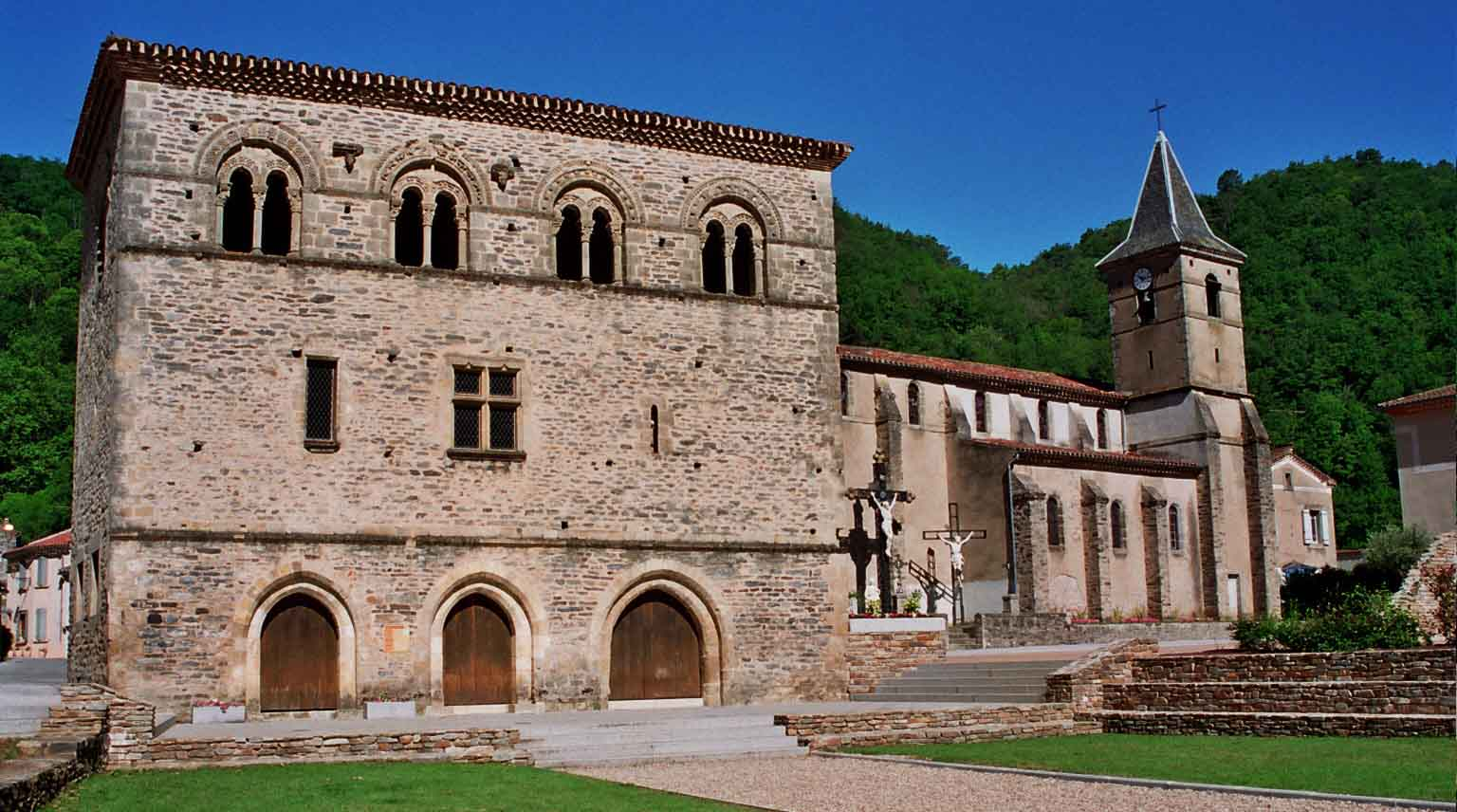
Adelaide's Pavilion in Burlats

Azalaís of Toulouse (or Alaís) was the daughter of count Raymond V of Toulouse and Constance of France.

She was born at the castle of Burlats (canton of Roquecourbe, Tarn) and is therefore called contessa de Burlatz (Countess of Burlats) in the vida of Arnaut de Mareuil.

She was married to Roger II Trencavel, count of Béziers and Carcassonne, in 1171; she was the mother of Raymond Roger Trencavel, who died in captivity after the siege of Carcassonne in 1209. Azalais herself died in 1199.

Azalais of Toulouse is named in the poems of several troubadours, including Pons de la Gardia, Giraut de Salignac. It is said that the poems of Arnaut de Mareuil form a sequence telling of his love for her. Alfonso II of Aragon was his rival, and according to the razó to one of Arnaut's poems, the king jealously persuaded her to break off her friendship with Arnaut. Alfonso's own dealings with Azalais were fiercely criticized in a sirventès by Guillem de Berguedà: "she gave you her love, and you took two cities and a hundred castles from her".
