= Garsende of Béziers =

Garsende of Béziers (died 1034), was the ruling suo jure Viscount of Béziers and Agde in 994–1034. In 990, she married Raymonde, son of the Viscount of Carcassonne.
