= Roger I Trencavel =

Roger I Trencavel, (Roger I of Beziers), (died 1150) was the eldest son of Bernard Ato IV, Viscount of Albi, Agde, Béziers, Carcassonne, Nîmes, and Razès. On his father's death in 1130 he inherited Albi, Carcassonne, and Razès, while his younger brother Raymond inherited Agde and Béziers and his youngest brother Bernard Ato V inherited Nîmes.

Beginning in Carcassonne in 1141, Roger was the first Trencavel ruler to appoint vicars to go about the vicecomital business at the local level. He appointed vicars both from within his court and without the regions which they were supposed to administer. It is clear, however, that Trencavel government was still rather primitive in Roger I's time.

Roger I was a notable benefactor of the Order of the Temple and a fervent Crusader, making large grants to the first Templar preceptory in Occitania at Douzens. He made a grant to the Temple in 1133 of the village of Brucafel "that Omnipotent God in his mercy should make us and our posterity live in good perseverance, and that after the course of this life should deign to receive us in a good end." In July 1147 Roger endeavoured to join the Second Crusade and so granted to the preceptory of Douzens the village of Campagne-sur-Aude with all jurisdiction in return for their taking up the mortgage of 3,000 solidi of Urgell on the land. Roger also exempted the Templars from taxes, such as the usaticum, on all his lands. He left from Agde on the Crusade after being released from the encumbrance of his mortgage later in 1147.

== Marriages ==
Roger married Alazais of Pons and Saintonge. They had no children. Roger remarried in 1139 to Bernarda of Comminges, but he died childless in 1150. He was succeeded in Carcassonne, in accordance with an agreement of 1132, by his brother Raymond. Albi and Razès also went to Raymond, while Bernard Ato squabbled over Agde, which was eventually split between the surviving brothers.

== Sources ==
- Barber, Malcolm (2005). "The Templar Preceptory of Douzens (Aude) in the Twelfth Century". In Bull, Marcus Graham; Léglu, Catherine (eds.). The World of Eleanor of Aquitaine: Literature and Society in Southern France between the Eleventh and Thirteenth Centuries. The Boydell Press. ISBN 1-84383-114-7.
- Graham-Leigh, Elaine (2005). The Southern French Nobility and the Albigensian Crusade. The Boydell Press. ISBN 1-84383-129-5.
- Pegg, Mark Gregory (2008). A Most Holy War: The Albigensian Crusade and the Battle for Christendom. Oxford University Press.
- Riley-Smith, Jonathan (1997). The First Crusaders, 1095-1131. Cambridge University Press.
