= Ermengarde of Carcassonne =

Ermengarde (died 1099) was the ruling viscountess of Carcassonne from 1067 to 1099. She was the daughter of Pierre Raymond of Carcassonne and Rangarde de la Marche.

Ermengarde married Raymond Bernard, with whom she had a son Bernard Ato IV. After the death of her brother, Roger III of Carcassonne, in 1067, the succession of the county was disputed between Ermengarde and Roger II de Foix. The fight lasted for many years, because the successive suzerains, the counts Ramon Berenguer I, then Ramon Berenguer II and Ramon Berenguer III also had sights on the city and tried on several occasions to seize Carcassonne. Ermengarde was not recognized viscountess until 1082, and shared the government with her son Bernard Ato.

== Sources ==
- Cheyette, Fredric L. (2001). Ermengard of Narbonne and the World of the Troubadours. Ithaca: Cornell University Press. ISBN 9781501722554.
