= Burlats =

- Commune
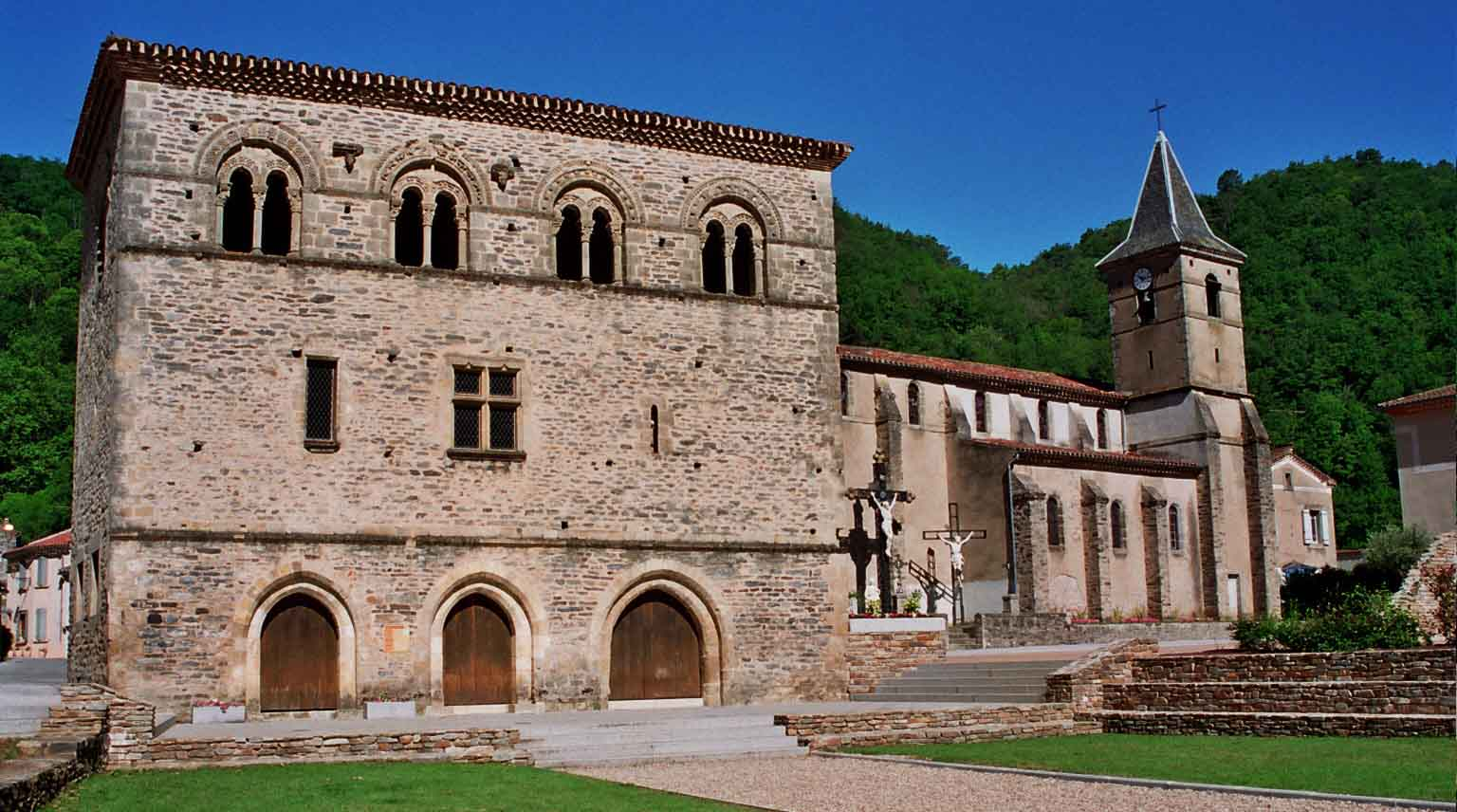
- The Adelaide Pavilion in Burlats

- Coat of arms
- Location of Burlats
- Location within France Location within Occitanie
- Coordinates: 43°38′15″N 2°19′06″E
- Country: France
- Region: Occitania
- Department: Tarn
- Arrondissement: Castres
- Canton: Castres-2

Government
  - Mayor (2020–2026): Serge Sérieys
- Area^{1}: 32.62 km^{2} (12.59 sq mi)
- Elevation: 195 m (640 ft)
- Highest elevation: 682 m (2,238 ft)
- Lowest elevation: 176 m (577 ft)
- Population (2023): 1,998
  - Density: 61.25/km^{2} (158.6/sq mi)
- Time zone: UTC+01:00 (CET)
  - Summer (DST): UTC+02:00 (CEST)
- INSEE/Postal code: 81042 /81100
- ^{1} French Land Register data, which excludes lakes, ponds, glaciers > 1 km^{2} (0.386 sq mi or 247 acres) and river estuaries.

Burlats (French pronunciation: [byʁlats]) is a commune in the Tarn department and Occitanie region of southern France.

== Population ==
Historical population
| Year | Pop. | ±% p.a. |
|---|---|---|
| 1968 | 1,141 | — |
| 1975 | 1,176 | +0.43% |
| 1982 | 1,313 | +1.59% |
| 1990 | 1,670 | +3.05% |
| 1999 | 1,829 | +1.02% |
| 2007 | 1,879 | +0.34% |
| 2012 | 1,935 | +0.59% |
| 2017 | 2,131 | +1.95% |
| 2023 | 1,998 | −1.07% |
Source: INSEE

== Notable monuments ==
- The Adelaide Pavilion, a unique showcase of Romanesque civil architecture that cradled the birth of l’Amour courtois (“courtly love”, a medieval European conception of love in its noble, chivalrous ways). Dame Adelaide de Toulouse was the daughter of Raymond V, count of Toulouse, viscountess of Albi, who married Roger II Trencavel in 1171.
- The House of Adam, a 12th-century house famous for its façade on the river Agout that possibly depended from the priory. Its name came from a window lintel that was sold in 1935.
- The former St-Pierre collegiate church. The priory was mentioned for the first time in 973, then in a bull from pope Calixtus II, as dependant from the Castres Abbey. When the latter became a cathedral in 1317, the priory was secularised and became a collegiate in 1318. After several destructions, due notably to the Wars of Religion and a fire in 1625, the church's ruins are eventually bought by the commune in 1835 to be restored. It was designated a “Monument Historique” in 1845.
- The Bistoure gate, one of the four gates of the ramparts, dating back to the 14th century.
- The 17th-century castle, with its ancient 14th-century tower.

== See also ==
- Communes of the Tarn department
- Tourism in Tarn
