= Arsinde =

Tenth-century noblewoman and ruler

Arsinde de Carcassonne
- Born: c. 920
- Died: 970
- Spouse: Arnaud de Comminges
- Children: Roger I of Carcassonne
- Parent: Acfred de Carcassone (father)

Arsinde of Carcassonne (c. 920 – 970) was a tenth-century countess and ruler of Carcassonne in West Francia.

== Biography ==
Arsinde de Carcassonne was born c. 920 to Acfred de Carcassonne. Her father was head of the ruling house of Carcassonne and had no surviving sons. When he died in 934 the title and land was given to his daughter.

She married Arnaud de Comminges, a local nobleman with whom she had at least four children. Arsinde ruled for twenty-three years before she died, leaving her titles to her son Roger.

== Issue ==
- Adélaïde de Comminges
- Roger I of Carcassonne
- Odon I of Razes
- Arsinde de Carcassonne
