= Bernard Ato IV =

Viscount of Nîmes (died 1129)

Bernard Ato IV, Viscount of Nimes
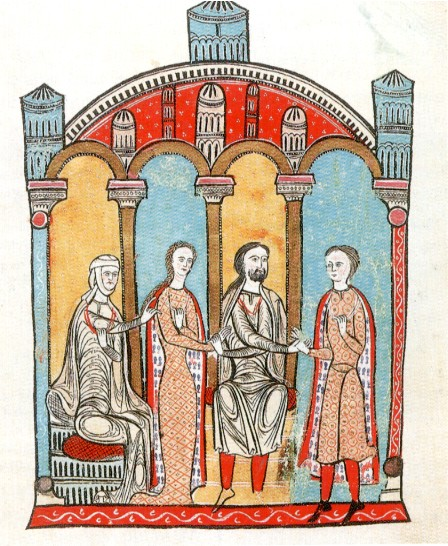
- Bernard Ato's daughter, Ermengard, standing between her mother and her father, is being betrothed to Gausfred III of Roussillon.
- Died: 1129
- Noble family: Trencavel
- Spouse: Cecilia of Provence
- Issue: Bernard Ato V Roger I Trencavel; Raymond I Trencavel; Ermengard
- Father: Raymond Bernard of Nîmes
- Mother: Ermengarde de Carcassonne

Bernard Ato IV (died 1129) was the viscount of Nîmes of the Trencavel family from 1074 to his death. Bernard Ato was the son of Raymond Bernard of Nîmes (died 1074) and Ermengarde of Carcassonne.

In 1096, Bernard joined the army of Raymond of Saint-Gilles to fight in the First Crusade. After returning from the Holy Land, Bernard retook Carcassonne in 1125.

He married Cecilia of Provence, daughter of Bertrand II of Provence, and had:

- Bernard Ato V
- Roger I
- Raymond I Trencavel
- Ermengard married Gausfred III of Roussillon.

== Sources ==
- Cheyette, Fredric L. (2001). Ermengard of Narbonne and the World of the Troubadours. Cornell University Press.
- Pegg, Mark Gregory (2008). A Most Holy War: The Albigensian Crusade and the Battle for Christendom. Oxford University Press.
- Riley-Smith, Jonathan (1997). The First Crusaders, 1095-1131. Cambridge University Press.
