= Bernard Ato V =

Viscount of Nîmes
- Reign: 1129 - 1163
- Predecessor: Bernard Ato IV
- Successor: Bernard Ato VI
- Died: 1163
- Issue: Bernard Ato VI
- House: Trencavel
- Father: Bernard Ato IV
- Mother: Cecilia of Provence

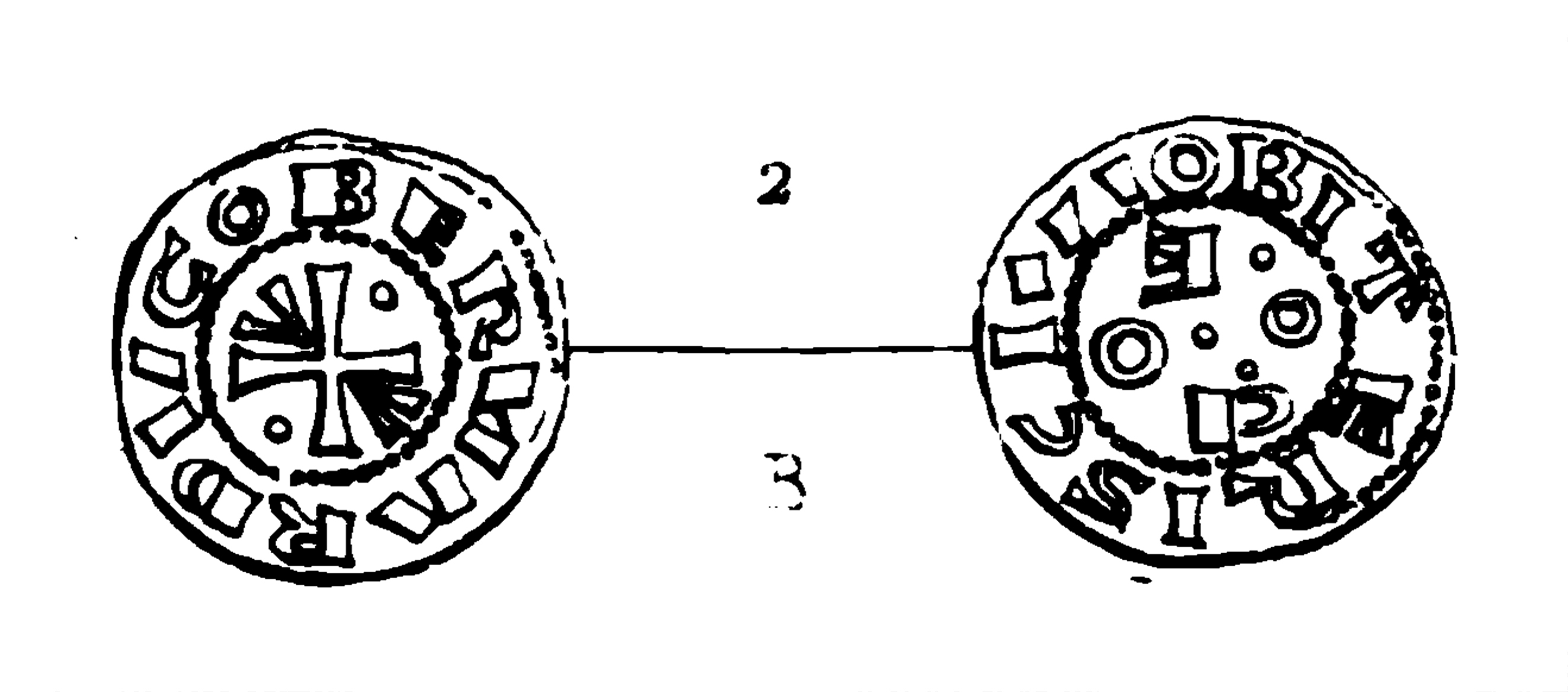
Coin of Bernard Ato V Trencavel, viscount of Nîmes and Agde

Bernard Ato V (died 1163) was the Viscount of Nîmes of the Trencavel family from 1129 to his death. He was then succeeded by his son and successor Bernard Ato VI.

Bernard was the son of Bernard Ato V Trencavel, viscount of Nimes, and Cecilia of Provence. In 1138, he swore an oath of fidelity to Alfonso Jordan, Count of Toulouse, along with his brothers Roger of Carcassonne and Raymond of Béziers. Nevertheless, because his father Bernard Ato IV had supported William IX of Aquitaine in his attempt to take Toulouse and because his lands controlled the roads between Alfonso's Languedocian and Provençal lands, Bernard Ato and Alfonso were fundamentally at odds. Alfonso even seized some castles in the vicinity of Nîmes itself.

== Sources ==
- Cheyette, Fredric L. (2001). Ermengard of Narbonne and the World of the Troubadours. Ithaca: Cornell University Press. ISBN 9781501722554.
