= Roger IV =

Roger IV may refer to:

- Roger IV, Duke of Apulia (1152–1161)
- Roger IV of Foix (died 1265), Count of Foix
