= Roger III =

Roger III may refer to:

- Roger III, Duke of Apulia (1118–1148)
- Roger III of Sicily (1175–1193), King of Sicily
