= Acfred II of Carcassonne =

Acfred II (sometimes Alfred) (died 933) was the co-governor of the County of Carcassonne and Razès from 906 to 908 and then count in his own right until his death. He was the younger son of Oliba II of Carcassonne and he cogoverned his inheritance with his elder brother Bencion I of Carcassonne. He has been identified with Acfred, Duke of Aquitaine, but this identification is now considered unlikely.

It is unknown if he was ever married and if he left any descendants. He was succeeded by Arsenda, either his daughter or a daughter of Acfred I or of Acfred of Aquitaine.

Preceded by Bencion I	Count of Razès; 908–933	Succeeded by Arsenda
Preceded by Bencion I	Count of Carcassonne; 908–933	Succeeded by Arsenda
