= Roger I of Carcassonne =

- Died: 1012
- Noble family: House of Comminges
- Spouse: Adelaide of Rouergue
- Issue Detail: Bernard-Roger, Count of Bigorre; Ermesinde of Carcassonne
- Father: Arnaud I of Comminges
- Mother: Arsinde of Carcassonne

Roger I (died 1012) was the count of Carcassonne from c. 1000 and count of Comminges (from 957) and Couserans (from 983).

== Life ==
Roger was the son of Arnaud I of Comminges and Arsinde of Carcassonne. Associated with the government of Comminges in 957, he inherited the county of Couserans in 983 at the death of his father, Count Arnaud I. At around 1000 he inherited the county of Carcassonne from his mother.

After sharing the government with his son Ramon Roger in Carcassonne, part of the county of Couserans and of the county of Razès and Bernard I Roger in Couserans, he was succeeded by his nephew William I of Carcassonne.

== Marriage and issue ==
In 969 Roger married Adelaide of Rouergue. They had:

- Ramon Roger
- Bernard-Roger, Count of Bigorre
- Peter Roger, Bishop of Girona from 1010-1050
- Ermesinde married Ramon Borrell, count of Barcelona.

== Sources ==
- Cheyette, Fredric L. (2001). Ermengard of Narbonne and the World of the Troubadours. Cornell University Press. ISBN 9780801439520.
- Ourliac, Paul; Magnou, Anne-Marie, eds. (1984). Cartulaire de l'abbaye de Lézat. Série 8 (in French). Vol. 17. Acheve d'imprimer sur les presses de l'imprimerie Darantiere.
- Wood, Susan (2006). The Proprietary Church in the Medieval West. Oxford University Press.
