= Castle of the Calatravos =

Castle in Alcañiz, Aragon, Spain

Coordinates: 41.0484°N 0.1327°W

- Castillo de los Calatravos
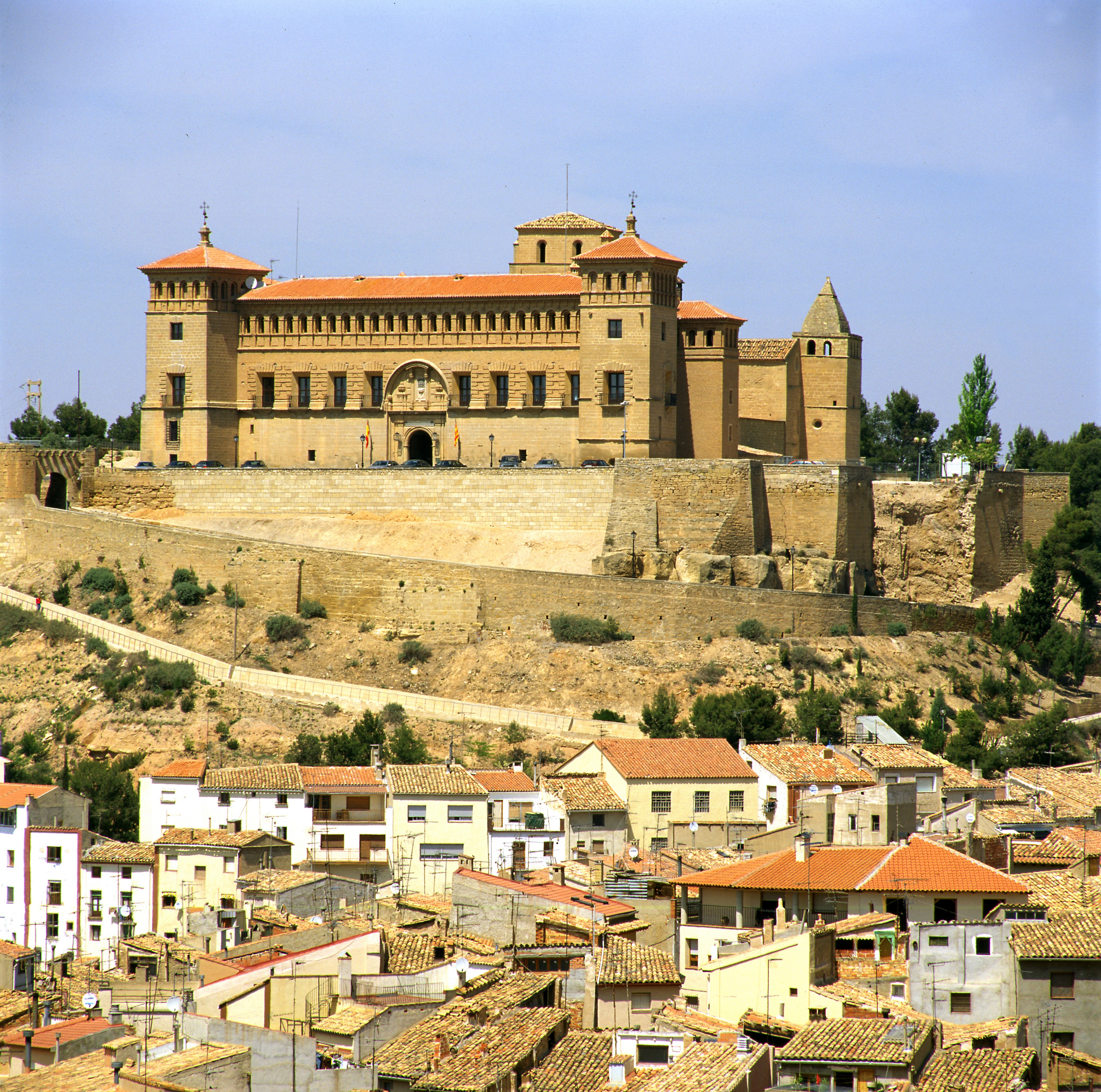
- Interactive map of the Castle of the Calatravos area
- Alternative names: Parador de Alcañiz
- Hotel chain: Paradores

General information
- Status: Active
- Type: Castle
- Location: Alcañiz (Teruel), Spain

Website
- Parador de Alcañiz

Spanish Cultural Heritage
- Official name: Castillo Interior o Alcázar
- Type: Non-movable
- Criteria: Monument
- Designated: 25 June 1925
- Reference no.: RI-51-0000312

The Castle of the Calatravos is a castle in Alcañiz (Teruel), Spain, that belonged to the Order of Calatrava. This military order played an important role in the reconquest of the town in 1157; the oldest rooms in the building date back to the twelfth and thirteenth centuries. During the fourteenth and fifteenth centuries, elements of Mudéjar ornamentation were added both to the castle itself and to the walls that surrounded it. The late-Renaissance main façade was added in the eighteenth century. Since 1968 it houses a Parador hotel designed by the Spanish architect José Luis Picardo.

== Gallery ==
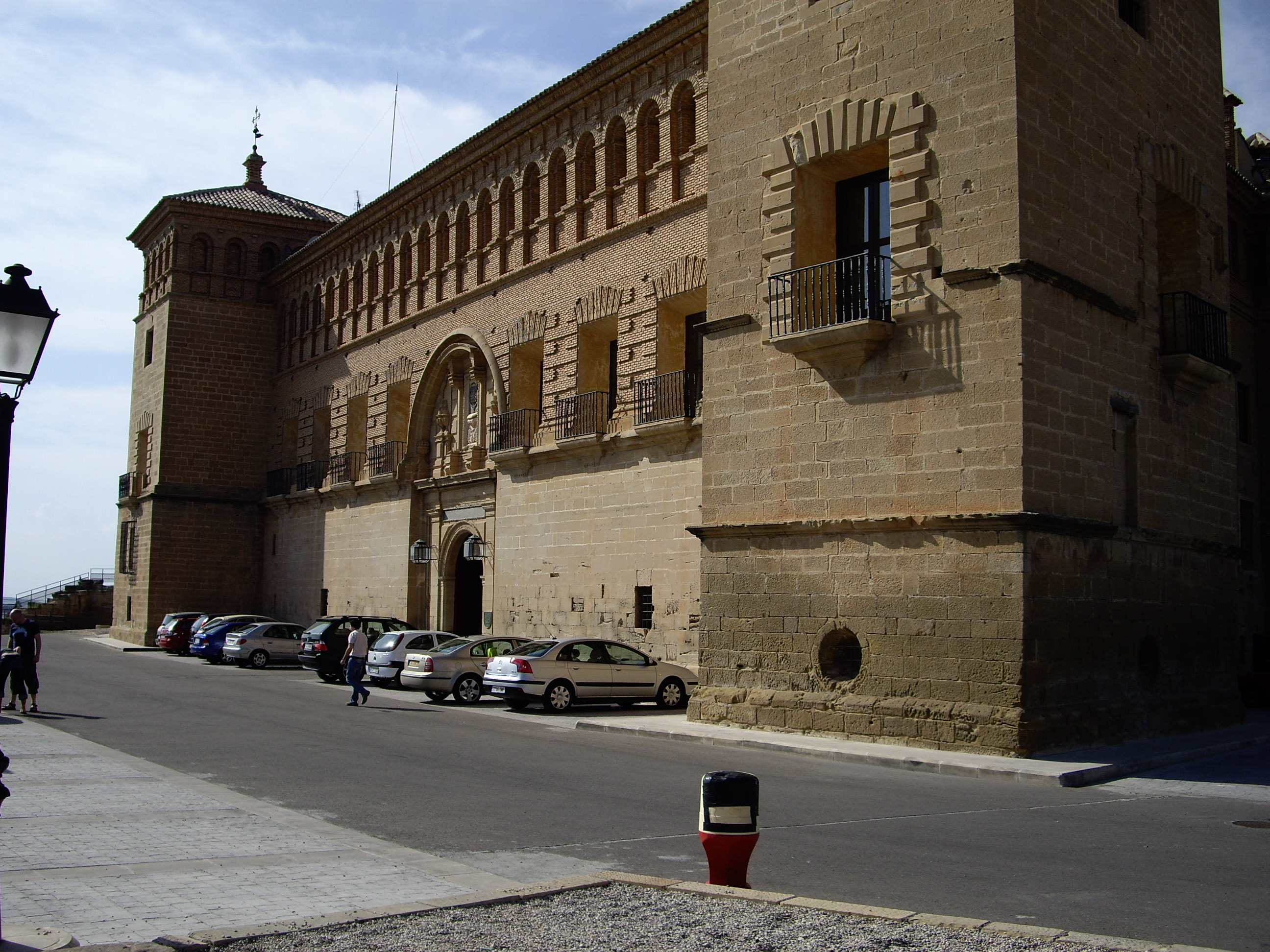
Palacio de los Comendadores façade.

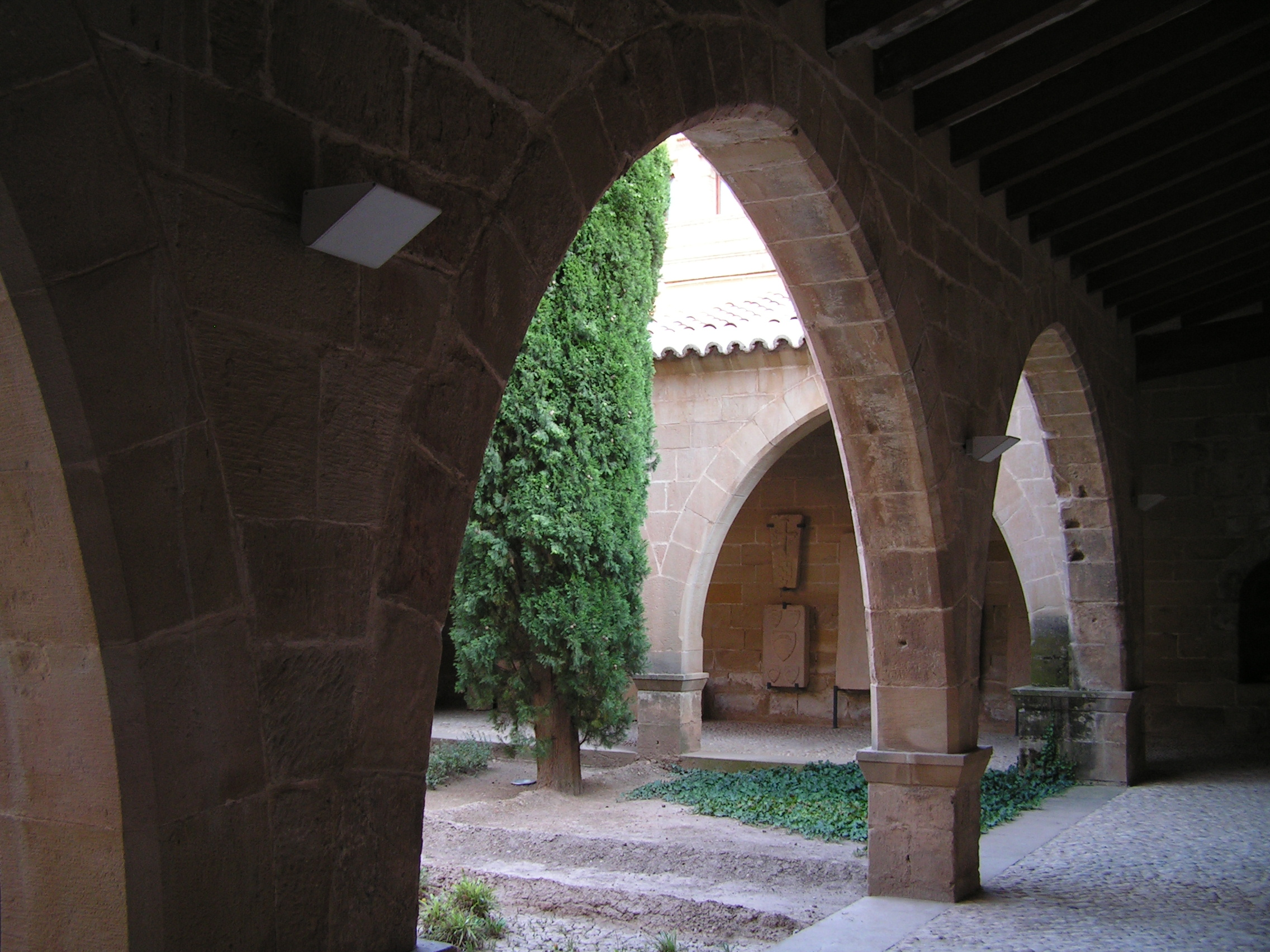
Cloister.

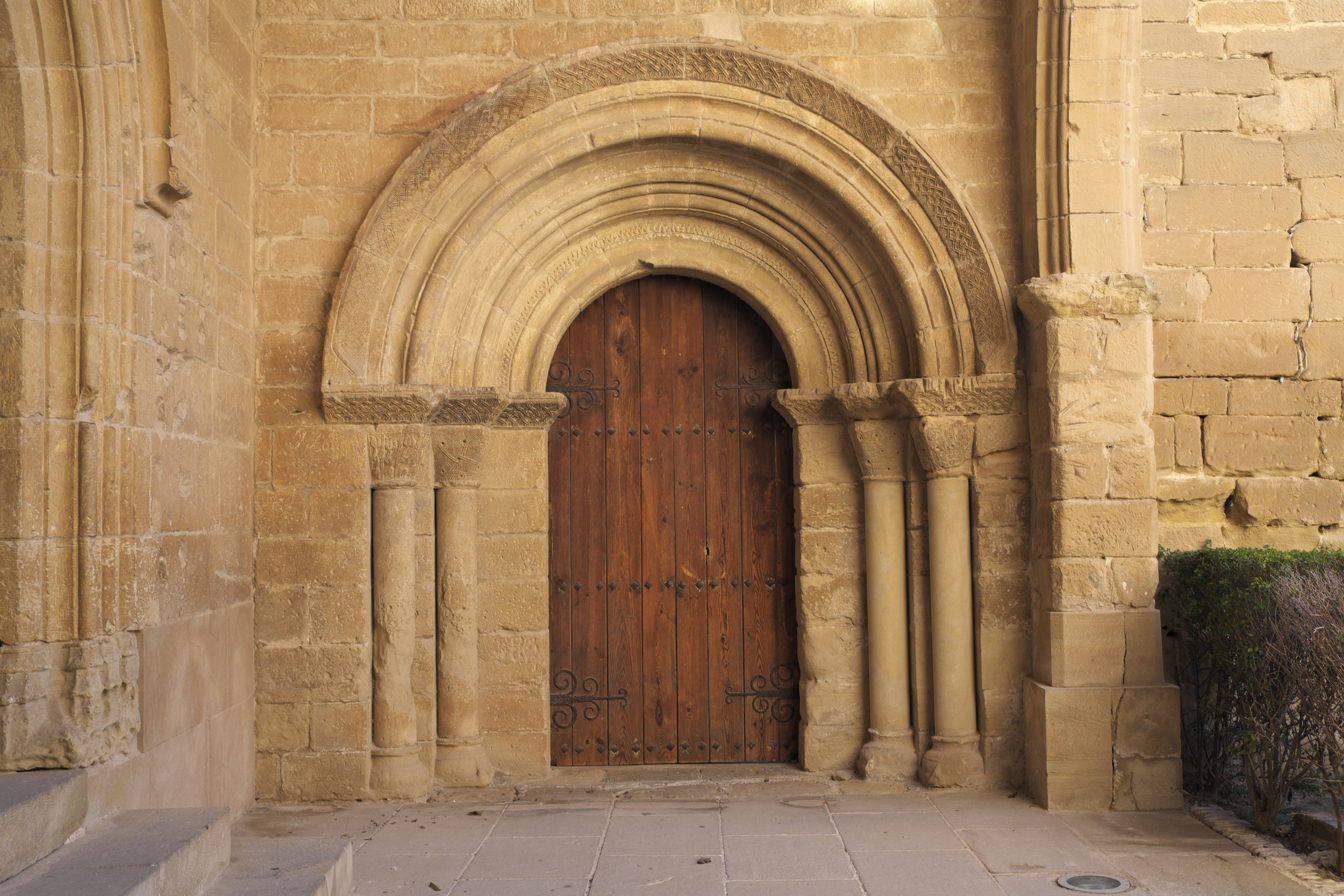
Romanesque entrance.

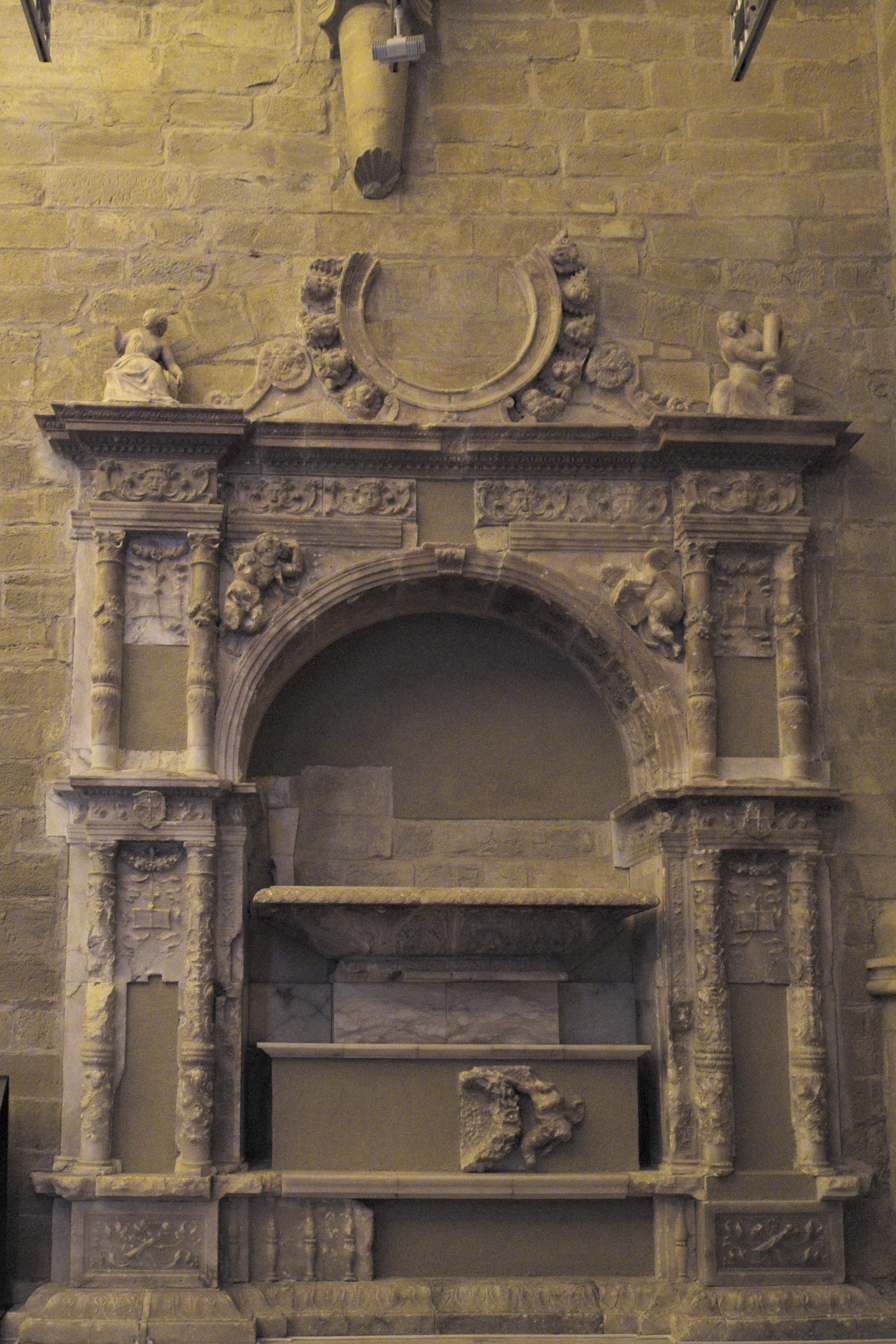
Juan de Lanuza tomb.

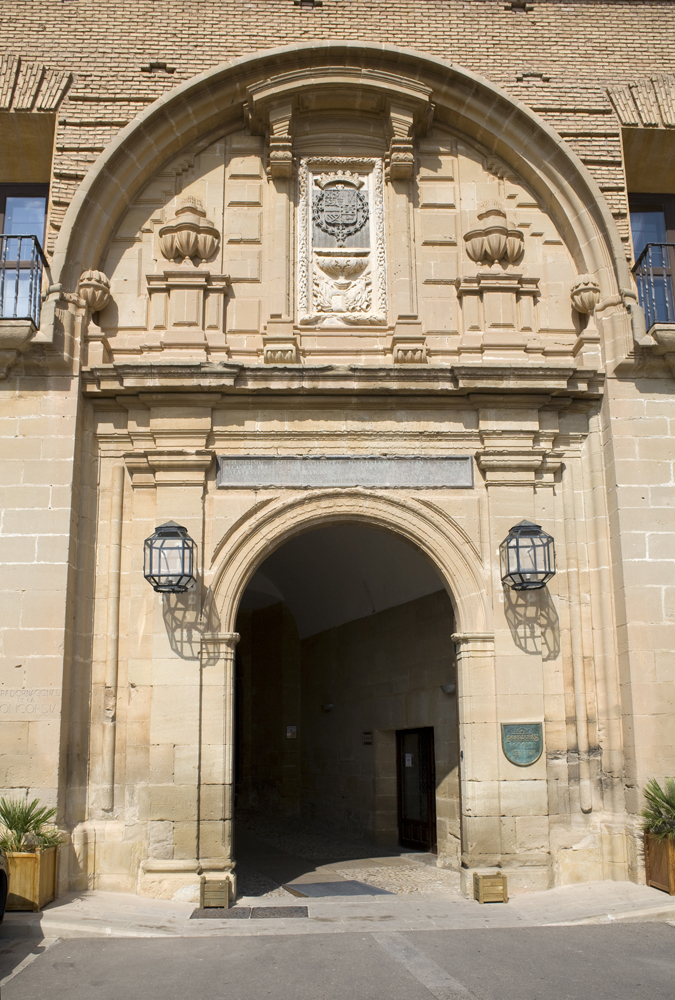
Palacio de los Comendadores entrance.

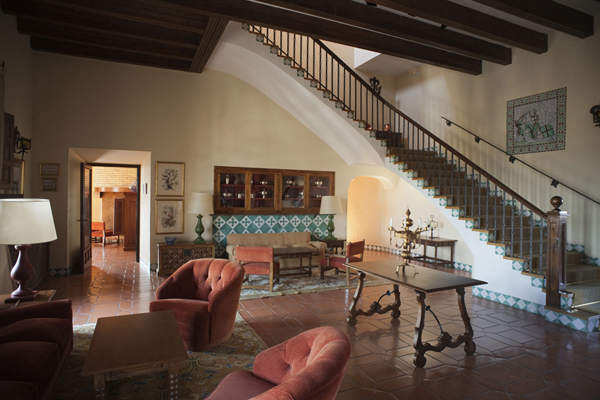
Interior.
