= Pietro da Pavia =

Italian bishop

Pietro da Pavia, Can.Reg. (died 1 August 1182) was bishop-elect of Meaux (1171–1175), Cardinal-Priest of S. Crisogono (1173–1179) and finally Cardinal-Bishop of Tusculum (in May 1179). He was papal legate, together with Henri de Marsiac, in southern France against Cathars and Waldenses 1174–1178. He participated in the Third Lateran Council in 1179. Then he was sent again as papal legate to southern France and to Germany. He subscribed the papal bulls issued between October 14, 1173 and July 14, 1182. In 1180 he was elected archbishop of Bourges but it seems that he did not assume that post.
