= Raymond Roger Trencavel =

Member of Trencavel family

- Viscount of Carcassonne, Béziers, Albi and Razès
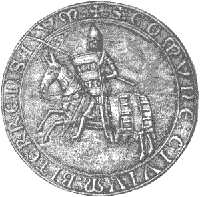
- Seal of Raymond Roger
- Predecessor: Roger II Trencavel
- Successor: Raymond II Trencavel
- Born: 1185
- Died: 10 November 1209 (aged 23–24); Carcassonne
- Noble family: Trencavel
- Spouse: Agnes of Montpellier
- Issue: Raymond II Trencavel
- Father: Roger II Trencavel
- Mother: Azalais of Toulouse

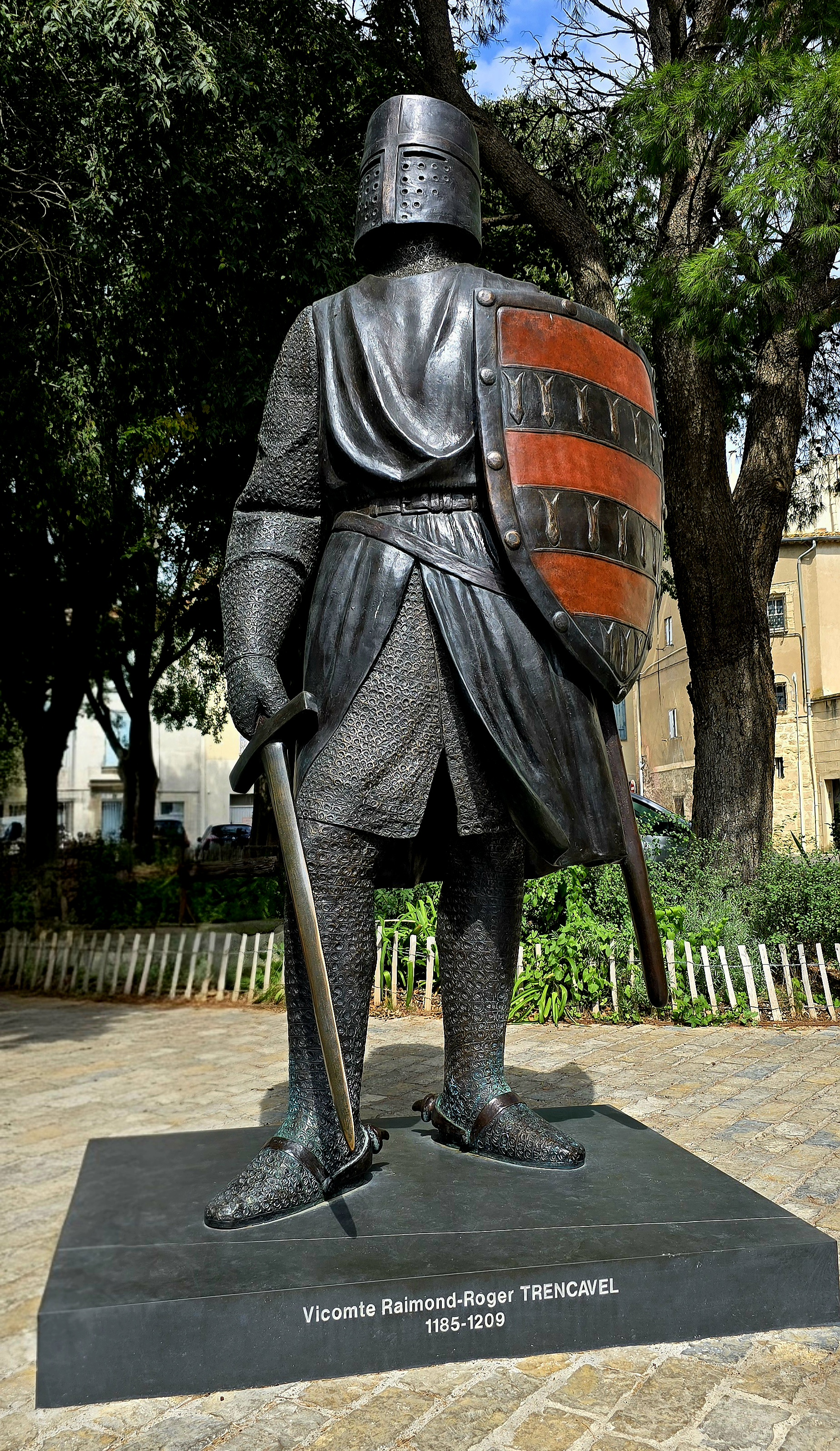
Statue in front of Béziers Cathedral

Raymond Roger Trencavel (also Raimond, Occitan: Raimon Rogièr; 1185 – 10 November 1209) was a member of the noble Trencavel family. He was viscount of Béziers and Albi (and thus a vassal of the count of Toulouse), and viscount of Carcassonne and the Razès (and thus a vassal of the count of Barcelona, which was also ruling Aragon at this time).

== Early life ==
Raymond-Roger was the son of Roger II Trencavel (d. 1194), and of Azalais of Toulouse (also known as the "Countess of Burlats"), daughter of Raymond V of Toulouse and sister of Raymond VI. Raymond-Roger was married to Agnes of Montpellier. His aunt, Beatrice of Béziers, was the second wife of Raymond VI of Toulouse.

Raymond-Roger lived in the Château Comtal in the fortified hill town of Carcassonne. The château was built by his ancestors in the 11th century. Although Raymond-Roger was not a Cathar, many of his subjects were, and he adopted a laissez-faire attitude to Catharism. Béziers also had a substantial Jewish population.

== Albigensian Crusade ==
By mid-1209, at the beginning of the Albigensian Crusade, around 20,000 crusaders had gathered in Lyon and began to march south. In June, Raymond of Toulouse, recognizing the potential disaster at hand, promised to act against the Cathars, and his excommunication was lifted. The crusaders headed towards Montpellier and the lands of Raymond-Roger de Trencavel, aiming for the Cathar communities around Albi and Carcassonne. Like Raymond VI of Toulouse, Raymond-Roger de Trencavel sought an accommodation with the crusaders, but Raymond-Roger was refused a meeting and raced back to Carcassonne to prepare his defences. The city of Béziers was sacked in July and its population massacred.

The town of Carcassonne was well fortified, but vulnerable and over-populated with refugees. The crusaders, led by a papal legate, Arnaud Amaury, Abbot of Cîteaux, arrived outside the town on 1 August 1209 and placed it under siege. As vassal of King Peter II of Aragon, Raymond-Roger had hoped for protection, but Peter was powerless to oppose Pope Innocent III's army and could act only as a mediator.

The siege did not last long. By 7 August the crusaders had cut the town's access to water. Raymond-Roger accepted a safe-conduct to negotiate terms of surrender in the Crusader camp. During these negotiations, Raymond Roger voluntarily gave himself up as a prisoner, possibly to secure the safety of the inhabitants of the town.

Carcassonne surrendered on 15 August. The inhabitants were not massacred but were forced to leave the town with nothing but the clothes on their backs. Simon de Montfort was granted control of the area encompassing Carcassonne, Albi, and Béziers. Raymond-Roger's dispossessed son, Raymond II (1204-1263), formally ceded his rights to Louis IX of France in 1247, after several failed attempts to recover his patrimony.

== Death ==
Following his surrender at the Siege of Carcassonne, Raymond Roger was imprisoned in the town and kept there by Simon de Montfort. He died of dysentery on 10 November 1209. After his death, rumors circulated that he had been poisoned, though this was denied by Simon de Montfort.
