= John of Canterbury =

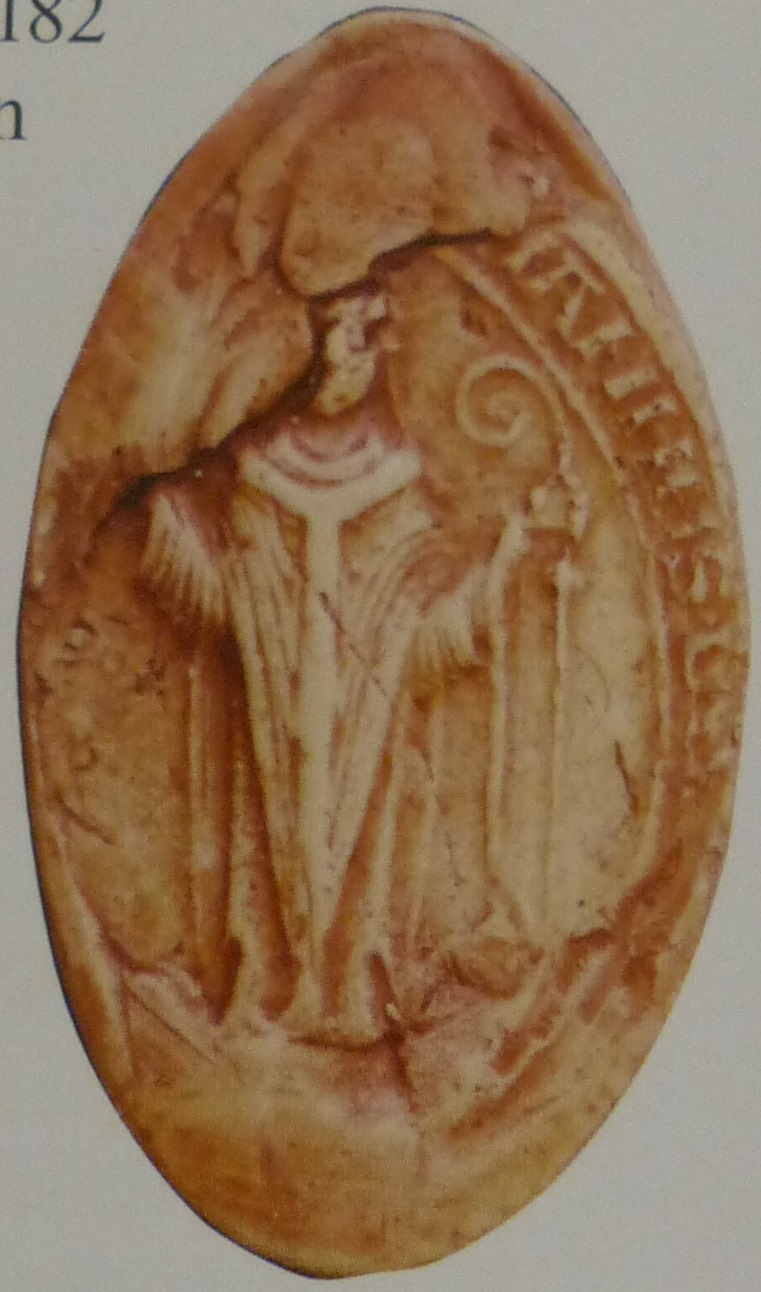
Seal of the Archbishop of Lyon Jean Bellesmains

John of Canterbury (died 1204) (Note: Known also as Jean de Bellème, John of Poitiers, John of Belmeis, Jean de Belmeia, Jean aux Belles-Mains, Jean des Bellesmains and Jean de Bellesmes.) was Bishop of Poitiers 1162 to 1181 and subsequently Archbishop of Lyon 1181 to 1193. He became a "cosmopolitan and much-respected churchman".

He began as a clerk to Theobald of Canterbury. He became Treasurer of York in 1152. At the wish of Henry II of England, he was made Bishop of Poitiers, and consecrated at the Council of Tours in 1163. He was a close supporter of Thomas Becket in his quarrel with Henry II.

Though John was elected Archbishop of Narbonne, he did not take up that see since the election was superseded by his being elected to Lyon, which he accepted. At Lyon, he banned preaching by the Waldensians.

John later resigned the see of Lyon to become a monk at the Cistercian Clairvaux Abbey, where he lived out the rest of his life. In his retirement, he received an important papal letter, Cum Marthae circa, dated 29 November 1202.

== Sources ==
- Archer, Thomas Andrew (1885). "Belmeis, John" . In Stephen, Leslie (ed.). Dictionary of National Biography. Vol. 4. London: Smith, Elder & Co.
- Dunbabin, Jean. "Canterbury, John of (c.1120–1204?)". Oxford Dictionary of National Biography (online ed.). Oxford University Press. doi:10.1093/ref:odnb/2062. (Subscription or UK public library membership required.)
