= Roger II Trencavel =

Viscount of Carcassonne, Béziers, Razès and Albi (died 1194)

Roger II Trencavel (died March 1194) was the Viscount of Carcassonne, Béziers, Razès, and Albi from 1167 or 1171 until his death. Until 1177 he used the title proconsul, usually as proconsul de Bitteris (of Béziers), but he abandoned the usage when he became a vassal of the Crown of Aragon. His government of his lands was characterised by increasing complexity, such as the development of the offices of seneschal and sub-vicar, but his later years are characterised by financial troubles and a "general malaise" perhaps brought about by his poor relations with the Church hierarchy in light of his favourable attitude towards Catharism.

Roger was the elder of two sons of Raymond I Trencavel and Saure. As a child in 1153 he was placed in the "custody and service" of Ermengard of Narbonne. Eventually he inherited all four of Raymond's viscounties on his death in 1167. However, Raymond V of Toulouse objected to the young Roger and instead enfeoffed Roger-Bernard I of Foix with the viscounties in December 1167 at Narbonne. Roger rebelled. He retook Béziers in 1169 with the assistance of troops from Aragon and Catalonia. After taking the city, Roger brought the Aragonese inside to murder the citizens who had handed the city over to his rival. However, in November 1171, Raymond drew Roger away from Alfonso II of Aragon by enfeoffing him with the viscounties and depriving the count of Foix.

Roger married the young Adalais, daughter of Raymond of Toulouse, in 1171. It opened the only (brief) period of alliance between Roger and Raymond. Adalais' dowry was the town of Minerve, a fief of the King of France. In 1176, Roger held a public inquiry to prove his lordship of the village of Mèze. About the same time (c. 1175), Alfonso of Aragon held a public inquiry to prove that Carcassonne was his possession and that Roger II merely held it from him at his pleasure. In the late 1180s, Roger began the compilation of a cartulary to collect the charter evidence for his rule. The cartulary contained 248 folios and was written in proto-Gothic script.

Roger was a close ally of Ermengard of Narbonne from 1171 onwards, when the viscount and viscountess swore oaths of mutual alliance. In 1177, he joined an alliance with Ermengard and William VIII of Montpellier to prevent Raymond from seizing Narbonne. In 1179, he was forced to forswear his former alliance with Raymond of Toulouse and return to the fold of Alfonso of Aragon. He recognised that he held his fiefs from Alfonso. Roger agreed to hold Minerve from the king of Aragon instead of the king of France, significant of a realignment in the politics of the lords of Languedoc with respect to central authority. Some have suggested that Roger was driven to the side of Alfonso by the results of the Third Lateran Council and by Raymond of Toulouse' request for assistance in dealing with heresy in his domains. Roger appears therefore as lenient towards heretics.

Around 1175, Roger imprisoned Gerard, the bishop of Albi, probably over the disputed lordship of Albi. Roger succeeded in establishing a vicar (Pierre Raimond d'Hautpoul) in Albi between 1175 and 1177, but he was forced to come to humiliating terms with the bishop William of Dourgne in 1193. In 1178 Henry of Marcy, who was leading a papal legation in the region, marched on Albi, whence Roger fled to Ambialet, and the on Castres, where they declared him a heretic and excommunicated him after releasing the bishop Gerard. In 1179, he was excommunicated again by Pons d'Arsac for his "conspicuous lack of enthusiasm for the extirpation of heresy" under the twenty-seventh canon of the Third Lateran Council and the decretal Ad abolendam of Pope Lucius III. He was also accused of hiring routiers. In 1181, Henry of Marcy returned to the south of France and besieged Roger and his wife in Lavaur, which was promptly surrendered.

In 1185, Alfonso was making war on Raymond over the possession of Provence. From Aix he travelled to Najac, where, probably in April, he made a treaty with Richard the Lionheart and with Roger against Raymond of Toulouse. Roger in gratitude followed Alfonso into Spain and to the siege of Valencia, where, in June, he adopted the king's son Alfonso II of Provence as his heir, even though his wife was expecting. Perhaps the adoption was cautionary in case the child of Adalais was a girl. Alfonso of Provence did not succeed Roger, rather that child, which was a boy named Raymond Roger, did. In 1188, Alfonso of Aragon came north of the Pyrenees again to defend Roger at Carcassonne, but he also granted away that viscounty as well as the Razès to Raimond-Roger of Foix in a move to dispossess the Trencavels entirely.

In 1189, Roger fell seriously ill and made his will. After his recovery in 1191, however, he gathered his vassals and made them swear fealty to his son, which they did.

== Sources ==
- Cheyette, Fredric L. Ermengard of Narbonne and the World of the Troubadours. Ithaca: Cornell University Press, 2001.
- Graham-Leigh, Elaine. The Southern French Nobility and the Albigensian Crusade. Woodbridge: The Boydell Press, 2005. ISBN 1-84383-129-5
