= Viscount of Béziers =

Coat of arms of the viscountcy of Béziers

This is a list of Viscounts of Béziers, who ruled the viscounty of Béziers.

- Reinard I of Béziers 881–897
- Adelaide of Béziers (daughter) 897– ?
- Boso viscount of Agde 897–? (married to Adelaide)
- Teude of Béziers and Agde (son) ?–936
- Junus of Béziers and Agde (son) 936–960
- Reinard II of Béziers and Agde (son) 960–967
- Guillaume I of Béziers and Agde (son) 967–994
- Garsende of Béziers and Agde (daughter) 994–1034
- Bernard of Anduze 934–? (married to Garsende)
- Raymond I of Comminges (Raymond Roger I count of Carcassonne) (married to Garsende)
- Pierre I of Carcassonne 1034–1059

The viscount of Béziers were also counts of Carcassonne from 1034.
