= Barillot =

Barillot is a surname. Notable people with the surname include:

- Bernard Barillot (born 1949), French painter and calligrapher
- Léon Barillot (1844–1929), French painter and engraver
