= List of Gothic cathedrals in Europe =

This is a list of gothic cathedrals in Europe that are active Christian cathedrals (the seats of bishops), but also includes former cathedrals and churches built in the style of cathedrals, that are significant for their Gothic style of architecture. As such, some of the buildings listed here are parish churches or have other uses.

== Gothic cathedrals in Europe ==
Cathedral	Archdiocese or Diocese	Location	Country	Dedication	Notes	Image
St Albans Cathedral; Cathedral and Abbey Church of St Alban	St Albans	St Albans	England	Saint Alban	cathedral	
Albi Cathedral; Cathédrale Sainte-Cécile d'Albi	Albi	Albi	France	Saint Cecilia	cathedral, minor basilica, World Heritage Site	
Amiens Cathedral; Cathédrale Notre-Dame d'Amiens	Amiens	Amiens	France	Blessed Virgin Mary	cathedral, minor basilica; World Heritage Site	
Angers Cathedral; Cathédrale Saint-Maurice d'Angers	Angers	Angers	France	Saint Maurice	cathedral	
Church of St. Anne, Vilnius; Šv. Onos bažnyčia	Vilnius	Vilnius	Lithuania	Saint Anne	parish church	
Antwerp Cathedral; Onze-Lieve-Vrouwekathedraal	Antwerp	Antwerp	Belgium	Blessed Virgin Mary	cathedral	
Autun Cathedral; Cathédrale Saint-Lazare d'Autun	Autun	Autun	France	Saint Lazarus of Aix	cathedral (built in the 12th century), minor basilica	
Auxerre Cathedral; Cathédrale Saint-Étienne d'Auxerre	Sens and Auxerre	Auxerre	France	Saint Stephen	cathedral	
St. Barbara's Church, Kutná Hora; Katedrál sv. panny Barbory	Hradec Králové	Kutná Hora	Czech Republic	St Barbara	parish church; World Heritage Site	
Barcelona Cathedral; Catedral de la Santa Creu i Santa Eulàlia	Barcelona	Barcelona	Spain	Holy Cross and Saint Eulalia	cathedral	
Cathedral of St. Bartholomew, Plzeň; Katedrála svatého Bartoloměje	Plzeň	Plzeň	Czech Republic	Bartholomew the Apostle	cathedral	
Beauvais Cathedral; Cathédrale Saint-Pierre de Beauvais	Beauvais	Beauvais	France	Saint Peter	cathedral	
Burgos Cathedral; Santa Iglesia Basílica Catedral Metropolitana de Santa María de Burgos	Burgos	Burgos	Spain	Virgin Mary	cathedral; World Heritage Site	
Black Church; Biserica Neagră	Lutheran	Brașov	Romania	Blessed Virgin Mary	parish church	
Bordeaux Cathedral; Cathédrale Saint-André de Bordeaux	Bordeaux	Bordeaux	France	Saint Andrew	cathedral; World Heritage Site	
Bourges Cathedral; Cathédrale Saint-Étienne de Bourges	Bourges	Bourges	France	Saint Stephen	cathedral; World Heritage Site	
Bremen Cathedral; St.-Petri-Dom zu Bremen	Protestant	Bremen	Germany	Saint Peter	parish church, formerly cathedral of the Prince-Archbishopric of Bremen	
Church of Our Lady, Bruges; Onze-Lieve-Vrouwekerk	Bruges	Bruges	Belgium	Blessed Virgin Mary	parish Church	
Bristol Cathedral; Cathedral Church of the Holy and Undivided Trinity	Bristol	Bristol	England	Holy Trinity	cathedral	
Brussels Cathedral; Cathédrale des Saints Michel et Gudule; Kathedraal van Sint-Michiel en Sint-Goedele	Mechelen–Brussels	Brussels	Belgium	Saint Michael, Saint Gudula	co-cathedral	
Cahors Cathedral; Cathédrale Saint-Étienne de Cahors	Cahors	Cahors	France	Saint Stephen	cathedral	
Canterbury Cathedral; Cathedral and Metropolitical Church of Christ at Canterbury	Canterbury	Canterbury	England	Christ	cathedral; World Heritage Site	
Carcassonne Cathedral; Cathédrale Saint-Michel de Carcassonne	Carcassonne et Narbonne	Carcassonne	France	Saint Michael	cathedral	
Basilica of St. Nazaire and St. Celse, Carcassonne; Basilique Saint-Nazaire-et-Saint-Celse de Carcassonne	Carcassonne et Narbonne	Carcassonne	France	Saints Nazarius and Celsus	former cathedral, minor basilica	
Chalon Cathedral; Cathédrale Saint-Vincent de Chalon	Autun	Chalon-sur-Saône	France	Saint Vincent	former cathedral	
Châlons Cathedral; Cathédrale Saint-Étienne de Châlons	Châlons	Châlons-en-Champagne	France	Saint Stephen	cathedral	
Chartres Cathedral; Cathédrale Notre-Dame de Chartres	Chartres	Chartres	France	Blessed Virgin Mary	cathedral, minor basilica; World Heritage Site	
Chichester Cathedral; Cathedral Church of the Holy Trinity	Chichester	Chichester	England	Holy Trinity	cathedral	
Clermont-Ferrand Cathedral; Cathédrale Notre-Dame-de-l'Assomption de Clermont-Ferrand	Clermont	Clermont-Ferrand	France	Assumption of the Blessed Virgin Mary	cathedral	
Cologne Cathedral; Hohe Domkirche St. Petrus und Maria	Cologne	Cologne	Germany	Saint Peter, Saint Mary	cathedral; World Heritage site	
Coutances Cathedral; Cathédrale Notre-Dame de Coutances	Coutances	Coutances	France	Blessed Virgin Mary	cathedral	
Basilica of Saint-Denis; Basilique Saint-Denis	Saint-Denis	Saint-Denis	France	Saint Denis	cathedral	
Dijon Cathedral; Cathédrale Saint-Bénigne de Dijon	Dijon	Dijon	France	Saint Benignus	cathedral	
Dol Cathedral; Cathédrale Saint-Samson de Dol	Rennes	Dol-de-Bretagne	France	Saint Samson	former cathedral	
Christ Church Cathedral, Dublin; Cathedral Church of the Holy Trinity	Dublin and Glendalough	Dublin	Ireland	Holy Trinity	cathedral	
Durham Cathedral; The Cathedral Church of Christ, Blessed Mary the Virgin and St Cuthbert of Durham	Durham	Durham	England	Jesus Christ, Blessed Virgin Mary, and Saint Cuthbert	cathedral; World Heritage Site	
St Elisabeth Cathedral; Dóm svätej Alžbety; Szent Erzsébet-székesegyház	Košice	Košice	Slovakia	St Elisabeth of Hungary	cathedral	
Ely Cathedral; Cathedral Church of the Holy and Undivided Trinity	Ely	Ely	England	Holy Trinity	cathedral	
Erfurt Cathedral; Hohe Domkirche St. Marien zu Erfurt	Erfurt	Erfurt	Germany	Saint Mary	cathedral	
Exeter Cathedral; Cathedral Church of Saint Peter	Exeter	Exeter	England	Saint Peter	cathedral	
Florence Cathedral; Cattedrale di Santa Maria del Fiore or Duomo di Firenze	Florence	Florence	Italy	Blessed Virgin Mary	cathedral, minor basilica	
Frankfurt Cathedral; Frankfurter Dom or Cathedral of Saint Bartholomew	Limburg	Frankfurt	Germany	Bartholomew the Apostle	parish church, considered an imperial cathedral	
Freiburg Minster; Münster unserer lieben Frau	Freiburg	Freiburg im Breisgau	Germany	Saint Mary	cathedral	
Archcathedral Basilica of the Assumption of the Blessed Virgin Mary and St. Andrew, Frombork; Bazylika archikatedralna Wniebowzięcia Najświętszej Maryi Panny i św. Andrzeja we Fromborku	Warmia	Frombork	Poland	Assumption of Mary and Andrew the Apostle	cathedral	
Ghent Cathedral; Sint Baafskathedraal	Ghent	Ghent	Belgium	Saint Bavo of Ghent	parish Church	
Gloucester Cathedral; Cathedral Church of St Peter and the Holy and Indivisible Trinity	Gloucester	Gloucester	England	St Peter and the Holy and Indivisible Trinity	cathedral	
Gniezno Cathedral; Bazylika prymasowska Wniebowzięcia Najświętszej Maryi Panny w Gnieźnie	Gniezno	Gniezno	Poland	Assumption of Mary	cathedral	
Hasselt Cathedral Sint-Quintinuskathedraal	Hasselt	Hasselt	Belgium	Saint Quentin	cathedral	entre
Hereford Cathedral; Cathedral of Saint Mary the Virgin and Saint Ethelbert the King	Hereford	Hereford	England	Saint Mary and St Ethelbert the King	cathedral	
's-Hertogenbosch Cathedral; Cathedral Church of St. John (Sint-Janskathedraal)	's-Hertogenbosch	's-Hertogenbosch	Netherlands	John the Evangelist	cathedral	
Cathedral of the Holy Spirit, Hradec Králové; Katedrála svatého Ducha	Hradec Králové	Hradec Králové	Czech Republic	Holy Spirit	cathedral	
Basilica of St. James and St. Agnes, Nysa; Bazylika pw. św. Jakuba Apostoła i św. Agnieszki, Dziewicy i Męczennicy	Wrocław	Nysa	Poland	St. James the Greater and St. Agnes of Rome	parish church, In 1650-1810 permanent seat of bishops of Wrocław	
Konstanz Minster; Münster Unserer Lieben Frau	Freiburg	Konstanz	Germany	Saint Mary	parish church, formerly cathedral of the Diocese of Konstanz	
St. Lambert's Church, Münster; St. Lamberti	Münster	Münster	Germany	Saint Lambert	Parish church	
Langres Cathedral; Cathédrale Saint-Mammès de Langres	Langres	Langres	France	Saint Mammes	cathedral	
Laon Cathedral; Cathédrale Notre-Dame de Laon	Soissons	Laon	France	Blessed Virgin Mary	former cathedral	
Le Mans Cathedral; Cathédrale St-Julien du Mans	Le Mans	Le Mans	France	Saint Julian	cathedral	
León Cathedral; Catedral de Santa María de Regla de León	León	León	Spain	Blessed Virgin Mary	cathedral	
Lichfield Cathedral; Cathedral Church of the Blessed Virgin Mary and St Chad	Lichfield	Lichfield	England	St Chad and Saint Mary	cathedral	
Lincoln Cathedral; Cathedral Church of the Blessed Virgin Mary of Lincoln	Lincoln	Lincoln	England	The Blessed Virgin Mary of Lincoln	cathedral	
Lisieux Cathedral; Cathédrale Saint-Pierre de Lisieux	Bayeux	Lisieux	France	Saint Peter	former cathedral	
Lübeck Cathedral; Dom zu Lübeck	Lutheran	Lübeck	Germany	John the Baptist; Saint Blaise; Saint Mary; Saint Nicholas	formerly cathedral of the Diocese of Lübeck, part of a World Heritage Site	
Lyon Cathedral; Cathédrale Primatiale Saint-Jean-Baptiste de Lyon	Lyon	Lyon	France	Saint John the Baptist	cathedral; World Heritage Site	
Magdeburg Cathedral; Dom zu Magdeburg St. Mauritius und Katharina	Lutheran	Magdeburg	Germany	Saint Maurice; Catherine of Alexandria	cathedral, formerly cathedral of the Archbishopric of Magdeburg	
St. Mary's Church, Gdańsk; Bazylika konkatedralna Wniebowzięcia Najświętszej Maryi Panny w Gdańsku	Gdańsk	Gdańsk	Poland	Assumption of Mary	co-cathedral	
St. Mary's Basilica (Church of Our Lady Assumed into Heaven); Kościół Mariacki (Kościół archiprezbiterialny Wniebowzięcia Najświętszej Marii Panny)	Kraków	Kraków	Poland	Blessed Virgin Mary	parish church, part of a World Heritage Site	
St Mary Redcliffe; St Mary Redcliffe	Bristol	Bristol	England	St Mary Redcliffe	parish church	
Matthias Church (Church of Our Lady); Mátyás-templom (Nagyboldogasszony-templom)	Esztergom-Budapest	Budapest	Hungary	Blessed Virgin Mary	parish church, part of a World Heritage Site	
Meaux Cathedral; Cathédrale Saint-Étienne de Meaux	Meaux	Meaux	France	Saint Stephen	cathedral, minor basilica	
Meissen Cathedral; St. Johannis und St. Donatus	Lutheran	Meissen	Germany	John the Evangelist; Donatus of Arezzo	cathedral, formerly cathedral of the Diocese of Dresden-Meissen	
Metz Cathedral; Cathédrale Saint-Étienne de Metz	Metz	Metz	France	Saint Stephen	cathedral	
Milan Cathedral; Basilica cattedrale metropolitana di Santa Maria Nascente	Milan	Milan	Italy	Nativity of Mary	cathedral and basilica	
Munich Frauenkirche; Dom zu Unserer Lieben Frau	Munich and Freising	Munich	Germany	Saint Mary	cathedral	
Münster Cathedral; St.-Paulus-Dom	Münster	Münster	Germany	Saint Paul	cathedral	
Nantes Cathedral; Cathédrale Saint-Pierre-et-Saint-Paul de Nantes	Nantes	Nantes	France	Saint Peter; Paul the Apostle	cathedral	
Naumburg Cathedral; Naumburger Dom St. Peter und Paul	Protestant	Naumburg	Germany	Saint Peter; Paul the Apostle	parish church, formerly cathedral of the Bishopric of Naumburg-Zeitz, World Heritage Site	
Nevers Cathedral; Cathédrale Saint-Cyr-et-Sainte-Julitte de Nevers	Nevers	Nevers	France	Saints Cyriacus and Julitta	cathedral, minor basilica	
Norwich Cathedral; Cathedral Church of the Holy and Undivided Trinity	Norwich	Norwich	England	The Holy Trinity	cathedral	
Notre-Dame de Paris; Cathédrale Notre-Dame de Paris	Paris	Paris	France	Blessed Virgin Mary	cathedral, minor basilica; World Heritage site; damaged by fire in 2019	
Noyon Cathedral; Cathédrale Notre-Dame de Noyon	Beauvais	Noyon	France	Blessed Virgin Mary	former cathedral	
Orléans Cathedral; Cathédrale Sainte-Croix d'Orléans	Orléans	Orléans	France	Holy Cross	cathedral, minor basilica	|-
Orvieto Cathedral; Duomo di Orvieto or Cattedrale di Santa Maria Assunta	Orvieto-Todi	Orvieto	Italy	Assumption of the Virgin Mary	cathedral	
Oviedo Cathedral; Santa Iglesia Basílica Catedral Metropolitana de San Salvador de Oviedo	Oviedo	Oviedo	Spain	Saint Salvador	cathedral	
Oxford Cathederal; Christ Church Cathedral of Oxford	Oxford	Oxford	England	Christ	cathedral; World Heritage Site	
Paderborn Cathedral; Hoher Dom St. Maria, St. Liborius, St. Kilian	Paderborn	Paderborn	Germany	Saint Mary; Liborius of Le Mans; Saint Kilian	cathedral	
Palma Cathedral; Catedral-Basílica de Santa María de Palma de Mallorca	Majorca	Palma, Majorca	Spain	Assumption of Mary	cathedral	
Cathedral Basilica of the Assumption, Pelplin; Bazylika katedralna Wniebowzięcia Najświętszej Maryi Panny w Pelplinie	Pelplin	Pelplin	Poland	Assumption of Mary	cathedral	
Cathedral of St. Peter and Paul, Brno; Katedrála svatého Petra a Pavla	Brno	Brno	Czech Republic	Saint Peter and Paul the Apostle	cathedral	
Peterborough Cathedral; Cathedral Church of St Peter, St Paul¨, and St Andrew	Peterborough	Peterborough	England	Saint Peter, Saint Paul and Saint Andrew	cathedral	
Poitiers Cathedral; Cathédrale Saint-Pierre de Poitiers	Poitiers	Poitiers	France	Saint Peter	cathedral, minor basilica	
Pontoise Cathedral; Cathédrale Saint-Maclou de Pontoise	Pontoise	Pontoise	France	Saint Maclovius	cathedral	
Poznań Cathedral; Bazylika archikatedralna Świętych Apostołów Piotra i Pawła w Poznaniu	Poznań	Poznań	Poland	Saint Peter and Paul the Apostle	cathedral	
Church of the Assumption of Our Lady and Saint John the Baptist; Kostel Nanebevzetí Panny Marie	Hradec Králové	Kutná Hora	Czech Republic	Blessed Virgin Mary and St. John the Baptist	parish church; World Heritage Site	
Regensburg Cathedral; Dom St. Peter	Regensburg	Regensburg	Germany	Saint Peter	cathedral, part of a World Heritage Site	
Reims Cathedral; Cathédrale Notre-Dame de Reims	Reims	Reims	France	Assumption of Mary	cathedral; World Heritage Site	
Ripon Cathedral; Cathedral Church of St Peter and St Wilfrid	Leeds	Ripon, North Yorkshire	England	Saint Peter and Saint Wilfrid	cathedral	
Rochester Cathedral; Cathedral Church of Christ and the Blessed Virgin Mary	Rochester	Rochester, Kent	England	Christ and the Blessed Virgin Mary	cathedral	
Rodez Cathedral; Cathédrale Notre-Dame de Rodez	Rodez	Rodez	France	Blessed Virgin Mary	cathedral, minor basilica	
St. Rumbold's Cathedral Sint-Romboutskathedraal	Mechelen-Brussels	Mechelen	Belgium	Saint Rumbold	cathedral	
Roskilde Cathedral; Roskilde Domkirke	Roskilde	Roskilde	Denmark	St. Lucius	cathedral; World Heiritage Site	
Rotterdam Cathedral; St. Lawrence Church (Grote or Sint-Laurenskerk)	Protestant	Rotterdam	Netherlands	Saint Lawrence	parish church	
Rouen Cathedral; Cathédrale Notre-Dame de l'Assomption de Rouen	Rouen	Rouen	France	Assumption of Mary	cathedral	
Salisbury Cathedral; Cathedral of the Blessed Virgin Mary	Salisbury	Salisbury	England	Blessed Virgin Mary	cathedral	
Sées Cathedral; Cathédrale Notre-Dame de Sées	Sées	Sées	France	Blessed Virgin Mary	cathedral, minor basilica	
Senlis Cathedral; Cathédrale Notre-Dame de Senlis	Beauvais	Senlis	France	Blessed Virgin Mary	parish church	
Sens Cathedral; Cathédrale Saint-Étienne de Sens	Sens	Sens	France	Saint Stephen	cathedral	
Seville Cathedral; Catedral de Santa María de la Sede	Seville	Seville	Spain	Virgin Mary	cathedral	
Siena Cathedral; Cattedrale Metropolitana di Santa Maria Assunta	Siena-Colle di Val d'Elsa-Montalcino	Siena	Italy	Assumption of the Virgin Mary	cathedral	
Soissons Cathedral; Cathédrale Saint-Gervais-et-Saint-Protais de Soissons	Soissons	Soissons	France	Saints Gervasius and Protasius	cathedral, minor basilica	
Southwell Minster; Cathedral and Parish Church of the Blessed Virgin Mary	Southwell and Nottingham	Southwell, Nottinghamshire	England	Blessed Virgin Mary	parish church	
Strasbourg Cathedral; Cathédrale Notre-Dame de Strasbourg	Strasbourg	Strasbourg	France	Blessed Virgin Mary	cathedral	
St. Stephen's Cathedral, Vienna; Stephansdom	Vienna	Vienna	Austria	Saint Stephen	cathedral	
Świdnica Cathedral; Katedra św. Stanisława i św. Wacława w Świdnicy	Świdnica	Świdnica	Poland	St. Stanislaus and St. Wenceslaus	cathedral	
Toledo Cathedral; Catedral Primada Santa María de Toledo	Toledo	Toledo	Spain	Virgin Mary	cathedral	
Toruń Cathedral (Church of St. John the Baptist and St. John the Evangelist); Bazylika katedralna św. Jana Chrzciciela i św. Jana Ewangelisty w Toruniu	Toruń	Toruń	Poland	St. John the Baptist and St. John the Evangelist	cathedral	
Toulouse Cathedral; Cathédrale Saint-Étienne de Toulouse	Toulouse	Toulouse	France	Saint Stephen	cathedral	
Tours Cathedral; Cathédrale Saint-Gatien de Tours	Tours	Tours	France	Saint Gatianus	cathedral	
Church of Our Lady in Trier; Liebfrauenkirche	Trier	Trier	Germany	Saint Mary	parish church, World Heritage Site	
Troyes Cathedral; Cathédrale Saint-Pierre-et-Saint-Paul de Troyes	Troyes	Troyes	France	Saint Peter and Saint Paul	cathedral	
Church of Our Lady before Týn (Týn church); Kostel Matky Boží před Týnem (Týnský chrám)	Prague	Prague	Czech Republic	Blessed Virgin Mary	parish church	
Ulm Minster; Münster Unserer Lieben Frau in Ulm	Lutheran	Ulm	Germany	Saint Mary	parish church	
Cathedral of St Vitus; Katedrála svatého Víta, Václava a Vojtěcha	Prague	Prague	Czech Republic	Saints Vitus, Wenceslaus and Adalbert	cathedral	
Wawel Cathedral; Królewska Bazylika Archikatedralna Św. Stanisława i Wacława na Wawelu	Kraków	Kraków	Poland	Saints Stanislaus and Wenceslaus	cathedral	
Wells Cathedral; Cathedral Church of St Andrew	Bath and Wells	Wells	England	St Andrew the Apostle	cathedral	
Winchester Cathedral; Cathedral Church of the Holy Trinity	Winchester	Winchester	England	Holy Trinity	cathedral	
Wroclaw Cathedral; Archikatedra św. Jana Chrzciciela	Wrocław	Wrocław	Poland	John the Baptist	cathedral	
York Minster; Cathedral and Metropolitical Church of St Peter	York	York	England	Saint Peter	cathedral	
Zagreb Cathedral; Zagrebačka katedrala	Zagreb	Zagreb	Croatia	Assumption of Mary	cathedral	

== See also ==
- Gothic cathedrals and churches
- List of cathedrals
- List of basilicas
- European Route of Brick Gothic
- Notre Dame de Roscudon Church

== Sources ==
- List of Cathedrals by GCatholic.org
- Catholic Hierarchy
