= Carcassonne Cathedral =

National monument in Occitanie, France

Cathedral of Saint Michael of Carcassonne Cathédrale Saint-Michel de Carcassonne
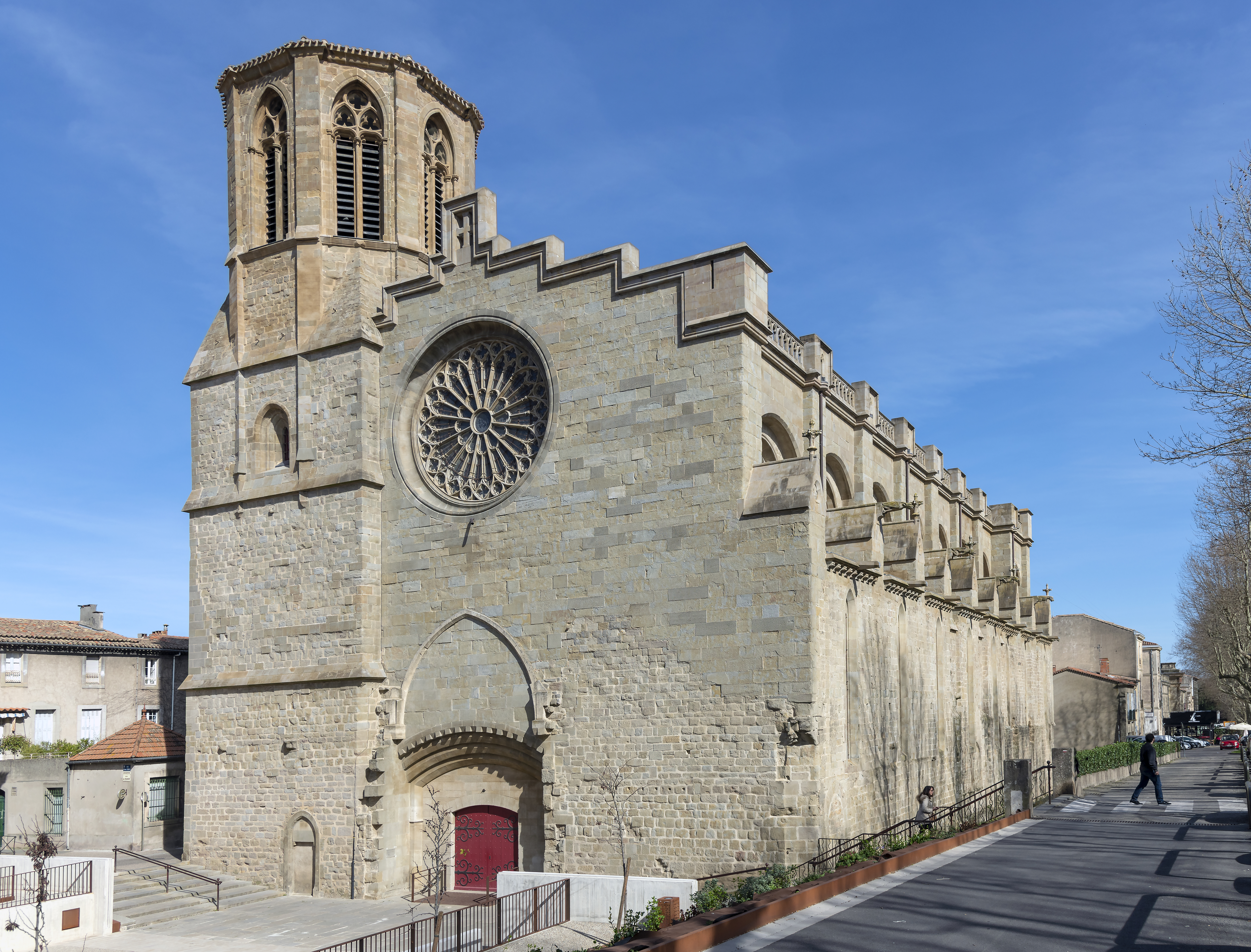
- Carcassonne Cathedral

Religion
- Affiliation: Roman Catholic
- Diocese: Diocese of Carcassonne-Narbonne
- Ecclesiastical or organisational status: Cathedral

Location
- Location: Carcassonne, France
- Interactive map of Cathedral of Saint Michael of Carcassonne; Cathédrale Saint-Michel de Carcassonne
- Coordinates: 43°12′39″N 2°21′4″E

Architecture
- Type: Church
- Style: Gothic

Carcassonne Cathedral (French: Cathédrale Saint-Michel de Carcassonne) is a cathedral and designated national monument in Carcassonne, France. It is the seat of the Roman Catholic Bishop of Carcassonne and Narbonne.

The building was built in the thirteenth century as a parish church, dedicated to Saint Michael. Following damage in the fourteenth century Hundred Years' War it was rebuilt as a fortified church.

In 1803 St. Michael's was elevated to cathedral status, replacing the earlier cathedral dedicated to Saints Nazarius and Celsus, now the Basilica of St. Nazaire and St. Celse.

St. Michael's is used by the Priestly Fraternity of Saint Peter.

== See also ==
- Basilica of St. Nazaire and St. Celse, Carcassonne
- List of Gothic Cathedrals in Europe
