= Basilica of Saints Nazarius and Celsus =

Catholic church located in Aude, France

- Basilique des Saints Nazaire et Celse
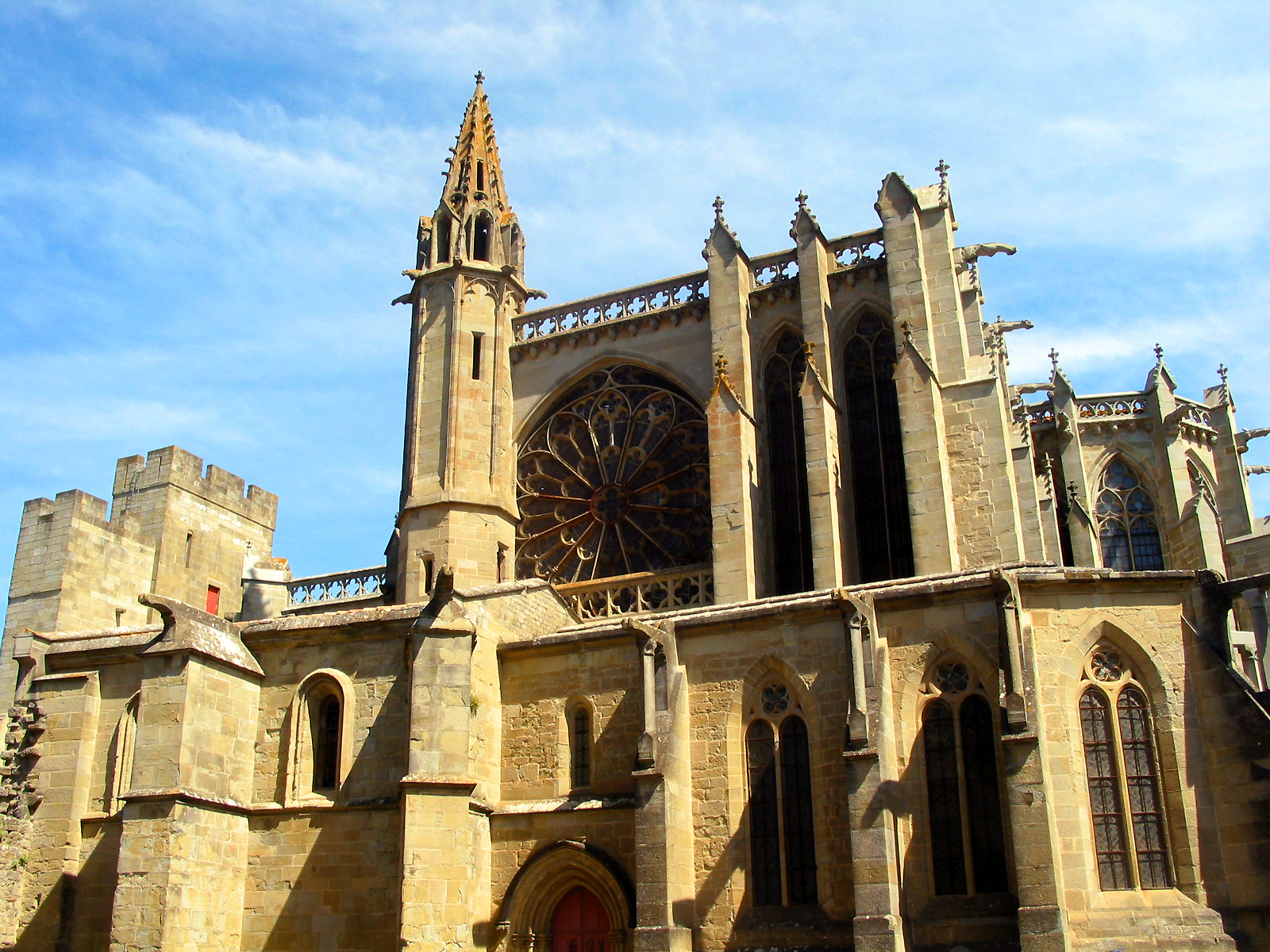
- Southern transept of the basilica

Religion
- Affiliation: Roman Catholicism
- Ecclesiastical or organizational status: Minor basilica
- Patron: Saints Nazarius and Celsus

Location
- Location: Carcassonne, Languedoc-Rousillon, France
- Interactive map of Basilica of Saints Nazarius and Celsus
- Coordinates: 43°12′19″N 2°21′46″E

Architecture
- Type: church
- Style: Gothic and romanesque

The Basilica of Saints Nazarius and Celsus (French: Basilique des Saints Nazaire et Celse) is a Roman Catholic minor basilica located in the citadel of Carcassonne, France. It is a national monument, and is in the Gothic-Romanesque architectural tradition.

== History ==
=== Visigothic church ===
The original church is thought to have been constructed in the 6th century during the reign of Theodoric the Great, ruler of the Visigoths.

=== Cathedral of Carcassonne ===
On 12 June 1096, Pope Urban II visited the town and blessed the building materials for the construction of the cathedral. Construction was completed in the first half of the twelfth century. It was built on the site of a Carolingian cathedral, of which no traces remain. The crypt too, despite its ancient appearance, dates from the new construction.

Around the end of the 13th century, during the rule of kings Philip III, Philip IV, and the episcopates of Pierre de Rochefort and Pierre Rodier, the cathedral was reconstructed in the Gothic style. It remained the cathedral of Carcassonne until 1803, when it lost the title to the present Carcassonne Cathedral (Cathédrale Saint-Michel de Carcassonne).

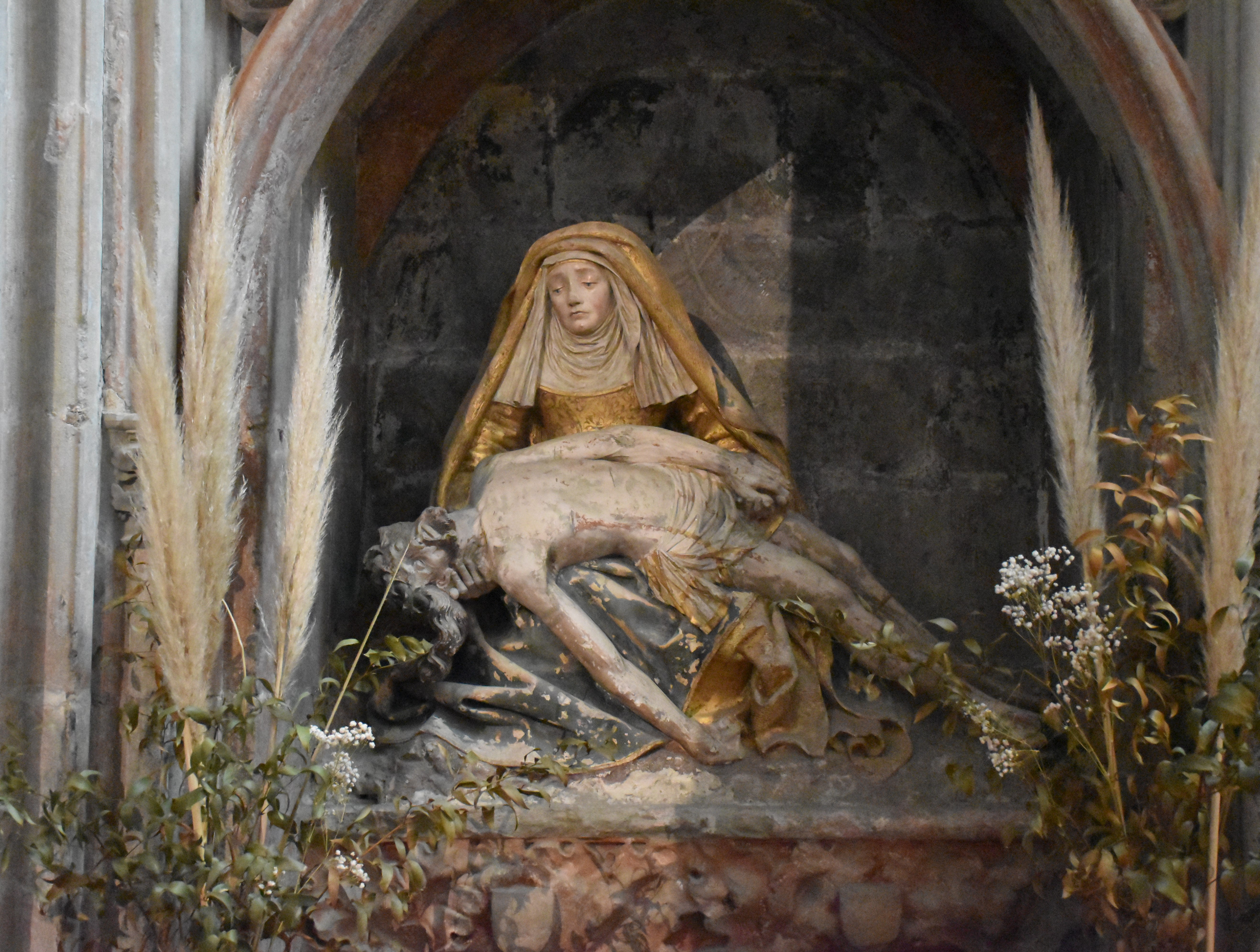
Pieta, painted limestone, circa 1500 (Chapel of Saint Anne)

=== Basilica ===
The Church of Saints Nazarius and Celsus obtained the status of historical monument in 1840. Around this time, the architect Eugène Viollet-le-Duc renovated the church along with the rest of the citadel. In 1898, the church was elevated to a minor basilica.

== Architecture ==
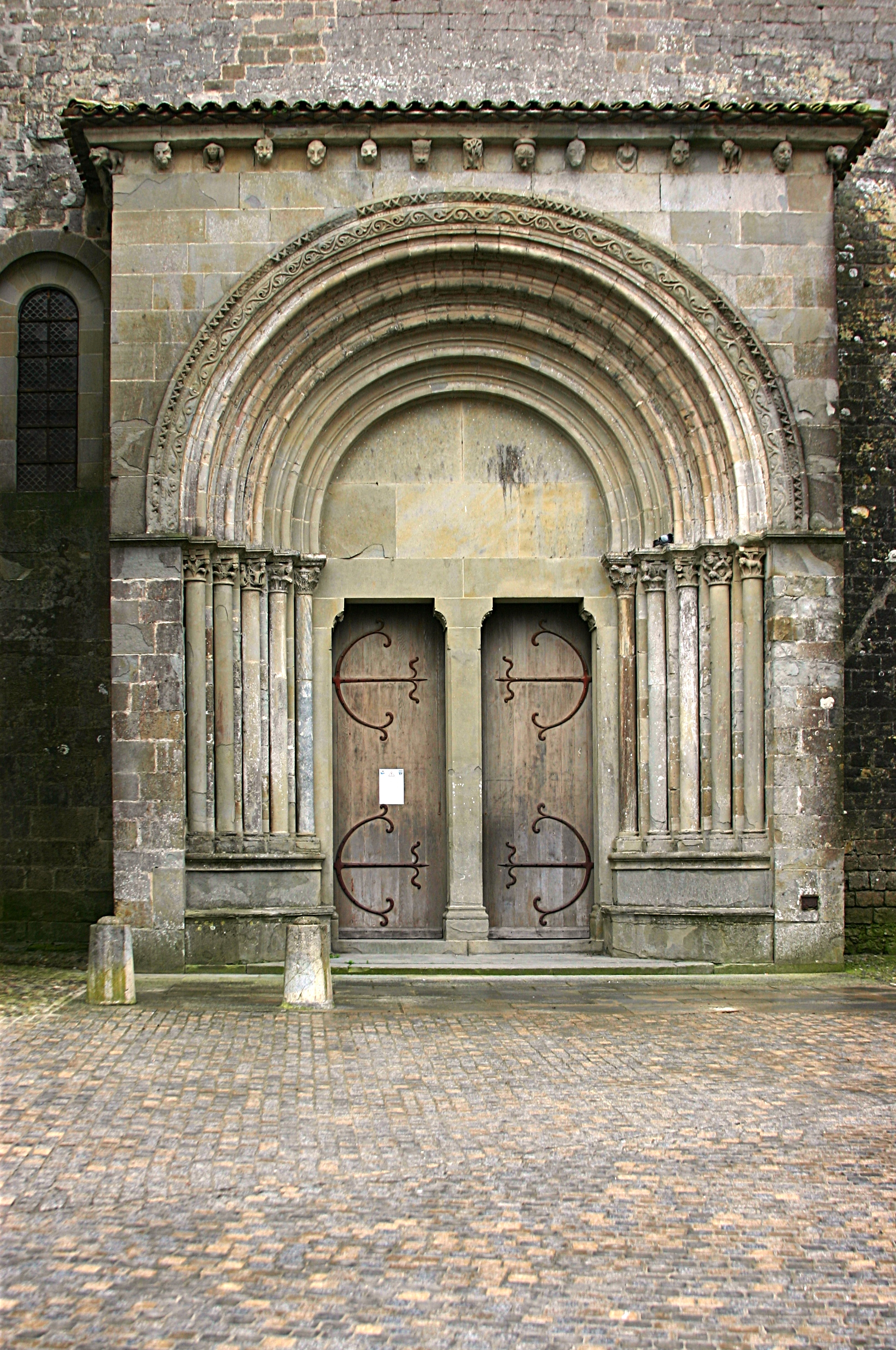
The romanesque entrance in the north façade

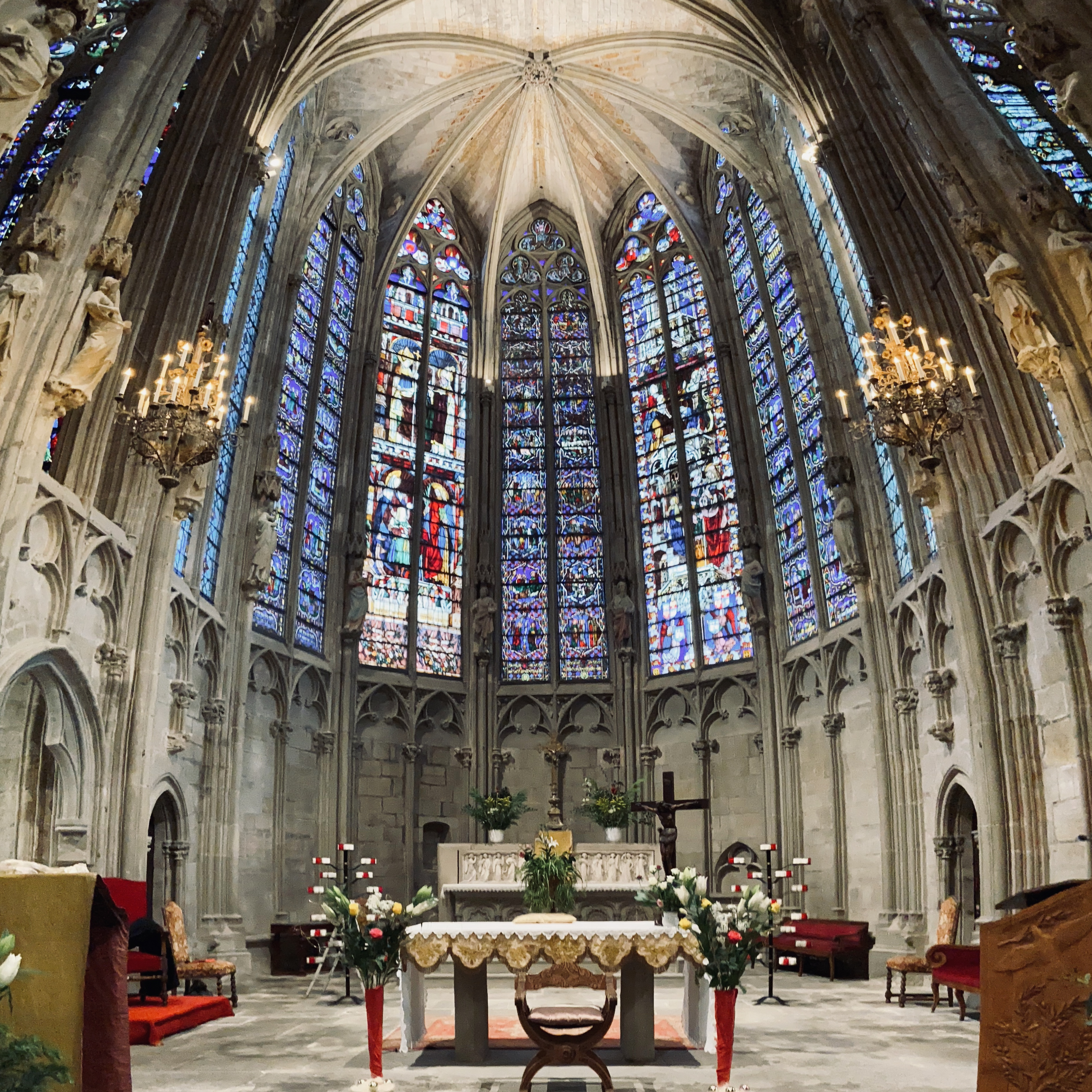
The choir of the basilica in the cité of Carcassonne

The sandstone basilica's floor plan is based on a Latin cross, internally measuring 59 m in total length, 16 m in nave width, and 36 m along the transept. The oldest part of the church is the Romanesque tripartite nave. The main entrance in its north wall is formed by a Romanesque portal of five receding arches over two doors. A fortress façade forms the west wall, as is common for medieval Languedocian church buildings.

The transept and choir were rebuilt in the Gothic style. The larger windows in this part of the church permit a better illumination compared to the darker romanesque nave. The central stained glass window of the choir from 1280 is one of the oldest ones in the south of France. Together with the upper trefoils (the Resurrection of Jesus and the Resurrection of the dead), it depicts the life of Jesus in 16 medallions:

Depictions on the 1280 stained-glass window
Descent from the Cross	Entombment of Jesus
Christ carrying the Cross	Crucifixion of Jesus
Arrest of Jesus	Flagellation of Jesus
Triumphal entry into Jerusalem	Last Supper
Massacre of the Innocents	Christ among the Doctors
Presentation of Jesus at the Temple	Flight into Egypt
Nativity of Jesus	Adoration of the Magi
Annunciation	Visitation

== See also ==
- List of Gothic Cathedrals in Europe
