= Lac de la Cavayère =

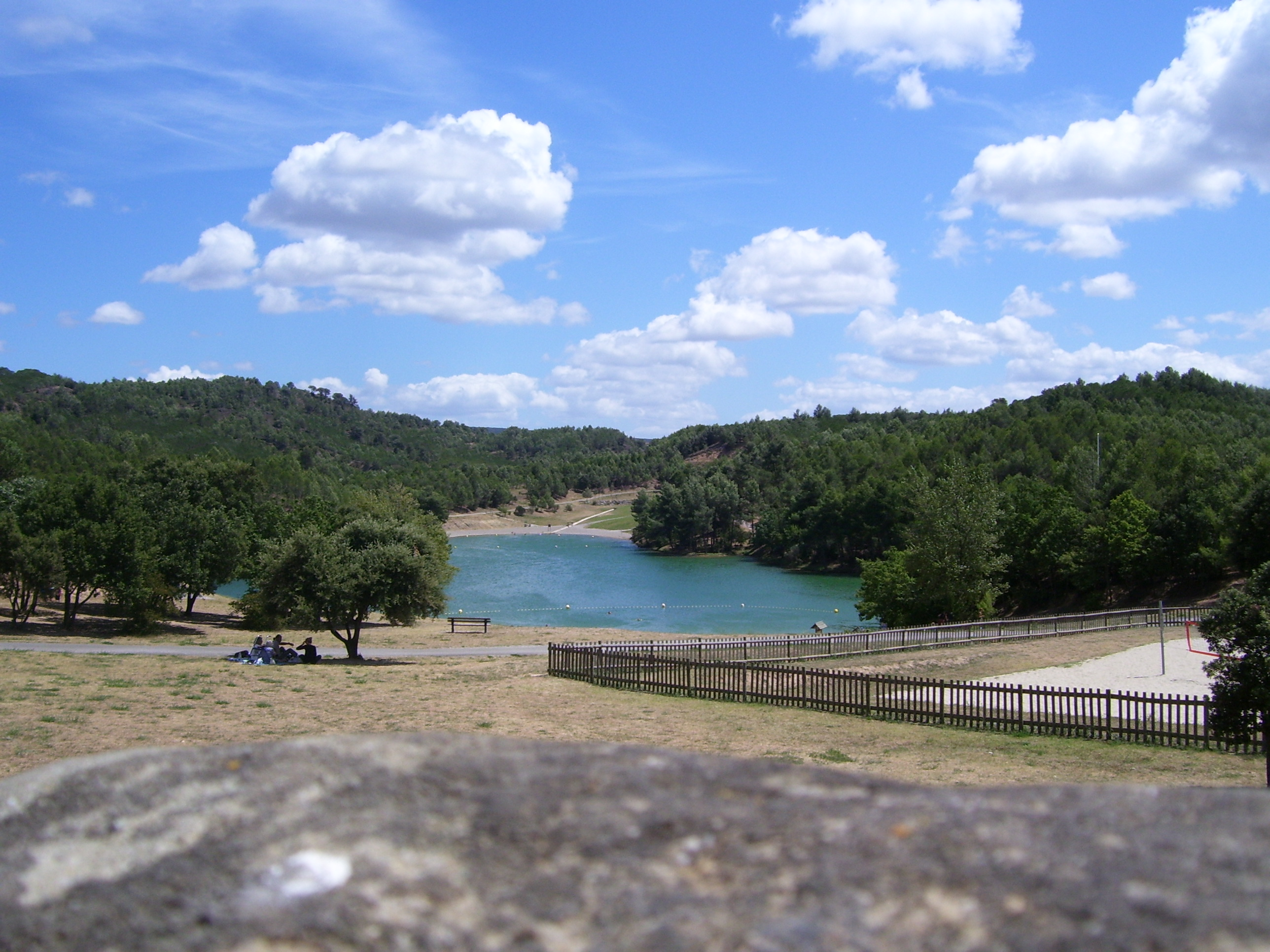

- Location within Occitanie
- Location: Aude
- Coordinates: 43°11′07″N 2°25′10″E
- Type: artificial lake
- Primary inflows: Montirat, Bazalac, Mitgé
- Basin countries: France
- Surface area: 18 ha (44 acres)
- Water volume: 1.5×10^{6} m^{3} (53×10^{6} cu ft)

Lac de la Cavayère is an artificial lake in the Occitanie région of France, close to the medieval town of Carcassonne.

The lake, also known as Carcassonne Plage (in English, Carcassonne Beach), was created by the building of a 23 metre high dam in 1988 after severe forest fires affected the area in 1985. The surface area of the lake, which is fed by the creeks of Montirat, Bazalac and Mitgé, is 180,000 m^{2} and it is 1.5 million cubic metres in volume.

It is a short distance from the town of Carcassonne and has been made into a popular recreation area. Ducks and wildfowl are common and the 400,000 m^{2} surrounding area is notable for a diversity of habitats, flora and fauna.

The beaches slope gently and there are supervised bathing areas. Boats are available for rent and there are picnic areas and a crazy golf course as well as a nearby chateau.

During 2005 the lake was closed to bathing due to strong algal blooms.
