= Carcassonne =

City in Occitania, France

Carcassonne Carcassona (Occitan)
- Prefecture and commune
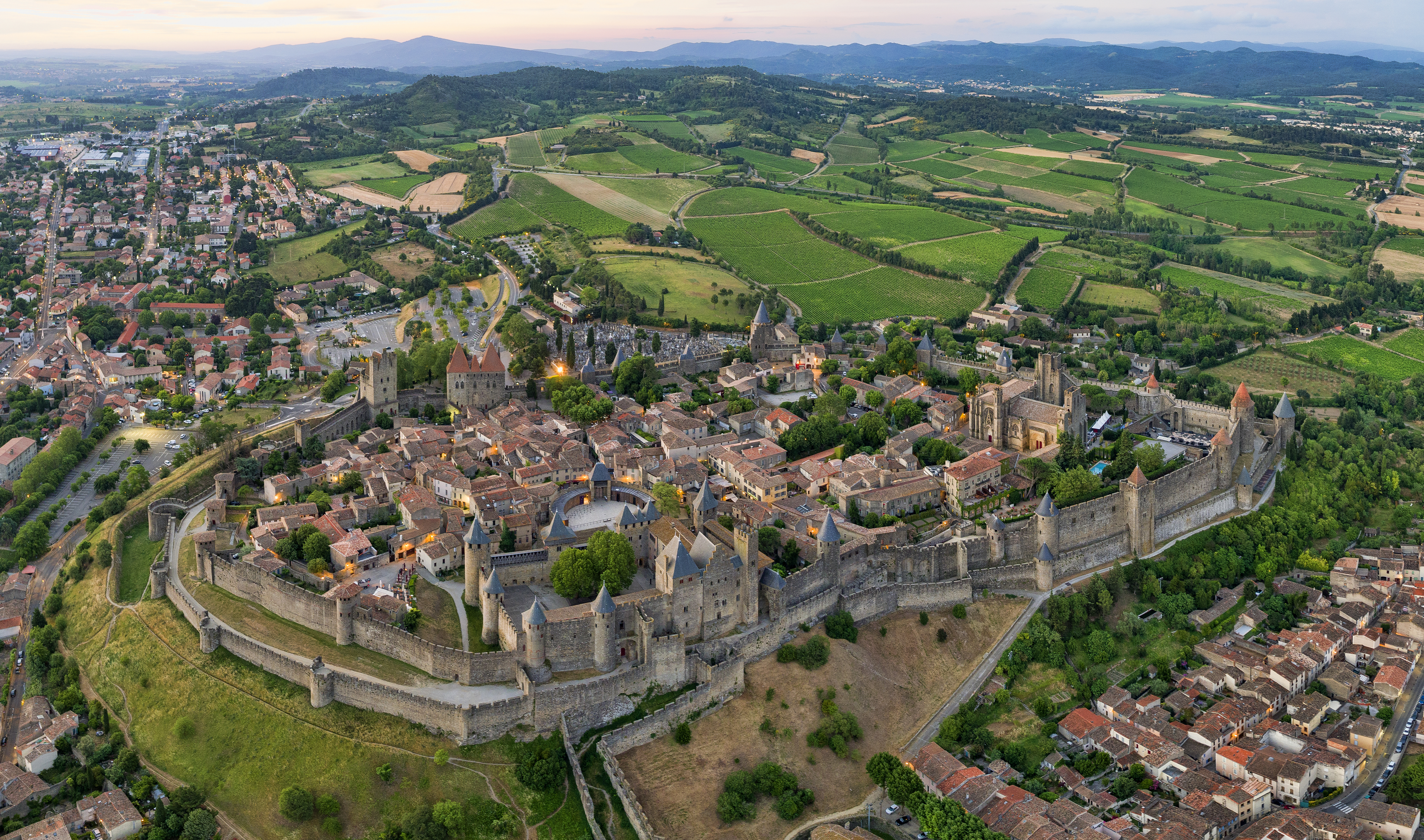
- Aerial photograph of the Cité de Carcassonne

- Coat of arms
- Location of Carcassonne
- Location within France Location within Occitanie
- Coordinates: 43°12′48″N 2°21′03″E
- Country: France
- Region: Occitania
- Department: Aude
- Arrondissement: Carcassonne
- Canton: Carcassonne-1, 2 and 3
- Intercommunality: Carcassonne Agglo

Government
  - Mayor (2026–32): Christophe Barthès (RN)
- Area^{1}: 65.08 km^{2} (25.13 sq mi)
- Elevation: 111 m (364 ft)
- Highest elevation: 250 m (820 ft)
- Lowest elevation: 81 m (266 ft)
- Population (2023): 46,080
  - Density: 708.1/km^{2} (1,834/sq mi)
- Time zone: UTC+01:00 (CET)
  - Summer (DST): UTC+02:00 (CEST)
- INSEE/Postal code: 11069 /11000
- ^{1} French Land Register data, which excludes lakes, ponds, glaciers > 1 km^{2} (0.386 sq mi or 247 acres) and river estuaries.

Carcassonne (Note: /ˌkɑːrkəˈsɒn/ KAR-kə-SON, US also /-ˈsɔːn, -ˈsoʊn/ -SAWN, -SOHN, French: [kaʁkasɔn], locally [kaχkaˈsɔnə]; Occitan: Carcassona [kaɾkaˈsunɔ]; Latin: Carcaso.) is a French city in the department of Aude, region of Occitania. It is the prefecture of the department.

Inhabited since the Neolithic Period, Carcassonne is located in the plain of the Aude between historic trade routes, linking the Atlantic to the Mediterranean Sea and the Massif Central to the Pyrénées. Its strategic importance was quickly recognised by the Romans, who occupied its hilltop until the demise of the Western Roman Empire. In the fifth century, the region of Septimania was taken over by the Visigoths, who founded the city of Carcassonne in the newly established Visigothic Kingdom.

Its citadel, known as the Cité de Carcassonne, is a medieval fortress dating back to the Gallo-Roman period and restored by the theorist and architect Eugène Viollet-le-Duc between 1853 and 1879. It was added to the UNESCO list of World Heritage Sites in 1997 because of the exceptional preservation and restoration of the medieval citadel. Consequently, Carcassonne relies heavily on tourism but also counts manufacturing and winemaking as some of its other key economic sectors.

== History ==
The first signs of settlement in this region have been dated to about 3500 BC, but the hill site of Carsac—a Celtic place-name that has been retained at other sites in the south—became an important trading place in the sixth century BC. The Volcae Tectosages fortified it and made it into an oppidum, a hill fort, which is when it was named "Carsac".

The folk etymology—involving a châtelaine named Lady Carcas, a ruse ending a siege, and the joyous ringing of bells ("Carcas sona")—though memorialized in a neo-Gothic sculpture of Mme. Carcas on a column near the Narbonne Gate, is a modern reconstruction of a 16th-century depiction. The name can be derived as an augmentative of the name Carcas.

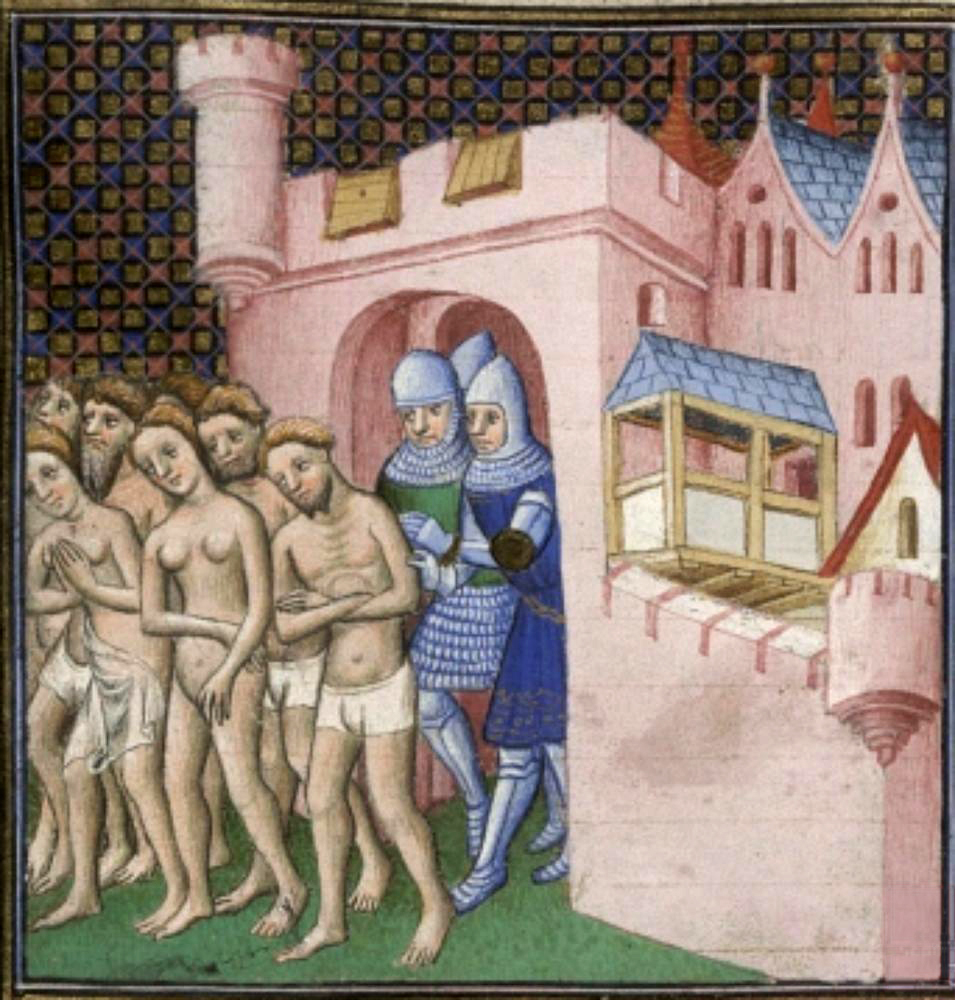
Miniature depicting Cathars being expelled from Carcassonne in 1209

Carcassonne became strategically identified when the Romans fortified the hilltop around 100 BC and eventually made it the colonia of Julia Carsaco, later Carcaso, later Carcasum (by the process of swapping consonants known as metathesis). The main part of the lower courses of the northern ramparts dates from Gallo-Roman times. In AD 462 the Romans officially ceded Septimania to the Visigothic king Theodoric II who had held Carcassonne since AD 453.

Theodoric is thought to have begun the predecessor of the basilica that is now dedicated to Saint Nazaire. In AD 508 the Visigoths successfully foiled attacks by the Frankish king Clovis I. In Francia, the Arab and Berber Muslim forces invaded the region of Septimania in AD 719 and deposed the local Visigothic Kingdom in AD 720; after the Frankish conquest of Narbonne in 759, the Muslim Arabs and Berbers were defeated by the Christian Franks and retreated to Andalusia after 40 years of occupation, and the Carolingian king Pepin the Short came up reinforced.

A medieval fiefdom, the county of Carcassonne, controlled the city and its environs. It was often united with the county of Razès. The origins of Carcassonne as a county probably lie in local representatives of the Visigoths, but the first count known by name is Bello of the time of Charlemagne. Bello founded a dynasty, the Bellonids, which would rule many honores in Septimania and Catalonia for three centuries. In 1067, Carcassonne became the property of Raimond-Bernard Trencavel, viscount of Albi and Nîmes, through his marriage with Ermengard, sister of the last count of Carcassonne. In the following centuries, the Trencavel family allied in succession with either the counts of Barcelona or of Toulouse. They built the Château Comtal and the Basilica of Saints Nazarius and Celsus. In 1096, Pope Urban II blessed the foundation stones of the new cathedral.

Carcassonne became famous for its role in the Albigensian Crusades when the city was a stronghold of Occitan Cathars. In August 1209 the crusading army of the Papal Legate, abbot Arnaud Amalric, besieged the city. Viscount Raymond-Roger de Trencavel was imprisoned while negotiating his city's surrender and died in mysterious circumstances three months later in his dungeon. The people of Carcassonne were allowed to leave—in effect, expelled from their city with nothing more than the shirts on their backs. Simon de Montfort was appointed the new viscount and added to the fortifications.

Expansion of the Frankish Empire

In 1240, Trencavel's son tried unsuccessfully to reconquer his old domain. The city submitted to the rule of the kingdom of France in 1247. Carcassonne became a border fortress between France and the Crown of Aragon under the 1258 Treaty of Corbeil. King Louis IX founded the new part of the town across the river. He and his successor Philip III built the outer ramparts. Contemporary opinion still considered the fortress impregnable. During the Hundred Years' War, Edward the Black Prince failed to take the city in 1355, although his troops destroyed the lower town.

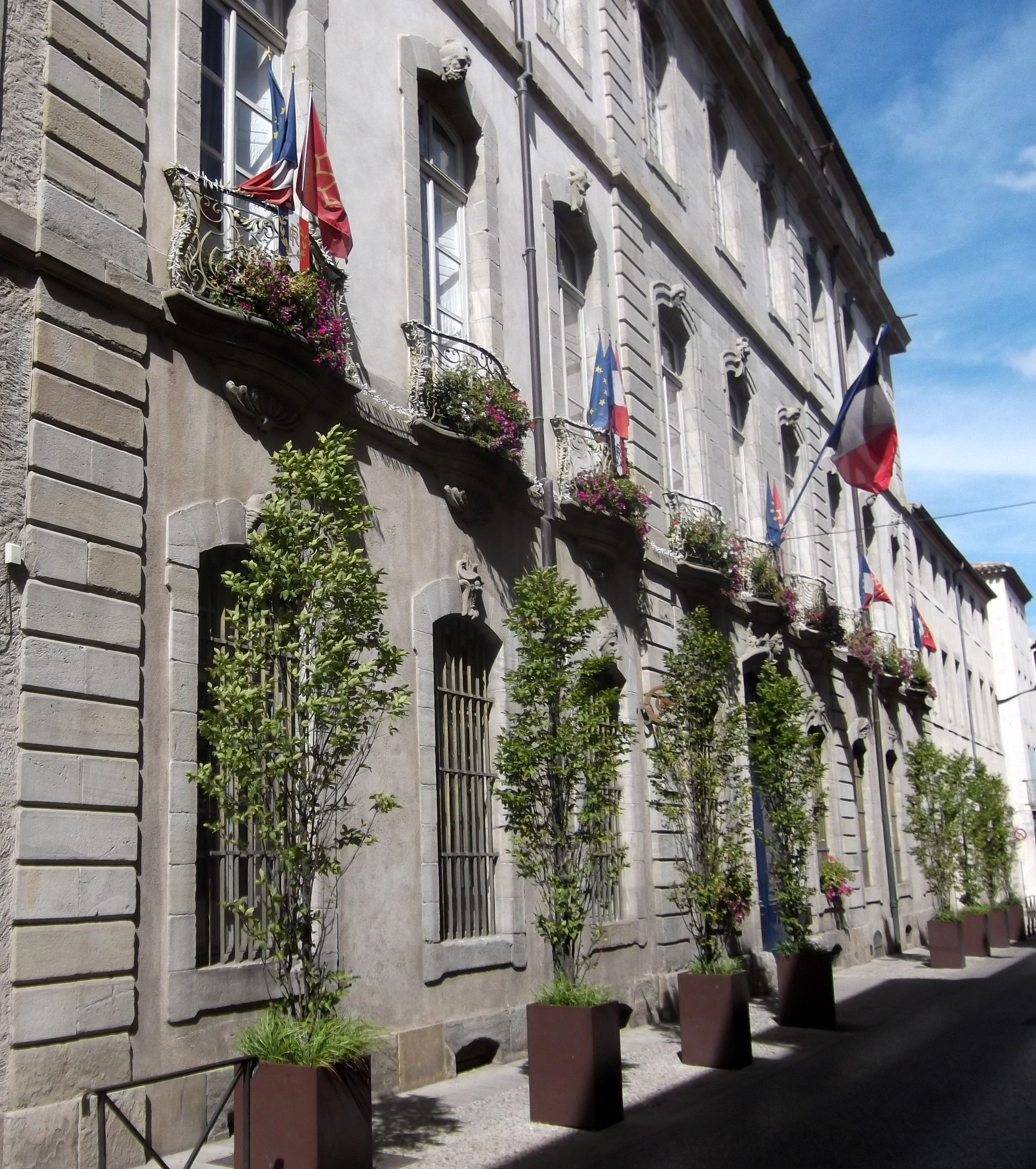
Hôtel de Rolland

In 1659, the Treaty of the Pyrenees transferred the border province of Roussillon to France, and Carcassonne's military significance was reduced. Its fortifications were abandoned and the city became mainly an economic center of the woollen textile industry, for which a 1723 source quoted by Fernand Braudel found it "the manufacturing center of Languedoc". It remained so until the Ottoman market collapsed at the end of the eighteenth century, then reverted to a country town. The town hall, known as Hôtel de Rolland, was completed in 1761.

=== Historical importance ===
During sieges, temporary wooden platforms and walls would be fitted to the upper walls of the fortress through square holes in the face of the wall, providing protection to defenders on the wall and allowing defenders to go out past the wall to drop projectiles on attackers at the wall beneath.

== Geography ==
Carcassonne is located in the south of France about 80 kilometres (50 mi) east of Toulouse. Its strategic location between the Atlantic Ocean and the Mediterranean Sea has been known since the Neolithic era. The town's area is about 65 km^{2} (25 sq mi), which is significantly larger than the numerous small towns in the department of Aude. The rivers Aude, Fresquel, and the Canal du Midi flow through the town.

=== Climate ===
Carcassonne has a humid subtropical climate (Köppen climate classification: Cfa), though with noticeable hot-summer mediterranean climate influence (Köppen climate classification: Csa), a climate which is more typical of southern France, with moderately wet and mild winters coupled with summers averaging above 28 °C (82 °F) during daytime with low rainfall.

Carcassonne, along with the French Mediterranean coastline, can be subject to intense thunderstorms and torrential rains in late summer and early autumn. The Carcassonne region can be flooded in such events, the last of which happened on 14–15 October 2018.

Climate data for Carcassonne (1991–2020 normals, extremes 1948–present)
Month	Jan	Feb	Mar	Apr	May	Jun	Jul	Aug	Sep	Oct	Nov	Dec	Year
Record high °C (°F)	21.1 (70.0)	25.2 (77.4)	27.3 (81.1)	31.3 (88.3)	35.2 (95.4)	40.7 (105.3)	40.2 (104.4)	43.2 (109.8)	36.4 (97.5)	31.9 (89.4)	26.2 (79.2)	22.4 (72.3)	43.2 (109.8)
Mean daily maximum °C (°F)	10.0 (50.0)	11.4 (52.5)	14.9 (58.8)	17.7 (63.9)	21.4 (70.5)	25.9 (78.6)	28.8 (83.8)	28.9 (84.0)	24.8 (76.6)	19.7 (67.5)	13.9 (57.0)	10.7 (51.3)	19.0 (66.2)
Daily mean °C (°F)	6.7 (44.1)	7.5 (45.5)	10.4 (50.7)	12.9 (55.2)	16.5 (61.7)	20.5 (68.9)	23.1 (73.6)	23.1 (73.6)	19.4 (66.9)	15.5 (59.9)	10.4 (50.7)	7.4 (45.3)	14.4 (57.9)
Mean daily minimum °C (°F)	3.5 (38.3)	3.5 (38.3)	5.9 (42.6)	8.1 (46.6)	11.6 (52.9)	15.1 (59.2)	17.3 (63.1)	17.3 (63.1)	14.1 (57.4)	11.3 (52.3)	6.9 (44.4)	4.2 (39.6)	9.9 (49.8)
Record low °C (°F)	−12.5 (9.5)	−15.2 (4.6)	−7.5 (18.5)	−1.6 (29.1)	0.9 (33.6)	6.0 (42.8)	8.4 (47.1)	8.2 (46.8)	2.5 (36.5)	−2.0 (28.4)	−6.8 (19.8)	−12.0 (10.4)	−15.2 (4.6)
Average precipitation mm (inches)	66.0 (2.60)	46.6 (1.83)	58.4 (2.30)	71.4 (2.81)	63.1 (2.48)	46.8 (1.84)	30.1 (1.19)	39.8 (1.57)	48.4 (1.91)	62.7 (2.47)	70.3 (2.77)	61.4 (2.42)	665.0 (26.18)
Average precipitation days (≥ 1.0 mm)	9.5	7.6	7.8	9.3	7.8	5.6	4.6	5.1	5.6	7.2	9.0	8.5	87.7
Average snowy days	2.1	2.1	0.9	0.3	0.0	0.0	0.0	0.0	0.0	0.0	0.6	1.4	7.4
Average relative humidity (%)	82	79	74	74	72	69	64	68	73	80	82	84	75.1
Mean monthly sunshine hours	95.4	121.9	173.8	192.2	220.1	247.8	282.5	267.8	216.0	152.2	104.6	95.2	2,169.5
Source 1: Meteociel
Source 2: Infoclimat.fr (humidity and snowy days, 1961–1990)

== Population ==
Historical population

Year	Pop.	±% p.a.
1793	10,400	—
1800	15,219	+5.59%
1806	14,985	−0.26%
1821	15,752	+0.33%
1831	20,997	+2.92%
1836	22,623	+1.50%
1841	21,333	−1.17%
1846	21,607	+0.26%
1851	20,005	−1.53%
1856	19,915	−0.09%
1861	20,644	+0.72%
1866	22,173	+1.44%
1872	24,407	+1.61%

Year	Pop.	±% p.a.
1876	25,971	+1.56%
1881	27,512	+1.16%
1886	29,330	+1.29%
1891	28,235	−0.76%
1896	29,298	+0.74%
1901	30,720	+0.95%
1906	30,976	+0.17%
1911	30,689	−0.19%
1921	29,314	−0.46%
1926	33,974	+2.99%
1931	34,921	+0.55%
1936	33,441	−0.86%
1946	38,139	+1.32%

Year	Pop.	±% p.a.
1954	37,035	−0.37%
1962	40,897	+1.25%
1968	43,616	+1.08%
1975	42,154	−0.49%
1982	41,153	−0.34%
1990	43,470	+0.69%
1999	43,950	+0.12%
2007	47,620	+1.01%
2012	47,068	−0.23%
2017	46,031	−0.44%
2023	46,080	+0.02%

Source: EHESS and INSEE (1968–2023)

== Economy ==
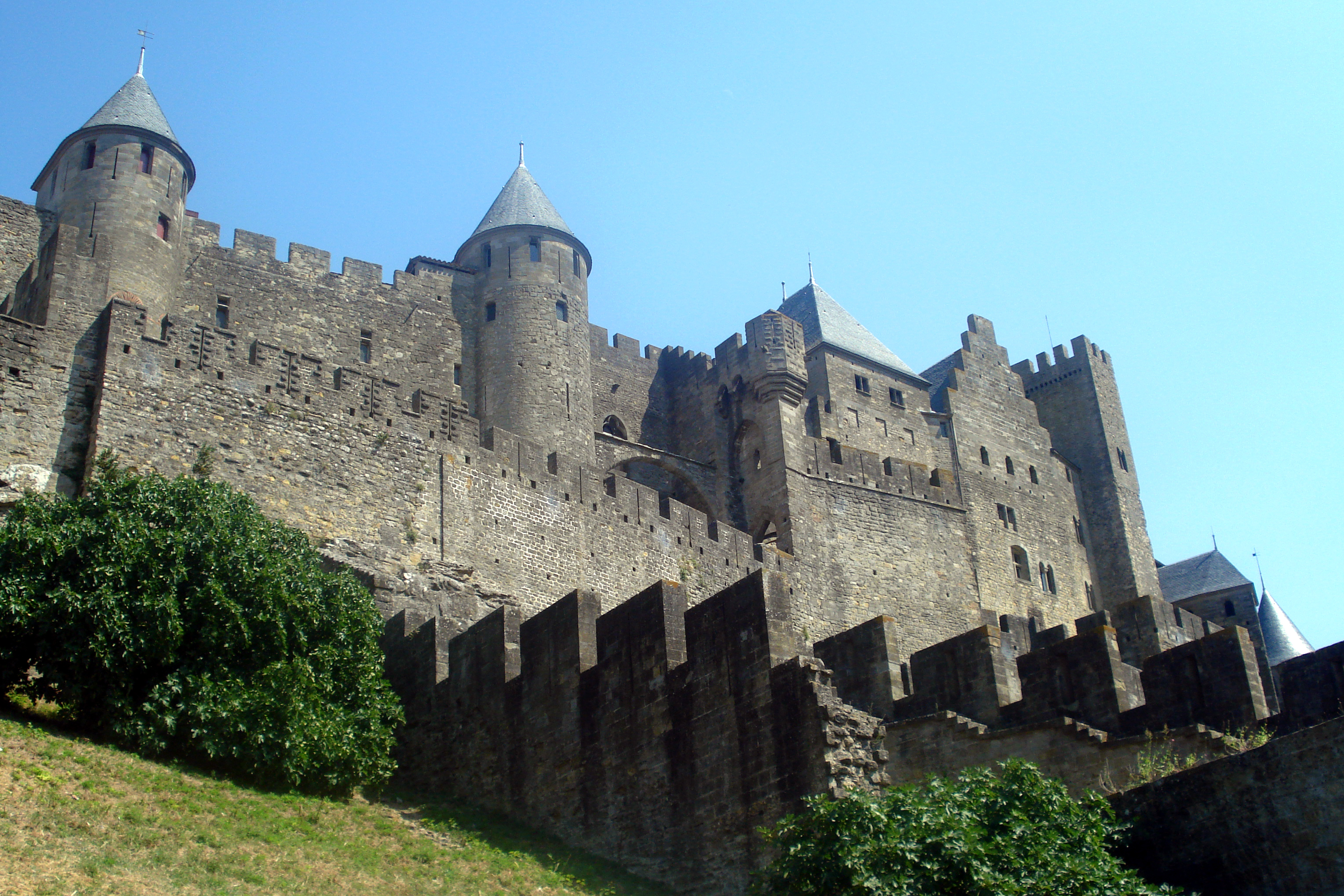
The fortified city wall

The newer part (Ville Basse) of the city on the other side of the Aude river (which dates back to the Middle Ages, after the crusades) manufactures shoes, rubber and textiles. It is also the center of a major AOC winegrowing region. A major part of its income comes from the tourism connected to the fortifications (Cité) and from boats cruising on the Canal du Midi. Carcassonne is also home to the MKE Performing Arts Academy. Carcassonne receives about three million visitors annually.

=== Main sights ===
==== The fortified city ====
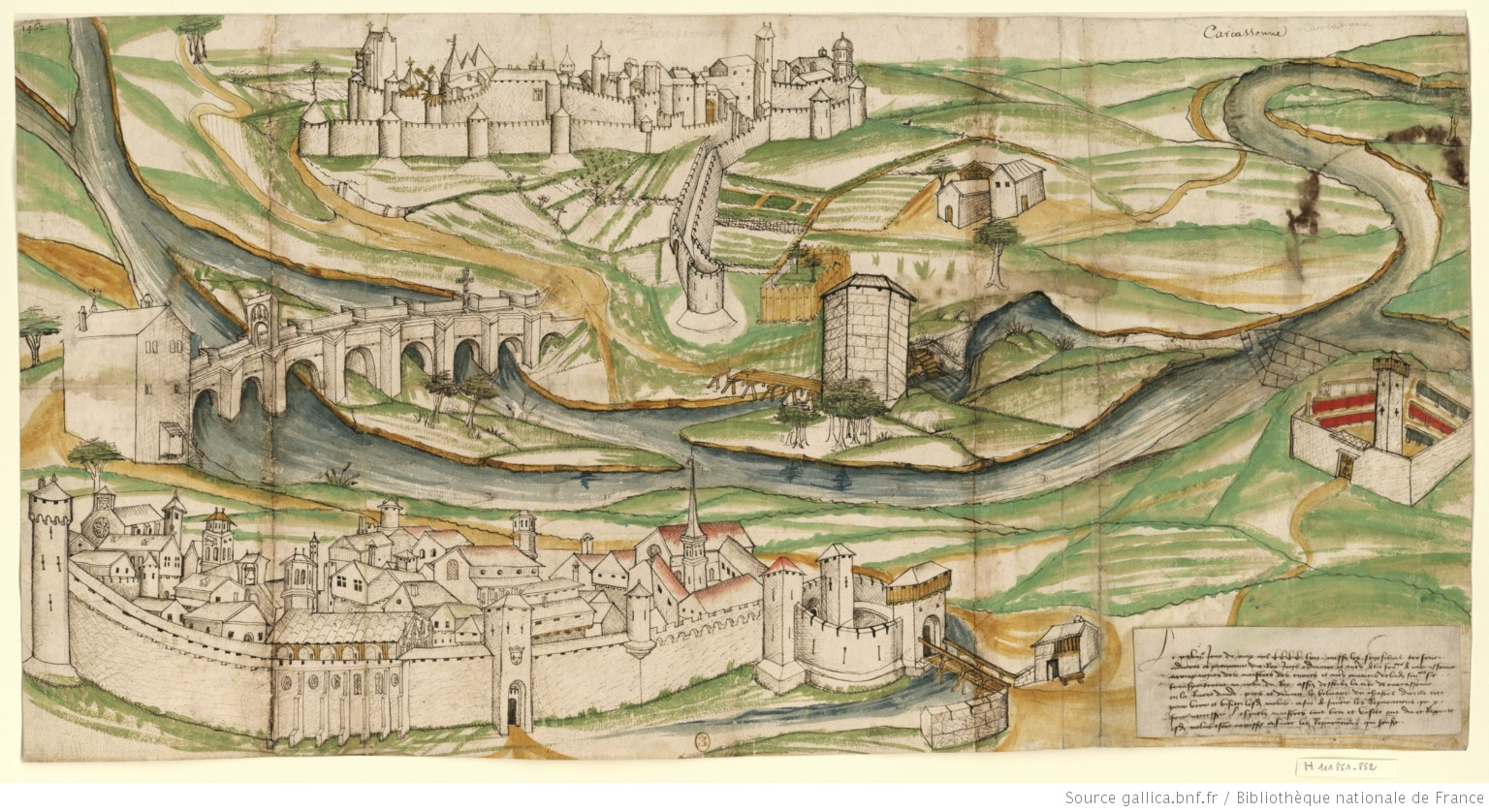
This medieval drawing of Carcassonne from 1462, discovered by Jean-Pierre Cros-Mayrevieille in the Gaignières collection of the Bibliothèque Royale, had a major influence on the project to restore Carcassonne. It reinforced Viollet-le-Duc's idea that all of the towers were topped with conical roof trussing.

The fortified city consists essentially of a concentric design of two outer walls with 52 towers and barbicans to prevent attack by siege engines. The castle itself possesses its own drawbridge and ditch leading to a central keep. The walls consist of towers built over quite a long period. One section is Roman and is notably different from the medieval walls, with the tell-tale red brick layers and the shallow pitch terracotta tile roofs. One of these towers housed the Catholic Inquisition in the 13th century and is still known as "The Inquisition Tower".

Carcassonne was demilitarised under Napoleon Bonaparte and the Restoration, and the fortified cité of Carcassonne fell into such disrepair that the French government decided that it should be demolished. A decree to that effect that was made official in 1849 caused an uproar. The antiquary and mayor of Carcassonne, Jean-Pierre Cros-Mayrevieille, and the writer Prosper Mérimée, the first inspector of ancient monuments, led a campaign to preserve the fortress as a historical monument. Later in the year the architect Eugène Viollet-le-Duc, already at work restoring the Basilica of Saints Nazarius and Celsus, was commissioned to renovate the place.

In 1853, work began with the west and southwest walls, followed by the towers of the porte Narbonnaise and the principal entrance to the cité. The fortifications were consolidated here and there, but the chief attention was paid to restoring the roofing of the towers and the ramparts, where Viollet-le-Duc ordered the destruction of structures that had encroached against the walls, some of them of considerable age. Viollet-le-Duc left copious notes and drawings upon his death in 1879 when his pupil Paul Boeswillwald and, later, the architect Nodet continued the rehabilitation of Carcassonne.

The restoration was strongly criticized during Viollet-le-Duc's lifetime. Fresh from work in the north of France, he made the error of using slate (when there was no slate to be quarried around) instead of terracotta tiles. The slate roofs were claimed to be more typical of northern France, as was the addition of the pointed tips to the roofs.

==== Lower town ====
Lower town across the Aude river

The ville basse dates to the Late Middle Ages. Founded as a settlement of the expelled inhabitants of the town sometime after the crusades, it has been the economic heart of the city for centuries. Though once walled, most of the walls in this portion of the town are no longer intact. The Carcassonne Cathedral is in this part of the town.

==== Other ====
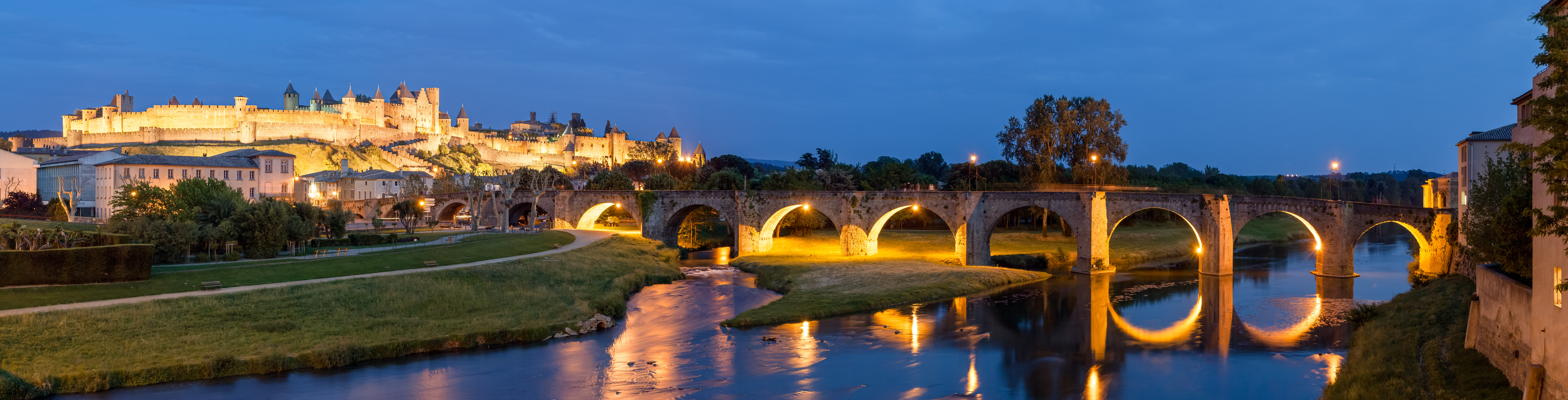
The fortified city of Carcassonne and the Pont Vieux crossing the Aude river

Another bridge, Pont Marengo, crosses the Canal du Midi and provides access to the railway station. The Lac de la Cavayère has been created as a recreational lake; it is about five minutes from the city centre by automobile.

Further sights include:

- The Basilica of Saints Nazarius and Celsus
- The Carcassonne Cathedral
- Church of St. Vincent

=== Transport ===
In the late 1990s, Carcassonne airport started taking budget flights to and from European airports and by 2009 had regular flight connections with Porto, Bournemouth, Cork, Dublin, Frankfurt-Hahn, London-Stansted, Liverpool, East Midlands, Glasgow-Prestwick and Charleroi. The nearest major airport is Toulouse–Blagnac Airport, which is located 105 km (65 mi) north west of Carcassonne. The airport provides most domestic and international destinations.

The Gare de Carcassonne railway station offers direct connections to Toulouse, Narbonne, Perpignan, Paris, Marseille, and several regional destinations. The A61 motorway connects Carcassonne with Toulouse and Narbonne.

== Education ==
- École nationale de l'aviation civile

== Language ==
French is spoken. Historically, the language spoken in Carcassonne and throughout Languedoc-Roussillon was not French but Occitan.

== Sport ==
In July 2025, Carcassonne was the finish city for stage 15 of the Tour de France. Tim Wellens, the 2025 Belgian road race champion, won from a breakaway. This was his first TdF stage win. In July 2021, Carcassonne was the finish city for stage 13, and the starting point of stage 14, of the 2021 Tour de France. It was at the finish in Carcassonne that Mark Cavendish tied the record for most Tour de France stage wins (34) held by Eddy Merckx. Carcassonne was the finish city for stage 15, and the starting point of stage 16, of the 2018 Tour de France. Previously it was the starting point for stage 11 of the 2016 Tour de France, the starting point for a stage in the 2004 Tour de France, and a stage finish in the 2006 Tour de France.

Year	Stage	Start of stage	Stage finish	Distance (km)	Stage winner
1947	13	Montpellier	Carcassonne	172	Lucien Teisseire (FRA)
1947	14	Carcassonne	Luchon	253	Albert Bourlon (FRA)
1951	15	Luchon	Carcassonne	213	André Rosseel (BEL)
1951	16	Carcassonne	Montpellier	192	Hugo Koblet (SUI)
1962	14	Luchon	Carcassonne	215	Jean Stablinski (FRA)
1962	15	Carcassonne	Montpellier	196.5	Willy Vannitsen (BEL)
1981	4	Narbonne	Carcassonne	77	TI–Raleigh–Creda (TTT)
1986	15	Carcassonne	Nîmes	225.5	Frank Hoste (BEL)
2004	14	Carcassonne	Nîmes	192.5	Aitor González (ESP)
2006	12	Luchon	Carcassonne	211.5	Yaroslav Popovych (UKR)
2014	16	Carcassonne	Bagnères-de-Luchon	237.5	Michael Rogers (AUS)
2016	11	Carcassonne	Montpellier	162.5	Peter Sagan (SVK)
2018	15	Millau	Carcassonne	181.5	Magnus Cort Nielsen (DEN)
2018	16	Carcassonne	Bagnères-de-Luchon	218	Julian Alaphilippe (FRA)
2021	13	Nîmes	Carcassonne	219.9	Mark Cavendish (GBR)
2021	14	Carcassonne	Quillan	183.7	Bauke Mollema (NED)
2022	15	Rodez	Carcassonne	202.5	Jasper Philipsen (BEL)
2022	16	Carcassonne	Foix	178.5	Hugo Houle (CAN)
2025	15	Muret	Carcassonne	169.3	Tim Wellens (BEL)
2026	4	Carcassonne	Foix	182.0	Mads Pedersen (DEN)

As in the rest of the southwest of France, rugby union is popular in Carcassonne. The city is represented by Union Sportive Carcassonnaise, known locally simply as USC. The club has a proud history, having played in the French Championship Final in 1925, and currently competes in Pro D2, the second tier of French rugby.

Rugby league is also played, by the AS Carcassonne club. They are involved in the Elite One Championship. Puig Aubert is the most notable rugby league player to come from the Carcassonne club. There is a bronze statue of him outside the Stade Albert Domec at which the city's teams in both codes play.

== Arts ==
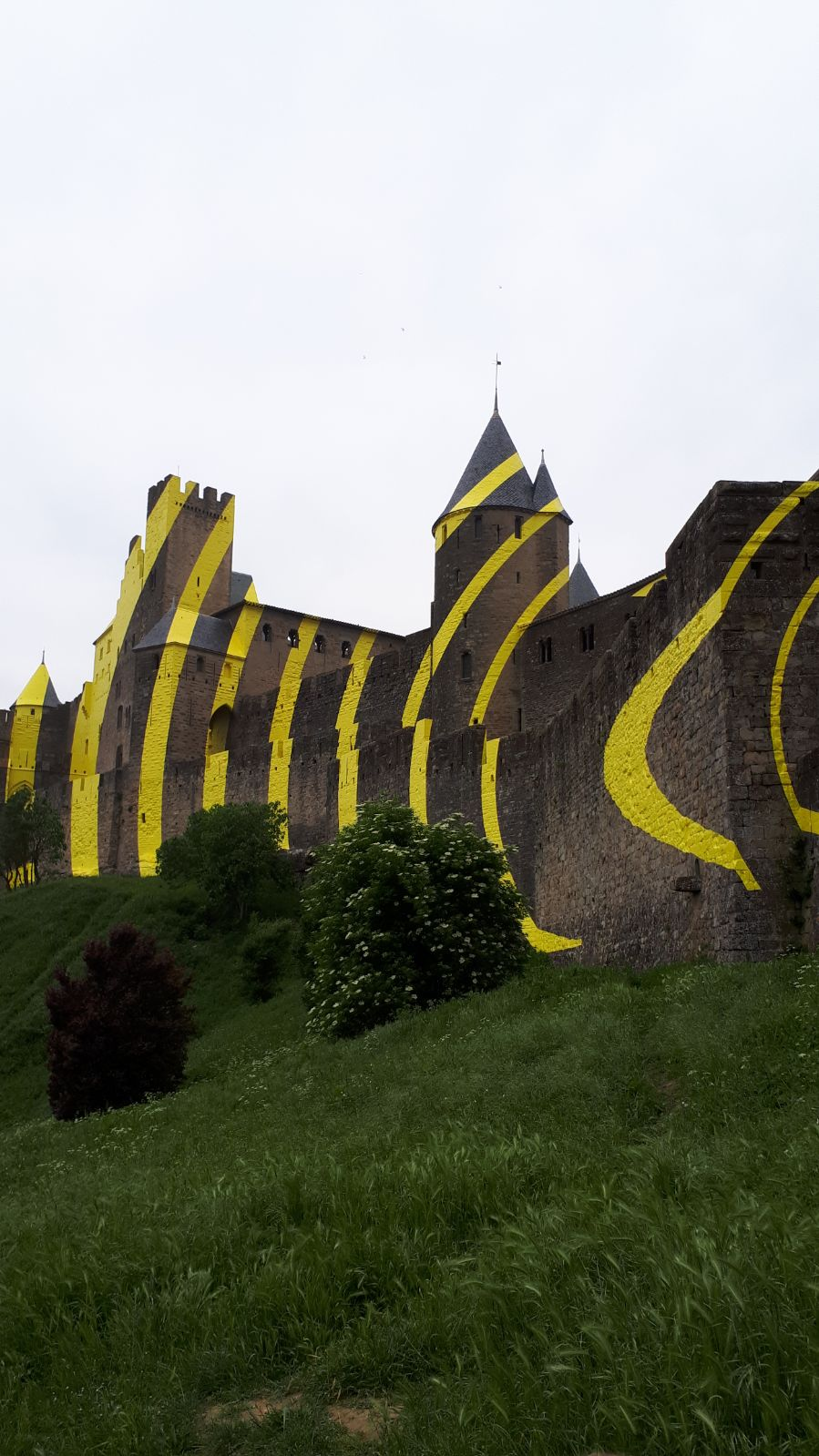
Felice Varini, project "Concentric, eccentric" with concentric yellow circles, at Carcassonne for the 7th "IN SITU, Heritage and contemporary art" event in May 2018 to celebrate the 20th anniversary of the inscription on the World Heritage List of UNESCO

In May 2018, as the project "Concentric, eccentric" by French-Swiss artist Felice Varini, large yellow concentric circles were mounted on the monument as part of the 7th edition of "IN SITU, Heritage and contemporary art", a summer event in the Occitanie / Pyrenees-Mediterranean region focusing on the relationship between modern art and architectural heritage. This monumental work was done to celebrate the 20th anniversary of Carcassonne's inscription on the World Heritage List of UNESCO.

Exceptional in its size and its visibility and use of architectural space, the exhibit extended across the western front of the fortifications of the city. The work could be fully perceived only in front of the Porte d'Aude at the pedestrian route from the Bastide. The circles of yellow colour consist of thin, painted aluminium sheets, spread like waves of time and space, fragmenting and recomposing the geometry of the circles on the towers and curtain walls of the fortifications. The work was visible from May to September 2018 only.

== In culture ==
- The French poet Gustave Nadaud made Carcassonne famous as a city. He wrote a poem about a man who dreamed of seeing but could not see before he died. His poem inspired many others and was translated into English several times. Georges Brassens has sung a musical version of the poem. Lord Dunsany wrote a short story "Carcassonne" (in A Dreamer's Tales) as did William Faulkner.
- On 6 March 2000 France issued a stamp commemorating the fortress of Carcassonne.
- In 2000, the popular board game Carcassonne was released. While exploring the area for inspiration, the creator, Klaus-Jürgen Wrede, "was so impressed by the whole landscape and area surrounding Carcassonne" that he "wanted to build it in a game".
- It was the inspiration for the Call of Duty: Black Ops 6 Zombie Map "Citadelle des Morts" (Citadel of the Dead).
- It was the titular destination in the book Narrow Dog to Carcassonne journalling a couple's trip from England to the Mediterranean coast of France aboard their 60 foot (18.3 meters) narrowboat.

== People ==
- Bernard Barillot, French painter and calligraphist, b. 1949
- Théophile Barrau, French sculptor, b. 1848
- Gilbert Benausse, French rugby league footballer, b. 1932
- Alain Colmerauer, French computer scientist, inventor of the programming language Prolog, b. 1941
- Henry d'Estienne, French painter, b. 1872
- Fabrice Estebanez, French rugby union player, b. 1981
- David Ferriol, French rugby league player, b. 1979
- Paul Lacombe, French composer, b. 1837
- Michael Martchenko, French-born Canadian illustrator, b. 1942
- Olivia Ruiz, French pop singer, b. 1980
- Paul Sabatier, French chemist, co-recipient of the Nobel Prize in Chemistry, b. 1854
- Maurice Sarrail, French soldier, General of Division during the First World War, b. 1856
- Suzanne Sarroca, French operatic soprano, b. 1927

== International relations ==
Carcassonne is twinned with:

- Eggenfelden, Germany
- Baeza, Spain
- Tallinn, Estonia
- Jaisalmer, India
