= Hôtel de Rolland =

Town hall in Carcassonne, France

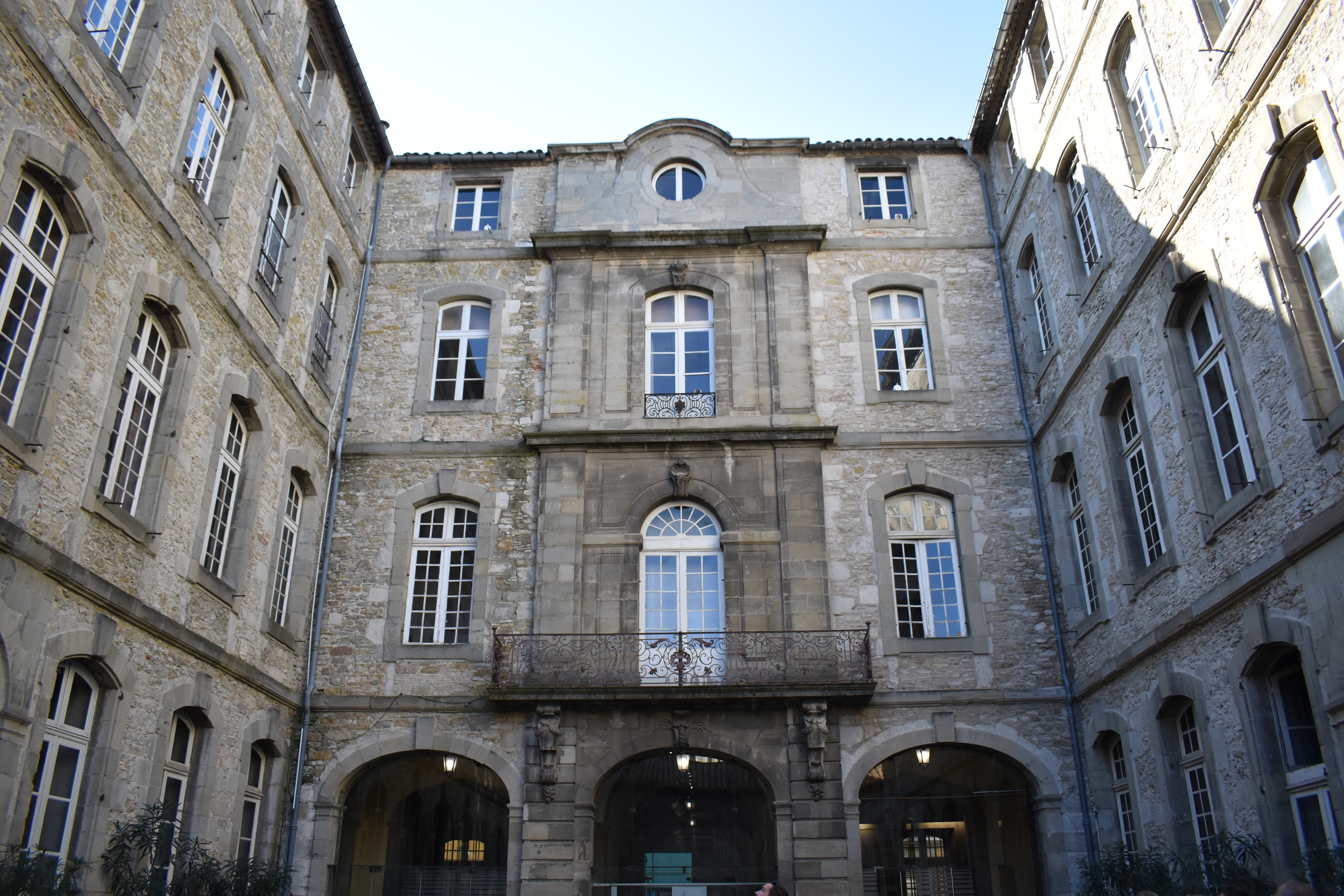
- The courtyard of Hôtel de Rolland in September 2022

General information
- Type: City hall
- Architectural style: Neoclassical style
- Location: Carcassonne, France
- Coordinates: 43.2120°N 2.3530°E
- Completed: 1761

Design and construction
- Architect: Guillaume Rollin

Monument historique
- Official name: Hôtel de Rolland
- Type: Inscrit
- Designated: 1923
- Reference no.: PA00102601

The Hôtel de Rolland (French pronunciation: [otɛl də vil], City Hall) is a municipal building in Carcassonne, Aude, in southern France, standing on Rue Aimé Ramond. It was designated a monument historique by the French government in 1923.

== History ==
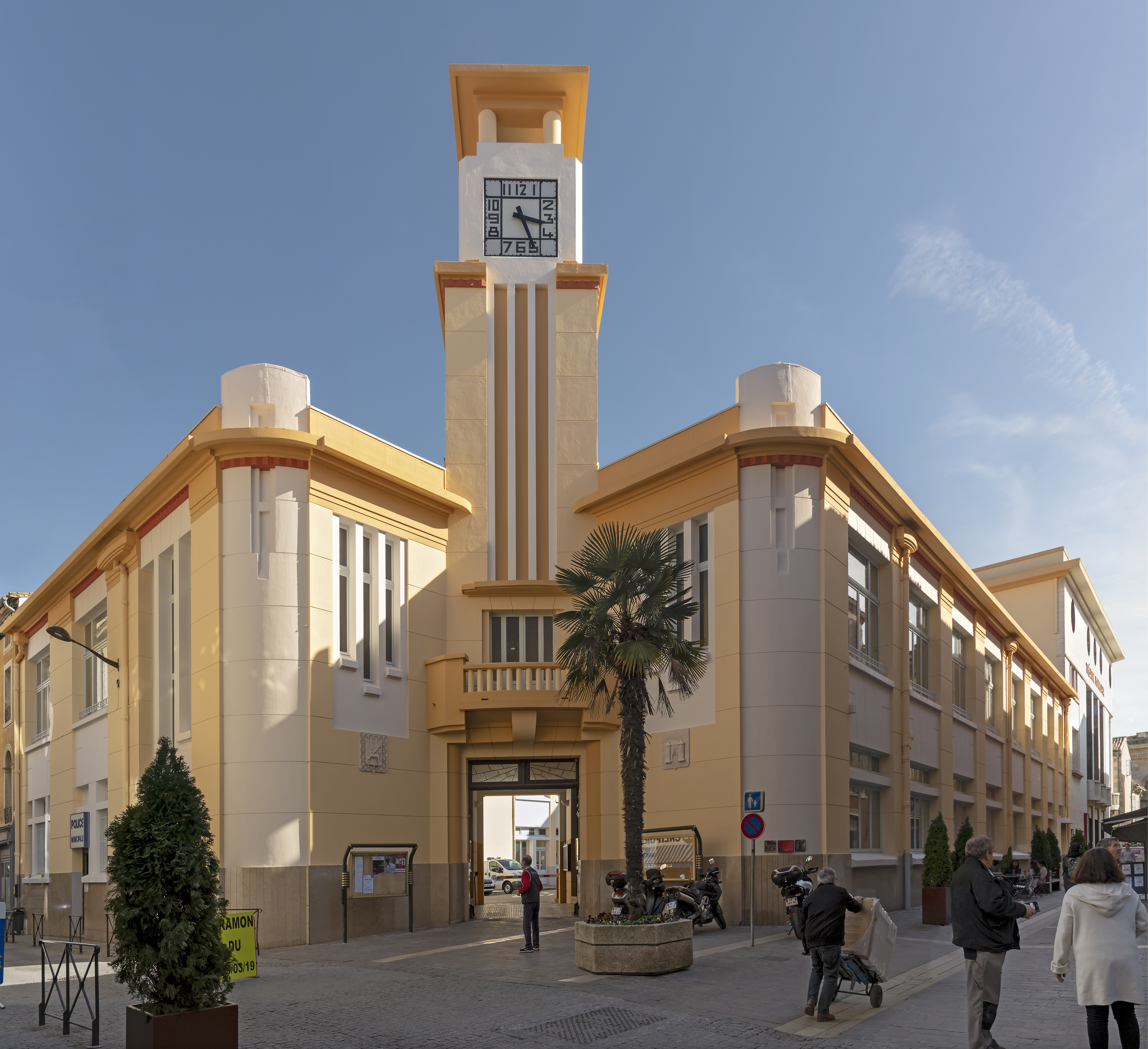
The third town hall

The first town hall, which was at No. 50 Rue Barbès, dated from the 13th century. After the first town hall was burnt down in September 1434, the consuls moved to the second town hall, known as the Maison Consulaire, which was on the corner of Rue des Orfèvres (now Rue Courtejaire) and Rue de la Pélisserie (now Rue Aimé Ramond). It was laid out around a courtyard with a forestair on the left, a main frontage at the back of the courtyard, and an arcade on the right. The main frontage featured three openings on the ground floor, a round headed window on the first floor and a pediment above. A small bell tower was added in March 1661, and a sculpture of figure known as "La jeune captive" was created by Pierre Hébert and installed in an alcove under the forestair in 1859.

By the 1930s, the second town hall was too small and the council led by the mayor, Albert Tomey, decided to demolish it and to erect a new building, the third town hall, on the same site. The new building was designed by the municipal architect, Jean Blanchard, in the Art Deco style, built by a local contractor, Noël Cazanave, in stone and was officially opened on 1 July 1936. It featured a square headed opening on the ground floor, a French door and a balcony on the first floor, and prominent square-shaped clock tower above, on the corner of Rue Courtejaire and Rue Aimé Ramond. After passing through the opening, and the concierge's office on the left, a marble staircase provided access to the Salle du Conseil (council chamber) and the Salle des Mariages (wedding room). Both these rooms are still in use for their original purpose.

During the Second World War, the politician, Lucien Villa, who was active in the French Resistance, was arrested in September 1942, interrogated in the town hall and sentenced to 18 months in a prison in Villeneuve-sur-Lot.

In the early 1970s, the council, led by the mayor, Antoine Gayraud, decided to acquire an additional building to accommodate the offices of council officers and their staff. The building they selected was Hôtel de Rolland located a few yards to the east on the north side of Rue Aimé Ramond. The building had been commissioned by Jean-François Cavaillès, who was the son of a local merchant, in the mid-18th century. Construction of the new building started in 1751. It was designed by Guillaume Rollin in the neoclassical style, built in rubble masonry and was completed in 1761. In 1815, the building was acquired by a lawyer, Antoine Joseph Gérard de Rolland du Roquan. It passed down the Rolland family until it was bought by Crédit Agricole in 1924 and then by the council in 1978.

The building was laid out as a Hôtel particulier around a courtyard, which opened out onto Ruelle Rolland, a narrow lane parallel and to the north of Rue Aimé Ramond. The design involved a four-storey main frontage at the back of the courtyard and four-storey wings on either side. The main frontage featured three round headed openings on the ground floor, a French door with a balcony on the first floor, a segmental headed window on the second floor and an oculus on the third floor. All the other bays were fenestrated by segmental headed windows. Works of art in the building included a painting by Antoine Guillemet depicting the Cité de Carcassonne.
