= Bernard Barillot =

French painter

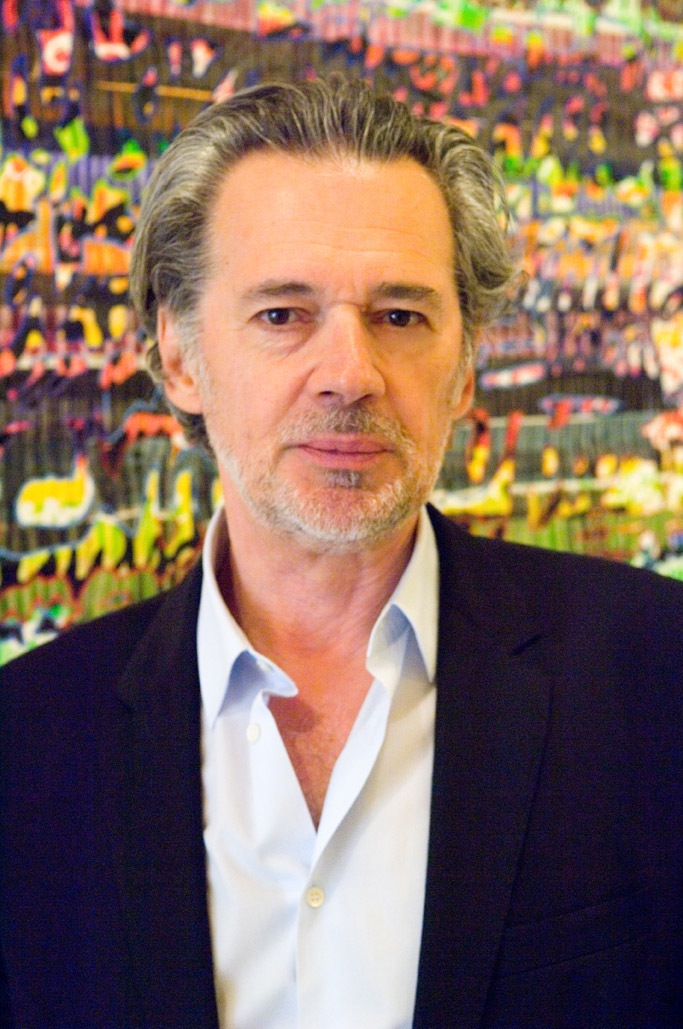
Barillot in 2014

Bernard Barillot (French: [bɛʁnaʁ baʁijo]; born 4 October 1949) is a French painter and calligraphist.

== Biography ==
Barillot was born on 4 October 1949 in Carcassonne. After high school in Carcassonne, he entered the Toulouse School of Fine arts in September 1967. He studied under Claude Chaigneau and Jacques Fauché. He also attended Michel Goedgebuer's lithography and silk screen printing art studio.

He finished his studies in 1974 and was awarded the "Grand prix of the town of Toulouse".

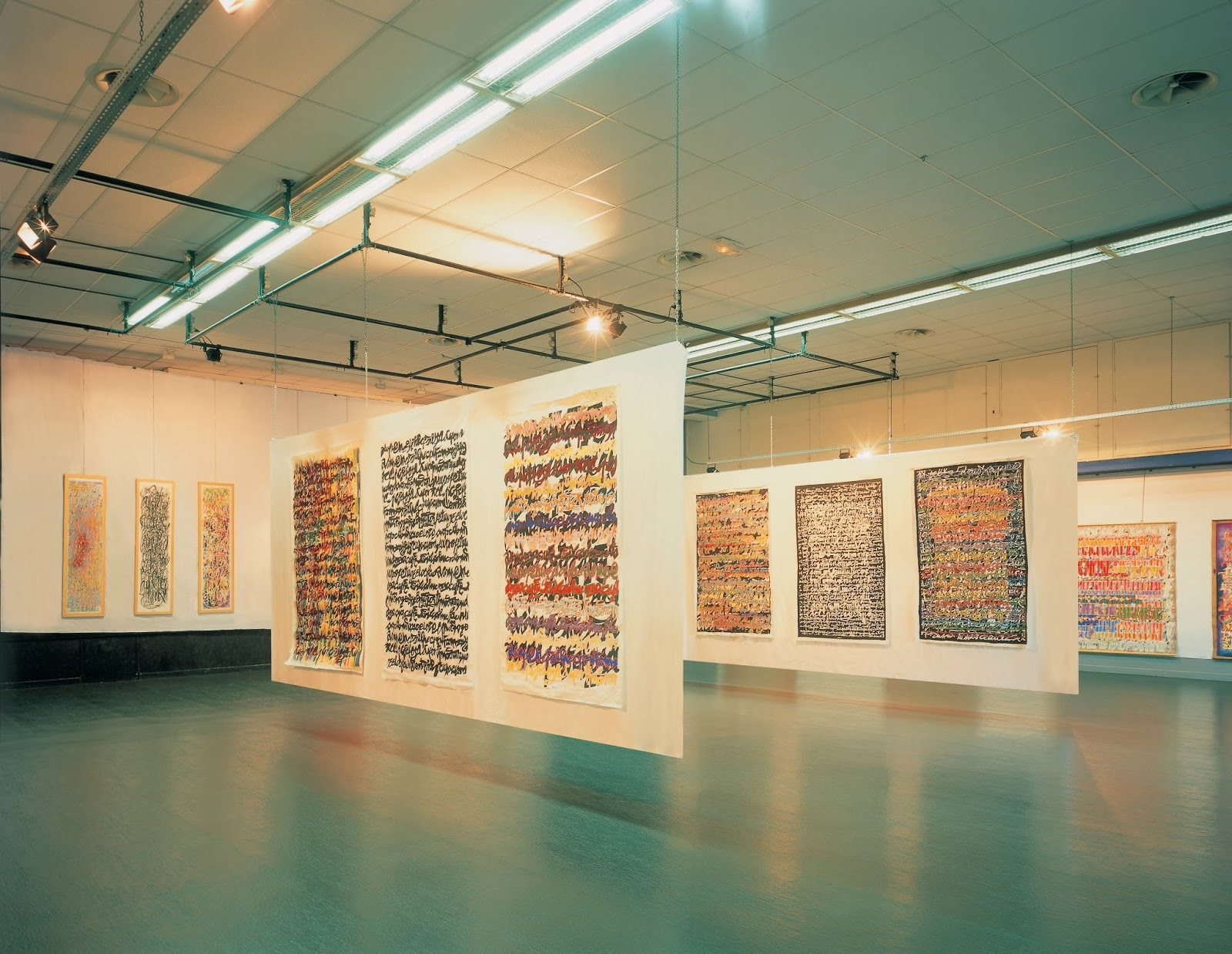
Exposition of Bernard Barillot

After much research, BB was busy with bind writing, calligraphy and painting. Sign, Letter and Graphic became obsessional for him. "The deep mysterious drawing of graphic signs and their powerful evocation draw attract and captivate the attention by means of sensitivity. The plan carries the image slowly, with the fragility of time passing space" writes Bernard Barillot in his book of artist "The song of the sign".

As soon as he had finished at the School of Fine Arts, Bernard Barillot held multiple exhibitions, first in France and then abroad. In 1984 Barillot took part in the exhibition "L'abstraction au carré" ('the abstraction squared') about the Larzac with Pierre Soulages, André Marfaing, Charles Pierre Bru, Albert Ayme, Jacques Fauché. He was then invited in residence with Kodama Maria Borges in Marrakesh, April 1999. The creation of a first work followed: "L'Ecriture hors limites" ('writing off limits').

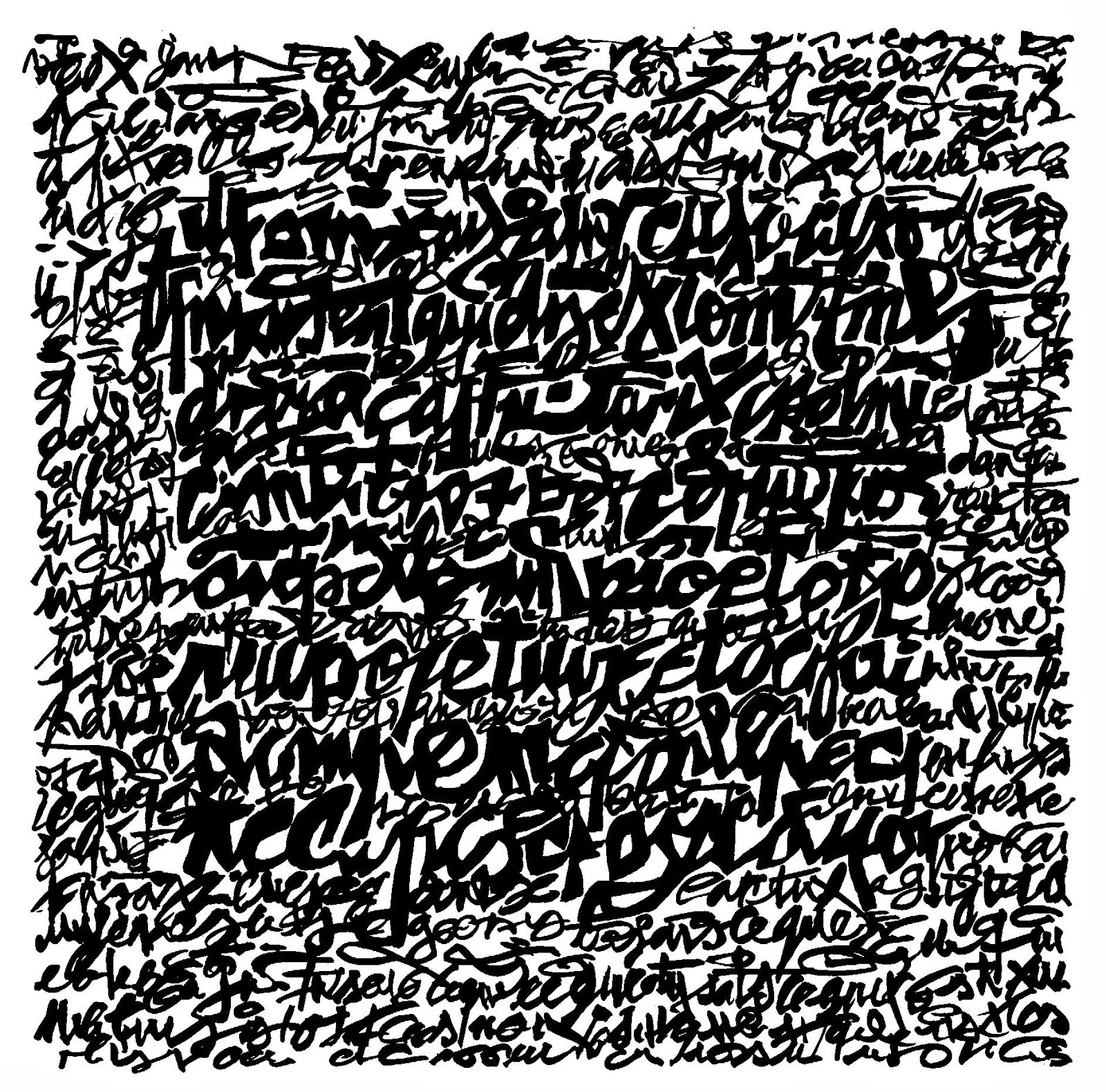
Chinese ink on paper

In 1999 he was the guest artist at the Book Fair of Bordeaux. On this occasion, the art critic Jean-Luc Chalumeau gave a conference in the Center of Contemporary Visual Arts (CAPC). He has just prefaced a catalog on his work, “Bernard Barillot, le devenir de l'oeuvre” ("Bernard Barillot, the future of the work"). Two other works followed, the first prefaced by the art critic Gérard-Georges Lemaire. The next one an artistic book entitled "The song of the sign", entirely printed in 18 colour silk screen printing, with a poem by Serge Pey especially written for the artist "L'écriture qui ne se lit pas", "The writing which is not read".

Several other writers, artists, journalists, write texts that accompany his works, Marie Didier, Jean Pierre Mader, Eric Carriere, Helen Ling, Alain Monnier, Marie Paule Peyronnet. Very early in June 2002, Bernard Barillot meets and presents his work to Pierre Restany, Campagne Première street in Paris, the art critic wishes to follow his approach that he finds interesting.

Unfortunately a second meeting would not take place, Pierre Restany dies practically one year later to the day. Very touched by all these texts, the artist will collect them surrounded by reproductions of some of his works of different formats, watercolors, pastels, acrylics, in a reasoned catalog so the publication will take place in spring 2019.

Barillot regularly shows his work in San Francisco in the United States.

== Main events ==
- 1974: Gallery DALBA2 in Toulouse
- 1978: Cultural centre of the town Toulouse
- 1995: Cultural centre Saint Jérôme in Toulouse
- 1995: Gallery Simone BOUDET in Toulouse
- 1997: Gallery Simone BOUDET in Toulouse
- 1999: Museum of Marrakesh
- 1999: Book fair in Bordeaux
- 2001: Museum André ABBAL in Carbonne
- 2006: Abbey of Beaulieu in Ginals
- 2007: Church Saint-Étienne in Beaugency
- 2009: Gallery Tiny FACTORY in Toulouse
- 2013: Espace 3 in Sarlat-la-Canedat
- 2013: Gallery Tiny FACTORY in Toulouse
- 2014: Legal Office in Paris
- 2015: Calligraphy for the Stéphane Hessel high school in Toulouse
- 2016: Catholic Institute of Toulouse
