= Léon Barillot =

French painter and engraver

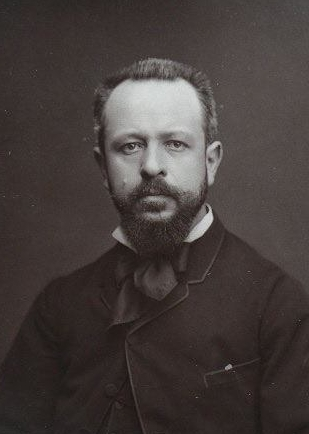
Léon Barillot; photograph by Étienne Carjat

Léon Barillot (French: [leɔ̃ baʁijo]; 11 October 1844, Montigny-lès-Metz - 8 February 1929, Paris) was a French painter and engraver. He specialized in animals and landscapes.

== Biography ==
His father owned a wallpaper factory, where he worked as a pattern designer. On the advice of Auguste Migette, a local painter and designer, he went to Paris to continue his artistic studies in the workshops of Léon Bonnat at the École nationale supérieure des beaux-arts.

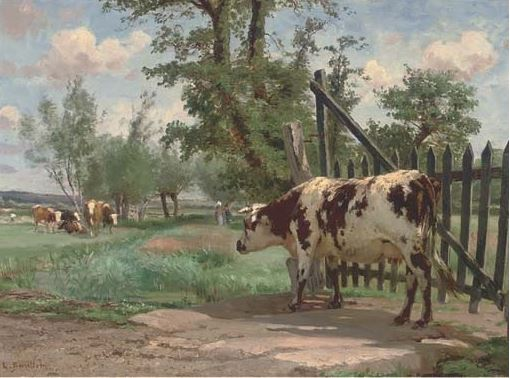
Cows in a Water-meadow

He returned to Metz at the beginning of the Franco-Prussian War and remained there during the ensuing siege. After the Commune, he went back to Paris. At that time, he created numerous engravings and etchings for the publishing firm of Alfred Cadart, among others; notably, an album called L'Illustration nouvelle and the series, L'Eau forte en....

In 1872, following the annexation of his hometown by the Germans, he chose French citizenship, settled permanently in Paris and opened a studio near the Opera. He was awarded medals at the Salon in 1880 and 1884. He also exhibited and won awards in London and Melbourne. At the Exposition Universelle (1889), he received a gold medal. He was known for painting en plein aire. His favorite places were along the Seine, in Sologne and in Charolais, home to several popular breeds of cattle and sheep.

His last major award was Grand Prize at the Exposition internationale et coloniale (1894) in Lyon. The following year, he was named a Chevalier in the Legion of Honor.

He died in Paris and was interred at the Cimetière du Montparnasse.
