= Andalusian campaign (1133) =

1133 invasion of Al-Andalus by Leon

- Part of Reconquista
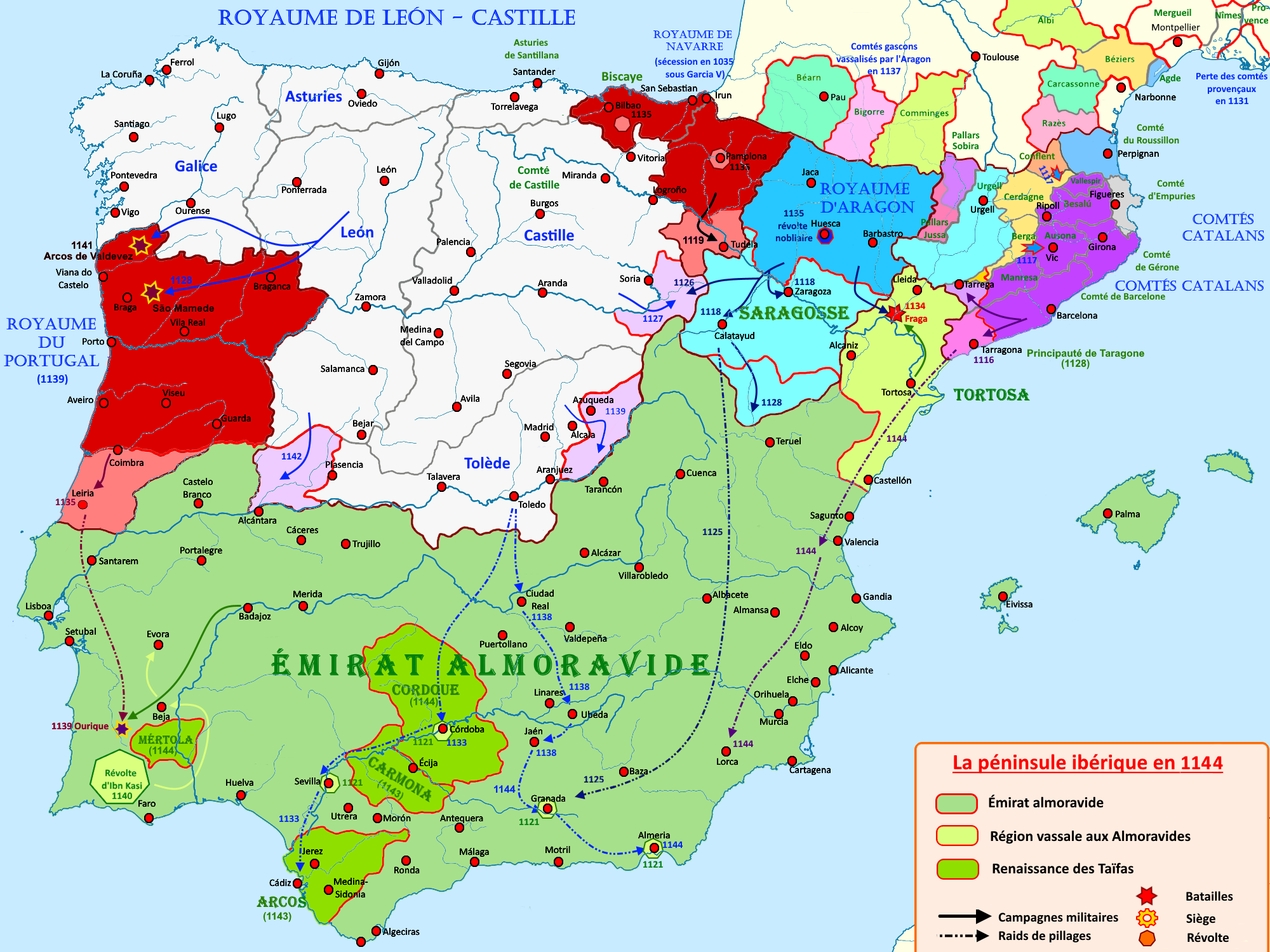
- Map of the Iberian Peninsula in 1144, showing the Andalusian campaign
Date	January–September 1133
Location	Al-Andalus
Result	Leonese–Castilian victory

Belligerents
Kingdom of Leon; Kingdom of Castile	Almoravids

Commanders and leaders
Alfonso VII; Zafadola; Rodrigo González de Lara	Unknown

Strength
Unknown	Low

Casualties and losses
None or low	Unknown

The Andalusian campaign in 1133 was led by Alfonso VII of León and Castile with the support of Zafadola, also known as "Sayf al-Dawla", and Rodrigo González de Lara. The campaign was a success, although Alfonso did not permanently occupy any cities or territory.

== Background ==
In 1130, the Almoravids entered the Kingdom of Toledo and captured Aceca, killing and imprisoning all the Christians they found including its governor, Tello Fernández. Three years later, Alfonso VII of León held a council proposing a campaign in Almoravid territory to avenge the Aceca attack and others that had been carried out in previous years. All those present agreed with the king and, in that same year, he began his campaign accompanied by Zafadola and Rodrigo González de Lara.

== Campaign ==
Alfonso's army consisted of many horsemen, archers and infantry. In September 1133, Alfonso left Toledo and crossed the Guadalquivir, where he divided his army into two units: one commanded by him and the other commanded by Rodrigo González de Lara probably because they did not have enough water for everyone.

Alfonso and his force went through Portus Regis while Rodrigo González and his force traveled through the Despeñaperros pass. After two weeks, both armies joined back together at the castle of Gallello, near Santa Elena, where they found enough food for the armies including the horses.

The Castilian army plundered the territories of Córdoba, Carmona and Seville, although they did not occupy any of the cities. Alfonso burned the crops and cut down the olive trees and vineyards as it was harvest time. In those territories his army attacked additional cities, looting and taking captives. Alfonso then headed for Jerez de la Frontera and Cádiz, which he would occupy for a while until he sacked them and moved on. The Almoravids put up little resistance and made little effort to stop the raiding army. Alfonso and the Castilian force returned home passing through Talavera reaching Toledo in September of the same year.

== Aftermath ==
This campaign proved to be a complete success. Alfonso started another campaign in 1138, where he would plunder the lands of Jaén, Úbeda, Baeza and Andújar. Between 1146 and 1147, Alfonso besieged Córdoba and conquered Almería.
