= William VI of Montpellier =

Occitan noble

William VI or Guillem VI (died 1161) was the eldest son of William V and his wife Ermessende, daughter of Count Peter I of Melgueil. William succeeded his father in the lordship of Montpellier in 1121, while still a minor, under his mother's guardianship. He suppressed a revolt of the bourgeoisie in 1143 and participated in several military campaigns of the Reconquista in Spain (1134, 1146–47). He also increased the public character of the lordship in Montpellier and supported the growth of its trade.

== Power sharing ==
At the beginning of William's reign, secular authority in Montpellier was shared between the Guillem dynasty, the hereditary viguiers of the town, and the Bishop of Montpellier. In 1139 William confirmed the vicarage to the heirs of the old viguier Bernard Guillem, and the surviving document shows that the viguier's power has increased since 1103 and was probably at its height. William did secure the reaffirmation of his seigneurial rights at Castelnau (1132, 1138) and Lattes (1140). In 1139 William possessed several censives in the suburb of Villa Nova. A cens (plural censives) was a right to tax land, although earlier it had probably been a right to tax persons. By the twelfth-century it could be applied to the lands owing taxes.

In 1140 a dispute arose between William VI and the bishop over jurisdiction in Montpellieret. The bishop alleged that William was extending the walls and fortifications of the town to encompass some of the episcopal section of Montpellieret and was forcing vassals of the church of Montpellier to contribute to the local defence fund: "William had built a fortification [vallam] to wall his city in the tenancy of the bishop [and had made] the men of Montpellier, and other men of [the cathedral of] the Blessed Peter, [contribute to] the collection of the commune [communitas] of Montpellier." This may show that control of the walls and fortifications was already in the hands of the bourgeoisie, as it certainly was by 1196. It is probable that William was the first lord of Montpellier to oversee the extension of the walls to include territory judicially under the control of all three leading figures in the town.

William's feudal rights included the fealty and homage of several castellanies in the region around Montpellier. He procured general oaths of loyalty from the castellans of these in 1130 and again in 1147. He purchased the castle of Pouget in 1129, and bestowed it on his brother, William of Aumelas, and purchased that of Santeragues in 1147–48. Among the castles which William controlled (some more than others) were Montferrier, Pignan, Coronsec, Frontignan, Valmale and Saint-Pons-de-Mauchiens.

== Town administration ==
William inherited the services of two scribes who had worked for his father since at least 1103. One named William, who described himself as a "scribe of Lord William of Montpellier" (scriba domini Guillelmi Montispessulani), operated as late as 1139. Another, Girbertus, officially became scribe in 1113 and continued to serve down to 1125. William VI also hired his own scribe, Petrus Angelus, between the years 1128 and 1136. Early in William's reign documents start to sharply distinguish knights and other noblemen from burgesses in the witness lists, either by surnames or by title of occupation. In 1139 William instituted an administrative change: he began using a notary (notarius) named Durantus instead of a mere scribe (scriba). He served for the remainder of William's reign.

In 1146, William, in preparation for his journey into Spain, handed the government of the town over to his mother, stipulating that should she die it would pass to three burgesses, Olricus Adalguerius, Guillelmus Letericus and Atbrandus, to govern "with the counsel of the other witnesses of this testament." These three burgesses reappear as witnesses to William's last will, indicating their closeness to the ruling clan. In 1149 William purchased the jus naufragii (the right to salvage shipwrecks) from the Count of Melgueil for 3,000 sous melgoriens. The sou minted at Melgueil was the standard currency of the region, and William was vigilant to insist that the counts of Melgueil not debase it, to detriment of Montpellier's commerce. In 1128, in concluding a war with his son-in-law, Count Bernard IV of Melgueil, William extorted a promise that the coinage would not be debased. William himself controlled the mint, however, and in 1130 he had to agree not issue any coinage on his own authority, but only with the approval of the count. These agreements were confirmed in 1132, 1135 and 1145–46.

== Revolt of 1141–43 ==
In 1141–42 the viguier Aimon, at the head of the bourgeoisie, led a revolt against William and expelled him from the town. Alfonso Jordan, the Count of Toulouse, "attempted to fish in troubled waters", receiving a strong rebuke from Pope Anacletus II, with whom William VI had a close relationship bordering on an outright alliance. Despite papal support for William, the bishop refused to intervene against the viguier, but with Genoese and Aragonese backing he succeeded in taking back the town after a lengthy siege in 1143, to which Genoa contributed four galleys. The Chronique Romane highlights the role of Raymond Berengar IV of Barcelona and the siege-induced famine in the surrender of the town:

In the year one thousand, one hundred and forty-one, the men of Montpellier ejected lord William of Montpellier from the city, and the lord went to Lattes, and the battle endured two years. The count of Barcelona returned to him [William] the city through a siege. And at that time ten beans were worth one denarius. (En lan de M et C et XLI, giteron los homes de Montpellier en Guillem de Montpellier de la vila, et anet sen a Latas, e duret la batalla II ans: el coms de Barsalona rendet li la villa per assetge: et adones valian X favas 1 d.)

Immediately William set about to destroy the power of the viguier. He razed their castle within the town walls and revoked their judicial privileges and their separate court. With Aragonese assistance he initiated new construction on his family's castle in the north of the town. This phase of improvement was not ended until 1152. These moves, and probable the conciliation of the disaffected bourgeoisie, were successful in removing the hereditary viguiers, the Aimons, from a place of influence.

In the aftermath, the process by which the lords of Montpellier "took on a public character, become something more than mere feudal lords," was accelerated. A letter to his Genoese allies dated 1143 begins "William of Montpellier and his burgesses". The coinciding interests of the merchant class and their feudal lords, whose revenues increasingly depended on taxes on commerce, sped up the process by which the lords became representative of the town.

== Reconquista ==
In 1134 William VI was with King Alfonso VII of León and Castile when he besieged and took Zaragoza. There he paid homage to and became a vassal of Alfonso. The submission of García Ramírez, the king of Navarre, as well as "many other nobles from Gascony and France had become his vassals" was the justification for Alfonso's coronation as Emperor of Spain in 1135. Among the vassals from Languedoc only William of Montpellier is singled out by name in the Chronica Adefonsi imperatoris, the contemporary account of Alfonso's reign:

All of the nobles from Gascony and from the area up to the Rhone River, including William of Montpellier, came to Alfonso in a spirit of mutual accord. They received silver, gold, horses and many different precious gifts from him. They all became his vassals, and they were obedient to him in all things. . . He presented them with arms and other items. Hence the boundaries of the kingdom of Alfonso, ruler of León, extended from the shores of the Atlantic Ocean, near where the city of our holy patron Santiago is located, all the way to the Rhone River.

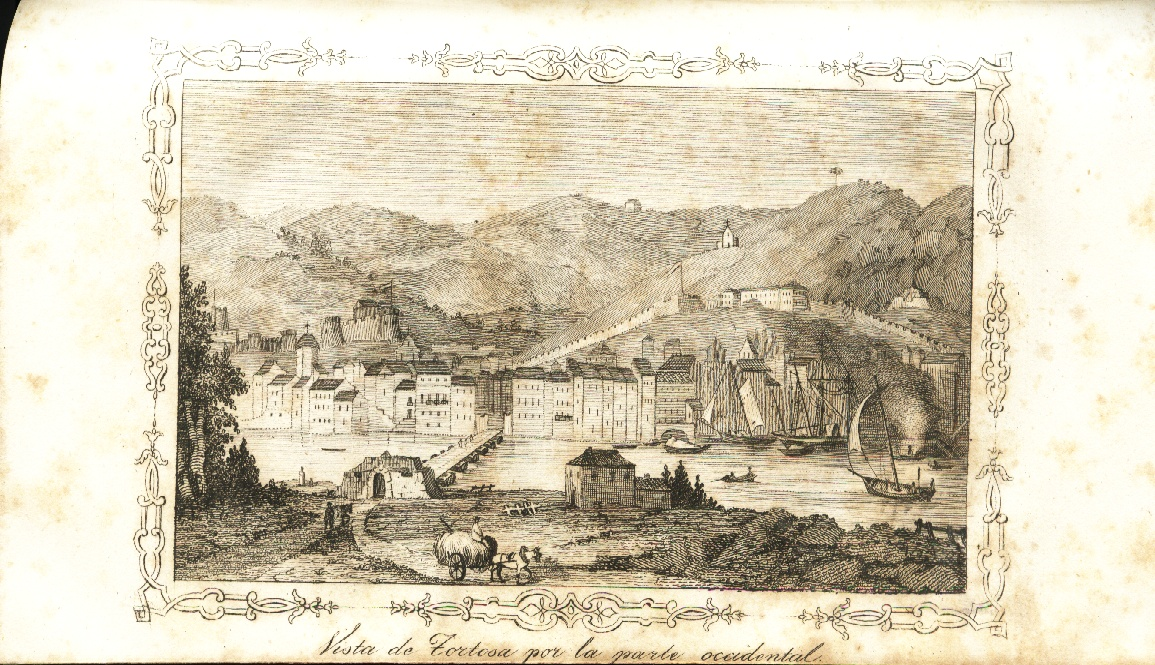
View of Tortosa showing the two main hills behind it

In 1146 Alfonso sent Arnaldo, the bishop of Astorga, as his envoy to the courts of Barcelona and Montpellier, requesting them to come in August 1147 for the siege of Almería "for the redemption of their souls". According to the Chronica, "they received his invitation with joy [and] promised to be present alongside of the Genoese [who were providing the fleet]." After participating in the capture of Almería, William also took part in another joint military venture: the reconquest of Tortosa. William and the count of Barcelona were among the soldiers awaiting the arrival of the Genoese fleet at the mouth of the Ebro on 12 July 1148. According to the Genoese account, the Ystoria captionis Almarie et Turtuose of Cafarus, the lords of Barcelona and Montpellier camped atop "Mount Magnara", one of two hills overlooking Tortosa, while the other foreign troops, mostly English, French and Flemish knights who had participated in the siege of Lisbon the year before, camped on the hill called "Romelinus". After the conquest of Tortosa, one of William's younger sons was made co-lord of the city.

== Marriage and alliance with Aragon ==
William VI's wife was named Sibylla, of Catalan origin. (According to documents adduced at the annulment of the marriage of Marie of Montpellier, her great-granddaughter, she was the daughter of Boniface del Vasto and therefore the sister of Manfred I of Saluzzo, but this cannot be confirmed.) The marriage was less an alliance between William and a minor aristocratic family from Catalonia than a tightening of ties with the House of Barcelona, soon to rule a complex of territories north and south of the Pyrenees. The support the count of Toulouse gave to the rebels of 1141–43 was part of the larger rivalry between Toulouse and Aragon (Barcelona) for power in Occitania, a conflict in which the lords of Montpellier gradually built up an alliance with the Aragonese, even though their overlords, the counts of Melgueil, with whom they were related, were Toulousain partisans.

William VI and Sibylla had five sons and all except Bernard William, who died before 1172, played a prominent role in Occitan politics. The eldest, William VII, succeeded his father; Raymond William became a monk and later a bishop; another William, who became co-lord of Tortosa after its conquest, married Ermessende of Castries, joined the Templars in 1157, vowed to go on crusade to the Holy Land for a year, and there died; and Gui Guerrejat later served regent for his nephews, the sons of William VII. William VI and Sibylla also had three daughters: Guillelme (or Guillemette), who married first Bernard IV of Melgueil and later Viscount Bernard Ato V; Alais (or Azalais), who married Eble III of Ventadorn; and Ermessende, who married Raymond Stephen of Servian. Guillemette's first marriage was part of an agreement (convenientia) of 1120 between her father and husband by which the former gained control of the Melgorian mint when Bernard mortgaged it to him for 7,000 sous.

== Notes ==
Titles of nobility
Preceded by William V	Lord of Montpellier; 1121–1149	Succeeded by William VII
