= Siege of Tortosa (1148) =

Military action of the Second Crusade (1147–49) in Spain

- Part of the Reconquista and Second Crusade
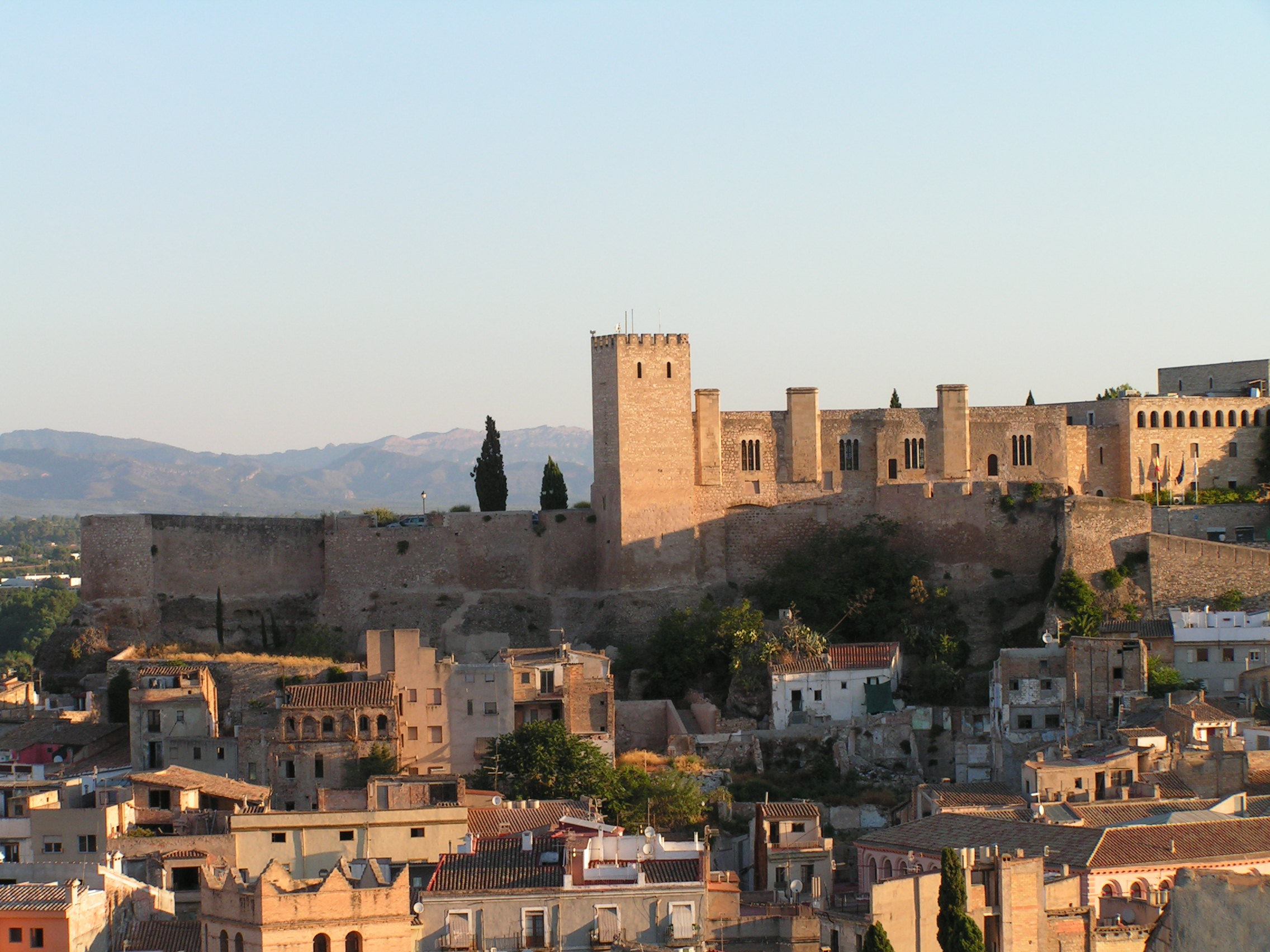
- The fortress complex of Muslim Tortosa, called La Zuda, besieged in 1148 by a crusader army.
Date	1 July – 30 December 1148
Location	Tortosa, Almoravid Emirate 40°48′N 0°30′E
Result	Christian victory

Belligerents
County of Barcelona; Republic of Genoa	Almoravid Emirate

Commanders and leaders
Raymond Berengar IV	Unknown

Strength
2,000	Unknown

Casualties and losses
Unknown	Unknown

The siege of Tortosa (1 July – 30 December 1148) was a military action of the Second Crusade (1147–49) in Spain. A multinational force under the command of Count Raymond Berengar IV of Barcelona besieged the city of Tortosa (Arabic Ṭurṭūsha), then a part of the Almoravid Emirate, for six months before the garrison surrendered.

The campaign originated in an agreement between Barcelona and the Italian city-state of Genoa in 1146, following a Genoese raid on Almoravid territory. At the same time, the Genoese also agreed to aid the Castilians in an expedition against Almoravid Almería. Papal approval, which connected the two Spanish endeavours to the call for a second crusade to the Holy Land, was obtained the next year. Participants in the siege of Tortosa were called "pilgrims" (peregrini), the same term used for those en route to the Holy Land.

The siege itself was a hard-fought battle. Siege engines were employed on both sides. Even after the outer walls were breached, the defenders fought in the streets to prevent the crusaders from advancing on the citadel. Eventually the citadel itself came under direct attack and the defenders asked for and received a truce of forty days before surrendering. There was no massacre and no looting, unlike during the conquest of Almería the previous year. The population, a mix of Muslims and Jews, was allowed to stay, while the city itself was quickly settled by Christians.

The conquest of Tortosa was a major event in the Reconquista of the Ebro Valley. Raymond Berengar IV followed it up with the conquest of Lleida on his own, without Genoese assistance or papal approval, in 1149.

== Sources ==
The most detailed source for the siege is the short History of the Capture of Almería and Tortosa by the Genoese statesman Caffaro di Rustico. Although Caffaro was not himself an eyewitness to either siege, his work is based on the accounts of eyewitnesses. He was also the initiator of the official history of the Genoa, the Genoese Annals, in which he makes note of the sieges and remarks that they had already been "written in the books and chronicles of the Genoese ... who were witnesses and participants in [the] events". He is probably referring to his own work, which was written shortly after the events. It makes no mention of Genoa selling its share of the city in 1153.

Besides Caffaro's work, the Genoese state archives contain valuable documents about events immediately preceding and succeeding the siege, such as the treaty with the count of Barcelona. These have been published in the first volume of the Codice diplomatico della Repubblica di Genova.

The Deeds of the Counts of Barcelona, an official house history, mentions the siege of Tortosa in passing. The capture of the city—and the Genoese involvement—is noted in several Catalan annals.

== Background ==
=== Prior attacks on Tortosa ===
Tortosa is 12 miles (19 km) up the river Ebro from the Mediterranean Sea. It lies on the eastern (left) bank of the river, flanked to the north and east by a ridge of hills. It was a seaport with extensive dockyards and an inner citadel called the suda (Spanish la zuda). A large urban area outside the suda was surrounded by a second (outer) wall. Tortosa's population was about 12,000 in 1148 and it had a reputation for culture in the Islamic world.

In 1081, Tortosa became the centre of a small independent kingdom, the taifa of Ṭurṭūsha, under a cadet branch of the Hūdid dynasty. Thereafter it was a constant target of Christian armies, either to induce the payment of tribute (parias) from its ruler or for outright conquest. The capture of Tarragona, seat of an archdiocese, in 1088 increased the value of holding Tortosa, since without it Tarragona could never be secure.

In 1092, Genoa and Pisa launched a joint attack on Tortosa. In 1095, it was attacked by Count Berengar Raymond II of Barcelona. Two years later in 1097, his nephew and successor, Raymond Berengar III, besieged it with the help of a Genoese fleet. This unsuccessful attack, coming after the launch of the First Crusade, had some of the trappings of a holy war.

Tortosa was captured by the Almoravids no earlier than 1114. It may have been captured soon after by Christian forces, but it was back in Almoravid hands by 1118. In 1116, Raymond Berengar III negotiated aid from Genoa and Pisa, and received explicit papal approval for an attack on Tortosa that never came to fruition. Another planned expedition of 1121 received the same benefits as a crusade from Pope Calixtus II, but failed to get off the ground. In 1128, the count of Barcelona negotiated naval assistance from Count Roger II of Sicily for an assault on Tortosa, but events in southern Italy overtook the plans. In 1129, the re-settlement of Tarragona began in earnest.

Barcelona was not the only power interested in conquering Tortosa. In 1086, it was besieged by King Peter I of Aragon. In 1134, his brother and successor, Alfonso the Battler, died at the Battle of Fraga, in the midst of a campaign directed towards Tortosa. In 1137, Aragon and Barcelona were united when Raymond Berengar IV was betrothed (Note: The marriage was not finalized until 1150.) to Alfonso's niece, Queen Petronilla of Aragon. The count of Barcelona could thus draw on Aragonese resources for the conquest of Tortosa.

=== Assembling an army ===
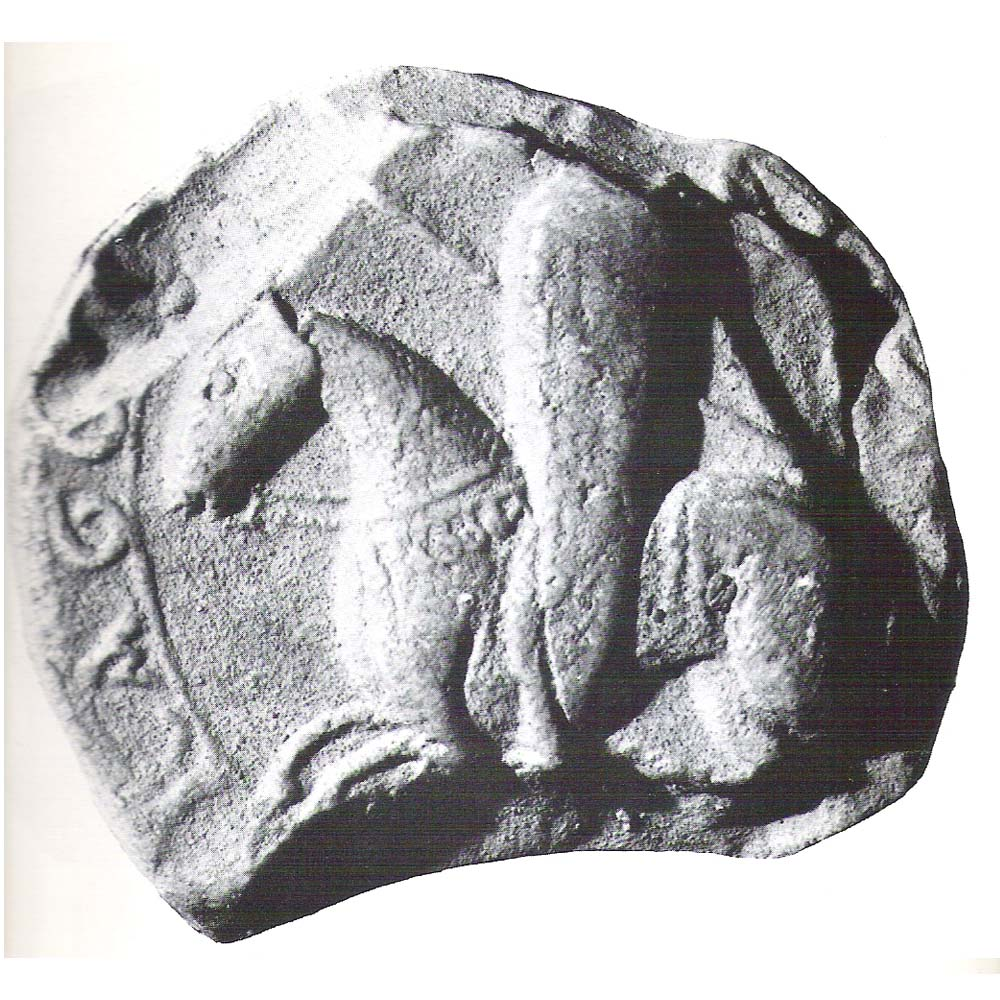
Partial seal of Raymond Berengar IV, depicting him as a knight with a kite-shaped shield

In 1146, a fleet from Genoa under the consul Caffaro di Rustico launched an attack on the Almoravid-held island of Menorca, then crossed over to the mainland to besiege the city of Almería, which was forced to pay a tribute. During these operations, an agreement was reached with King Alfonso VII of León whereby a Genoese fleet would assist Alfonso in the conquest of Almería the following May in return for a third of the city and exemption from all tariffs in Alfonso's domains. This treaty served as the template for a subsequent agreement with Raymond Berengar IV whereby the Genoese would assist him in taking Tortosa after the capture of Almería in return for a third of the city and an exemption from tariffs throughout Raymond Berengar's domains, which included Provence, of which he was regent for his nephew.

Besides the Provençals, other Occitan armies were recruited from southern France. William VI, lord of Montpellier, who also took part in the siege of Almería; Bernard of Anduze, husband of Ermengarde, viscountess of Narbonne; Roger Trencavel, count of Carcassonne and viscount of Béziers; and Peter of Gabarret, viscount of Béarn, all participated in the siege of Tortosa. William VI was accompanied by his son, the future William VII, to whom he had already promised his share of the city after its conquest.

On 5 October 1146, Pope Eugenius III issued the bull Divina dispensatione I encouraging Italian participation in the Second Crusade. A second bull, Divina dispensatione II, was issued on 13 April 1147. It specifically sanctioned the coming the Iberian expeditions as crusades, perhaps at the request of the Genoese. There were three such expeditions in planning at the time. Besides the expeditions against Tortosa and Almería, King Afonso I of Portugal had just conquered Santarém and was preparing to besiege Lisbon. On 22 June 1147, Eugenius issued another bull calling upon Christians to assist the count of Barcelona "in the expulsion of the infidels and the enemies of the cross of Christ" (ad expugnationem infidelium et inimicorum crucis Christi). He may also have sent Nicholas Breakspear (future Pope Adrian IV) as an unofficial legate to Spain. As an Englishman, Nicholas might have been instrumental in convincing Balluini de Carona, the leader of the Anglo-Norman contingents, about the worthiness of the enterprise.

Besides the army of Aragonese, Catalans and Occitans recruited from the three territories under Raymond Berengar's rule and the Genoese army recruited by him in 1146, the army that besieged Tortosa was joined by crusaders from northern Europe, namely Englishmen, Flemings and Normans. It is probable that some or all of the English, Flemish and Norman crusaders were veterans of the Lisbon campaign, although another portion of that Anglo-Flemish army had gone on to the Holy Land and was at that time participating in the siege of Damascus. The only source to explicitly link the English at Tortosa with those at Lisbon is the Royal Chronicle of Cologne, which says that afterwards they continued on to the Holy Land.

Among Raymond Berengar's Catalans were some knights of the military orders: Templars from the convent of Montblanc, some Hospitallers and some Knights of the Holy Sepulchre. These three orders were the beneficiaries of Alfonso the Battler's will, which had been ignored after his death in favour of the succession of Ramiro II, father of Raymond Berengar's wife, Petronilla.

By an agreement dated 25 May 1148, Count Ermengol VI of Urgell served in the count's army in return for a large share of the territory of Lleida when that place was conquered.

According to the Deeds of the Counts of Barcelona, Raymond Berengar's army was 200,000 strong, a more likely estimate is 2,000.

== Siege ==
=== Surrounding the city ===
The Genoese fleet that had assisted in the conquest of Almería, after leaving behind a garrison for its third of the city, travelled to Barcelona. From Barcelona, two galleys bearing two of the consuls returned to Genoa with money from the booty of Almería to pay off some of the city's debts. The rest of the fleet overwintered in Barcelona. In the spring, reinforcements arrived. During the spring, wood was cut from the forests around Barcelona to be used for siege machines.

The campaign may have been delayed by the ongoing dispute between Raymond Berengar and King García Ramírez of Navarre, (Note: The dispute stemmed from the setting aside of Alfonso the Battler's will. When Aragon went to Ramiro II, Navarre, which had been ruled by Aragon since 1076, went to García Ramírez.) who appears to have taken the opportunity to seize the Aragonese town of Tauste in March. The result was a series of meetings—at Soria with Alfonso VII and at Gallur with García Ramírez—that resulted in a settlement, the details of which are not known, but which assured that the Navarro-Aragonese border would remain calm during the remainder of the Tortosa campaign.

The Genoese and Catalan fleets sailed from Barcelona on 29 June and entered the Ebro on 1 July 1148. The Genoese fleet was under the command of the consuls Oberto Torre, Filippo di Platealonga, Balduino and Ansario Doria and Ingo and Ansaldo Piso. It stopped two miles short of the city, while the Genoese commanders and Raymond Berengar made an inspection of Tortosa's defences. It was decided to divide the army into three. Half of the Genoese army, augmented by some Catalan knights, encamped on the riverbank just outside the outer town walls to the south. The rest of the Genoese, the Catalans and Occitans under the personal command of Raymond Berengar and his seneschal, Guillem Ramon II de Montcada, camped above the city on the hill called Banyera to the northeast. The military orders and the crusader contingents from England, Normandy and Flanders camped beside a mill on the river just north of the town.

=== Assaulting the city ===
Some Genoese, impatient for battle, led the first assault, which resulted in heavy casualties on both sides. The Genoese then built two siege towers (castellae) and managed to breach the outer wall from the southeast. They continued to use the tower once inside to destroy houses and clear a path to the mosque, which was attained only after heavy fighting. The defenders had prepared a defence in depth.

The Catalan–Occitan force on Banyera had first to fill a ravine approximately 42 metres (138 ft) wide and 32 metres (105 ft) deep with wood and stones before they could assault the walls. This work was probably done mainly by the Genoese contingent. They then constructed a third tower capable of holding 300 men and a stone-throwing siege engine. This tower was probably financed by Raymond Berengar. (Note: In a document dated 15 October 1148, Raymond pledged the village of Viladecans to secure a loan of 50 pounds of silver from the cathedral of Barcelona. This charter was drawn up at the siege of Tortosa and the silver was probably needed to finance ongoing military operations: "Let it be known to all that I, Raymond, count of Barcelona, prince of Aragon and marquis, labouring for the honour of God and the holy increase of Christianity at the siege of Tortosa, out of greatest need and for the many expenses that I am making at the place to the detriment of Spain, accept from the treasury of the see of Barcelona ... fifty pounds of silver" (Omnibus sit notum quoniam ego Raimundus, comes Barchinonensis, princeps Aragonensis et marchio, pro honore Dei et sancte Christianitatis augmento in obsisione Dertose laborans pro maximis necessitatibus et multis expensis quas ibidem facio ad detrimentum Yspanie, accipio de tesauro Barchinonensis sedis ... quinquaginta libras argenti). The term "Spain" here means al-Andalus (Muslim Spain) and contrasts with Christianity (Christendom).) The outer wall having been breached, they brought it up to the walls of the citadel (suda) from the eastern side. The defenders countered with their own stone-throwers capable of hurling 200 pounds (91 kg) stones. One corner of the tower was seriously damaged by one such stone, but the Genoese engineers managed to repair it. The tower was then reinforced with intertwined ropes as an anti-artillery defence.

At this juncture, the pay of Raymond Berengar's men was in arrears and most eventually abandoned the siege. Only some twenty knights—and the Genoese contingent—remained with him. With the aid of some mangonels, they breached the suda's walls and the defenders asked for a forty-day armistice on 20 November. This was granted in exchange for one hundred hostages. During the following forty days they sent envoys to the other taifas, especially the taifa of Balansīya (Valencia), asking for relief, but with the recent arrival of the Almohads in Iberia, the taifas could not afford to weaken themselves to help Tortosa. Unfortunately for the garrison of Tortosa, the Muslim ruler to the immediate south, Ibn Mardanīsh, was tied by treaty to Raymond Berengar.

When the forty-day armistice elapsed, after six months of siege, the Tortosans surrendered on 30 December. As a later charter put it: "Tortosa, the key of the Christians, the glory of the people, an ornament of the whole world, was captured" (Capta est Dertosa, clavis Christianorum, gloria populorum, decor universae terrae).

During the siege, those Englishmen who fell in battle were buried in a special cemetery. After the surrender, the cemetery was handed over to the Canons of the Holy Sepulchre, so that in death the pilgrims could in a sense fulfill their vows to go to Jerusalem.

== Aftermath ==
Tortosa was taken with minimal bloodshed, probably because previous experience with Tarragona had shown how difficult repopulating a city with Catalans could be. In contrast to his description of the fall of Almería, Caffaro does not mention any booty- or slave-taking at the fall of Tortosa. The Muslim and Jewish population remained in the city. The Jews were granted a franchise and extensive rights by Raymond Berengar. By contrast, the Muslims were confined to a special quarter, the aljama, outside the walls. They were given one year to surrender their houses in the city proper. The aljama was partially self-governing, with its own leaders and sharia courts. In return for the right to freely practice their religion, the inhabitants of the aljama paid a tax to the count. At the time of the surrender, they had also to pay an indemnity.

The walled city was divided into thirds. The suda and the government of the city was given to the seneschal Guillem Ramon. The port and dockyards went to Genoa. The remainder went to Raymond Berengar, who granted a fifth of the revenues from the countryside and the outlying castles to the Templars, who were charged with maintaining a defensive perimeter. In 1150, the Genoese third was under the control of Balduino di Castro and Guglielmo Tornello, but in 1153 the city sold its share of Tortosa to Raymond Berengar for 16,000 maravedíes. The Anglo-Norman contingents in Tortosa were rewarded with lands and houses both inside and outside the city walls. A significant number of them stayed in the new frontier town which is shown in the large number of charters that survive in the monastic and the cathedral archives.

Following the capture of Tortosa, Raymond Berengar led a re-enforced army some 90 kilometres (56 mi) inland to besiege Lleida in the spring of 1149. On 24 October, Lleida capitulated. This campaign, undertaken on the count's initiative, was without Genoese or Anglo-Flemish assistance. It does not seem to have been regarded by contemporaries as a crusade, even though the strategic importance of Lleida was arguably greater than that of Tortosa.

== Bibliography ==
- Barrau Dihigo, L.; Massó i Torrents, J., eds. (2007). Gesta Comitum Barcinonensium: Textos llatí i català. Barcelona.
- Bisson, Thomas N., ed. (1984). Fiscal Accounts of Catalonia under the Early Count-Kings (1151–1213). Vol. 2 vols. University of California Press.
- Constable, Giles (1953a). "The Second Crusade as Seen by Contemporaries". Traditio. 9: 213–79. doi:10.1017/s0362152900003743. S2CID 151590776.
- Constable, Giles (1953b). "A Note on the Route of the Anglo-Flemish Crusaders of 1147". Speculum. 28 (3): 525–26. doi:10.2307/2847028. JSTOR 2847028. S2CID 162347364.
- Défourneaux, Marcelin (1949). Les Français en Espagne aux XI^{e} et XIII^{e} siècles. Paris.
- Epstein, Steven A. (1996). Genoa and the Genoese, 958–1528. University of North Carolina Press.
- Hall, Martin; Phillips, Jonathan (2013). Caffaro, Genoa and the Twelfth-Century Crusades. Ashgate.
- Jaspert, Nikolas (2001). "Capta est Dertosa clavis Christianorum: Tortosa and the Crusades". In Jonathan Phillips; Martin Hoch (eds.). The Second Crusade: Scope and Consequences. Manchester University Press. pp. 90–100.
- Odio, Arnold (2010). "Tortosa, Siege of". The Oxford Encyclopedia of Medieval Warfare and Military Technology. Vol. 1. Oxford University Press. pp. 362–63.
- Phillips, Jonathan (2007). The Second Crusade: Extending the Frontiers of Christendom. Yale University Press.
- Reilly, Bernard F. (1998). The Kingdom of León-Castilla under King Alfonso VII, 1126–1157. University of Pennsylvania Press.
- Riley-Smith, Jonathan (2005). The Crusades: A History (2nd ed.). Yale University Press. ISBN 9780300101287.
- Rogers, Randall (2002). Latin Siege Warfare in the Twelfth Century. Oxford University Press.
- Stalls, William Clay (1995). Possessing the Land: Aragon's Expansion Into Islam's Ebro Frontier under Alfonso the Battler, 1104–1134. Leiden: Brill.
- Viguera Molins, María Jesús (2000). "Ṭurṭūsha". In Bearman, P. J.; Bianquis, Th.; Bosworth, C. E.; van Donzel, E. & Heinrichs, W. P. (eds.). The Encyclopaedia of Islam, Second Edition. Volume X: T–U. Leiden: E. J. Brill. pp. 738–739. ISBN 978-90-04-11211-7.
- Villegas-Aristizábal, Lucas (2009). "Anglo-Norman Intervention in the Conquest and Settlement of Tortosa". Crusades. 8: 63–129. doi:10.1080/28327861.2009.12220130.
- Virgili i Colet, Antoni (2001). Ad detrimentum Yspanie: la conquesta de Ṭurṭūsha i la formació de la societat feudal (1148–1200). Universitat Autònoma de Barcelona.
- Virgili i Colet, Antoni (2009). "Angli cum multis aliis alienigenis: Crusade Settlers in Tortosa (Second Half of the Twelfth Century)". Journal of Medieval History. 35 (3): 297–312. doi:10.1016/j.jmedhist.2009.06.002. S2CID 159776759.
