= Bernard IV of Anduze =

Lord of Anduze

Bernard IV (died after 1162) was the lord of Anduze from 1128 and the husband of Ermengard, viscountess of Narbonne, from 1142 or 1143. He was possibly Ermengard's first cousin. He stood at the head of the family that ruled the north of the viscounty of Nîmes. They were vassals and allies of the Trencavels.

Bernard, a widower with children, was probably about forty years of age when he married Ermengard in late 1142 or early 1143. It was a marriage of convenience arranged by a Narbonnese faction and an alliance of the regional nobility acting against the dominance of Duke Alfonso Jordan and his faction in the city. On 21 October 1142, Ermengard had signed a marriage contract with Alfonso, who was the overlord of the viscounty of Narbonne and in control of the town during Ermengard's youth. The aristocratic faction opposed to Alfonso captured the duke and married Ermengard to one of their own, Bernard of Anduze. In exchange for his freedom, Alfonso recognised the marriage. An account of these events is recorded in the Jewish chronicle Sefer ha-Qabbalah, which says that the marriage took place at the suggestion of Count Raymond Berengar IV of Barcelona.

Bernard received oaths of fidelity from Ermengard's vassals and the leading men of Narbonne. The text of just one such oath has survived, that of Bernard of Porta Regia, but it refers to several others, now lost. By the marriage contract, he was excluded from the Narbonnese succession. He does not appear in Narbonnese affairs again, and it is probable that the marriage was arranged solely to render Ermengard ineligible for future marriage.

In 1148, alongside the count of Barcelona, Bernard took part in the Siege of Tortosa, part of the Second Crusade. His brother, Peter of Anduze became the archbishop of Narbonne in 1149. He witnessed the marriage of William VII of Montpellier and Matilda of Burgundy in 1157.
