= Gui Guerrejat =

12th-century French nobleman

- Died: 1178; Valmagne Abbey
- Spouse: Mathive
- Father: William VI of Montpellier

Gui Guerrejat ("the warrior") was the fifth son of William VI of Montpellier. When still a boy, in 1146, he inherited the castles of Paulhan and le Pouget from his father.

After the death of his brother William VII, around 1172, Gui served jointly with John of Montlaur, Bishop of Maguelonne, as guardian of his nephews, particularly of William VIII, who had inherited the lordship. In this capacity Gui and John attended the conference at Mezouls in 1174 at which Raymond V of Toulouse and Alfonso II of Aragon negotiated an agreement with the young William VIII. In October 1174 Gui was at Alfonso II's court at Lerida. In 1176 he was among those present when the will of Ermessende of Pelet, Countess of Melgueil, was read. In 1177 he joined Bernard Ato V of Nîmes and Agde, Countess Ermengarde of Narbonne, and his nephews William VIII and Gui Burgundion, in an alliance in opposition to Raymond V of Toulouse, who now ruled Melgueil as the widower of Ermessende of Pelet.

According to her Occitan vida (in the Biographies des Troubadours), the trobairitz Azalais de Porcairagues was the lover of Gui Guerrejat; her one surviving poem seems to be addressed to him.

In his will, made in February 1178, he made no mention of Azalais; he made a small bequest to his wife Mathive (otherwise unknown) and to her child if she should prove to be pregnant (she was not). Gui then took holy orders, perhaps aware of his impending death. He died later in the same year at the Cistercian monastery of Valmagne.

== Bibliography ==
- A. Sakari, 'Azalais de Porcairagues, le "Joglar" de Raimbaut d'Orange' in Neuphilologische Mitteilungen vol. 50 (1949) pp. 23–43, 56-87, 174-198.
- Biographies des troubadours ed. J. Boutière, A.-H. Schutz (Paris: Nizet, 1964) pp. 341–2.
