= Gallardet Dolmen =

Dolmen in Le Pouget, France

Coordinates: 43°35′12″N 3°30′36″E

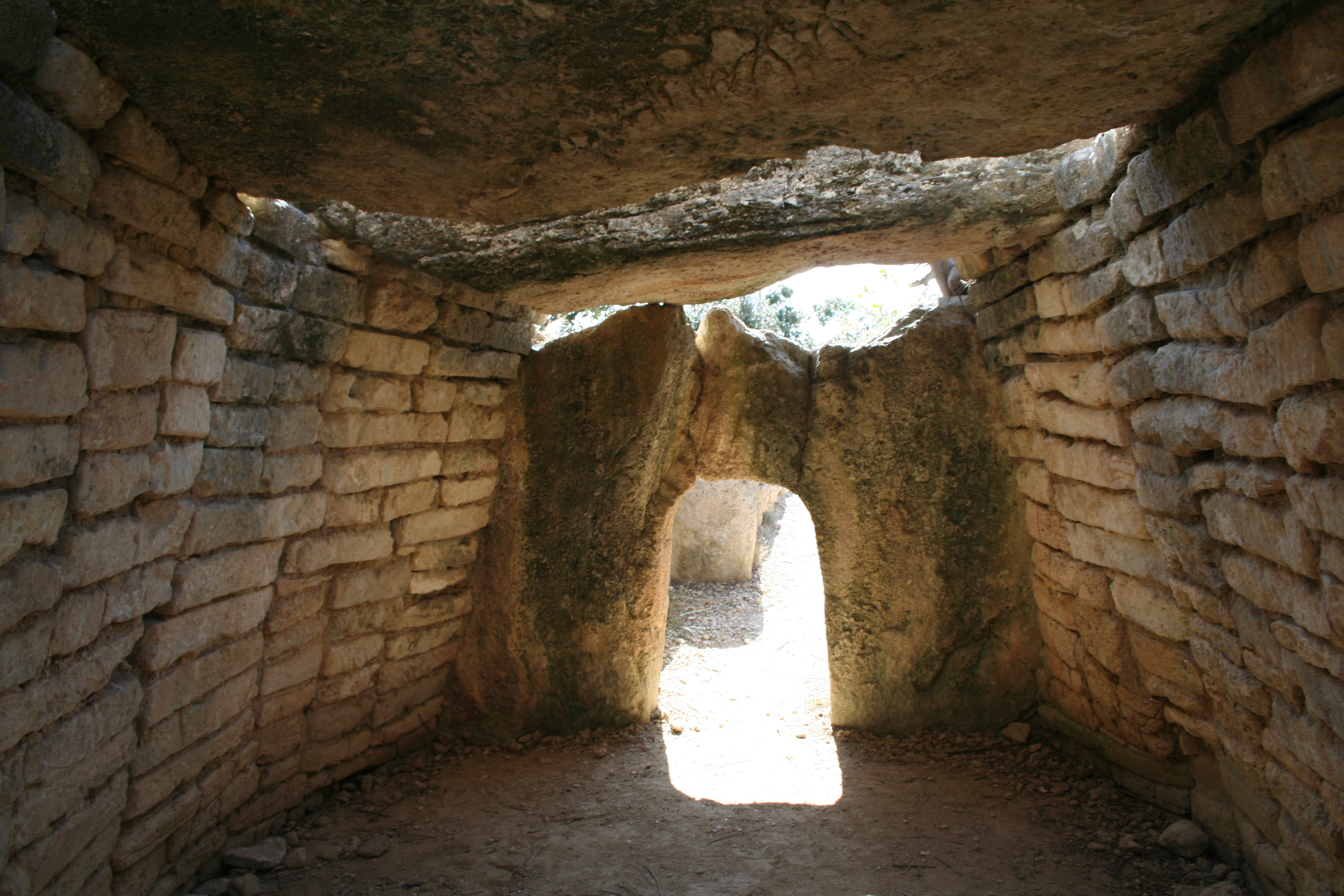

Gallardet Dolmen (French: Dolmen de Gallardet) is a dolmen near the village of Le Pouget in Languedoc, France. It is a large tumulus, containing a 12 metre long alley. The main chamber, 6 metres long by 4 metres wide, is covered by three large capstones. The entrance is described as being like an "oven door", 2 metres high and 1 metre wide. The access corridor is 5 metres long and between 1 and 1.5 metres wide. The corridor leads to an outside chamber which is 2.5 metres long and the same in width.
