= Al-Rushati =

Andalusī historian

Abū Muḥammad al-Rushātī (8 February 1074 – 17 October 1147) was an Andalusī historian who compiled a florilegium of previous historians entitled Kitāb iqtibās al-anwār, of which an autograph manuscript may have partially survived.

== Life ==
Born at Orihuela, al-Rushātī's full name was Abū Muḥammad ʿAbd Allāh ibn ʿAlī ibn ʿAbd Allāh ibn ʿAlī ibn Khalaf ibn Aḥmad ibn ʿUmar al-Lakhmī al-Marī al-Andalusī al-Rushātī. The last was a family name derived from the Ibero-Romance term for 'rose'. An ancestor of his had been nicknamed Rushaṭelo by a Romance-speaking servant after a mole.

When he was six years old, al-Rushātī's family moved to Almería, where he completed his education and began his teaching career. He learned ḥadīth (tradition) from Abū ʿAlī al-Ghassānī and Abū ʿAlī al-Ṣadafī. He also studied ʿilm al-rijāl (tradition criticism), Qurʾānic recitation, fiqh (jurisprudence), adab (etiquette) and ansāb (genealogy). He received an ijāza (licence to teach) from Abū Bakr ibn al-ʿArabī. He did not, however, go on a "voyage in search of knowledge" (riḥla fī ṭalab al-ʿilm). He saw Almería fall to the Almoravids in 1091 and he was martyred when it fell to Castile in 1147.

Among al-Rushātī's notable pupils include Ibn Bashkuwāl, Ibn Ḥubaysh, Ibn Khayr, Ibn Maḍāʾ and Ibn Qurqūl.

== Works ==
Al-Rushātī's main work is his Kitāb iqtibās al-anwār. It was praised by Ibn Kathīr. Originally in five parts, only parts one, three and five survive complete in manuscripts now in Tunisia. Some of the rest can be recovered from the abridged versions of Ibn al-Kharrāṭ al-Ishbīlī and Majd al-Dīn Ismāʿīl ibn Ibrāhīm al-Bilbīsī. Al-Rushātī relies heavily on the 10th-century historian Aḥmad al-Rāzī. He also cites a chronicle by "the sheikhs of Mérida" and "a book written by the Christians" that had never before been translated.

Al-Rushātī's other known works are Kitāb al-Iʿlām bi-mā fī Kitāb al-Mukhtalif wa ʾl-muʾtalif li ʾl-Dāraḳuṭnī min al-awhām and a response to the criticism of ʿAbd al-Ḥaqq ibn ʿAṭiyya.

== Editions ==
- Molina López, Emilio; Bosch Vilá, Jacinto (eds.). Al-Andalus en el Kitāb Iqtibās al-Anwār y en el Ijtiṣār Iqtibās al-Anwār. Fuentes Arábico-Hispanas, 7. Madrid: Consejo Superior de Investigaciones Científicas, 1990.
