= Battle of Guadalquivir (1138) =

1138 battle during the Reconquista

- Part of the Reconquista
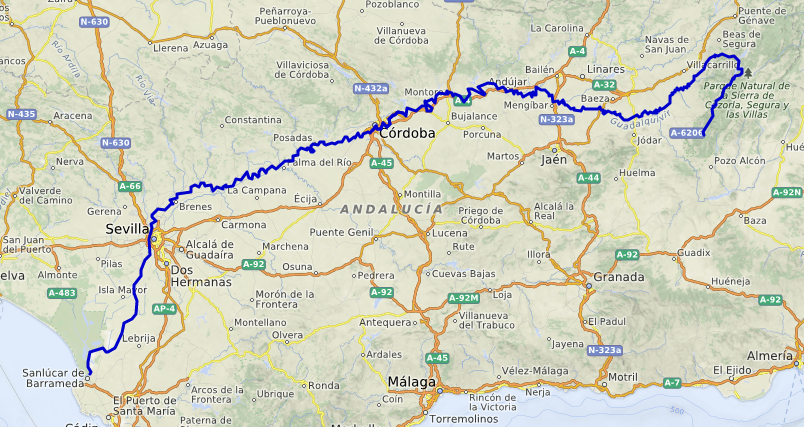
- Guadalquivir River where Alfonso VII raided nearby cities and towns
Date	1138
Location	A Guadalquivir River crossing
Result	Almoravid victory

Belligerents
Almoravids	Kingdom of León and Castile

Commanders and leaders
Unknown	Alfonso VII of León and Castile; Rodrigo Fernández

The Battle of Guadalquivir was a military engagement between Alfonso VII, King of León and Castile, and the Almoravids in the Guadalquivir River Valley in 1138. During a military campaign, Alfonso's army ravished numerous cities and towns only to have one of his raiding parties trapped and annihilated by the Almoravids at a flooded Guadalquivir River crossing.

== Background ==
The King of León and Castile, Alfonso VII, spent the first years of his reign establishing public order and restoring towns conquered by the Aragonese in a civil war. In 1131, Zafadola, the son of the last Banu Hud ruler of Zaragoza, was given territory in the Kingdom of Toledo in exchange for his pledged loyalty to the Alfonso and military service protecting the southern frontier from the Almoravids.

In 1133, Alfonso led his army across the Guadalquivir River and raided Cordoba, Carmona, and Seville in a campaign known as the Andalusian campaign. In that raid, Alfonso's army plundered the territory; looting; destroying the crops and orchards; and taking captives. Alfonso and his army then returned home passing through Talavera reaching Toledo in September of the same year.

== The campaign and final battle ==
In 1138, Alfonso returned to Andalusia to repeat his success. Accompanied by the governor of Toledo, Rodrigo Fernández, Alfonso camped along the Guadalbullón River near Jaén. Alfonso then sent out raiding parties to the towns in the Guadalquivir River Valley including Andújar, Baeza, and Ubeda. Alfonso's army destroyed villages and mosques; stole the livestock; burned down orchards; and took a large numbers of captives.

In the course of the campaign, one of Alfonso's raiding parties was trapped on the north bank of the Guadalquivir River by flood waters. Unable to cross the river and flee south to their basecamp at Jaén, the raiders were set upon by an Almoravid force composed of both cavalry and infantry.

The commanders of Alfonso's army were in no position to save them and could only suggest that they confess their sins. The doomed raiders could only accept their fate and did so. Before battling the Almoravids, the trapped raiders killed their captives. In the battle with the Almoravids, all the raiders were killed except one individual who managed to swim across the flooded river. The Almoravids cut off the heads of the raiders and retook the spoils. Alfonso's army could only watch from the opposite bank. Alfonso was greatly saddened by the news and the loss prompted him to return to Toledo.
