= Capture of Aceca =

Military engagement during the Reconquista

Battle of Aceca (1130)
- Part of the Reconquista
Date	Summer 1130
Location	Aceca, northeast of Toledo, Spain
Result	Almoravid victory

Belligerents
Almoravids	Kingdom of León and Castile

Commanders and leaders
Tashfin ibn Ali	Tello Fernandez (POW)

Strength
Unknown	300 men

Casualties and losses
Unknown	180 or 300 killed

The Capture of Aceca was a military engagement in 1130 between the Almoravids and the unified Christian Kingdom of León and Castile at the fortress of Aceca, northeast of Toledo. The Almoravids were victorious.

== Background ==
The fortified city of Toledo had been held by the Kingdom of León and Castile since its capture in 1085. Although the Almoravids had attempted to retake the city in 1090 and then again in 1099, all attempts were unsuccessful. In 1108, the Almoravids attempted to threaten and recapture Toledo only to fall short once again. After 1108, the Almoravids conducted regular raids of the territory around the Tagus River, attempting to capture towns and destroy fortifications to isolate Toledo.

In 1130, the Almoravids continued to harass Toledo under the command of Tashfin ibn Ali, the son of Ali ibn Yusuf, who governed al-Andalus from Granada. The Almoravids established two separate bases for operations against Toledo, Calatrava la Vieja to the south and Colmenar de Oreja to the northeast. Approximately 18 kilometers to the northeast, between Toledo and Oreja, the Christians maintained a fortification at Aceca which protected passage from the northeast.

== The battle ==
In the summer of 1130, during Ramadan, Tashfin left Granada with an army reinforced by forces from Cordoba and advanced to the north to harass Toledo once again. As opposed to attacking the massive walls of Toledo, the Almoravid force seemed intent on further isolating the city by attacking Aceca. Aceca not only protected passage to Toledo from the northeast, it also served as base for a "nest of raiders" that harassed Muslim held territory.

As a result, the Almoravid force bypassed Toledo, crossed the Tagus River and headed towards Aceca. Aceca was governed by a Castilian knight from Saldaña, Tello Fernandez. The Almoravid force had numerical superiority over the relatively small outpost and initially attacked the fortress from midnight until dawn. With the new day, Tashfin continued a sustained attack that lasted until sunset when the Almoravid force ultimately broke through and captured the fortress.

The Castilian garrison, estimated to be as large as 300 men, suffered heavy losses. Tello Fernandez survived the onslaught and was taken prisoner. The fortress was razed to the ground. The Almoravid strategy at this time was to not take possession of territory that they couldn't defend but rather to take resources away from their enemies.

== Aftermath ==
The impacts of the battle were substantial. Tello Fernández was taken as a prisoner to North Africa where he died in captivity. He was a very prominent military leader who launched frequent raids into Almoravid territory. The elimination of Tello and his horsemen ended the reign of one of the most effective frontier raiders of the early 12th Century.

In addition, the loss of Aceca further isolated Toledo by weakening its defensive ring and eliminating the unimpeded flow of communications, materials, and agricultural products to and from its northern and eastern territories.
