= Caffaro di Rustico da Caschifellone =

Genoa statesman, diplomat, admiral, and historian

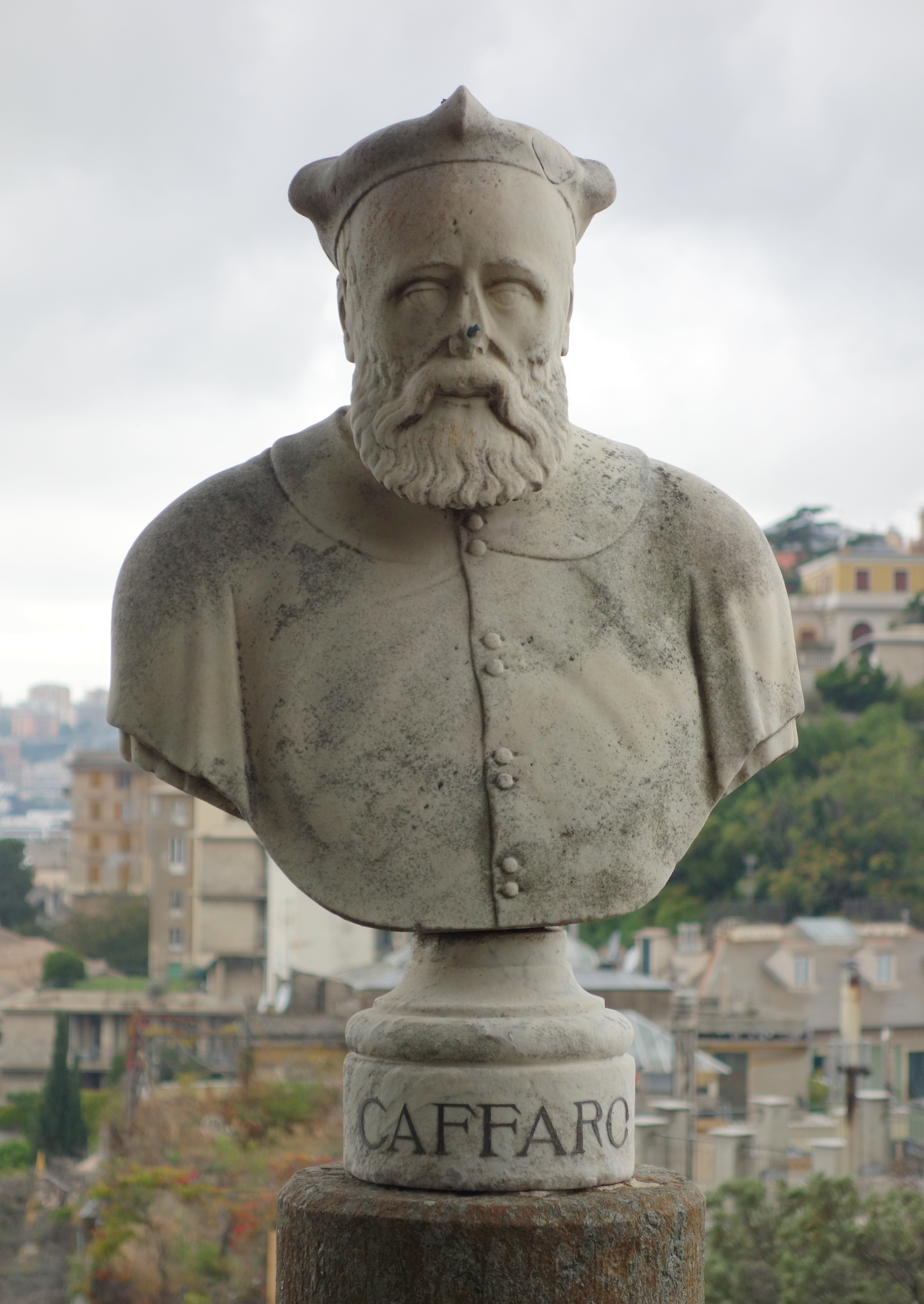
Caffaro di Rustico da Caschifellone

Caffaro di Rustico da Caschifellone (c. 1080 – c. 1164) was a statesman, diplomat, admiral and historian of the Republic of Genoa. Between 1122 and 1149 he served eight terms as a consul. His most enduring work was the Annales ianuenses ("Genoese annals"), the official history of the Genoese republic, which he began and which was continued by successors down to 1294. He also wrote Ystoria captionis Almarie et Turtuose, an account of the siege of Almería (1 August – 17 October 1147) and the siege of Tortosa (1 July – 30 December 1148).

Caffaro was born in the village of Caschifellone (now part of Serra Riccò) in either 1080 or 1081. While a teenager, he travelled to the Holy Land with a Genoese contingent on the First Crusade from August 1100 until January 1101. He returned to the Holy Land in the 1130s. Some time after that, perhaps in 1155–56, when Genoa was in the midst of a dispute with the Kingdom of Jerusalem, Caffaro wrote De liberatione civitatum orientis ("On the Liberation of the Cities of the East"), a work on the First Crusade, the relations between the West and the Byzantine Empire and travel distances between the cities of the East.

Shortly thereafter he began writing his history of Genoa, titled Annales. Though Caffaro's imperfect Latin prevented the Annales from achieving greatness as literature, the chronicle was the first of its kind in Genoa and remains an important historical record. It is an important source of information on the careers of the early Embriaco family.

On the strength of his fame as crusader, Caffaro became a captain in the Genoese navy, and fought in several battles against the Republic of Pisa and other Mediterranean powers. Toward the end of his life he became a diplomat, and carried out several diplomatic missions on behalf of Genoa to the courts of Pope Callixtus II, the Emperor Frederick I and King Alfonso VII of León and Castile, and also to Pisa.
