= Annales ianuenses =

Official history of the Kingdom of Genoa

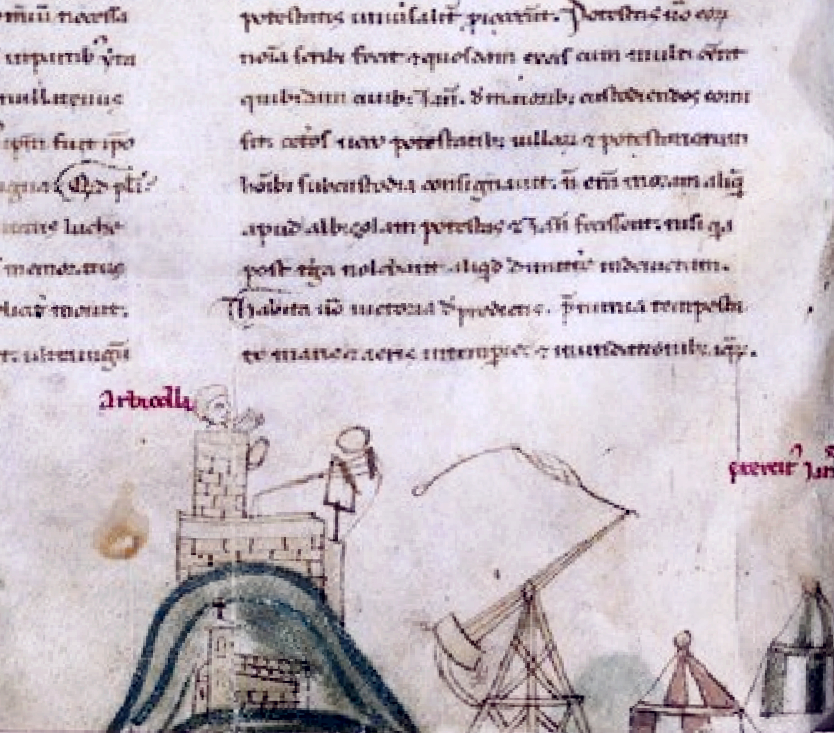
Illustration of the siege of Albissola Castle in 1227, from the Annales ianuenses.

The Annales ianuenses (Latin: "Genoese annals") or Annali Genovesi form the official history of the Republic of Genoa during the High Middle Ages. It is the earliest medieval civic chronicle and the earliest set of annals composed by a layman. The Annales form a chronological account of the history of Genoa from 1099 until 1294. The first annals were composed by Caffarus, a private citizen, on his own initiative. In 1152, he petitioned the republic to keep a copy in the public archives (comuni cartularium) and thenceforth the annals were continued at public expense. Caffarus, who probably began the work around 1100, continued it himself down to 1163. A series of officials of the chancery continued the Annales between 1169 and 1197, when work was taken over by the scribe and diplomat Ogerius. He worked down to 1216; thereafter, the annalists were anonymous, and at times a committee, until the last entry was added in 1294. The public manuscript of the Annales ianuenses is now kept in the Bibliothèque nationale de France, lat. 10136.

The content of the annals is confined to the names of the consuls, the changes to the constitution (the compagniae or sworn association), changes to the coinage and the victories of Genoa over her enemies, particularly Saracens and Pisans. In Caffarus' own words to the republic in 1152, the purpose of the chronicle was "that henceforth for all time the victories of the city of Genoa be known to future men."

== Editions ==
Modern critical edition by the Instituto Storico Italiano

- Belgrano, Luigi Tommaso, ed. (1890). Annali Genovesi di Caffaro e de'suoi continuatori, dal MXCIX al MCCXCIII. Fonti per la Storia d'Italia. Rome: Instituto Storico Italiano.
- Belgrano, Luigi Tommaso; Imperiale di Sant'Angelo, Cesare, eds. (1901). Annali Genovesi di Caffaro e de'suoi continuatori, dal MCLXXIV al MCCXXIV. Fonti per la Storia d'Italia. Rome: Instituto Storico Italiano.
- Imperiale di Sant'Angelo, Cesare, ed. (1923). Annali Genovesi di Caffaro e de'suoi continuatori, dal MCCXXV al MCCL. Fonti per la Storia d'Italia. Rome: Instituto Storico Italiano.
- Imperiale di Sant'Angelo, Cesare, ed. (1926). Annali Genovesi di Caffaro e de'suoi continuatori, dal MCCLI al MCCLXXIX. Fonti per la Storia d'Italia. Rome: Instituto Storico Italiano.
- Imperiale di Sant'Angelo, Cesare, ed. (1929). Annali Genovesi di Caffaro e de'suoi continuatori, dal MCCLXXX al MCCLXXXXIII. Fonti per la Storia d'Italia. Rome: Instituto Storico Italiano.

== Sources ==
- Bellomo, Elena (2013). "Annales Ianuenses". Encyclopedia of the Medieval Chronicle. Brill Online.
- McCormick, Michael (1991). "Annales Ianuenses". In Kazhdan, Alexander (ed.). The Oxford Dictionary of Byzantium. Oxford and New York: Oxford University Press. ISBN 0-19-504652-8.
- Wickham, Chris (1992). "The Sense of the Past in Italian Communal Narratives". In Magdalino, Paul (ed.). The Perception of the Past in Twelfth-Century Europe. Hambledon. pp. 173–190.
