= Ermengarde of Narbonne =

12th-century French noblewoman

Ermengarde
- Viscountess of Narbonne
- Born: 1127 or 1129
- Died: 14 October 1197; Perpignan
- Spouse: Bernard IV of Anduze
- Father: Aimery II of Narbonne
- Mother: Ermengarde

Ermengarde (Occitan: Ermengarda, Ainermada, or Ainemarda; 1127 or 1129 – 14 October 1197) was Viscountess of Narbonne from 1134 to 1192. She was the daughter of Aimery II of Narbonne and his first wife, also named Ermengarde.

== Youth ==
Aimery II was killed at the Battle of Fraga on July 17, 1134, fighting against the Almoravids along with Alfonso I of Aragon. Aimery left only two underaged daughters as his heirs, Ermengarde and her half-sister Ermessinde. Aimery had at least one son, also called Aimery, attested in numerous charters, but this son predeceased him (c. 1130). Thus, the approximately five-year-old Ermengarde inherited the viscounty of Narbonne upon her father's death, which occupied a strategic place in the politics of Languedoc. The land desired by the counts of Toulouse, the counts of Barcelona, the Trencavel viscounts of Carcassonne, and the lords of Montpellier.

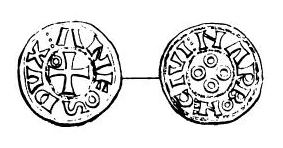
A denier minted by Alphonse at Narbonne during the minority of Ermengarde (1134–1143) bearing the obverse inscription DUX ANFOS and on the reverse CIVI NARBON

In 1142, Alfonso Jordan, Count of Toulouse, whose wife Faydid of Uzes had either recently died or been repudiated, attempted to marry the now-adolescent Ermengarde. In reaction to this prospect, which overturned the balance of power in the region by adding Narbonne to the direct control of Toulouse, a coalition of Occitan lords led by Roger II of Béziers, viscount of Carcassonne, Béziers, Albi and Razès, formed to oppose Toulouse, and arranged the marriage of Ermengarde with a vassal of Roger II, Bernard IV of Anduze. Alfonso was defeated by the coalition and taken prisoner, and was forced to make peace with Narbonne and restore Ermengarde and her new husband to the viscounty before being released.

== Narbonne's Geography and Economic Wealth ==
Narbonne is located on the southwest border of France in the Occitania region. The city itself is very close to the Mediterranean Sea and is located along the Aude River. Given the location of Narbonne, it became a perfect place to set up ports for trade and benefit economically. In the book Ermengard of Narbonne and the World of the Troubadours, by Fredric Cheyette, he goes into detail regarding how Ermengarde used the economic wealth of Narbonne to support her people. Due to the time this was happening, Ermengarde could not influence the cost of goods because that was just how the market was established. However, Ermengarde did take advantage of the transport costs, myriad tools, and taxes that Narbonne’s merchants were required to pay when traveling abroad. Cheyette says that Ermengarde did not exploit her city's economy; instead, she took control of the government and guaranteed that merchants were cared for and got what they needed for decades during her reign. For further context geographically, let it be known that just south of Narbonne were the Corbière’s Hills, which separated Narbonne from the city of Perpignan. Many other cities surrounded Narbonne, including Carcassonne, situated west of Narbonne, and along the Aude River as well, and north of Narbonne was Beziers. Toulouse, also known as the capital of Occitania, was constantly in conflict with Narbonne during the Middle Ages. Finally, there is a good separation of distance between Narbonne and Toulouse, which is further inland in France and northeast of Carcassonne.

== Political activity ==
Ermengarde was known for her political and legal expertise. She faced many challenges as a female ruler. For example, women during the Middle Ages struggled for respect, especially when it was unlikely for a woman to lead troops into battle. However, that did not stop Ermengarde whatsoever. She made alliances with powerful men like King Louis VII of France and supported King Henry’s war efforts in 1159. King Louis VII was an essential supporter for Ermengarde’s reign because he endorsed her when the people of Narbonne started questioning her as a ruler. This is very important because neighboring empires didn’t follow such traditions, so a King reinforcing her power was important. In 1177, Ermengarde joined Gui Guerrejat, Bernard Ato V of Nîmes and Agde, and Gui's nephews William VIII of Montpellier and Gui Burgundion, in an alliance in opposition to Raymond VI of Toulouse, whose power suddenly increased when he became ruler of Melgueil as the widower of Ermessende of Pelet. Ermengarde proved herself to be one of the most powerful female rulers throughout the Middle Ages.

== Cultural activity ==
Around 1190, a French cleric named André le Chapelain wrote a "Treatise on Courtly Love" (Latin De Arte honeste amandi). In the second part of the Treatise, "How to maintain love", the author spoke of twenty-one "judgements of love" which had been pronounced by the greatest ladies of the kingdom of France. Among them, three judgements were attributed to Eleanor of Aquitaine, seven to her daughter Marie, and five to Ermengarde. Although these "judgements" were probably fictional, they attest to the fame acquired by Ermengarde, even in the langue d'oïl in the north. She corresponded with many troubadours, including Peire Rogier, Giraut de Bornelh, Peire d'Alvergne, Pons d'Ortafa, and Salh d'Escola, as well as the trobairitz Azalais de Porcairagues. In addition it is believed that she welcomed to her court Rognvald II of Orkney, a Viking prince who became a saint and poet and who composed skaldic poetry for her. Ermengarde also had doctors and justice in her inner circle, making Narbonne known to be intellectually inclined in the 12th century. Many knew her to be very smart in diplomacy; she was able to negotiate during times of conflict and even solve other lords’ problems with others.

== Later years ==
Without issue, Ermengarde designated as her heir Pedro Manrique de Lara, the second but eldest surviving son of her half-sister Ermessinde (who had died in 1177) by her husband Count Manrique Pérez de Lara (who was killed in battle in Garcianarro on 9 July 1164). In 1192 Ermengarde abdicated the viscounty in favor of Pedro and retired to Perpignan, where she died five years later.

== Sources ==
- Cheyette, Fredric L. (2001). Ermengard of Narbonne and the World of the Troubadours. Cornell University Press. ISBN 978-0-8014-3952-0.
- Jacqueline Caille, Medieval Narbonne: A City at the Heart of the Troubadour World, Ashgate, Variorum Collected Studies Series, 2005.
- Cheyette, Fredric L. Ermengard of Narbonne and the World of the Troubadours. Ithaca: Cornell University Press, 2001.
- Cheyette, Fredric L. “Women, Poets, and Politics in Occitania.” In Aristocratic Women in Medieval France, edited by Theodore Evergates, 138. University of Pennsylvania Press, Inc, 2010.
- Ferrante, Joan. Epistolae: Medieval Women's Latin Letters. Columbia University Libraries, 2014. https://doi.org/10.7916/RK1E-8X32
