= Jean-Paul Nozière =

French author (born 1943)

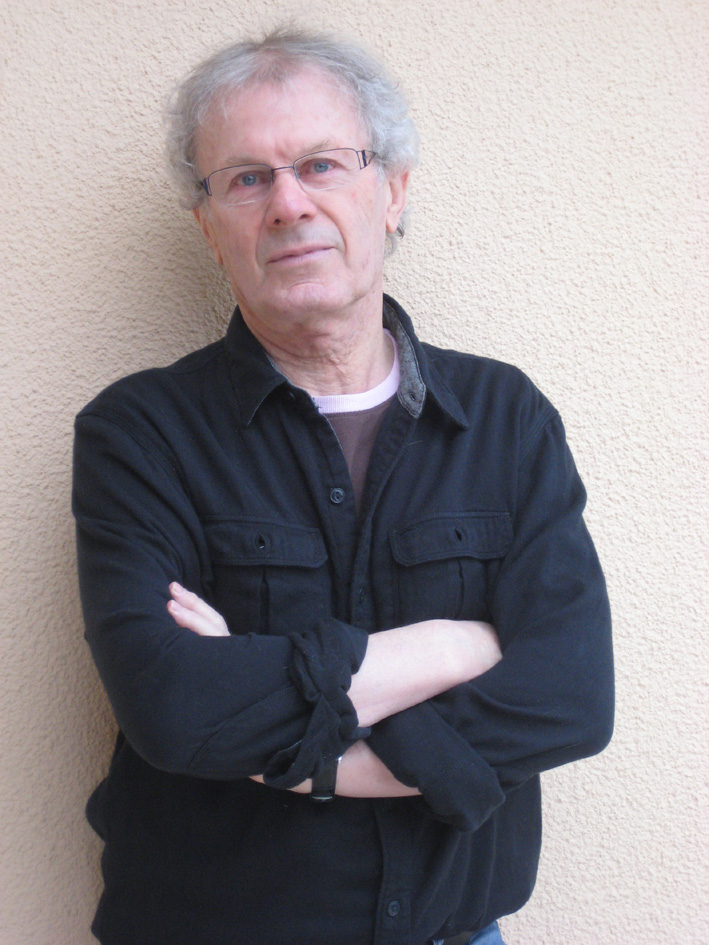
Jean-Paul Nozière

Jean-Paul Nozière (born 1943 in Monay) is a French author who lives in Bourgogne, France. He has written about thirty books for young adults, as well as eight mysteries for adults (in particular the series Enquêtes de Slimane of which two of four have received a prix du polar.

One of his books, Un été Algérien (An Algerian Summer), has received many awards in France. Algeria and its war for independence are of personal importance to him and are recurring themes throughout his works.

Some of his other works include, Dossier Top Secret (Top Secret Folder), Eldorado, Retour à Ithaque (Return to Ithaca), Tu vaux mieux que mon frère (You're worth more than my brother), and Fin août—début septembre (End of August—Beginning of September). He also wrote "La Chanson De Hannah.
