= Aceca, Toledo =

Coordinates: 39°57′02″N 3°52′10″W

Aceca
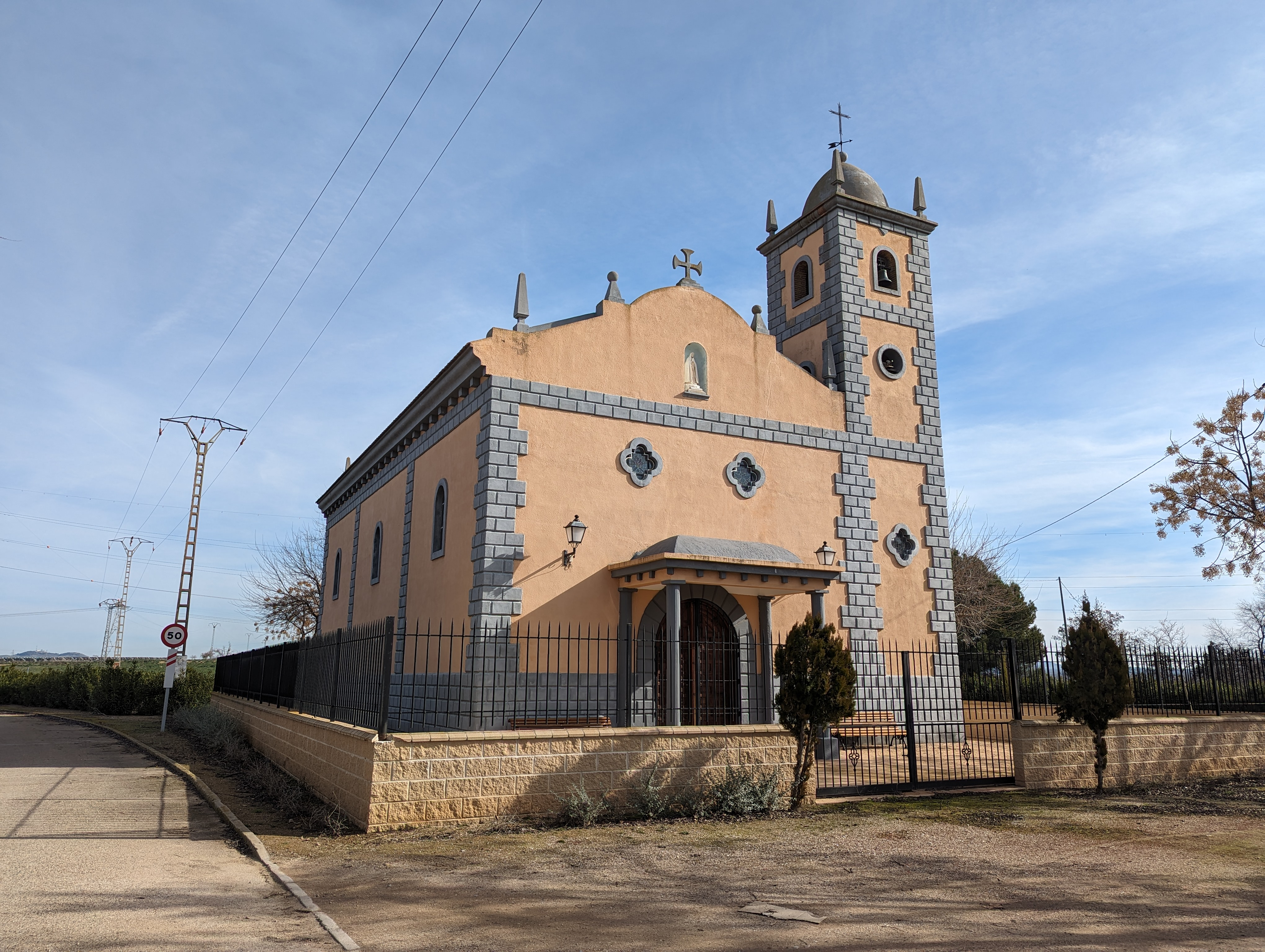

- Location within Spain Location within Castilla-La Mancha
- Country: Spain
- Autonomous community: Castile-La Mancha
- Province: Toledo
- Municipality: Villaseca de la Sagra

Population (2023)
  - Total: 10

Aceca is a population entity in the municipality of Villaseca de la Sagra, located in the province of Toledo, within the autonomous community of Castile-La Mancha, Spain.

== Toponymy ==
The name Aceca derives from the Arabic: السِّكَّة as-Sikka, meaning "the road".

== History ==
The locality is mentioned as as-Sikka in Mozarabic documents from Toledo, where it was referred to as a ford crossing the Tagus River.

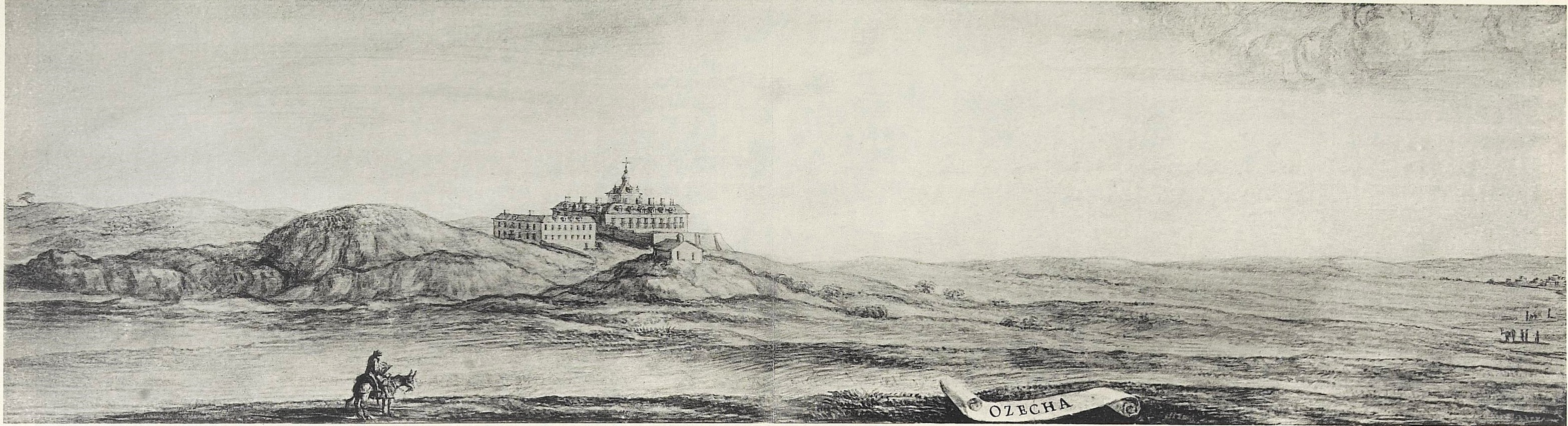
View of Aceca (spelled "Ozecha") in the 17th century by Pier Maria Baldi, from the Voyage of Cosimo de' Medici through Spain and Portugal

Aceca is later mentioned as an old village within the jurisdiction of Villaseca de la Sagra. It included a house, an oratory, and the remains of a former palace (see Casa Real de Aceca).

By the mid-19th century, it was already described as uninhabited (a "despoblado"). The Diccionario geográfico-estadístico-histórico de España y sus posesiones de Ultramar by Pascual Madoz provides the following description:

ACECA: uninhabited place in the province of Toledo (5 leagues), judicial district of Illescas (4), under the jurisdiction of Villaseca de la Sagra (1/4): includes what is called "the meadows, woods, and island", and belongs to the royal estate. Located southeast of Villaseca, it borders to the north with that town’s territory and the Veguillas de Alejarejos, to the east with the Gusdaten stream, to the south with the Tagus River, and to the west with Cuartillejo (now Velina or Sta. Coloma); it covers 3/4 league from north to south, 1/2 league east to west, with a circumference of 2 1/2 leagues, and encompasses 2,422 fanegas. The area known as "the meadows" is cultivated with cereals, the "island" and "woodland" are used for grazing, and there is an orchard of 8 to 10 fanegas for vegetables and fruit. On the right bank of the Tagus is an inn, and nearby there is a wooden bridge built in 1817, damaged by floods in 1831, and repaired the following year. The bridge is 110 varas long, 7 wide, with 12 arches, and level with the riverbanks. Previously, two ferries operated there until the bridge was constructed. Close to the bridge was a palace known as "Aceca", inhabited by the steward and the agricultural director of His Majesty's estate, along with a workers' house for laborers and artisans. All these structures deteriorated after the Peninsular War, their stones repurposed for building a weir used to operate two flour mills—one with four stones, the other with two—adjacent to the mentioned inn. Today, only one house and an oratory for toll keepers and estate guards remain.

Since the 1970s, Aceca has hosted the Aceca thermal power station. In the early 21st century, the residents of the original settlement were relocated to a housing development initially built for the power plant workers. As of 2023, Aceca had 10 registered inhabitants, 1 of whom lived in the main settlement and 9 in scattered dwellings.

== Bibliography ==
- Díaz Fernández, Antonio José (1990). "Aceca, de castillo a palacio" (PDF). Anales Toledanos. IV. 27: 81–96. ISSN 0538-1983.
- Madoz, Pascual (1845). "Diccionario geográfico-estadístico-histórico de España y sus posesiones de Ultramar". Diccionario geográfico-estadístico-histórico de España y sus posesiones de Ultramar. I. Madrid.
- Rubiera Mata, María Jesús (1986). "El vocablo árabe «sikka» en su acepción de vía y sus posibles arabismos en la toponimia hispánica: Aceca, Seca y Villa Seca". Sharq al-Andalus (3): 130.
