= Villaseca de la Sagra =

- Municipality
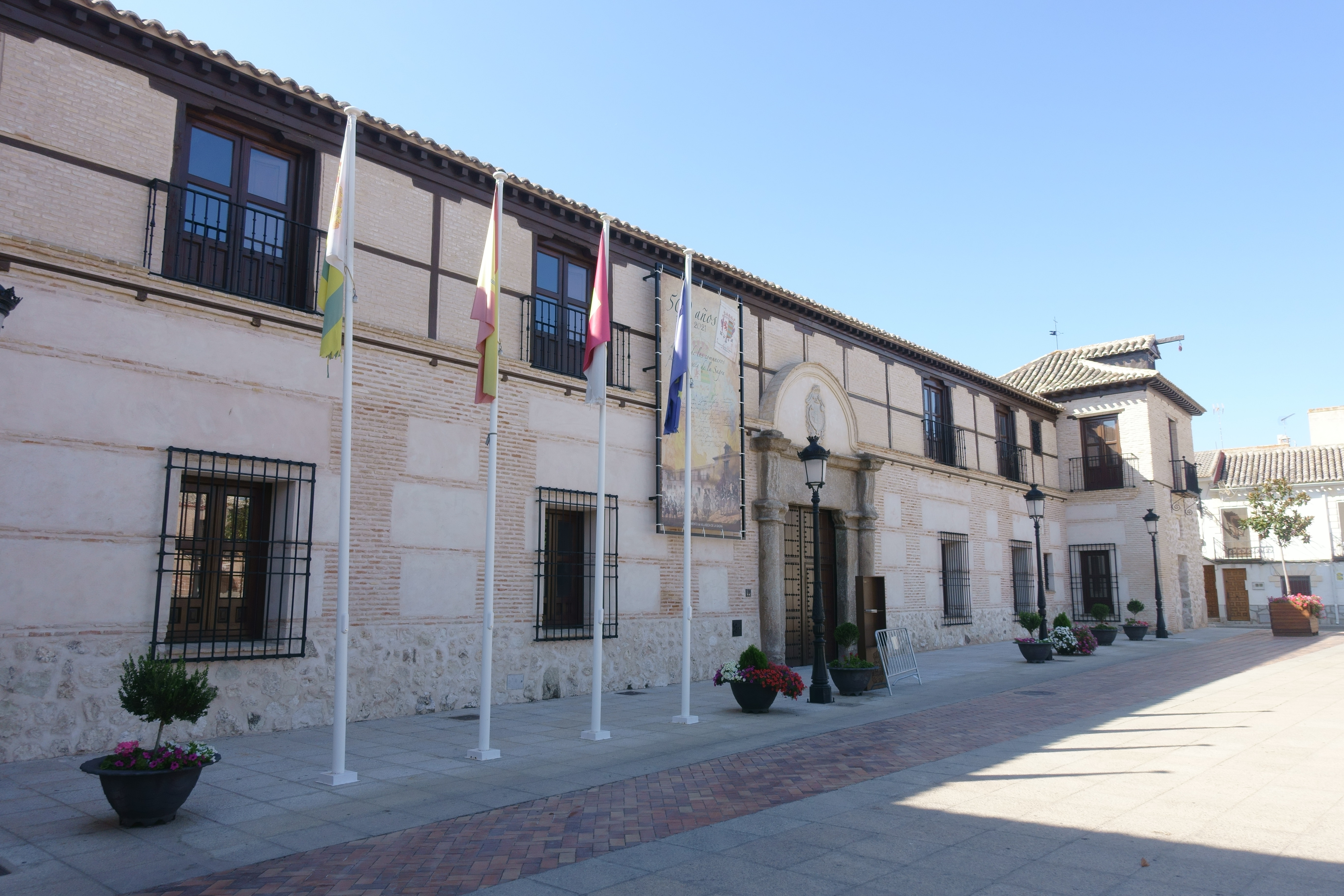
- Town hall

- Coat of arms

- Location in Spain
- Coordinates: 39°58′N 3°53′W
- Country: Spain
- Autonomous community: Castile-La Mancha
- Province: Toledo
- Municipality: Villaseca de la Sagra

Area
  - Total: 32 km^{2} (12 sq mi)
- Elevation: 475 m (1,558 ft)

Population (2025-01-01)
  - Total: 1,910
  - Density: 60/km^{2} (150/sq mi)
- Time zone: UTC+1 (CET)
  - Summer (DST): UTC+2 (CEST)

Villaseca de la Sagra is a municipality located in the province of Toledo, Castile-La Mancha, Spain. According to the 2006 census (INE), the municipality has a population of 1,581 inhabitants.

The village has a cultural centre with a library offering internet access and adult education classrooms. The sports centre offers a grass football pitch, outdoor and indoor swimming pools, a gymnasium and several sports courts. There is also a 35-bed retirement home.

== Geography ==
Located in the region of La Sagra, it borders the municipalities of Magán, Mocejón, Villaluenga de la Sagra, Alameda de la Sagra, Cobeja, Añover de Tajo and Aranjuez. The municipality covers an area of 31 square kilometres. It is connected to Toledo and Madrid by the AP-41 toll motorway and to the regional capital also by the CM-4001 Cuesta de la Reina-Toledo road.

The Aceca gas-fired power station and the high-speed railway workshops are located within the municipal limits.

The climate is temperate Mediterranean, with hot summers and cold winters. The average temperature in January is between 5 and 8 °C, and in July it is over 28 °C. The average annual rainfall in the last two decades of the 20th century was 370 mm.

== Demographics ==
Historical population
Year	Pop.	±%
1900	1,478	—
1910	1,605	+8.6%
1920	1,538	−4.2%
1930	1,691	+9.9%
1940	1,431	−15.4%
1950	1,655	+15.7%
1960	1,690	+2.1%
1970	1,645	−2.7%
1981	1,583	−3.8%
1991	1,569	−0.9%
2001	1,581	+0.8%
2011	1,866	+18.0%
2021	1,858	−0.4%
2023	1,851	−0.4%
Source: ISTAT
