= Le Pouget =

- Commune
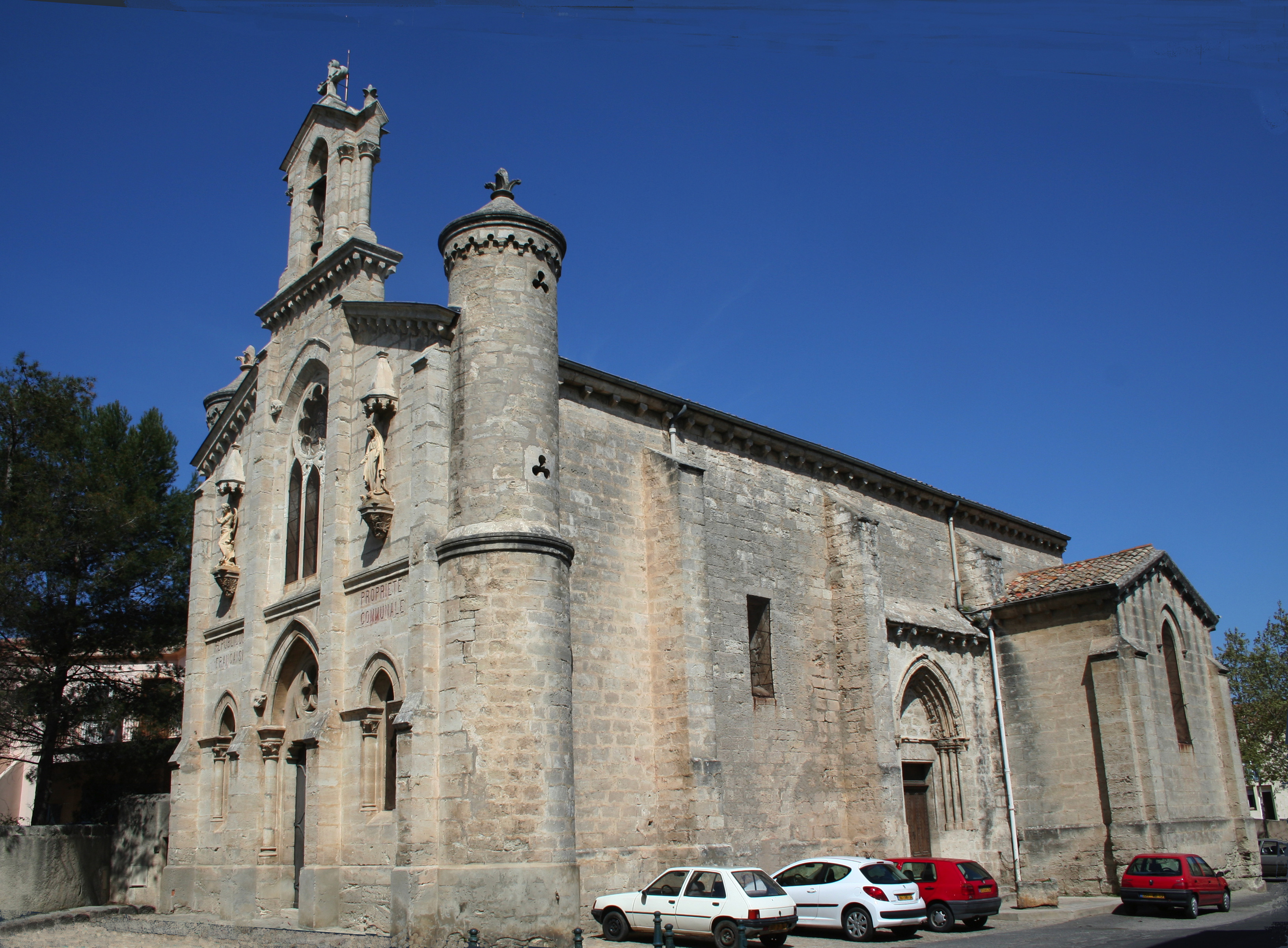
- The church of Sainte-Catherine

- Coat of arms
- Location of Le Pouget
- Location within France Location within Occitanie
- Coordinates: 43°35′36″N 3°31′32″E
- Country: France
- Region: Occitania
- Department: Hérault
- Arrondissement: Lodève
- Canton: Gignac
- Intercommunality: Vallée de l'Hérault

Government
  - Mayor (2020–2026): Thibaut Barral
- Area^{1}: 13.91 km^{2} (5.37 sq mi)
- Elevation: 95 m (312 ft)
- Highest elevation: 161 m (528 ft)
- Lowest elevation: 25 m (82 ft)
- Population (2023): 2,122
  - Density: 152.6/km^{2} (395.1/sq mi)
- Time zone: UTC+01:00 (CET)
  - Summer (DST): UTC+02:00 (CEST)
- INSEE/Postal code: 34210 /34230
- ^{1} French Land Register data, which excludes lakes, ponds, glaciers > 1 km^{2} (0.386 sq mi or 247 acres) and river estuaries.

Le Pouget (French pronunciation: [lə puʒɛ]; Occitan: Lo Poget) is a commune in the Hérault department in the Occitanie region in southern France. It contains the Gallardet dolmen.

== Geography ==
Le Pouget is situated on the sides of two valleys, Aumelas and Clermont L'Hérault. The centre of the commune is at the entrance to the medieval circulade. The clay soil favours viticulture. The river Hérault is 2 km from the centre.

=== Climate ===
Le Pouget has a mediterranean climate (Köppen climate classification Csa). The average annual temperature in Le Pouget is 14.6 °C (58.3 °F). The average annual rainfall is 680.8 mm (26.80 in) with October as the wettest month. The temperatures are highest on average in July, at around 23.6 °C (74.5 °F), and lowest in January, at around 6.9 °C (44.4 °F). The highest temperature ever recorded in Le Pouget was 45.2 °C (113.4 °F) on 28 February 2019; the coldest temperature ever recorded was −15.6 °C (3.9 °F) on 16 January 1985.

Climate data for Le Pouget (1981–2010 averages, extremes 1980−2019)
Month	Jan	Feb	Mar	Apr	May	Jun	Jul	Aug	Sep	Oct	Nov	Dec	Year
Record high °C (°F)	22.2 (72.0)	25.8 (78.4)	30.5 (86.9)	33.5 (92.3)	34.9 (94.8)	45.2 (113.4)	41.0 (105.8)	41.5 (106.7)	37.5 (99.5)	33.9 (93.0)	25.5 (77.9)	21.5 (70.7)	45.2 (113.4)
Mean daily maximum °C (°F)	11.2 (52.2)	12.4 (54.3)	16.0 (60.8)	18.5 (65.3)	22.5 (72.5)	27.2 (81.0)	30.5 (86.9)	29.9 (85.8)	25.6 (78.1)	20.2 (68.4)	14.5 (58.1)	11.4 (52.5)	20.0 (68.0)
Daily mean °C (°F)	6.9 (44.4)	7.5 (45.5)	10.5 (50.9)	13.0 (55.4)	16.7 (62.1)	20.7 (69.3)	23.6 (74.5)	23.2 (73.8)	19.4 (66.9)	15.4 (59.7)	10.2 (50.4)	7.3 (45.1)	14.6 (58.3)
Mean daily minimum °C (°F)	2.5 (36.5)	2.6 (36.7)	5.1 (41.2)	7.4 (45.3)	10.9 (51.6)	14.2 (57.6)	16.8 (62.2)	16.5 (61.7)	13.2 (55.8)	10.6 (51.1)	5.8 (42.4)	3.2 (37.8)	9.1 (48.4)
Record low °C (°F)	−15.6 (3.9)	−10.1 (13.8)	−10.1 (13.8)	−2.0 (28.4)	2.4 (36.3)	5.2 (41.4)	8.2 (46.8)	6.8 (44.2)	3.5 (38.3)	−2.1 (28.2)	−8.0 (17.6)	−9.1 (15.6)	−15.6 (3.9)
Average precipitation mm (inches)	61.2 (2.41)	52.3 (2.06)	38.5 (1.52)	53.5 (2.11)	53.2 (2.09)	37.0 (1.46)	24.3 (0.96)	36.9 (1.45)	69.4 (2.73)	101.7 (4.00)	75.8 (2.98)	77.0 (3.03)	680.8 (26.80)
Average precipitation days (≥ 1.0 mm)	5.8	5.0	4.8	5.8	5.9	4.0	2.2	3.6	4.3	6.6	6.1	5.8	59.9
Source: Meteociel

== History ==
The village was known for its circulade in the Middle Ages in the time of Louis XIV. The prehistoric dolmen Gallardet (or dolmen de Pouget) is a notable sight in the village.

== Population ==
Inhabitants are called Pougétois in French.

Historical population
Year	Pop.	±% p.a.
1968	1,077	—
1975	934	−2.01%
1982	987	+0.79%
1990	1,103	+1.40%
1999	1,347	+2.25%
2007	1,782	+3.56%
2012	1,823	+0.46%
2017	2,054	+2.41%
2023	2,122	+0.54%
Source: INSEE

== Sights ==
- Église Saint-Jacques, Romanesque church (now the Chapelle des pénitents blancs)
- Église Sainte-Catherine, Gothic church (now the parish church)
- Dolmen
- Saint-Amant fountain
- The circulade
- Château de l'Estang (private property).
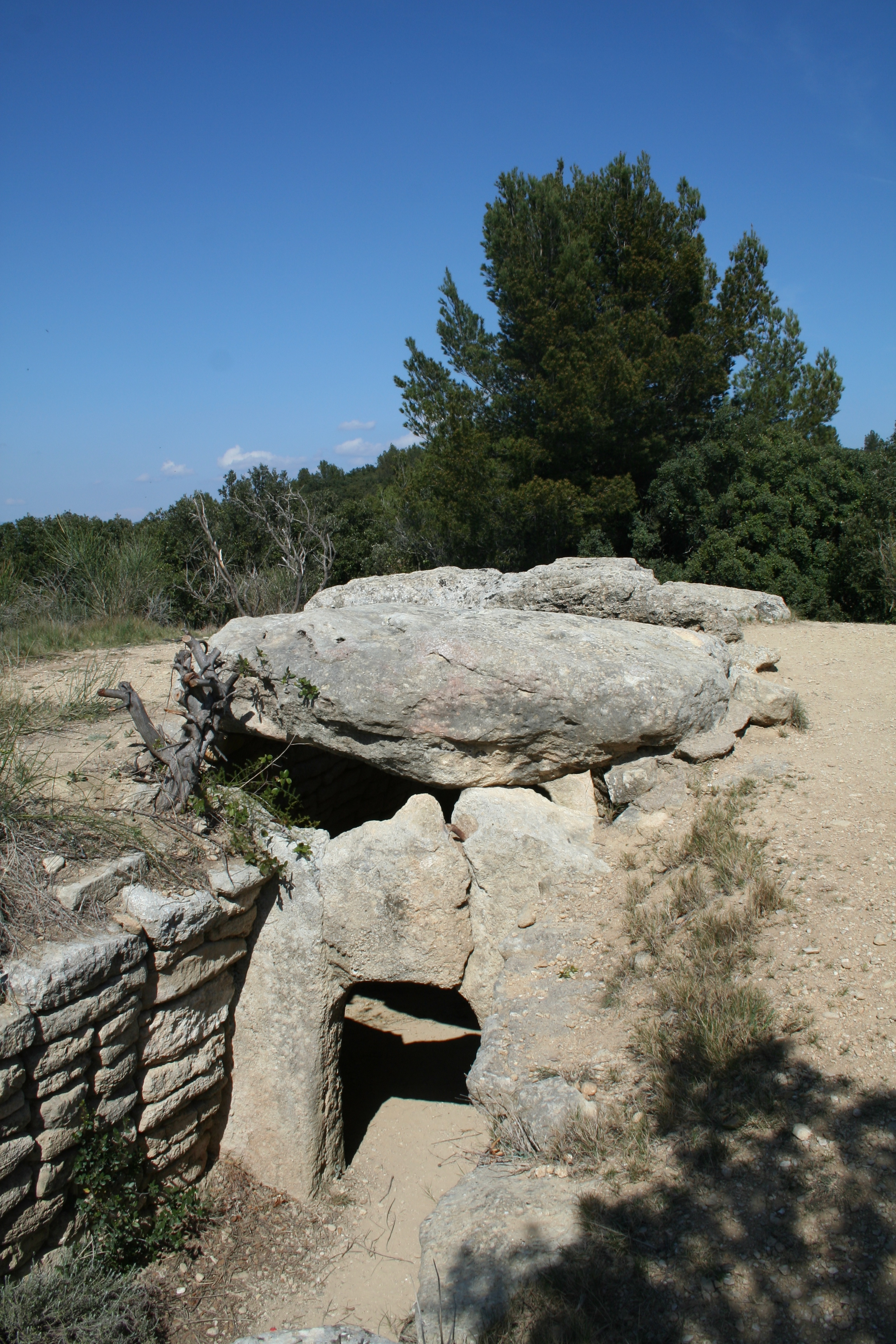
Entrance to dolmen

== Personalities ==
- d'Alzon family
- Jacqueline Mirande, French novelist
- Jean-Paul Nozière, French novelist

== See also ==
- Communes of the Hérault department
