= William VII, Lord of Montpellier =

French noble (c. 1131 – c. 1172)

William VII of Montpellier
- Born: c. 1131; Château de Gallargues, near Montpellier
- Died: c. 1172
- Noble family: Guilhem dynasty
- Spouse: Matilda of Burgundy
- Father: William VI of Montpellier
- Mother: Sibylle

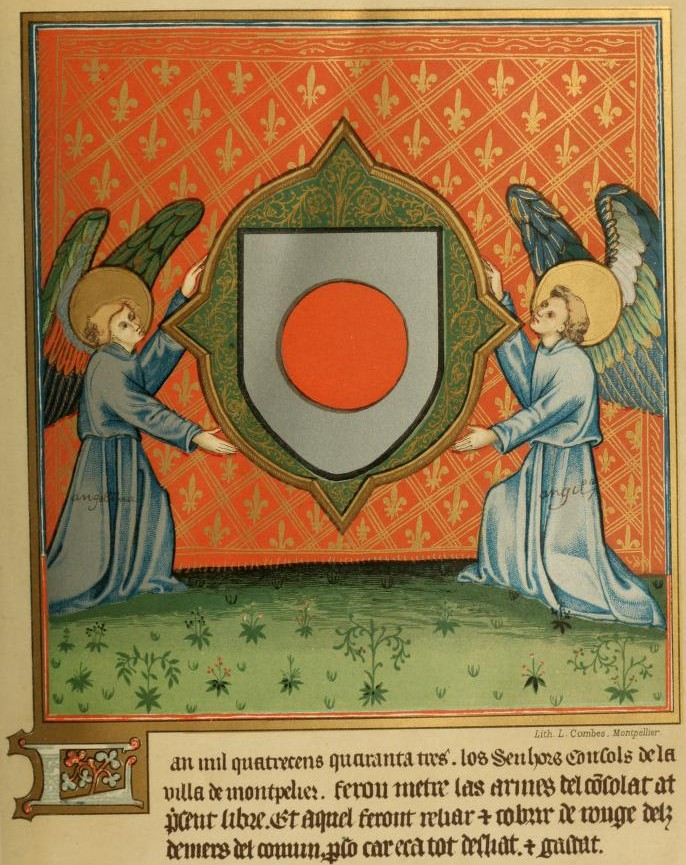

William VII of Montpellier (c. 1131 — c. 1172), the eldest son of William VI and of his wife Sibylle, was as 12th century Lord of Montpellier.

Aged around 15, he inherited the lordship of Montpellier from his father in 1146 under the tutelage of his grandmother, Ermessende of Melgueil. His father had retired to a monastery leaving him the lordship. The wealth of the estate was derived from Mediterranean trade at the port of Maguelone. Montpellier joined in a coalition aligned against the Count of Toulouse. In 1156 he married Matilda of Burgundy, daughter of Hugh II, Duke of Burgundy.

He fell ill in 1171 and made his will on St Michael's day (29 September 1171), appointing his brother Gui Guerrejat and John of Montlaur, bishop of Maguelonne, as joint guardians of his 4 young sons. He probably died in September 1172.

He and Matilda had nine children:

- Sibylle, who married Rayomond Gaucelm of Lunel
- William VIII of Montpellier
- another William, who died between 1171 and 1180
- Gui, named Gui Burgundion after his mother and to distinguish him from his uncle Gui Guerrejat. He married Azalais of Conas and had a daughter, Burgundione. He founded the order of the Holy Ghost
- Raymond, who became a Cistercian monk at Grandselve, then bishop of Lodève, then (by 1192) bishop of Agde
- Guillemette, who married Raymond of Anduze, son of Bernard V of Anduze
- Azalais or Adelaide
- Marie
- Clémence, who was for some time a nun, but in 1199 married Rostaing of Sabran, constable of the count of Toulouse

Titles of nobility
Preceded by William VI	Lord of Montpellier; 1146 – c. 1172	Succeeded by William VIII
