= Siege of Almería (1147) =

Component of the Reconquista

Coordinates: 36.833333°N 2.45°W

Siege of Almeria (1147)
- Part of the Reconquista
Date	1147
Location	Almeria, Almoravid Emirate
Result	Christian victory

Belligerents
Kingdom of Castile; County of Barcelona; Republic of Genoa	Almoravid Emirate

Commanders and leaders
Alfonso VII; Ramon Berenguer IV; Ansaldo Doria	Unknown

Strength
8,500 soldiers 63 galleys 163 vessels	Unknown

Casualties and losses
Unknown	30,000 killed or captured

The siege of Almería by the Kingdom of León and Castile and its allies lasted from July until October 1147. The siege was successful and the Almoravid garrison surrendered. The besieging force was under the overall command of King Alfonso VII. He was supported by forces from Navarre under their king, Catalonia under the count of Barcelona, and Genoa, which provided most of the naval force.

The city of Almería, known in Arabic as al-Mariyya, reached its zenith under the Almoravids in the latter half of the eleventh century and the first half of the twelfth. This period of commercial and cultural richness was cut short by the conquest of 1147. Large sections of the city were physically destroyed and most prominent residents emigrated to North Africa.

== Sources ==
There are two major Latin narrative sources of the campaign of Almería: Caffaro di Rustico's De captione Almerie et Tortuose from the Genoese perspective and the anonymous Chronica Adefonsi imperatoris from the Castilian perspective. There is also a Latin epic poem, the Prefatio de Almaria, which is incomplete in its surviving form and mostly just a list of the names of participants. Important information can also be gleaned from the numerous Castilian diplomas issued by Alfonso VII during the progress of his army and the siege.

== Preparations ==
Bernard Reilly estimates that Alfonso VII's army numbered about 5,000. The Prefatio and Alfonso's diplomas show fifteen magnates (noblemen of the highest rank) and nine prelates (archbishops and bishops) were part of the army. It is likely that each of these men was responsible for providing one squadron of heavy cavalry, which typically contained 40–60 horsemen, plus a squire and groom for each. To this must be added the infantry and the support personnel (drovers, carters, blacksmiths, cooks)—probably a further 3,500 men.

The Genoese contributed a fleet of 63 galleys and 163 other vessels under the command of the consuls Oberto Torre, Filippo di Platealonga, Balduino, Ansario Doria, Ingo Piso and Ansaldo Piso. For its help, Alfonso VII promised the city a third of all conquests, the right to commerce and exemption from tolls.

== Siege ==
In the spring of 1147, an advance force of fifteen galleys under the consul Balduino arrived off Cabo de Gata expecting to rendezvous with Alfonso. Not finding Alfonso, Balduino waited with his fleet outside the harbour of Almería for a month before Count Ramon Berenguer IV of Barcelona arrived with one ship and fifty-three knights. Ansaldo Doria arrived at the same time with sixteen galleys.

The Genoese–Catalan force decided to make an initial assault before the arrival of the main army. Ramon Berenguer and his men went ashore while Balduino feigned a seaborne assault on the mosque. Ansaldo took one galley up the river Andarax to scout and to provide an advance warning of any relieving force. The rest of the fleet waited outside the river mouth.

Expecting a surprise attack from the land, Almería sent out two scouts, but they failed to locate the count of Barcelona's troops. Balduino's initial assault met stiff resistance from a force of 1,040 men, according to Caffaro. The Genoese lost eight in the fighting. After the first clash, the fleet that had been waiting in the river mouth joined Balduino at the docks. According to Caffaro, the defenders lost 5,000 men in the ensuing battle and were forced to retreat. The ships were then beached to allow the unloading of the siege equipment—rams, towers and catapults.

By the time Alfonso arrived with a force of 400 knights and 1,000 infantry, the Genoese had assembled their siege engines. They were strategically placed and, despite constant counterattacks by the defenders, managed to destroy 52 feet (16 m) of wall.

In the fall, Alfonso VII opened negotiations with the defenders. He sent King García Ramírez of Navarre and Count Ermengol VI of Urgell as his representatives. The city offered to pay 100,000 maravedíes and give hostages if Alfonso would abandon the siege (and his Genoese allies, who were not privy to the negotiations).

The final attack on the city was spearheaded by the Genoese contingent, having received word that Alfonso VII was prepared to make peace. On 17 October, without a battle cry, twelve thousand Genoese attacked the city. The Catalans refused to join the attack, but Alfonso eventually sent his men into the battle. After three hours, the city was captured save for the citadel. According to Caffaro, 20,000 Muslims were killed and 10,000 women and children captured. Four days later (21 October), the citadel surrendered. The garrison paid 30 million maravedíes to spare their lives.

== Aftermath ==
The scholar al-Rushati was among those killed in the siege.

The Genoese left behind a garrison of 1,000 men.

Almería was re-captured by the Almohads in 1157.

== Bibliography ==
- Barton, Simon F. (1997). The Aristocracy in Twelfth-Century León and Castile. Cambridge University Press.
- Bosch Vilá, Jacinto (1991). "al-Mariyya". The Encyclopaedia of Islam. Vol. 6, Mahk–Mid (new ed.). Leiden: Brill. pp. 575–77.
- Constable, Giles (1953a). "The Second Crusade as Seen by Contemporaries". Traditio. 9: 213–79. doi:10.1017/s0362152900003743.
- Epstein, Steven A. (1996). Genoa and the Genoese, 958–1528. University of North Carolina Press.
- Fierro, Maribel (1995). "al-Rushātī". In Bosworth, C. E.; van Donzel, E.; Heinrichs, W. P. & Lecomte, G. (eds.). The Encyclopaedia of Islam, Second Edition. Volume VIII: Ned–Sam. Leiden: E. J. Brill. pp. 635–636. ISBN 978-90-04-09834-3.
- Hall, Martin; Phillips, Jonathan (2013). Caffaro, Genoa and the Twelfth-Century Crusades. Ashgate.
- Odio, Arnold (2010). "Almería, Siege of". The Oxford Encyclopedia of Medieval Warfare and Military Technology. Vol. 1. Oxford University Press. pp. 362–63.
- Phillips, Jonathan (2007). The Second Crusade: Extending the Frontiers of Christendom. Yale University Press.
- Reilly, Bernard F. (1998). The Kingdom of León-Castilla under King Alfonso VII, 1126–1157. University of Pennsylvania Press.
- Rogers, Randall (2002). Latin Siege Warfare in the Twelfth Century. Oxford University Press.
- Williams, John Bryan (1997). "The Making of a Crusade: The Genoese Anti-Muslim Attacks in Spain, 1146–1148". Journal of Medieval History. 23 (1): 29–53. doi:10.1016/s0304-4181(96)00022-x.
